= 2014 in Syria =

- Decades: 1990s; 2000s; 2010s; 2020s
- See also: History of Syria; Timeline of Syrian history; List of years in Syria

The following lists events that happened in 2014 in Syria.

== Incumbents ==
Office	Image	Name	Assumed office / Current length
President of the Syrian Arab Republic		Bashar al-Assad	17 July 2000 (26 years ago)
Vice President of the Syrian Arab Republic		Farouk al-Shara	21 February 2006 – 19 July 2014
Vice President of the Syrian Arab Republic		Najah al-Attar	23 March 2006 (20 years ago)
Speaker of the People's Assembly		Mohammad Jihad al-Laham	24 May 2012 (14 years ago)
President of the Supreme Constitutional Court		Adnan Zureiq	2 September 2012 (13 years ago)
Prime Minister of the Syrian Arab Republic		Wael Nader al-Halqi	9 August 2012 (13 years ago)

== Events ==
For events related to the Civil War, see Timeline of the Syrian Civil War (January–July 2014) and Timeline of the Syrian Civil War (August–December 2014)

=== June ===
- June 3 - The presidential election takes place in government-controlled areas, amidst an opposition boycott. While the West denounces the election as rigged and "meaningless", delegations from President Bashar Assad's main supporters, including Russia, Iran and Venezuela, praise the election as transparent and free.
- June 4 - The Syrian government announces Assad was re-elected, claiming that Assad had won with 88.7% of the vote and a turnout of 73.47% of eligible voters.
- June 23 - The final stockpile of "declared" chemical weapons is shipped out of the country.

=== July ===
- July 16 - Assad is sworn in to serve his third seven-year term as President.
