= 2015 in Syria =

- Decades: 1990s; 2000s; 2010s; 2020s
- See also: History of Syria; Timeline of Syrian history; List of years in Syria

The following lists events that happened in 2015 in Syria.

== Incumbents ==
Office	Image	Name	Assumed office / Current length
President of the Syrian Arab Republic		Bashar al-Assad	17 July 2000 (26 years ago)
Vice President of the Syrian Arab Republic		Najah al-Attar	23 March 2006 (20 years ago)
Speaker of the People's Assembly		Mohammad Jihad al-Laham	24 May 2012 (14 years ago)
President of the Supreme Constitutional Court		Adnan Zureiq	2 September 2012 (13 years ago)
Prime Minister of the Syrian Arab Republic		Wael Nader al-Halqi	9 August 2012 (13 years ago)

== Events ==
For events related to the Civil War, see Timeline of the Syrian Civil War (January–July 2015) and Timeline of the Syrian Civil War (August–December 2015)

== Deaths ==
Estimates of the total number of deaths in the Syrian Civil War, by opposition activist groups, vary between 494,438 and about 606,000 as of June 2021. On 23 April 2016, the United Nations and Arab League Envoy to Syria put out an estimate of 400,000 that had died in the war.
