= 2012 in Syria =

- Decades: 1990s; 2000s; 2010s; 2020s
- See also: History of Syria; Timeline of Syrian history; List of years in Syria

Events from the year 2012 in Syria.

== Incumbents ==
Office	Image	Name	Assumed office / Current length
President of the Syrian Arab Republic		Bashar al-Assad	17 July 2000 (26 years ago)
Vice President of the Syrian Arab Republic		Farouk al-Shara	21 February 2006 (20 years ago)
Vice President of the Syrian Arab Republic		Najah al-Attar	23 March 2006 (20 years ago)
Speaker of the People's Assembly		Mohammad Jihad al-Laham	24 May 2012 (14 years ago)
President of the Supreme Constitutional Court		Adnan Zureiq	22 May 2012 (14 years ago)
Prime Minister of the Syrian Arab Republic		Adel Safar	14 April 2011 – 23 June 2012
Prime Minister of the Syrian Arab Republic		Riyad Farid Hijab	23 June – 6 August 2012
Prime Minister of the Syrian Arab Republic		Omar Ibrahim Ghalawanji	Acting: 6–9 August 2012
Prime Minister of the Syrian Arab Republic		Wael Nader al-Halqi	9 August 2012 (14 years ago)

== Events ==
For events related to the Civil War, see Timeline of the Syrian Civil War (January–April 2012), Timeline of the Syrian Civil War (May–August 2012) and Timeline of the Syrian Civil War (September–December 2012)

The 2012 Syrian protests and demonstrations were protests by university students against the war and Bashar al Assad and his government. It was in response to the raid on Aleppo university in may 2012 and Homs student campus. Hunger demonstrations also erupted sparked by the mounting hunger and increasing poverty. Between May and August, hundreds in western and northern Syria have organised anti-government street protests and hunger strikes and demonstrations against poverty which was met with force like tear gas but university students kept ongoing until fighting became more common so protesters ended their peaceful protest movement.

== Deaths ==
- January 11 – Gilles Jacquier, French journalist
- February 22 – Rémi Ochlik, French journalist and Marie Colvin, American journalist
- March 26 – Jawan Mohammed Qatna, Syrian journalist, murdered
- May 28 – Bassel Shehadeh
- July 18 – Dawoud Rajiha, Assef Shawkat and Hasan Turkmani
- July 20 – Hisham Ikhtiyar
- August 20 – Mika Yamamoto
- September 26 – Maya Nasser
