= 2011 in Syria =

- Decades: 1990s; 2000s; 2010s; 2020s
- See also: History of Syria; Timeline of Syrian history; List of years in Syria

The following lists events that happened during 2011 in Syria.

== Incumbents ==
Office	Image	Name	Assumed office / Current length
President of the Syrian Arab Republic		Bashar al-Assad	17 July 2000 (26 years ago)
Vice President of the Syrian Arab Republic		Farouk al-Shara	21 February 2006 (20 years ago)
Vice President of the Syrian Arab Republic		Najah al-Attar	23 March 2006 (20 years ago)
Speaker of the People's Assembly		Mohammad Jihad al-Laham	24 May 2012 (14 years ago)
Prime Minister of the Syrian Arab Republic		Muhammad Naji al-Otari	10 September 2003 – 14 April 2011
Prime Minister of the Syrian Arab Republic		Adel Safar	14 April 2011 (15 years ago)

== Events ==
For events related to the Civil War, see Timeline of the Syrian Civil War (January–April 2011), Timeline of the Syrian Civil War (May–August 2011) and Timeline of the Syrian Civil War (September–December 2011)

July

- Syria al-Shaab satellite broadcast channel is founded.

== Deaths ==
- 25, May – Hamza al-Khateeb, murder victim (born 1997)
- 4, July – Ibrahim Qashoush, murder victim (born 1977)
