= Ḥumāt ad-Diyār =

National anthem of Syria

English: Guardians of the Homeland
- حُمَاةَ الدَّيَّارِ
- National anthem of Syria (de jure) Former national anthem of the Syrian Republics and Ba'athist Syria
- Lyrics: Khalil Mardam Bey, 1936
- Music: Mohammed Flayfel, 1936
- Adopted: 1938
- Readopted: 1961
- Relinquished: 1958, 2024 (briefly, de facto)
- Preceded by: Walla Zaman Ya Selahy and Sūriyā, Yā Dhāt al-Majdi

Audio sample
- U.S. Navy Band instrumental version (one verse) in A-flat major: file; help

"Ḥumāt ad-Diyār" (Arabic: حُمَاةَ الدَّيَّارِ, lit. 'Guardians of the Homeland') was written as the national anthem of Syria, (Note: Syria has been governed by a transitional government since the fall of the Assad regime on 8 December 2024, and it remains unclear whether this song will continue to be used as the national anthem. In March 2025, President Ahmed al-Sharaa signed the Constitutional Declaration, whose Article 5 states that the national anthem shall be determined by law.) with lyrics written by Khalil Mardam Bey and the music by Mohammed Salim Flayfel, who also composed the national anthem of Iraq as well as other Arab folk songs.

== History ==
Salam Affandina and Humat ad-Diyar, performed together as the anthem of the United Arab Republic between 1958 and 1960.

It was adopted in 1938 after a competition held by Hashim al-Atassi's government to choose a state anthem for the new republic two years after the Franco-Syrian Treaty of Independence was signed which gave Syria limited autonomy and future independence. The anthem was initially set to lose to Fī Sabīli al-Majd in the competition, but it later won the competition after it gained rapid popularity amongst the Syrian population which put pressure on the competition's committee to reconsider its decisions, and eventually the anthem won and was adopted by the government as Syria's national anthem.

It temporarily fell out of use when Syria joined the United Arab Republic with Egypt. On 22 February 1958, it was decided that the national anthem of the UAR would be a combination of the then Egyptian national anthem "Salam Affandina" and "Ḥumāt ad-Diyār". On 20 May 1960, it was replaced by Walla Zaman Ya Selahy, composed by Kamal Al Taweel. When Syria seceded from the union in 1961, it was fully restored and has since been used as Syria's official national anthem. The use of the anthem remains the only symbol used between the Socialist Arab Renaissance Party government and the Syrian opposition after the start of the civil war in 2011; In addition, another version of the anthem was played, but with partially altered lyrics to directly call for the fall of Bashar al-Assad's regime, which effectively occurred on 8 December 2024.

=== Post-Assad regime ===
On 18 January 2025, the Syrian Football Association announced to FIFA that it would make a series of changes when appearing in football matches. Among these changes, this included a new anthem, "Fī Sabīli al-Majd" ('In Pursuit of Glory') by the poet Omar Abu Risha, serving as a temporary national anthem until a permanent resolution regarding the official anthem could be determined. In March 2025, the Constitutional Declaration was signed by President Ahmed al-Sharaa, and Article 5 states that the national anthem shall be determined by law.

On 19 October 2025, al-Sharaa met with Minister of Culture Mohammed Yassin Saleh and a group of "several writers and poets", during which "arrangements related to the national anthem of the Syrian Arab Republic were addressed."

== Lyrics ==
Arabic original

١
حُـمَاةَ الـدِّيَارِ عَلَيْكُمْ سَـلَامْ
أَبَتْ أَنْ تَـذِلَّ النُّفُـوسُ الْكِرَامْ
عَـرِينُ الْعُرُوبَةِ بَيْتٌ حَـرَامْ
وَعَرْشُ الشُّمُوسِ حِمَىً لَا يُضَامْ

𝄇 رُبُوعُ الشَّـآمِ بُـرُوجُ الْعَـلَا
تُحَاكِي السَّـمَاءَ بِعَـالِي السَّـنَا 𝄆
فَأَرْضٌ زَهَتْ بِالشُّمُوسِ الْوِضَا
سَـمَاءٌ لَعَمْـرُكَ أَوْ كَالسَّـمَا

٢
رَفِيـفُ الْأَمَانِي وَخَفْـقُ الْفُؤَادْ
عَـلَىٰ عَـلَمٍ ضَمَّ شَـمْلَ الْبِلَادْ
أَمَا فِيهِ مِنْ كُـلِّ عَـيْنٍ سَـوَادْ
وَمِـنْ دَمِ كُـلِّ شَـهِيدٍ مِـدَادْ؟

𝄇 نُفُـوسٌ أُبَـاةٌ وَمَـاضٍ مَجِيـدْ
وَرُوحُ الْأَضَاحِي رَقِيبٌ عَـتِيدْ 𝄆
فَمِـنَّا الْوَلِيـدُ وَ مِـنَّا الرَّشِـيدْ
فَلِـمْ لَا نَسُودُ وَلِمْ لَا نَشِيدْ؟

Romanization of Arabic

I
Ḥumāt ad-diyāri ʿalaykum salām
ʾAbat ʾan taḏilla n-nufūsu l-kirām
ʿArīnu l-ʿurūbati baytun ḥarām
Wa-ʿaršu š-šumūsi ḥiman lā yuḍām

𝄆 Rubūʿu š-šaʾāmi burūju l-ʿalā
Tuḥākī s-samāʾa bi-ʿālī s-sanā 𝄇
Fa-ʾarḍun zahat bi-š-šumūsi l-wiḍā
Samāʾun la-ʿamruka ʾaw ka-s-samā

II
Rafīfu l-ʾamānī wa-xafqu l-fuʾād
ʿAla ʿalamin ḍamma šamla l-bilād
ʾAmā fīhi min kulli ʿaynin sawād
Wa-min dami kulli šahīdin midād?

𝄆 Nufūsun ʾubātun wa-māḍin majīd
Wa-rūḥu l-ʾaḍāḥī raqībun ʿatīd 𝄇
Fa-minnā l-Walīdu wa-minnā r-Rašīd
Fa-lim lā nasūdu wa-lim lā našīd?

IPA transcription (Note: See Help:IPA/Arabic and North Levantine Arabic.)

1
[ħʊ.mæːt æd.di.jæː.ri ʕɑ.læj.kʊm sæ.læːm]
[ʔæ.bæt ʔæn tæ.ðɪl.læ‿n.nʊ.fuː.sʊ‿l.ki.rɑːm]
[ʕɑ.riː.nʊ‿l.ʕʊ.ruː.bæ.ti bæj.tʊn ħɑ.rɑːm]
[wɑ ʕɑr.ʃʊ‿ʃ.ʃʊ.muː.sɪ ħɪ.mæn læː jʊ.dˤɑːm]

𝄆 [rʊ.buː.ʕʊ‿ʃ.ʃæ.ʔæː.mi bʊ.ruː.ʒʊ.l‿ʕɑ.læː]
[tʊ.ħæː.kiː‿s.sæ.mæː.ʔæ bɪ.ʕɑː.liː‿s.sæ.næː] 𝄇
[fɑ.ʔɑr.dˤʊn zæ.hæt bɪʃ.ʃʊ.muː.sɪ‿l.wɪ.dˤɑ]
[sæ.mæː.ʔʊn læ.ʕɑm.ru.kæ ʔæw kæ‿s.sæ.mæː]

2
[rɑ.fiː.fʊ‿l.ʔæ.mæː.ni wɑ χɑf.qʊ‿l.fu.ʔæːd]
[ʕɑ.læː ʕɑ.læ.mɪn dˤɑm.mæ ʃæm.læ‿l.bi.læːd]
[ʔæ.mæː fiː.hi mɪn kʊl.lɪ ʕɑj.nɪn sæ.wæːd]
[wæ mɪn dæ.mi kʊl.li ʃæ.hiː.dɪn mi.dæːd]

𝄆 [nʊ.fuː.sʊn ʔu.bæː.tʊn wɑ mɑː.dˤɪn mæ.ʒiːd]
[wɑ ruː.hʊ‿l.ʔɑ.dˤɑː.ħɪ rɑ.qɪː.bʊn ʕɑ.tiːd] 𝄇
[fæ.mɪn.næː‿l.wæ.liː.du wæ mɪn.næː‿r.ræ.ʃiːd]
[fæ.lɪm læː næ.suː.du wæ lɪm læː næ.ʃiːd]

English translation

1
Guardians of the homeland, upon you be peace,
our proud spirits refuse to be humiliated.
The den of Arabism is a sacred sanctuary,
and the throne of the suns is a preserve that will not be subjugated.

𝄆 The quarters of Levant are towers in height,
which are in dialogue with the zenith of the skies. 𝄇
A land resplendent with brilliant suns,
becoming another sky or almost a sky.

2
The flutter of hopes and the beat of the heart,
are on a flag that united the entire country.
Is there not blackness from every eye,
and ink from every martyr's blood?

𝄆 Our spirits are defiant and our history is glorious,
and our martyrs' souls are formidable guardians. 𝄇
From us is "Al-Walid" and from us is "ar-Rashid",
Thy glory comes from us, my homeland!

== See also ==
- "Mawtini", the national anthem of Iraq and formerly Palestine, also composed by Mohammed Flayfel
- National symbols of Syria
