= 2013 in Syria =

- Decades: 1990s; 2000s; 2010s; 2020s
- See also: History of Syria; Timeline of Syrian history; List of years in Syria

Events from the year 2013 in Syria.

== Incumbents ==
| Office | Image | Name | Assumed office / Current length |
|---|---|---|---|
| President of the Syrian Arab Republic | | Bashar al-Assad | 17 July 2000 (26 years ago) |
| Vice President of the Syrian Arab Republic | | Farouk al-Shara | 21 February 2006 (20 years ago) |
| Vice President of the Syrian Arab Republic | | Najah al-Attar | 23 March 2006 (20 years ago) |
| Speaker of the People's Assembly | | Mohammad Jihad al-Laham | 24 May 2012 (14 years ago) |
| President of the Supreme Constitutional Court | | Adnan Zureiq | 2 September 2012 (13 years ago) |
| Prime Minister of the Syrian Arab Republic | | Wael Nader al-Halqi | 9 August 2012 (13 years ago) |

== Events ==
For events related to the Civil War, see Timeline of the Syrian Civil War (January–April 2013) and Timeline of the Syrian Civil War (May–December 2013)

=== February ===
- 9 February - President of Syria Bashar al-Assad reshuffles his cabinet, appointing seven new ministers in a move analysts describe as an attempt to stabilize the country's economy.

=== March ===
- 29 March - During a U.N. conference, Iran, North Korea and Syria block adoption of a United Nations treaty that would regulate the international arms trade, a proposal which required agreement from all 193 UN member states to be adopted at the conference. A spokesman for Kenya and other countries, including the U.S., then asked the treaty be brought before the General Assembly, where unanimity is not required.

=== April ===
- 2 April - The United Nations General Assembly approves the first Arms Trade Treaty to regulate the multibillion-dollar global trade in conventional arms with 154 votes in favor, three member states – Iran, North Korea and Syria – against the decision, and 23 abstentions.

== Deaths ==
- Slimane Hadj Abderrahmane
- November 17 - Abdul Qader Saleh, commander of Al-Tawhid Brigade

== See also ==
- Syrian civil war
