= Aref al-Shaal =

Syrian lawyer

- عارف الشعل

Member of the Supreme Constitutional Court
- Incumbent
- Assumed office 11 July 2026
- Appointed by: Ahmed al-Sharaa

Personal details
- Education: University of Damascus
- Occupation: Lawyer and Professor

Aref Ahmed al-Shaal (Note: Arabic: عارف أحمد الشعال) is a Syrian lawyer and professor who has served as a member of the Supreme Constitutional Court since July 2026. He was known for his opposition to the Assad regime and appeared on television programs, where he provided legal analyses of legislative and constitutional developments. In July 2026, he was appointed as a member of the Supreme Constitutional Court by Syrian President Ahmed al-Sharaa. Al-Shaal took the constitutional oath before al-Sharaa at the People’s Palace and began his duties on 11 July 2026.

== Biography ==
Al-Shaal graduated from the Faculty of Law at the University of Damascus and worked as a lawyer and legal expert. He also participated in recent years in several committees tasked with reviewing and amending Syrian laws as part of efforts to modernize the legislative system. Al-Shaal was known for his opposition to the Assad regime and appeared on television programs, where he provided legal analyses of legislative and constitutional developments. He participated in debates on judicial independence, the Syrian Bar Association, exceptional courts, the death penalty, and transitional justice.

== Career ==
On 7 July 2026, President al-Sharaa issued a decree appointing al-Shaal as a member of the Supreme Constitutional Court, with six additional members also appointed to the court. Al-Shaal and the members of the court took the constitutional oath before al-Sharaa at the People’s Palace in Damascus on 11 July, and formally assumed their duties. Speaking to the Syrian Arab News Agency on 20 July 2026, al-Shaal said the court may review laws upon a constitutional challenge by the president or a specified number of People's Assembly members. He added that if the court rules a law unconstitutional, it cannot be promulgated, and that the court may also issue non-binding constitutional interpretations or advisory opinions at the request of the president or the speaker of the People's Assembly.

== Political positions ==
In January 2025, al-Shaal said that Ahmed al-Sharaa was operating in a constitutional vacuum and was dangerously expanding his authority. In July 2025, al-Shaal called on media outlets to interview the members of the constitutional drafting committee to clarify the legality of the decrees and emphasized that exceeding one’s powers must lead to legal and political accountability.
