= Jaysh al-Ummah (Syria) =

Syrian Rebel Group

Jaysh al-Ummah Army of the Ummah
- جيش الأمة
- Leaders: Ahmad Taha (POW); Nizar Khabbini; Majid Khayba (executed)
- Dates active: 19 September 2014 – 9 March 2015
- Groups: Lions of Ghouta Brigade; Lions of Justice Brigade; Douma Martyrs Brigade; Arbin Martyrs Brigade; Conquest of al-Sham Brigade; Farouq Omar Brigade; Supporters of the Ummah Brigade; Special Task Force
- Headquarters: Douma, Syria
- Active regions: Rif Dimashq Governorate
- Ideology: Islamism
- Size: 1,500+
- Wars: the Syrian civil war

The Jaysh al-Ummah (Arabic: جيش الأمة; lit. Army of the Ummah) was a coalition of 20 small rebel groups active during the Syrian Civil War. The group operated in Damascus and Rif Dimashq Governorate. It was disbanded on 9 March 2015, after it was defeated by Jaysh al-Islam and its remaining fighters defected to the Syrian government forces in Eastern Ghouta.

== History ==
On 19 September 2014, 10 small rebel groups formed the Jaysh al-Ummah. The leader of Jaysh al-Islam, part of the Islamic Front, Zahran Alloush, condemned the formation by saying that "there cannot be two heads for the same body". This immediately resulted in tensions and sporadic clashes between the two groups.

On 29 September 2014, the leader of Jaysh al-Ummah survived an assassination attempt, but his deputy was killed. On 19 October 2014, a second assassination attempt was made on him. The attack wounded him and killed his son.

On 1 January 2015, the newly formed Lions of Justice Brigade joined the coalition.

On 3 January 2015, two leaders of Jaysh al-Ummah were assassinated by unknown gunmen. The next day, Jaysh al-Islam declared war on Jaysh al-Ummah and captured its leader and seized its headquarters in Douma within a span of 6 hours. It also issued an arrest warrant against the deputy Nizar Khabbini. During the clashes, the Lions of Ghouta Brigade surrendered to Jaysh al-Islam, while 1,500 members of Jaysh al-Ummah were invited to join the ranks of the Islamic Front. Majid Khayba, commander of Jaysh al-Ummah's Douma Martyrs Brigade, was also captured. On 1 September 2015, he was executed by Jaysh al-Islam by firing squad.

On 9 March 2015, the remaining fighters of the Jaysh al-Ummah in Eastern Ghouta, alongside al-Anfal Brigade, defected to Syrian government forces.

== See also ==
- List of armed groups in the Syrian Civil War
