= National Dialogue Conference =

National Dialogue Conference may refer to:

- National Dialogue Conference (Yemen), 2013–2014
- Syrian National Dialogue Conference, 2025
