= Rayan Kahilan =

Syrian academic

- ريان كحيلان

Member of the Supreme Constitutional Court
- Incumbent
- Assumed office 11 July 2026
- Appointed by: Ahmed al-Sharaa

Personal details
- Education: University of Damascus (LL.D.)
- Occupation: Academic

Rayan Hassan Kahilan (Note: Arabic: ريان حسن كحيلان, also transliterated as Riyan Hassan Kahilan) is a Syrian academic who has served as a member of the Supreme Constitutional Court since July 2026. She was a member of the Constitutional Declaration Drafting Committee. In July 2026, she was appointed as a member of the Supreme Constitutional Court by Syrian President Ahmed al-Sharaa. Al-Khalfan took the constitutional oath before al-Sharaa at the People’s Palace and began her duties on 11 July 2026.

== Biography ==
Kahilan has served as Head of the Public Law Department at the Faculty of Law at the University of Damascus and has also worked as a professor at the Syrian Virtual University since January 2025. She earned a doctorate in public law from the University of Damascus and completed an academic specialization in constitutional law in France. She was previously involved in constitutional matters under the Assad regime.

== Career ==
Kahilan was a member of the Constitutional Declaration Drafting Committee and appeared in several media interviews to explain its provisions. She stressed that the Constitutional Declaration guaranteed freedoms for all components of the Syrian people and abolished the exceptional courts associated with the Assad regime. She has tried to maintain political neutrality.

On 7 July 2026, President Ahmed al-Sharaa issued a decree appointing Kahilan as a member of the Supreme Constitutional Court, with six additional members also appointed to the court. Kahilan and the members of the court took the constitutional oath before al-Sharaa at the People’s Palace in Damascus on 11 July, and formally assumed their duties.
