= Issam al-Khalif =

President of the Supreme Constitutional Court of Syria since 2026

- عصام خالد الخليف

President of the Supreme Constitutional Court
- Incumbent
- Assumed office 11 July 2026
- Appointed by: Ahmed al-Sharaa
- Preceded by: Mohammad Jihad al-Laham^{[a]}

Member of the Supreme Constitutional Court
- Incumbent
- Assumed office 11 July 2026
- Appointed by: Ahmed al-Sharaa

Personal details
- Born: Issam Khaled al-Khalif c. 1981 Ghab Plain, Hama Governorate, Syria
- Education: Damascus University (LL.B.); University of Aleppo; Idlib University (Ph.D)
- Occupation: Jurist and academic
- Vacant from 8 December 2024 to 11 July 2026.

Issam Khaled al-Khalif (Note: Arabic: عصام خالد الخليف) (born c. 1981) is a Syrian jurist and academic who has served as the President of the Supreme Constitutional Court since July 2026.

Born in the Ghab Plain, Hama Governorate, Syria, he earned a law degree from Damascus University in 2005 and a master's degree in Private Law from the University of Aleppo in 2013, before obtaining a Ph.D. in Law from Idlib University in 2023. He began his career as an income controller at the Hama Finance Directorate in 2010 and defected from the Assad regime in 2013.

In 2015, he joined Idlib University as a lecturer in the College of Sharia and Law, where he later held several administrative positions. Al-Khalif served as Secretary-General of the Syrian Salvation Government (SSG) from 2018 and later as Chairman of the SSG Central Committee for Laws from 2022 to 2024. In 2024, he became President of both the Supreme Committee for the Shura Council Elections and the SSG Central Authority for Oversight and Inspection.

During the post-Assad period, he published numerous studies and research papers on comparative law and Islamic jurisprudence. In July 2026, Syrian President Ahmed al-Sharaa appointed al-Khalif as President of the Supreme Constitutional Court. Al-Khalif took the constitutional oath before al-Sharaa at the People's Palace and assumed his duties on 11 July 2026.

== Early life ==
Al-Khalif was born in 1981 in the Ghab Plain, Hama Governorate, Syria. He earned a law degree from Damascus University in 2005 and a master's degree in Private Law from the University of Aleppo in 2013 for a thesis entitled The Contract for the Use of a Corpse for Academic Achievement Purposes: A Comparative Study, before obtaining a Ph.D. in Law from Idlib University in 2023.

== Career ==
Al-Khalif began his career as an income controller at the Hama Finance Directorate in 2010 before defecting from the Assad regime on 1 October 2013. In 2015, he joined Idlib University as a lecturer in the College of Sharia and Law, where he later held several administrative positions, including Director of the Public Relations Office, Head of the Central Law Committee, and a member of the university’s Board of Trustees in 2017. He later served as Secretary of Idlib University from 2019 to 2022.

Al-Khalif served as Secretary-General of the Syrian Salvation Government (SSG) from 2018 and later as Chairman of the SSG Central Committee for Laws from 2022 to 2024. In 2024, he became President of both the Supreme Committee for the Shura Council Elections and the Central Authority for Oversight and Inspection within the SSG.

=== Post-Assad period ===
Following the fall of the Assad regime, al-Khalif served as Chairman of the Central Authority for Control and Inspection until April 2025, when he became Assistant Chairman of the Authority. He later served as Deputy Head of the Syrian Central Authority for Supervision and Inspection and has published numerous studies and research papers on comparative law and Islamic jurisprudence.

== President of the Supreme Constitutional Court ==
On 7 July 2026, President Ahmed al-Sharaa issued a decree appointing al-Khalif as President of the Supreme Constitutional Court and appointing six additional members to the court. Al-Khalif and the members of the court took the constitutional oath before al-Sharaa at the People’s Palace in Damascus on 11 July, and formally assumed their duties. As President of the Supreme Constitutional Court, he chaired its inaugural meeting on 19 July, during which the court began drafting legislation to regulate its functions and define its jurisdiction before finalizing the draft law for submission to the relevant authorities.

== Notes ==
Legal offices
Preceded by Mohammad Jihad al-Laham (2024)	President of the Supreme Constitutional Court; 2026–present	Incumbent
