= Khairallah Ghanoum =

Syrian judge

- خير الله غنوم

Member of the Supreme Constitutional Court
- Incumbent
- Assumed office 11 July 2026
- Appointed by: Ahmed al-Sharaa

Personal details
- Occupation: Judge

Khairallah Nadim Ghanoum (Note: Arabic: خير الله نديم غانم) is a Syrian judge who has served as a member of the Supreme Constitutional Court since July 2026. Ghanoum previously served as an adviser to the Court of Appeal in Homs before defecting from the Assad regime. Following his defection, he became involved in the judicial institutions established in opposition-held areas. In 2015, Ghanoum participated in the announcement of the establishment of the Supreme Command Council of the Free Syrian Army, and in 2018 he became president of the Court of Cassation established in Aleppo Governorate. After the fall of the Assad regime, he returned to the judicial institution. In August 2025, he was appointed as an adviser to the Court of Cassation in Damascus.

In July 2026, he was appointed as a member of the Supreme Constitutional Court by Syrian President Ahmed al-Sharaa. Ghanoum took the constitutional oath before al-Sharaa at the People’s Palace and began his duties on 11 July 2026.

== Biography ==
Ghanoum spent many years in the Syrian judiciary, serving in several judicial positions. He previously served as an adviser to the Court of Appeal in Homs before defecting from the Assad regime. Following his defection, Ghanoum became involved in the judicial institutions established in opposition-held areas. In 2015, he participated in the announcement of the establishment of the Supreme Command Council of the Free Syrian Army, and in 2018 he became president of the Court of Cassation established in Aleppo Governorate.

After the fall of the Assad regime, Ghanoum returned to the judicial institution. In August 2025, he was appointed as an adviser to the Court of Cassation in Damascus.

== Career ==
On 7 July 2026, President Ahmed al-Sharaa issued a decree appointing Ghanoum as a member of the Supreme Constitutional Court, with six additional members also appointed to the court. Ghanoum and the members of the court took the constitutional oath before al-Sharaa at the People’s Palace in Damascus on 11 July, and formally assumed their duties.
