= Constitutional Declaration of the Syrian Arab Republic =

Transitional constitution of Syria since 2025

Overview
- Original title: الإعلان الدستوري للجمهورية العربية السورية
- Jurisdiction: Syria
- Created: 2 March 2025
- Ratified: 13 March 2025
- Date effective: 13 March 2025
- System: Unitary presidential republic

Government structure
- Branches: Three (executive, legislative and judiciary)
- Head of state: President
- Chambers: Unicameral (People's Assembly)
- Executive: President as head of government
- Judiciary: Supreme Judicial Council, Supreme Constitutional Court
- Federalism: No
- First legislature: 12 July 2026
- First executive: 29 March 2025
- First court: 11 July 2026
- Author: Legal Committee for Drafting the Constitutional Declaration
- Signatories: Ahmed al-Sharaa
- Supersedes: Constitution of 2012

Full text
- Constitutional Declaration of Syria at Wikisource
- الإعلان الدستوري للجمهورية العربية السورية at Arabic Wikisource

The Constitutional Declaration of the Syrian Arab Republic, also known as the Interim Constitution of Syria, is the current provisional constitution of Syria, approved by President Ahmed al-Sharaa. It establishes the constitutional framework for a five-year transitional period.

Following the fall of the Assad regime, Hassan Abdul Ghani, spokesman for the Military Operations Command, announced the repeal of the 2012 Syrian Constitution. Al-Sharaa subsequently stated that he would issue a "constitutional declaration" to serve as a legal framework until a new constitution was adopted. On 2 March 2025, al-Sharaa formed a committee to draft the constitutional declaration for the country's transitional period. He signed the declaration on 13 March, and it was set to remain in effect for five years. The declaration states that it is based on the values, cultural heritage, and diversity of Syrian society, as well as national and humanitarian principles. It also draws on previous Syrian constitutions, particularly the Syrian Constitution of 1950, and establishes a framework for governance during the transitional period.

Under the declaration, legislative power is vested in the People's Assembly, executive power is exercised by the government under the leadership of the president, and judicial power is vested in an independent judiciary, with judges subject to the law. The declaration establishes a presidential system in which executive authority is exercised by the president. The declaration may be amended with the approval of two-thirds of the People's Assembly following a proposal by the President of Syria.

== Background ==
The 2024 Syrian opposition offensives, codenamed "Deterrence of Aggression," were led by Hay'at Tahrir al-Sham (HTS) and supported by allied Turkish-backed groups in the Syrian National Army. These offensives resulted in the rapid fall of Bashar al-Assad's government, ending five decades of rule by the Assad family that began when Hafez al-Assad assumed power in 1971 under the Ba'ath Party following a coup d'état. As a rebel coalition moved closer to Damascus, reports indicated that Bashar al-Assad had fled the capital by plane to Russia, where he joined his exiled family and was granted political asylum by the Russian government. After his departure, opposition forces announced their victory on state television. At the same time, Russia's Ministry of Foreign Affairs confirmed his resignation and departure from Syria.

On 29 December 2024, Syria TV reported that preparations were underway for a National Conference of 1,200 representatives for which the date has not been decided yet. Syria TV said that during the National Conference, the constitutional drafting committee would be announced and that during the conference, the People's Assembly of Syria and all armed factions including HTS would be dissolved, leading to the restructuring of a new national army. Later that day, Syria's then-de facto leader Ahmed al-Sharaa stated that elections could take up to 4 years to be organized, with the need to conduct a census beforehand.

=== Constitutional changes ===
After the regime change, al-Sharaa was formally appointed president of Syria by the Syrian General Command for the transitional period during the Syrian Revolution Victory Conference in Damascus on 29 January 2025. Before this, he had served as the de facto leader following the fall of the Assad regime. In his first address as president on 31 January 2025, al-Sharaa stated that he would issue a "constitutional declaration" to serve as a "legal reference" until a new constitution was established.

After a meeting of the armed groups that took part in the offensive against the Assad regime, these groups simultaneously agreed to abolish the 2012 constitution of Ba'athist Syria and initiate the drafting of a replacement document. While the Assad regime's fall was celebrated by many Syrians, the subsequent establishment of Islamist leadership generated uncertainty among the country's religious minorities, with many communities expressing reluctance to accept Damascus's authority in their regions. During the Syrian Revolution Victory Conference, Hassan Abdul Ghani, spokesman for the Military Operations Command, announced the repeal of the 2012 constitution.

On 12 February 2025, the caretaker government announced the formation of a preparatory committee for the then-upcoming Syrian National Dialogue Conference, comprising seven members: Hassan al-Daghim, Maher Alloush, Mohammed Mastet, Youssef al-Hijr, Mustafa al-Moussa, Hind Kabawat, and Huda Atassi. The conference faced criticism for inadequate representation of Syria's diverse communities and civic organizations.

== Legal Committee for Drafting the Constitutional Declaration ==
Legal Committee for Drafting the Constitutional Declaration
- Constitutional committee
- De facto emblem of Syria

Type
- Type: Provisional

History
- Founded: 2 March 2025
- Disbanded: 13 March 2025

Structure
- Seats: 7
- Length of term: No term length

On 2 March 2025, Syrian President Ahmed al-Sharaa announced the establishment of a committee tasked with drafting a new constitutional declaration to guide the country's transition. The next day, the Legal Committee for Drafting the Constitutional Declaration stated that it was responsible for writing the constitutional declaration after studying the key principles and articles to be included, which serve the country’s interests and meet the requirements of the transitional period. The committee stated that once the drafting process was completed, the proposal would be submitted to the President of Syria.

According to the Constitutional Drafting Committee, the declaration consists of a preamble and four sections covering general provisions, rights and freedoms, the structure of government, and final provisions. The drafting committee noted that executive power would be vested in the president, who would be assisted by ministers. It stated that keeping executive power exclusively in the hands of the president during the transitional period was considered appropriate to enable swift action in addressing challenges and difficulties. The committee further clarified that no authority would have the power to dismiss or remove another, and that the legislature would not have the authority to question the president. Instead, the president would be subject to accountability before a constitutional court, whose judges the president would have the authority to appoint.

In July 2026, two members of the Constitutional Declaration Drafting Committee, Ismail al-Khalfan and Rayan Kahilan, were appointed by al-Sharaa to the Supreme Constitutional Court, while Abdul Hamid al-Awak, another member of the Drafting Committee, was elected Speaker of the People's Assembly during the assembly's inaugural session.

=== Official name of Syria ===
The Drafting Committee clarified that it had not altered any of the general provisions, including the country's official name, which remains the "Syrian Arab Republic." The committee stated that it chose to retain the name because it had been used since the establishment of the state and because its mandate did not permit changes to fundamental provisions. According to SyriacPress, the decision to retain the name came amid calls from some Kurdish, Syriac, Assyrian, Aramean, and other non-Arab communities to rename the country the "Syrian Republic," citing the country's ethnic and linguistic diversity.

Rudaw Media Network reported that the drafting committee said the country would retain its official name, the "Syrian Arab Republic", as established in the previous 1920 constitution.

=== Ratification of the Constitutional Declaration ===
On 13 March 2025, President al-Sharaa ratified the Constitutional Declaration, which was set to remain in effect for five years. During the signing ceremony, al-Sharaa stated, "We hope this marks a new history for Syria, where injustice is replaced with justice, ignorance with knowledge, and suffering with mercy." At a press conference, the Drafting Committee tasked with preparing the Constitutional Declaration stated that it had completed the required work from the outset of its formation and had based the declaration on the outcomes of the National Dialogue Conference.

== Overview ==
The Constitutional Declaration states that it is based on the values, cultural heritage, and diversity of Syrian society, as well as established national and humanitarian principles. It also draws on previous Syrian constitutions, particularly the Syrian Constitution of 1950, and seeks to establish a framework for constitutional governance.

Under the Constitutional Declaration, the powers of the three branches of government are distributed during the transitional period as follows: legislative power is vested in the People's Assembly; executive power is exercised by the government under the leadership of the president; and judicial power is vested in an independent judiciary, with judges subject only to the law. The Constitutional Declaration may be amended with the approval of two-thirds of the People's Assembly upon a proposal by the President of Syria, while existing legislation remains in force unless amended or repealed; the transitional period lasts for five calendar years from the date the declaration enters into force and ends with the adoption of a permanent constitution and the holding of elections in accordance with it.

=== States ===
According to the Constitutional Declaration, Syria is an independent and fully sovereign state and an indivisible geographical and political unit. Arabic is the official language, and Damascus is the capital. The state is committed to preserving Syria's territorial unity and criminalizing calls for division, secession, foreign intervention, or external support. It also seeks to promote social coexistence and stability, preserve civil peace, prevent sectarianism and incitement to violence, and protect the cultural and linguistic rights of all Syrians. The declaration further provides for combating corruption and violent extremism while protecting rights and freedoms. It calls for cooperation with relevant states, entities, and international organizations to support Syria's reconstruction and facilitate the voluntary return of refugees and displaced persons.

The national economy is directed toward social justice, economic development, increased production, and improving living standards. It is based on free and fair competition and the prevention of monopolies, while the state promotes investment and provides legal protections for investors. The declaration states that the glorification of the former Assad regime and its symbols, as well as the denial, praise, justification, or minimization of its crimes, are criminal offenses punishable by law.

=== Syrian anthem, emblem, and flag ===
The current flag of Syria, known as the flag of the Syrian Arab Republic, is defined in the Constitutional Declaration with a 2:3 proportion and consists of three equal horizontal stripes—green, white, and black—with three red stars in the center of the white stripe.

The Constitutional Declaration states in Article 5 that the national anthem and emblem shall be determined by law. Although Syria currently uses "Fī Sabīli al-Majd" ("In Pursuit of Glory") by poet Omar Abu Risha, it is used as a temporary national anthem until a permanent decision is made regarding the official anthem.

The short-lived emblem featured a new escutcheon based on the flag of Syria used upon gaining independence from France in 1946, with the Hawk of Quraish facing dexter rather than sinister. It was used de facto from 2024 to 2025, although it was never officially adopted. While the emblem was visually depicted throughout the Constitutional Declaration, it was not mentioned in the text. In July 2025, the Syrian government formally adopted the current emblem of Syria de jure, featuring a gold-colored eagle facing to its right, with three five-pointed stars arranged in an arc above its head.

The Constitutional Declaration defines the Syrian flag as follows: it is rectangular, with a length equal to two-thirds of its width, consisting of three equal horizontal rectangles—green at the top, white in the middle, and black at the bottom—with three red stars in the center of the white section.

The short-lived emblem (left) was used de facto from 2024 to 2025, although it was never officially adopted. While it was visually depicted throughout the Constitutional Declaration, it was not mentioned in the text. The current emblem was formally adopted de jure in July 2025 (right).

=== Armed forces ===
According to Article 9 of the Constitutional Declaration, the Syrian Army is a professional national institution responsible for protecting the country and preserving its security, safety, and territorial integrity in accordance with the rule of law and human rights. The state has exclusive authority to establish the army, while individuals, organizations, and groups are prohibited from forming military or paramilitary forces, and the possession of weapons is restricted to the state.

=== Human rights ===
According to the Constitutional Declaration, citizens are equal before the law in rights and duties, without discrimination based on race, religion, gender, or lineage. The state guarantees human rights and fundamental freedoms, including those recognized in international human rights treaties, charters, and agreements ratified by the Syrian Arab Republic. The declaration guarantees freedom of opinion, expression, information, publication, and the press, and protects the sanctity of private life. It also guarantees freedom of movement, including the right to return to the country. Private property is protected and may only be expropriated for the public benefit with fair compensation, while public funds and natural resources are considered public property and are to be managed for the benefit of society. The declaration states that the state shall protect the right to political participation and the formation of political parties on national foundations in accordance with a new law. It also guarantees the right of associations and unions to operate.

The declaration establishes that punishment is personal and that no crime or punishment exists without a legal basis. It guarantees the right to litigation, defense, and appeal, prohibits immunity from judicial review, and establishes the presumption of innocence until a final court judgment. It also prohibits enforced disappearance and physical or psychological torture, with torture offenses not subject to a statute of limitations. Arrest, detention, or restrictions on personal liberty generally require a judicial decision, except in cases of flagrante delicto. Homes are protected from unlawful entry or search. The declaration recognizes the family as the foundation of society and requires the state to protect it. The state is required to protect the dignity and rights of women, including their social, economic, and political rights, and to protect them from oppression, injustice, and violence. It also protects children from exploitation and abuse and guarantees their rights to education and health care. The rights and freedoms established by the declaration are exercised in accordance with the law and may be subject to limitations necessary for national security, territorial integrity, public safety, public order, crime prevention, or the protection of public health or morals.

=== Religion ===
According to the Constitutional Declaration, the religion of the President of Syria is Islam, and Islamic jurisprudence is the principal source of legislation. The declaration protects freedom of belief, respects all divine religions, and guarantees the freedom to practice their rituals, provided that public order is not disturbed. It also protects and respects the personal status of religious communities in accordance with the law.

=== Transitional Justice and Commission ===
According to the Constitutional Declaration, the state is required to establish transitional justice by repealing exceptional laws that violated human rights, overturning unjust rulings issued by the Anti-Terrorism Court, including the restoration of confiscated property, and abolishing exceptional security measures concerning civil and real estate records that were used to suppress the Syrian people. Article 49 provides for the establishment of a Transitional Justice Commission to adopt effective and consultative mechanisms focused on victims, accountability, the right to truth, and justice for victims and survivors, as well as honoring those who were killed. War crimes, crimes against humanity, genocide, and other crimes committed by the former regime are exempt from the principle of non-retroactivity.

== Government During the Transitional Period ==
=== Executive ===
The Constitutional Declaration sets a presidential system with executive power in the hands of the president, who appoints the ministers, without the position of prime minister.

==== President of Syria ====
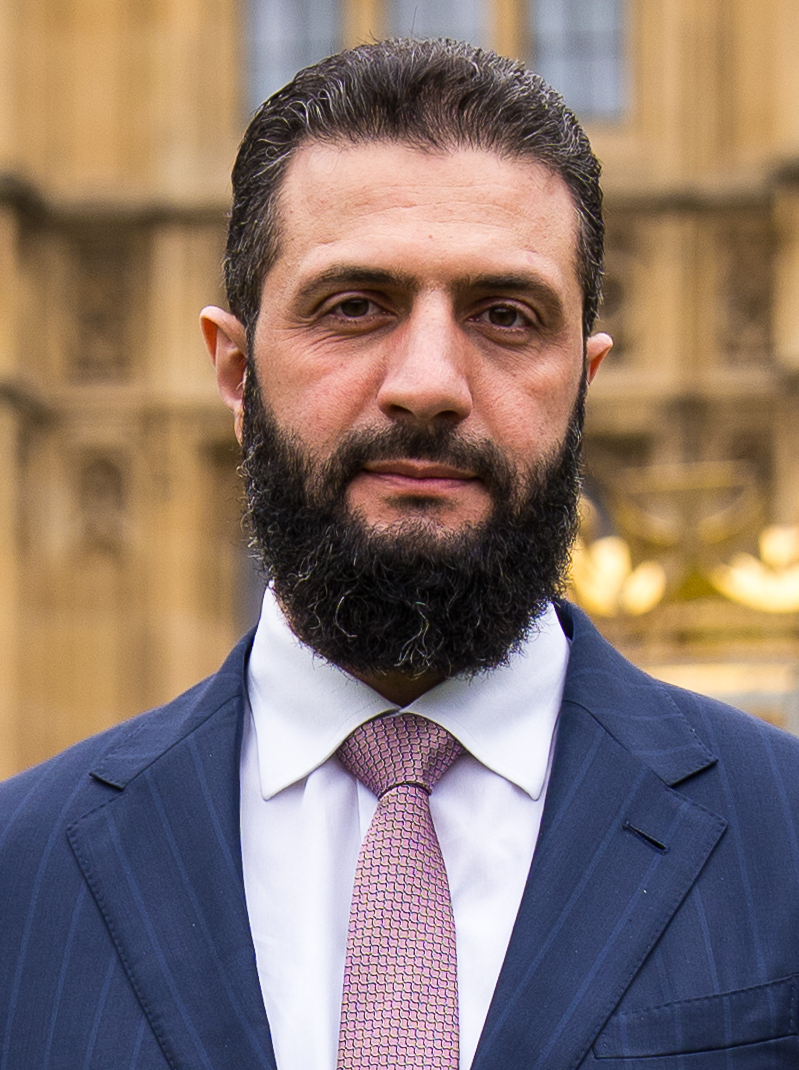
Ahmed al-Sharaa, President of Syria, exercises executive power as defined by the Constitutional Declaration.

According to the Constitutional Declaration, executive power is exercised by the President of Syria and the ministers within the limits established by the declaration. The President serves as the Supreme Commander of the Armed Forces and is responsible for managing the country's affairs, protecting its territorial integrity and security, and safeguarding the interests of the people. The President takes the constitutional oath before the People's Assembly.

The President appoints and dismisses ministers and accepts their resignations, while ministers take their constitutional oath before the President. The President issues executive and regulatory regulations, presidential orders, and decisions in accordance with the law. The President represents Syria and has the authority to sign treaties with other countries and international organizations. The President appoints and dismisses heads of diplomatic missions abroad and accepts the credentials of foreign diplomatic representatives accredited to Syria. The President has the right to propose laws and promulgates laws approved by the People's Assembly. The President may object to a law through a reasoned decision within one month of receiving it. If the People's Assembly subsequently approves the law by a two-thirds majority, the President is required to promulgate it by decree. The President may grant special pardons and restore honor.

The President declares general mobilization and war with the approval of the National Security Council. In cases of serious and immediate danger threatening national unity, the country's territorial integrity or independence, or the ability of state institutions to perform their constitutional duties, the President may declare a partial or complete state of emergency for a maximum period of three months, subject to the approval of the National Security Council and consultation with the Speaker of the People's Assembly and the President of the Constitutional Court. The state of emergency may not be extended for a second time without the approval of the People's Assembly.

==== Vice President of Syria ====
According to the Constitutional Declaration, the President may appoint one or more Vice Presidents, determine their powers, dismiss them, and accept their resignations. In the event of a vacancy in the presidency, the First Vice President assumes the powers of the President.

==== Role of the executive authority ====
According to the Constitutional Declaration, the executive authority is responsible for implementing laws, plans, and programmes, managing state affairs and public policies aimed at stability and development, preparing draft laws for the President to propose to the People's Assembly, preparing general state plans, managing public resources and ensuring their effective and transparent use, rebuilding public institutions and strengthening the rule of law and good governance, developing security institutions to maintain internal security and protect citizens' rights and freedoms, building a professional national army tasked with defending the country's borders and sovereignty and protecting the people in accordance with the law, and strengthening international relations and cooperation with international organizations in pursuit of national interests.

=== Legislative ===
The People's Assembly Building in Damascus, Syria, the seat of the Assembly, currently serves as the seat of the transitional assembly.

According to the Constitutional Declaration, legislative power is exercised by the People's Assembly. The President of Syria establishes a higher committee to select members of the People's Assembly, which supervises the formation of electoral subcommittees. These subcommittees elect two-thirds of the members, while the President of Syria appoints the remaining one-third to ensure representation and efficiency. Members of the People's Assembly enjoy parliamentary immunity and may be removed only with the approval of two-thirds of the Assembly's members.

The People's Assembly exercises legislative authority until a permanent constitution is adopted and legislative elections are held in accordance with that constitution. Its term is 30 months and may be renewed. At its first session, the Assembly shall elect a Speaker, two Deputy Speakers, and a Secretary by secret ballot and majority vote, with the oldest member presiding until the election. The Assembly is also required to adopt its internal rules of procedure within one month of its first session. The People's Assembly is responsible for proposing and approving laws, amending or repealing existing laws, ratifying international treaties, approving the state budget and general amnesties, and considering the resignation or removal of its members and the lifting of their immunity in accordance with its rules. It may also hold hearings for ministers, and its decisions are taken by majority vote.

=== Judiciary ===
According to the Constitutional Declaration, the judiciary of Syria is independent, with judges subject only to the law. The Supreme Judicial Council is responsible for ensuring the proper functioning and independence of the judiciary. The declaration prohibits the establishment of exceptional courts and provides that the judicial system consists of the ordinary and administrative judiciaries. The Supreme Judicial Council supervises the ordinary and military judiciaries, while the State Council is an independent judicial and advisory body responsible for administrative justice. The State Cases Administration is affiliated with the Ministry of Justice, with its jurisdiction regulated by law. The declaration also dissolves the existing Supreme Constitutional Court and establishes a new seven-member Supreme Constitutional Court, whose members are appointed by the President of Syria, with its powers and procedures regulated by law.

== Responses ==
=== Reactions and assessments ===
United Nations Special Envoy to Syria Geir Pedersen offered qualified support for the declaration, expressing hope that it would contribute to restoring rule of law and facilitate a comprehensive transition process. Pedersen additionally called for independent investigations into recent sectarian violence and attacks on Alawite civilians and urged Syria's interim leadership to collaborate with UN authorities on these matters.

Syrian journalist Saba Madour characterized the speech restrictions against denying Assad's crimes as advancing historical truth and supporting justice for victims of his regime, though she noted additional measures against Assad-sympathetic parties would be necessary for full accountability.

On 6 December 2025, at the Doha Forum, Syrian President Ahmed al-Sharaa told Christiane Amanpour, CNN's Chief International Anchor, that the Syrian National Dialogue Conference held following the liberation had resulted in a temporary constitutional declaration granting him a five-year mandate to enact new laws and draft a new constitution, with elections scheduled to take place four years later.

In an interview with Rudaw Media Network on 15 August 2026, Mazloum Abdi, the commander-in-chief of the Syrian Democratic Forces, said that the Constitutional Declaration had already been drafted before the March 10 agreement was signed and that they did not have the opportunity to incorporate the provisions they had agreed upon into the declaration. He said that if a new constitution is drafted, it should incorporate these agreements, particularly provisions concerning Kurdish rights and the Kurdish language. Abdi also stressed the need for political unity among Kurds to preserve these gains and ensure their inclusion in the Syrian constitution.

Abdul Hamid al-Awak, then a member of the Constitutional Declaration Drafting Committee and now Speaker of the People's Assembly, stated that adopting a permanent constitution required a stable political environment, elections, an elected constituent parliament, and broad social dialogue. He added that the Constitutional Declaration was not a permanent constitution but rather a transitional document intended to regulate the functioning of the state during the transitional period. Al-Awak said that the declaration sought to balance security concerns with rights and freedoms and provided for a strict separation of powers. Al-Awak said that the declaration enshrined women's right to participate in work and education and guaranteed their social, political, and economic rights. Under the declaration, the legislature cannot impeach the president, while the president cannot dismiss members of the legislature. Al-Awak also stated that a committee would be established to draft a new permanent constitution. He added that the President of Syria would have executive authority during the transitional period but would have only one "exceptional power", which was the right to declare a state of emergency. Rayan Kahilan, a member of the Constitutional Declaration Drafting Committee and now a member of the Supreme Constitutional Court, said, "No one has the authority to hold the President of the Republic accountable." She added that during sessions of the People's Assembly, members would only listen to ministers and would have no authority to take action against the president.

The Foundation for Defense of Democracies (FDD) noted that, whereas the 2012 Constitution allowed the president to dissolve the People's Assembly at will, the Constitutional Declaration does not grant the president such authority. However, FDD argued that the president retains significant influence over the legislature because of his role in appointing its members. FDD also identified similarities in the provisions concerning states of emergency. Article 103 of the 2012 Constitution empowered the president to declare or repeal a state of emergency in consultation with his ministers, while Article 41 of the 2025 Constitutional Declaration allows the president to declare a state of emergency with the approval of the National Security Council, whose members are appointed by the president and which he chairs.

The Legal Agenda argued that the Constitutional Declaration was adopted unilaterally and represented the "unilateral will of the president of the Republic." It characterized the declaration as a grant from President al-Sharaa to the Syrian people, comparing it to the Constitutional Charter granted by Louis XVIII to the French in 1814 and the constitution granted by Ottoman Sultan Abdulhamid II in 1876. The Legal Agenda noted that those constitutions did not specify procedures for their amendment, which it argued could indicate that the authority that issued them, and embodied constituent power, retained the power to amend them.

=== Criticism ===
The Syrian Democratic Council delivered sharp criticism, claiming that al-Sharaa was repeating Assad's constitutional approach. The council declared the document illegitimate and inconsistent with previously negotiated agreements between al-Sharaa and Syrian Democratic Forces leadership. They warned of increased violence, sectarianism, and authoritarianism in Syria. They specifically warned that emphasizing sharia in governance could precipitate renewed instability. Authorities in the mostly Kurdish Democratic Autonomous Administration of North and East Syria (DAANES) rejected the declaration. Their criticism focused on the document's perceived continuation of Ba'athist policies through different means and its inadequate recognition of Syria's ethnic and demographic diversity. The formal critique came just two days after DAANES had signed an agreement with Damascus's new authorities regarding integration into the Syrian state. Political analysts said that al-Sharaa consolidated his power by signing a constitutional declaration that granted sweeping powers to the presidency.

Druze spiritual leader Hikmat al-Hijri characterized the transitional government as "extremist" and categorically rejected possibilities for consensus. Al-Hijri questioned the government's legitimacy and suggested it could face international justice proceedings following the massacres against Alawite civilians occurring concurrently with the ratification of the constitution.

All powers are in the hands of the President at a time when we desperately need participatory decision-making. There is no true separation of powers—every authority is either controlled or appointed by Sharaa himself.

— Alia Mansour, Describing the Constitutional Declaration

Sam Dallah, a constitutional law professor and former spokesperson for the committee that drafted the 2012 constitution, who left Syria following the outbreak of the civil war, criticized the Constitutional Declaration, saying that it "grants absolute powers to the president." He said that it establishes "a presidential-type regime" in which executive power is vested in the president and the ministers appointed by him, without a prime ministerial position. Dallah questioned the separation of powers under the declaration, asking, "If the president directly or indirectly chooses the members of the People's Assembly, appoints and dismisses ministers, and appoints the members of the Constitutional Court, what remains of the principle of the separation of powers?" Adam Coogle, deputy Middle East director at Human Rights Watch, said, "Without stronger safeguards and independent oversight, this declaration risks consolidating executive control at the expense of fundamental freedoms at a crucial time for Syria’s future."

The Arab Center for Research and Policy Studies (ACRPS) reported that the Constitutional Declaration establishes an absolute presidential system, which has drawn criticism over its lack of a clear separation of powers. It noted that the President appoints one-third of the People's Assembly and selects a committee responsible for choosing its other members. The ACRPS said that the declaration also provides for an independent judiciary but does not specify how the Supreme Judicial Council will be formed. It further stated that the Supreme Constitutional Court would consist of seven members appointed by the President, with no role for the People's Assembly, raising concerns about the concentration of executive power. The ACRPS said that the Constitutional Declaration does not mention the word "democracy" or establish an electoral commission, raising concerns about whether Syrians will be able to organize elections and elect a legislative body after the five-year transitional period.

Syrian lawyer Ghazwan Kurunful criticized the concentration of executive power in the presidency, arguing that the Constitutional Declaration does not provide sufficient mechanisms for holding the president accountable. He rejected comparisons with the presidential system of the United States, stating that the U.S. president is subject to congressional oversight and can be questioned by Congress. Kurunful also argued that requiring the president to be Muslim is inconsistent with provisions guaranteeing equality before the law, stating that the religious requirement for the head of state conflicts with the principles of equal citizenship and equal opportunity in public office. He further argued that a constitution should provide a framework for national unity and inclusion rather than contribute to division among Syrians.

Dr. Muwaffaq Muhammad, a professor of international law at Rojava University's Faculty of Law, criticized the Constitutional Declaration, arguing that it "contradicts the democratic approach and nature of the Syrian state." He said that the use of the name "Syrian Arab Republic" gave the state a nationalist character that marginalized other communities, and argued that the declaration should have reflected Syria's ethnic and religious diversity, including Arabs, Kurds, Druze, Alawites, Christians, and Yazidis. Muhammad also criticized Article 20, which provides for the President of Syria to appoint the People's Assembly, arguing that the Assembly should instead be appointed by the people. He further pointed to an alleged inconsistency between Article 40, which provides for the Judicial Council to be formed by the executive authority, and Article 35, which affirms the independence of the judiciary.

Lawyer and human rights activist Khaled Omar criticized the Constitutional Declaration, saying that it "entrenches centralization and excludes Syrian components." He criticized the composition of the committee that drafted the declaration, saying, "The formation of the committee that prepared the declaration was wrong, as it did not represent all components. This declaration reproduces the previous regime with all its faults." Omar argued that "centralization is the root of the Syrian problem" and said that "instead of healing the wounds, the Damascus authorities have re-imposed a centralized system and excluded other components." He called for the repeal of the Constitutional Declaration and the formation of a new committee representing Syria's various communities to draft a constitution reflecting the aspirations of the Syrian revolution. Omar said, "A constitutional declaration based on a single color, language, and ethnicity is unacceptable. Syria is a diverse country, and its constitution must reflect this diversity." He further warned that "replacing one regime with another without fundamental change means creating a new dictatorship" and said that a new constitution should "express the hopes of the Syrian people who rose up for freedom and justice."

Samer Alnasir, an independent postdoctoral scholar, argued that the Constitutional Declaration provides a framework for transitional governance but does not constitute a "true self-constitution by the people." He said that, rather than establishing a political order based on inclusion, participation, and institutional checks and balances, the declaration largely reinforces centralized power. Alnasir described it as a temporary and highly centralized framework that lacks a fully inclusive, people-driven constitution and could perpetuate executive dominance. He questioned whether the declaration would serve as the foundation for a new political order or reinforce patterns of authoritarian governance in Syria.

=== Protests ===
On 14 March 2025, hundreds of Kurdish demonstrators protested the recently signed constitutional declaration in Qamishli, which they claimed failed to address the aspirations of Syria's minority populations. Critics feared that the extensive powers granted to the president could establish foundations for renewed authoritarian governance. Scrutiny was also given to the five-year transition period, with critics questioning whether al-Sharaa would adhere to this timeline given perceived breaches of previous commitments. The declaration's establishment of Islamic jurisprudence as the primary legislative source generated criticism from those concerned about implications for Syria's pluralistic society.

Protesters condemned further the constitution's lack of explicit recognition of Syrian minorities, including Kurds, Alawites, Christians, and the Druze, which many perceived as contradicting the declaration's stated guarantees of freedom of belief and legal equality for all citizens in favor of a Sunni-dominated state. Demonstrators chanted slogans calling for the "downfall of al-Julani", referring to al-Sharaa's nom de guerre. Additional protests took place in Amuda, with protesters advocating for a "democratic and federal" governance system to allow for Kurdish autonomy.

Democratic civil society organizations in the Tabqa Canton of the Democratic Autonomous Administration of North and East Syria organized a protest against the "Constitutional Declaration," with participation from representatives of several organizations, including unions of lawyers, farmers, teachers, and intellectuals. The protest was held outside their headquarters in Tabqa and concluded with a statement delivered by Ahmed Al-Ayed, a member of the Tabqa Lawyers Union, on behalf of the participating organizations. The statement said, "We fully reject the constitutional declaration proposed by the interim government and affirm that any outcome based on what is called the National Dialogue Conference will remain insufficient." It further stated that "this draft represents a reproduction of tyranny in a new form." The statement also criticized the draft for lacking clear mechanisms for transitional justice, which it said "further deepens the national crisis."

== See also ==
- Syrian Constitutional Committee, a UN-backed effort to create a new constitution for Syria during the civil war
- Constitution of the Democratic Autonomous Administration of North and East Syria
