= Supreme Constitutional Court =

Supreme Constitutional Court may refer to:

- Supreme Constitutional Court (Egypt)
- Supreme Constitutional Court (Syria)
