= Ismail al-Khalfan =

Syrian academic and professor (born 1981)

- إإسماعيل الخلفان

Member of the Supreme Constitutional Court
- Incumbent
- Assumed office 11 July 2026
- Appointed by: Ahmed al-Sharaa

Personal details
- Born: Ismail Hammadi al-Khalfan; 1981 (age 44–45) Azaz, Aleppo Governorate, Syria
- Education: University of Montpellier (Ph.D)
- Occupation: Academic and Professor

Ismail Hammadi al-Khalfan (Note: Arabic: إسماعيل حمادي الخلفان) (born c. 1981) is a Syrian academic and professor who has served as a member of the Supreme Constitutional Court since July 2026. He was an opposition figure associated with the Syrian National Coalition.

Born in Azaz, Aleppo Governorate, Syria, he obtained a doctorate from the University of Montpellier in France and served as a member of the teaching staff of the Faculty of Law at the International University of Science and Renaissance in Azaz. Al-Khalfan has also lectured at Gaziantep University in Turkey. Following the fall of the Assad regime, he was appointed to oversee the Faculty of Law at the University of Aleppo before later becoming Dean-designate of the Faculty. He also served as a member of the Constitutional Declaration Drafting Committee.

In July 2026, he was appointed as a member of the Supreme Constitutional Court by Syrian President Ahmed al-Sharaa. Al-Khalfan took the constitutional oath before al-Sharaa at the People’s Palace and began his duties on 11 July 2026.

== Biography ==
Al-Khalfan was born in 1981 in Azaz, Aleppo Governorate, Syria.

Al-Khalfan belongs to the academic generation specializing in international law. He obtained a doctorate from the French University of Montpellier and served as a member of the teaching staff at the Faculty of Law of the International University of Science and Renaissance in Azaz. Al-Khalfan has lectured at Gaziantep University in Turkey.

Following the fall of the Assad regime, he was appointed to supervise the Deanship of the Faculty of Law at the University of Aleppo before later assuming the position of Dean-designate of the Faculty. He is fluent in French and proficient in English.

He was an opposition figure associated with the Syrian National Coalition, where he managed institutional and electoral affairs. Al-Khalfan had no affiliation with Hay'at Tahrir al-Sham and publicly criticized the group.

== Career ==
Al-Khalfan was a member of the Constitutional Declaration Drafting Committee.

On 7 July 2026, President Ahmed al-Sharaa issued a decree appointing al-Khalfan as a member of the Supreme Constitutional Court, with six additional members also appointed to the court. Al-Khalfan and the members of the court took the constitutional oath before al-Sharaa at the People’s Palace in Damascus on 11 July, and formally assumed their duties.
