= Sūriyā, Yā Dhāt al-Majdi =

English: O Syria, Who Owns the Glory
- سوريا يا ذات المجد
- Emblem of the Arab Kingdom of Syria (1920)
- Former national anthem of Syria
- Lyrics: Mukhtar al-Taneer
- Music: Ahmed Flayfel and Mohammed Flayfel
- Adopted: 1919
- Relinquished: 1938
- Succeeded by: Humat ad-Diyar; La Marseillaise (until 1946)

Audio sample
- Suriyah, Ya Dhat al-Majdi: file; help

"Sūriyā, Yā Dhāt al-Majdi" (Arabic: سوريا يا ذات المجد, lit. 'O Syria, Who Owns the Glory'), was the national anthem of the short-lived Arab Kingdom of Syria. The lyrics were written by poet Mukhtar al-Tanīr, and the music was composed by Ahmed Flayfel and Mohammed Flayfel, who are also known for composing the national anthem of Iraq.

== History ==
The anthem was relinquished as the anthem of Syria in 1938 when another anthem composed by Mohammed Flayfel, Humat ad-Diyar, won the national anthem competition of the First Syrian Republic.

The state the anthem was written for, the Arab Kingdom of Syria, was a short-lived state that spanned much of the Levant, mainly of what is now Jordan and Syria, and existed de jure from 5 October 1918 to 24 July 1920, and de facto from 8 March 1920 to 24 July 1920 until the conquering of Syria by the French. Other usage of the anthem was in the official educational curriculum of Jordan until the 1960s, where it was commonly memorized and sang by students.

== Lyrics ==
Arabic lyrics

𝄆 سوريا يا ذات المجد
والعزة في ماضي العهد 𝄇
إن كنت لنا أسمى مهد
فثراك لنا أسمى لحد
𝄆 سندافع عنك بذا القلب
فبه قد سال دم العرب 𝄇

𝄆 أسقينا ماء قد عذبا
إن كنت لنا أما وأبا 𝄇
من يشرب ماءك لا يأبى
موتا إن كنت له سببا
𝄆 سندافع عنك بذا القلب
فبه قد سال دم العرب 𝄇

𝄆 وسنحيي المجد من الرمس
بأولي عزم وأولي بأس 𝄇
جهلوا ابدا معنى اليأس
ورأوا بالموت هنا النفس
𝄆 سندافع عنك بذا القلب
فبه قد سال دم العرب 𝄇

𝄆 سوريا يا ذات المجد
والعزة في ماضي العهد 𝄇
إن كنت لنا أسمى مهد
فثراك لنا أسمى لحد
𝄆 سندافع عنك بذا القلب
فبه قد سال دم العرب 𝄇

English translation

𝄆 O Syria, who owns the glory
And the pride in the era of the past 𝄇
If you were for us the highest cradle
Your wealth is our highest limit
𝄆 We will defend you with the love of our hearts
For with it spilled the blood of the Arabs 𝄇

𝄆 Give us fresh water
If you were for us a mother and a father 𝄇
Whoever drinks your water never rejects
Death if you were at its cause
𝄆 We will defend you with the love of our hearts
For with it spilled the blood of the Arabs 𝄇

𝄆 And we will revive the glory from the tomb
With who got the willpower and strength 𝄇
They ignored the meaning of despair
And they saw with death the fulfillment of spirit
𝄆 We will defend you with the love of our hearts
For with it spilled the blood of the Arabs 𝄇

𝄆 O Syria, who owns the glory
And the pride in the era of the past 𝄇
If you were for us the highest cradle
Your wealth is our highest limit
𝄆 We will defend you with the love of our hearts
For with it spilled the blood of the Arabs 𝄇

== See also ==
- Arab Kingdom of Syria
- National anthem of Syria
