= National symbols of Syria =

The national symbols of Syria are official and unofficial flags, icons or cultural expressions that are emblematic, representative or otherwise characteristic of Syria and of its culture.

Title	Name of Symbol	Picture/audio
National flag	Flag of Syria	
Coat of arms	Emblem of Syria	
National anthem	Humat ad-Diyar (1938–1958; 1961–2024) (briefly, de jure)	Fī Sabīli al-Majd (2024–present) (briefly, de facto)
National colours	Green, white, black and red (Pan-Arab colors)	
National flower	Arabian Jasmine	
National tree	Olive tree (Olea europaea)	
National bird	Northern bald ibis	
National animal	The Syrian Brown Bear	
National dish	Kibbeh Bil Sanieh	
National instrument	Qanun	
National dance	Dabke	(Dance performed by Palestinian women)
