= Maher Alloush =

Syrian politician (born 1976)

- ماهر علوش

Member of the People's Assembly
- Incumbent
- Assumed office 12 July 2026
- Appointed by: Ahmed al-Sharaa

Personal details
- Born: 1976 (age 49–50) Homs, Syria

Maher Alloush (Arabic: ماهر علوش; born 1976) is a Syrian politician, researcher and writer who has served as member of the People's Assembly since July 2026.

== Career ==
Alloush grew up in Homs. He was arrested by the Assad regime on January 27, 2007, and held at the Sednaya Military Prison; he was released in 2012.

After his release from prison, Alloush participated in peaceful demonstrations and was active within armed factions in organizational, mediation and political work, in addition to his political and intellectual writings.

He was a member of Ahrar al-Sham

After the fall of the Assad regime, the President of the Syrian Arab Republic announced on February 11, 2025, the appointment of Maher Alloush as a member of the Preparatory Committee for the Syrian National Dialogue Conference. A few days after the announcement BBC Monitoring reported that he was seen as a moderate who was discredited by some hardline Islamists.

He became a member of the Syrian People's Assembly as part of the president's list announced on July 1, 2026.
