= Supreme Constitutional Court (Syria) =

Highest legal body for constitutional review in Syria

- المحكمة الدستورية العليا
- Emblem of Syria
- Established: 1973; 53 years ago 2026; 0 years ago (current form)
- Location: Damascus, Syria
- Composition method: Appointment by the President of Syria
- Authorised by: Constitutional Declaration (2025)
- Judge term length: No fixed term
- Number of positions: 7 members, including the court president

President
- Currently: Issam al-Khalif
- Since: 11 July 2026

The Supreme Constitutional Court (Arabic: المحكمة الدستورية العليا, Al-Mahkamah al-Dustūrīyah al-‘Ulyā) is the highest court within the judiciary of Syria. Composed of seven members, the court has the power to exercise constitutional review of laws and regulations and to provide opinions on the constitutionality of draft legislation at the request of the President of Syria. It also provides opinions on the constitutionality of proposed legislation at the request of the Speaker of the People’s Assembly or the President of Syria, and interprets the provisions of the Constitutional Declaration upon request from either authority.

The current members of the Court are Issam al-Khalif, who serves as its president, Khairallah Ghanoum, Muhammad Mustafa Sbeih, Iman Antoine Nouri, Ismail al-Khalfan, Rayan Kahilan, and Aref al-Shaal.

== History ==
=== Ba'athist Syria ===
The Supreme Constitutional Court was established under the Syrian Constitution of 1973 to adjudicate electoral disputes, rule on the constitutionality of a law or decree challenged by the president or People's Council, and to render opinions on the constitutionality of bills, decrees, and regulations when requested to do so by the president; it does not hear appeals. The High Constitutional Court was, however, prohibited from reviewing the validity of laws approved by popular referendum and submitted by the President of the Republic. The court consisted of a president and four judges appointed by the president to serve renewable four-year terms.

The last person to hold the position of President of the Supreme Constitutional Court under Ba'athist Syria was Mohammad Jihad al-Laham, who remained in office until the fall of the Assad regime.

=== Post-Ba'athist Syria ===
Under Article 47 of the Constitutional Declaration of the Syrian Arab Republic, the existing Supreme Constitutional Court 'shall be dissolved, and a new Supreme Constitutional Court shall be established'.

On 7 July 2026, President Ahmed al-Sharaa issued a decree appointing Issam al-Khalif as president of the Supreme Constitutional Court, with six further members being appointed to the court. On 19 July, the court held its inaugural meeting to begin drafting legislation governing its functions and defining its jurisdiction.

== Composition ==
Section 2 of Article 47 of the Constitutional Declaration of the Syrian Arab Republic states that the Supreme Court shall consist of seven members appointed by the President of the Syrian Arab Republic, each possessing integrity, competence, and experience, with its functions and authority regulated by law.

As of 7 July 2026, the current members of the Supreme Constitutional Court are Issam al-Khalif, whom serves as its president, Khairallah Ghanoum, Muhammad Mustafa Sbeih, Iman Antoine Nouri, Ismail al-Khalfan, Rayan Kahilan, and Aref al-Shaal. The members of the court took the constitutional oath before President Ahmed al-Sharaa at the People’s Palace in Damascus on 11 July and formally assumed their duties.

#	Name	Rank	Assumed office	Appointed by
1	Issam al-Khalif	President	11 July 2026	Ahmed al-Sharaa
2	Aref al-Shaal	Member	11 July 2026	Ahmed al-Sharaa
3	Iman Antoine Nour	Member	11 July 2026	Ahmed al-Sharaa
4	Ismail al-Khalfan	Member	11 July 2026	Ahmed al-Sharaa
5	Khairallah Ghanoum	Member	11 July 2026	Ahmed al-Sharaa
6	Muhammad Mustafa Sbeih	Member	11 July 2026	Ahmed al-Sharaa
7	Rayan Kahilan	Member	11 July 2026	Ahmed al-Sharaa

== Duties ==
Under Decree No. 149 issued on 7 July 2026, the Supreme Constitutional Court will 'undertake essential tasks until the law regulating its working mechanism and jurisdiction is issued', such as monitoring the constitutionality of laws and regulations according to the Constitutional Declaration of the Syrian Arab Republic, interpreting the Constitutional Declaration at the request of the president or speaker of the People's Assembly and advising the president regarding the constitutionality of laws drafted by the People's Assembly.

== See also ==
- Judiciary of Syria
- High Judicial Council
- Syrian Constitution
- Syrian Constitution of 1973
