= Fī Sabīli al-Majd =

Temporary national anthem of Syria from 2024

English: In Pursuit of Glory
- فِي سَبِيلِ المَجد
- Temporary national anthem anthem of Syria (de facto)
- Lyrics: Omar Abu Risha
- Music: Ahmed and Mohammed Flayfel

Audio sample
- MIDI instrumental rendition in E-flat major: file; help

"Fī Sabīli al-Majd" (Arabic: في سبيل المجد, lit. 'In Pursuit of Glory') is an Arabic-language patriotic song that is used as an unofficial national anthem of Syria after the fall of the Assad regime, replacing "Ḥumāt ad-Diyār". The lyrics were composed by Syrian poet Omar Abu Risha.

== History ==
Composed by Mohammed Flayfel, this was originally set to be Syria's first national anthem after it won a competition to decide a new anthem for the country. However, "Ḥumāt ad-Diyār", one of the competing anthems that initially lost the competition, was chosen instead in 1938 after it rapidly gained popularity amongst the Syrian public.

Following the fall of the Assad regime in 2024, "Fī Sabīli al-Majd" experienced a resurgence in popularity. In January 2025, the Syrian Football Association formally notified FIFA of its decision to implement a series of changes for the national team's appearances in international matches. Among these changes was the adoption of "Fī Sabīli al-Majd" as a temporary national anthem until a permanent resolution regarding the official anthem could be determined.

In April 2026, "Fī Sabīli al-Majd" was played at the opening ceremony of Al-Fayhaa Sports Hall in Damascus, which was attended by Syrian President Ahmed al-Sharaa, several ministers, and sports and youth figures.

== Lyrics ==
The anthem expresses themes of sacrifice, patriotism, and resistance against oppression.

Arabic script

١
فِي سَبِيلِ الْمَجْدِ وَالْأَوْطَانِ نَحْيَا وَنَبِيدْ
كُلُّنَا ذُو هِمَّةٍ شَمَّاءَ جَبَّارٌ عَنِيدْ
لَا تُطِيقُ السَّادَةُ الْأَحْرَارُ أَطْوَاقَ الْحَدِيدْ
𝄇 إِنَّ عَيْشَ الذُّلِّ وَالْإِرْهَاقِ أَوْلَىٰ بِالْعَبِيدْ 𝄆

لَا نَهَابُ الزَّمَنْ
إِنْ سَقَانَا الْمِحَنْ
فِي سَبِيلِ الْوَطَنْ
كَمْ قَتِيلٍ شَهِيدْ؟

٢
هَـٰذِهِ أَوْطَانُنَا مَثْوَى الْجُدُودِ الْأَوَّلِينْ
وَسَمَاهَا مَهْبِطُ الْإِلْهَامِ وَالْوَحْيِ الْأَمِينْ
وَرُبَاهَا جَنَّةٌ فَتَّانَةٌ لِلنَّاظِرِينْ
𝄇 كُلُّ شِبْرٍ مِنْ ثَرَاهَا دُونَهُ حَبْلُ الْوَرِيدْ 𝄆

لَا نَهَابُ الزَّمَنْ
إِنْ سَقَانَا الْمِحَنْ
فِي سَبِيلِ الْوَطَنْ
كَمْ قَتِيلٍ شَهِيدْ؟

٣
قَدْ صَبَرْنَا فَإِذَا بِالصَّبْرِ لَا يُجْدِي هُدَىٰ
وَحَلُمْنَا فَإِذَا بِالْحُلمِ يُودِي لِلرَّدَىٰ
ونَهَضْنَا الْيَوْمَ كَالْأَطْوَادِ فِي وَجْهِ الْعِدَىٰ
𝄇 نَدْفَعُ الضَّيْمَ وَنَبْنِي لِلْعُلَىٰ صَرْحاً مَجِيدْ 𝄆

لَا نَهَابُ الزَّمَنْ
إِنْ سَقَانَا الْمِحَنْ
فِي سَبِيلِ الْوَطَنْ
كَمْ قَتِيلٍ شَهِيدْ؟

Romanization of Arabic

I
Fī sabīli al-majdi wa-l-awṭāni naḥyā wa-nabīd
Kullunā ḏū himmatin šamāʾ jabārun ʿanīd
Lā tuṭīqu as-sādatu al-aḥrār aṭwāqa al-ḥadīd
𝄆 Inna ʿayša aḏ-ḏulli wa-l-irhāqi awlā bi-l-ʿabīd 𝄇

Lā nahābu az-zaman
In saqānā al-miḥan
Fī sabīl al-waṭan
Kam qutīlin shahīd

II
Hāḏihi awṭānunā maṯwā al-judūdi al-awwalīn
Wa-samāhā mahbiṭu al-ilhām wa-l-waḥyi al-amīn
Wa-rubāhā jannatun fātinatun li-n-nāẓirīn
𝄆 Kullu šibrin min ṯarāhā dūnahu ḥablu al-warīd 𝄇

Lā nahābu az-zaman
In saqānā al-miḥan
Fī sabīl al-waṭan
Kam qutīlin šahīd

III
Qad ṣabarnā fa-idhā biṣ-ṣabri lā yujdī hudā
Wa-ḥalumnā fa-idhā bi-l-ḥulmi yūdī li-r-radā
Wa-nahaḍnā al-yawma ka-l-aṭwādi fī wajhi al-ʿidā
𝄆 Nadfaʿu aḍ-ḍayma wa-nabnī li-l-ʿulā ṣarḥan majīd 𝄇

Lā nahābu az-zaman
In saqānā al-miḥan
Fī sabīl al-waṭan
Kam qutīlin šahīd

English translation

1
In pursuit of glory and the homeland, we live and perish
We are all of lofty determination, mighty and resolute
The free masters cannot bear the chains of iron
𝄆 For a life of humiliation and exhaustion befits only slaves 𝄇

We do not fear time, if it brings us trials
For the sake of the homeland, how many martyrs have fallen?

2
This is our homeland, the resting place of the ancient forefathers
Its sky is the cradle of inspiration and true revelation
Its hills are an enchanting paradise for all who gaze
𝄆 Every span of its soil is as precious as the lifeline of our veins 𝄇

We do not fear time, if it brings us trials
For the sake of the homeland, how many martyrs have fallen?

3
We have endured, but patience no longer leads to guidance
We have dreamed, but dreams only lead to ruin
So today, we rise like mountains before our foes
𝄆 We repel oppression and build a glorious monument of honor 𝄇

We do not fear time, if it brings us trials
For the sake of the homeland, how many martyrs have fallen?

== See also ==
- National symbols of Syria
- "Wallāh Zamān, Yā Silāḥī" – Anthem of the United Arab Republic
