= Maurice Nseiri =

Syrian craftsman and metalworker (born 1945)

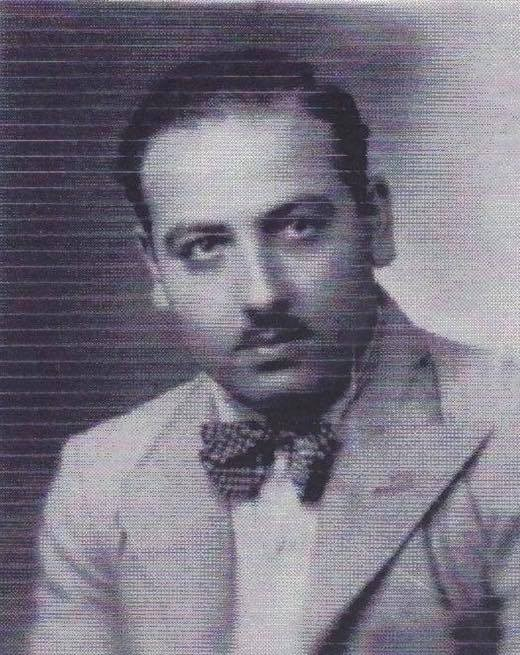
- Nseiri c. 1960
- Born: 1945 (age 80); Syria
- Known for: Contributing to the construction of the Syrian presidential palace

Maurice Nseiri (Arabic: موريس نصيري, romanized: Muris Nuʿsayri) (born 1945) is a Syrian craftsman.

== Early life ==
Nseiri was born in Syria in 1945. He is a Syrian Jew.

== Biography ==
Nseiri studied the art under the tutelage of his father, Sion Nseiri. In 1965, he took over his father's workshop in the Umayyad bazaar. When the Israeli spy Eli Cohen was uncovered and arrested by Syrian security officials in January of that year, a receipt from the Nseiri shop was found in Cohen's possession. The Mukhabarat swept into the Nseiri workshop and arrested Maurice’s father, brother, and all employees.

In 1970, Nseiri closed his workshop and attempted to flee to Israel via Lebanon but was arrested at the border. Following the Jewish exodus from Syria in the early 1990s, Nseiri emigrated to Canada.

His works can still be found across Damascus at synagogues and churches, the Sheraton Damascus Hotel as well as at the Syrian Presidential Palace where he created the front brass gates, lamps and other items.
