= Hassan Daghim =

Syrian politician

Hassan Ibrahim Daghim
- حسن إبراهيم دغيم

Member of the People's Assembly
- Incumbent
- Assumed office 1 July 2026
- Appointed by: Ahmed al-Sharaa

Personal details
- Born: 1976 (age 49–50) Idlib, Syria

Hassan Ibrahim Daghim (Arabic: حسن إبراهيم دغيم; born 1976) is a Syrian politician and Islamic scholar who has served as a member of the People's Assembly since July 2026.

== Early life and career ==
Born in the town of Jarjanaz in Idlib Governorate in 1976. He earned a bachelor's degree from the Faculty of Sharia at Damascus University in 2000, as well as a diploma in comparative jurisprudence in 2007. He worked as a preacher and teacher of Islamic education at several schools in the countryside of Aleppo and Idlib.

After the Syrian revolution began in 2011, Daghim became active in coordinating revolutionary efforts. He served as an advisor in the Criminal Chamber of the Court of Appeals affiliated with the "Islamic Authority for the Administration of Liberated Areas in Idlib," which was founded on 1 March 2013, and became a member of the Syrian Islamic Council.

He was active in mediating disputes between military factions, arbitrating the conflict between the Suqour al-Sham Brigades and other factions on 17 May 2014, and establishing a guidance body dedicated to providing guidance and raising awareness within the ranks of the Free Syrian Army. and served as director of the Moral Guidance Department of the Syrian National Army since its establishment on 30 December 2017.

After the fall of the Assad regime, the President of the Syrian Arab Republic announced on 11 February 2025, the appointment of Hassan Daghim as a member of the Preparatory Committee for the Syrian National Dialogue Conference.

He became a member of the Syrian People's Assembly as part of the presidential list announced on 1 July 2026.
