= Judiciary of Syria =

The judicial system of Syria is a synthesis of Ottoman, French, and Islamic laws. The civil, commercial and criminal codes are primarily based on the French legal practices. Promulgated in 1949, those laws have special provisions sanctioned to limit application of customary law among beduin and religious minorities. The Islamic religious courts continue to function in some parts of the country, but their jurisdiction is limited to issues of personal status, such as marriage, divorce, paternity, custody of children, and inheritance. Nonetheless, in 1955 a personal code pertaining to many aspects of personal status was developed. This law modified and modernized sharia by improving the status of women and clarifying the laws of inheritance.

== Supreme Judicial Council ==
The appointment, transfer and dismissal of judges is handled by the High Judicial Council. The council is composed of senior civil judges and chaired by the president of Syria. The independence of the judiciary is guaranteed by president in his role as chairman of the High Judicial Council, according to Article 131 of the constitution. Article 133 stipulates that judges be autonomous and subject to no authority other than the law. However, with the adoption of the Constitutional Declaration, Article 43 states that the judiciary is independent, and judges are subject only to the law, while the Supreme Judicial Council ensures the proper functioning of the judiciary and upholds its independence.

== Court system ==
The Syrian judicial system is composed of the civil and criminal courts, military courts, security courts, and religious courts, which adjudicate matters of personal status such as divorce and inheritance.

=== Court of Cassation ===
The Court of Cassation, sitting in Damascus, is the highest court of appeals, responsible for resolving judicial issues. Below the Court of Cassation are the courts of appeal, and at the lowest level are the courts of first instance, designated variously as magistrate courts, summary courts, and peace courts. Also at the basic level were juvenile and other special courts alongside an administrative tribunal known as the Council of State.

=== Supreme Constitutional Court ===
The Supreme Constitutional Court was established under the 1973 Constitution to adjudicate electoral disputes, rule on the constitutionality of a law or decree challenged by the president or People's Council, and to render opinions on the constitutionality of bills, decrees, and regulations when requested to do so by the president; it does not hear appeals.

The High Constitutional Court is forbidden, however, to question the validity of the popularly approved "laws submitted by the President of the Republic to popular referendums". The court consists of the president of Syria and seven judges he appoints to serve a renewable term of four years, with one being appointed as the president of the Supreme Constitutional Court.

=== Civil and criminal courts ===
Civil and criminal courts are organized under the Ministry of Justice. Defendants before these courts are entitled to the legal representation of their choice; the courts appoint lawyers for indigents. Defendants are presumed innocent; they are allowed to present evidence and to confront their accusers. Trials are public, except for those involving juveniles or sex offenses. Defendants may appeal their verdicts to a provincial appeals court and ultimately to the Court of Cassation. Such appeals are difficult to win because the courts do not provide verbatim transcripts of cases—only summaries prepared by the presiding judges. There are no juries.

=== Military courts ===
Military courts have the authority to try civilians as well as military personnel. The venue for a civilian defendant is decided by a military prosecutor. There were continuing reports that the Government operates military field courts in locations outside established courtrooms. Such courts reportedly observe fewer of the formal procedures of regular military courts.

=== Security courts ===
The two security courts are the Supreme State Security Court (SSSC), which tries political and national security cases, and the Economic Security Court (ESC), which tries cases involving financial crimes. Both courts operate under the state of emergency, not ordinary law, and do not observe constitutional provisions safeguarding defendants' rights. The SSSC was abolished by President Bashar al-Assad by legislative decree No. 53 on 21 April 2011 and was replaced by the Counter-Terrorism Court. On 16 September 2026, the Parliament of Syria under the caretaker government voted to abolish the Counter-Terrorism Court and nullify its rulings.

== See also ==
- Syria Justice and Accountability Centre
- Constitution of Syria
