= Huda Atassi =

Syrian politician (born 1968)

Huda abdul-Basit Atassi
- هدى عبد الباسط اتاسي

Member of the People's Assembly
- Incumbent
- Assumed office 1 July 2026
- Appointed by: Ahmed al-Sharaa

Personal details
- Born: 1968 (age 57–58) Homs, Syria

Huda abdul-Basit Atassi (Arabic: هدى عبد الباسط اتاسي; born 1968) is a Syrian politician and humanitarian worker who has served as member of the People's Assembly since July 2026.

Atassi grew up in Homs and studied architecture. In 2013, Atassi joined International Humanitarian Relief. In 2016, she was honoured by CARE International, and on 12 February 2025, she was appointed to the preparatory committee for the Syrian National Dialogue Conference.
