= Syria al-Shaab =

Syria al-Shaab (Arabic: سوريا الشعب) was a rebel supporting channel in Syria that broadcast via satellite and the Internet. The station, whose name means "Syria of the people," was founded by Mohammad Al Ajlouni in July 2011.

The channel describes itself as a moderate, nationalist channel that seeks to reach all Syrians regardless of their identity and that aims to contribute to the building of a democratic future for Syria.

== Censorship ==
The channel has reported attempts by the Syrian government to jam its satellite broadcasts and to hack into its Skype account.

== Funding ==
The channel has not revealed the sources of its funding.
