= Timeline of the Syrian civil war (January–July 2014) =

The following is a timeline of the Syrian Civil War from January to July 2014. Information about aggregated casualty counts is found at Casualties of the Syrian Civil War.

== January 2014 ==
=== 7 January ===
It was confirmed that 34 foreign ISIL and Jund al-Aqsa fighters had been executed in the previous few days by rebels in the Jabal al-Zawiya area. ISIL retreated from Mayadin in Deir ez-Zor Governorate, without any fighting with rebel forces. East of Rastan, in the Homs Governorate, ISIL attacked a rebel headquarters, killing 15 rebel fighters. During the day, it was revealed that during the previous evening, ISIL executed up to 50 prisoners in the Qadi al-Askar district of Aleppo. The dead included media activists, relief workers, and other civilians. According to the opposition SOHR, 42 people were executed, including, 21 rebel fighters and five media activists.

=== 8 January ===
Rebels captured the ISIL headquarters in Aleppo city at the Children's hospital in the Qadi Askar district. ISIL forces lost control over opposition-held areas of the city and retreated to Al-Inzarat on the northeastern outskirts of Aleppo. 300 hostages held by the radical jihadists were set free. In Ar-Raqqah, the hospital was abandoned, bodies were lying in the central square and there was no power or water leaving the city "completely paralyzed", according to an opposition activist. At this point, ISIL controlled two key routes out of Raqqa: to the east toward the Iraqi border and also the road north to the Turkish frontier. The head of the al-Nusra Front, Abu Mohammad al-Golani, confirmed that fighting had taken place between his organization and ISIL and called for mediation and an end to the "infighting." Late in the day, ISIL started a counterattack, as it launched car bomb assaults targeting opposition checkpoints. Three attacks took place in Al-Bab, Hreitan, and Jarabulus in the Aleppo Governorate, Observatory director Rami Abdel Rahman told AFP. He said similar overnight attacks took place in the Aleppo Governorate, while one occurred in Mayadin in the eastern Deir ez-Zor Governorate. The attack in Al-Bab killed nine people.

=== 9 January ===
A car bomb killed 18 people, including women and children, in central Hama province, according to the Syrian Observatory for Human Rights organization. The New York Times reported that Islamic extremist groups in Syria with ties to al-Qaeda try to identify, recruit and train Americans and other Westerners who had traveled there to get them to carry out attacks when they return home.

=== 10 January ===
ISIL managed to push back rebel forces on the eastern approaches to Ar-Raqqah. ISIL forces also killed 20 rebel fighters in fighting in the town of Al-Bab in Aleppo province, and managed to capture wheat silos and mills just outside the town. ISIL commander Abu Omar al-Shishani entered the town with a convoy of 30 vehicles and troops after he lifted the ISIL's siege of Deir-az-Zor airport.

=== 11 January ===
Rebels moved a convoy including tanks and technicals to Saraqeb in preparation to push ISIL out. Heavy fighting erupted and it was reported that rebels took over most of the town, and besieged hundreds of ISIL fighters. Earlier in the day, five rebels were killed on the outskirts of Saraqeb when their car hit a bomb. Meanwhile, ISIL forces managed to capture the border town of Tal Abyad, while in Ar-Raqqah ISIL fighters captured a rebel checkpoint and the train station. ISIL fighters also dumped the corpses of dozens of their foes at the village of Jazra, to the west of Ar-Raqqah. Dozens of bodies of ISIL fighters were also reportedly in Ar-Raqqah's hospital. Rebels managed to regain territory lost in previous days in Aleppo province and were defending against ISIL counterattacks. 20 rebels were killed in fighting in the town of Anadan, while 30 rebels were killed in three days of fighting in the village of al-Tiba, northeast of Sekhna.

=== 12 January ===
It was confirmed that rebel forces had captured the eastern part of Saraqeb with the local ISIL commander surrounded with his fighters in the center of the town. Fighting was still continuing in Ar-Raqqah between ISIL and remnants of rebel units, including the Al-Nusra Front, although by this point ISIL had captured much of the city. According to an opposition activist, 95 percent of Ar-Raqqah and its countryside were under ISIL control. ISIL forces had also captured the towns of Hrietan and Basraton in Aleppo province. It was also reported that the bodies of 70 rebels were delivered to Ar-Raqqah's hospital after they were executed by ISIL following their capture of Tal Abyad. Another report put the number of executed prisoners at 100. Syrian State TV claimed that a rebel mortar attack killed 19 people in the government-controlled Ghouta and Karm al shami areas of the city of Homs.

=== 13 January ===
It was reported that ISIL had won the battle of Raqqa, capturing most of the province and the provincial capital. ISIL had also captured Al-Bab and Beza'a, while the rebels were gaining ground in Jarabulus near the Turkish border. Another mass execution of prisoners was also reported near the village of Qantari, about 80 kilometers north of Raqqa, when ISIL killed 46 captured fighters of the Ahrar ash-Sham rebel group. 14 rebels were also executed in Homs province

=== 14 January ===
It was reported that rebels captured the villages of Masqan, Kafar Kalbin and Kafra in Aleppo province, while ISIL took full control of Raqqah city after the last remaining rebels retreated. Meanwhile, the rebels also captured the prison in Jarablus, releasing 70 prisoners from ISIL custody. 46 Palestinians and Syrian residents in the Yarmouk Camp died of starvation and lack of medical care since October, from a Syrian Army enforced blockade.

=== 15 January ===
An ISIL car bomb in Jarablus killed 26 people, of which 23 were rebel fighters and three were civilians. Meanwhile, in Saraqeb fighting was continuing and opposition sources reported that the local ISIL commander, a Belgian, was killed. ISIL denied the claim. Between 15 and 17 January, rebels captured Jibreen, Hardntin Kfarrakeshr, Sheikh Ali, Aajel, 46th base, Orum al-Sughra and Reef al-Muhandiseen, while ISIL retreated from the village of Kafarjoum, which held what was believed to be the largest ISIL arms depot in all of Syria. ISIL also withdrew from Saraqib, burning their vehicles as they retreated, while at the same time ISIL recaptured Jarabulus.

=== 16 January ===
A suicide bomber killed 4 people and injured 26 in the Lebanese town of Hermel, a Hezbollah stronghold near the Syrian border.

=== 17 January ===
A rocket fired from Syria into the Lebanese border town of Arsal killed seven people and wounded 15.

=== 20 January ===
2 suicide car bombs exploded at the Bab Al-Hawa border crossing, killing 16 people including six rebels. The same day, ISIL forces seized control of the Al-Jarah military airport. In Manbij, a large suicide car explosion killed 20 people, including rebels, women and children By 23 January, ISIL was in full control of Manbij and completely secured Darkush the following day.

=== 27 January ===
It was reported that ISIL senior Commander Sameer Abid Mohammed al-Halefawi (a.k.a. Haji Bakr) was killed by rebels in Tal Rifaat, near Azaz, and at least two other ISIL senior commanders were captured at Hreitan. Four ISIL fighters and three rebels were killed in the fighting. ISIL confirmed the death of top ISIL leader Haji Bakr on 2 February.

== February 2014 ==
- Al-Qaeda's general command broke off its links with ISIL, reportedly to concentrate the Islamist effort on unseating President Bashar al-Assad.
- By mid-February, al-Nusra Front had joined the battle in support of rebel forces, and expelled ISIL forces from the Deir ez-Zor province in Syria.

=== 7 February ===
A three-day truce was agreed; civilians were allowed to evacuate from a rebel-held area of the Syrian city of Homs after more than 18 months under a government blockade.

=== 12 February ===
- The BBC reported more than 1,000 civilians evacuated Homs during the truce, which had been extended to this day.
- Russia said it would veto a U.N. resolution on humanitarian aid access in Syria, claiming that the draft was an effort to prepare for military strikes against President Bashar al-Assad's government.

== March 2014 ==
=== 4 March ===
ISIL retreated from the border town of Azaz and nearby villages, choosing instead to consolidate around Raqqa in anticipation of an escalation of fighting with al-Nusra.

=== 18 March ===
The United States expelled all Syrian diplomats and closed the Syrian embassy in Washington D.C.

=== 19 March ===
The Israeli Air Force launched several air strikes on Syrian military sites, killing one Syrian soldier and wounding 7 others, in retaliation for a bombing that wounded four of its troops in the Golan Heights.

=== 21 March ===
Clashes erupt in Tripoli, Lebanon between Syrian government supporters and detractors, leaving 3 dead.

=== 23 March ===
Turkish F-16s shot down a Syrian MiG-23 aircraft for purportedly violating Turkish airspace.

=== 27 March ===
The Syrian Army shelled the YPG-held neighbourhood of al-Msheirfah in Al-Hasakah city. The Syrian Kurdish news agency ANHA, citing a YPG source, stated that the attack began at 11:30 AM, and that mortar shells fired by the army struck the YPG's "Martyr Shiyar" office and a cotton mill, causing material damage. This incident occurred while the YPG was fighting off an ISIS attack against the town of Jaz'ah near Ya'rubiyah.

=== 31 March ===
Members of the pro-government National Defence Force shot a YPG fighter in Qamishli city. The YPG responded by launching an operation in the Qadour Bek district of Qamishli, killing seven pro-government fighters and detaining 10 others. It was also reported that the YPG captured parts of the Qadour Bek district, including the Customs Building and the Qamishli's Bread Factory.

== April 2014 ==
=== 11 April ===
Chemical weapons are used again in Syria, this time on the town of Kafr Zita, Hama.

=== 27 April ===
Iraqi helicopters reportedly destroyed an ISIL convoy in Syria. This was possibly the first time that Iraqi forces struck outside their country since the Gulf War.

== May 2014 ==
=== 7 May ===
Rebels withdraw from the besieged city of Homs in accordance with the U.N.-brokered deal between them and the Syrian government.

=== 23 May ===
Russia and China veto a U.N. Security Council resolution that would have asked the International Criminal Court to investigate war crimes in Syria.

=== 25 May ===
- Syrian rebels completely secure Khan Shaykhun and its surroundings in the 2014 Idlib offensive, capturing the al-Salam checkpoint west of the town.

=== 26 May ===
- The Jordanian Foreign Ministry deemed Syrian ambassador in Amman Bahjat Suleiman persona non grata, giving him 24 hours to leave the kingdom. It said he had violated diplomatic protocol by posting repeated comments on social media that criticized Jordan and its Gulf allies. Syria declared Jordan’s charge d’affaires in Damascus persona non grata in response.

== June 2014 ==
=== 3 June ===
Syria presidential election takes place in government-controlled areas, amidst an opposition boycott. While the West denounces the election as rigged and "meaningless", delegations from Assad's main supporters, including Russia, Iran and Venezuela, praise the election as transparent and free.

=== 4 June ===
The Syrian government announces Assad was re-elected, claiming that Assad had won with 88.7% of the vote and a turnout of 73.47% of eligible voters.

=== 9 June ===
The Syrian government declares a general amnesty for all citizens; Assad would later fail to follow through and release any political prisoners.

=== 18 June ===
The OPCW releases a preliminary report indicating more chemical weapons have been used since the August 2013 attacks, confirming France's suspicions that the Syrian government has still been using chlorine gas attacks.

=== 23 June ===
The final stockpile of "declared" chemical weapons is shipped out of the country.

=== 25 June ===
The Syrian Air Force bombs Islamic State in Iraq and the Levant-held towns in Iraq, killing at least 57 civilians.

== July 2014 ==
=== July 16 ===
Bashar Assad is sworn in to serve his third seven-year term as President of Syria.

=== 17 July ===
- Syria's Shaer gas field in Homs Governorate was seized by ISIL. According to the Syrian Observatory for Human Rights (SOHR), at least 90 National Defence Force guards defending the field were killed, as were 21 ISIL fighters. The SOHR later put the death toll from the fighting and the killing of prisoners at 270 soldiers, militiamen and staff, and at least 40 ISIL fighters.

=== 25 July ===
- ISIL captures a Syrian 17th Division base near Raqqa and beheads several captured soldiers, whose heads are displayed in Raqqa. 32 jihadists and 42 Syrian Army members were overall killed on this day in clashes between ISIL and Syrian Army in Hasakeh, Raqqa and Aleppo provinces.
