= Mohammed Flayfel =

Lebanese composer of the Iraqi and Syrian anthems (1899–1986)

- Born: Mohammed Salim Flayfel; 1899; Beirut, Ottoman Empire
- Origin: Lebanese
- Died: 1986 (aged 86–87)
- Genres: Arabic music
- Occupations: Composer, musician

Mohammed Flayfel (1899–1986; Arabic: محمد فليفل) was a Lebanese composer and musician.

Born in 1899 in the Ashrafiyeh neighborhood of Beirut, some of his notable compositions include "Mawtini" (the national anthem of Iraq and former national anthem of Palestine until 1996) and Suriyah, Ya Dhat al-Majdi (the anthem of the short-lived Arab Kingdom of Syria). His "Humat ad-Diyar" was selected in a 1938 competition as the national anthem of Syria. He also worked on several other patriotic songs, occasionally in collaboration with his brother, Ahmad Salim Flayfel.

Mohammed Flayfel is also credited for discovering the talents of a young Fairuz when she participated in a radio talent show and he advised her to enroll in the Lebanese Conservatory.

He died in 1986.
