= Bassel Shehadeh =

Syrian film director (1984–2012)

Bassel Shehadeh (Arabic: باسل شحادة; January 31, 1984 – May 28, 2012) was a Syrian film maker, producer, IT Engineer, environmental and cultural activist, and a well-known civil activist during the Syrian uprising in 2011 to 2012. He was a pioneer in organising peaceful protests in Damascus denouncing the government’s crackdown of the Arab Spring. Shehadeh was arrested while protesting with fellow artists in the al-Midan neighbourhood of Damascus. His camera captured and documented the assaults and bombardments conducted by the Syrian regime's forces on the city of Homs. He was killed during a government assault in the neighbourhood of al-Safsafa in Homs.

== Early life ==
Shehadeh was born in Damascus on January 31, 1984, to a family of intellectuals of Christian faith. His mother was an engineer and his father was a professor of mechanical engineering at the University of Damascus. He had one brother, Alaa, and one sister, Maria, the former being a medical student at Damascus University, while the latter works for a news channel in Dubai.

=== Education ===
After graduating high school, Shehadeh enrolled at the school of Information Technology at the University of Damascus in 2001. He graduated with a degree in Information Technology in 2006, majoring in Artificial Intelligence. Shehadeh then took a break from his field to study Archaeology and work with the United Nations at one of their offices in Damascus.

=== Interest in film production and travel to USA ===
Shehadeh developed a passion for filming, photography, and music. He managed to produce several short movies including:

- Saturday Morning Gift: a short documentary reflecting the suffering that children experienced in the 2006 Lebanon War.
- Carrying Eid to Camps: a short documentary about a charitable project that Shehadeh participated in to bring the joy of Eid to children affected by the Syrian drought living in relief camps near Damascus.
- Brakes: A documentary that was awarded the "TAMKEEN" grant for the best Syrian Documentary in the DOX BOX 2011 Film festival.

In 2011, Shehadeh received a Fulbright scholarship to pursue a master's degree in Film production at Syracuse University. He left after being released from jail for participating in a protest at the al-Midan neighborhood in Damascus. Shehadeh was enrolled at Syracuse for the fall semester of 2011. He travelled extensively while in the United States, filming and photographing the events of Occupy Wall Street, while also conducting interviews with several American intellectuals. “Singing to Freedom” produced by Shehadeh in 2011, featured interviews of many prominent intellectuals, including Noam Chomsky, on their views of peaceful resistance against dictatorial governments. Upon finishing the fall semester at Syracuse, Shehadeh made the decision to sacrifice his scholarship and returned to his peaceful activism in Syria.

=== The voyager ===
On March 17, 2011, just as the Arab Spring began to reach Syria, "I was gambling with my life everyday, but death did not get me.” He drove through Iraq, Iran, Afghanistan, Pakistan, and also Turkey to get to his destination. After running out of gas during one stage of his trip, Shehadeh bartered with gas station owners for a litre of gasoline every morning in order to keep on his journey. He was the first Syrian to cross the Iran-Pakistan border and was subsequently ‘escorted’ by Pakistani police as he made his way through the western part of the country. He returned to Damascus in May 2011.

== Activism during the Syrian uprising ==
During the Egyptian revolution of 2011, Shehadeh called for a sit-in in front of the Egyptian embassy in Damascus to rally against the crackdown of Mubarak's regime on Egyptian protesters. The Syrian security forces dispersed the sit-in with force. During the Syrian uprising in March 2011, Shehadeh participated in many activities involving peaceful resistance. He joined the protest of intellectuals in Damascus and was arrested on July 13, 2011. He was subsequently beaten by security officers and endured hardships through his incarceration aggravated by his own diabetes.

Shehadeh's imprisonment did not deter his perseverance. He pioneered the project of ‘freedom money’ in Damascus, and filmed many peaceful protests and security forces attacking them. Shehadeh volunteered to work as a reporter and witness to a number of media channels after he came back from the US. He settled in Homs in March 2012 amid the intensified military operations conducted by the Syrian government in that city. He remained there almost 3 months until his death. There, he managed to film the government's bombardments as well as train many activists and photographers in Homs on how to perform proper montage and video editing. Shehadeh started producing a short movie in Homs titled I Will Cross Tomorrow in order to document the eminent danger which the residents of Homs find themselves in. Shehadeh also trained the producer Ahmad Al-Assam (also known as Ahmad Abu Ibrahim) who filmed many videos and produced many news reports on Syria.

== Death ==
On May 28, 2012, Shehadeh was fired upon and killed along with a group of activists, including Ahmad al-Assam, by the government's forces in the neighbourhood of al-Safsafa in Bab al-Sebaa, Homs. Shehadeh was buried in Homs according to his will. The government's forces prevented his friends from going to the church in Damascus to offer prayers to him and even imposed a siege on his house. Syracuse University released a statement condemning his death and conveying condolences to his family and friends. Noam Chomsky commented on his death by saying: "Terrible news! I’d already heard. A wonderful courageous person. What will happen to poor Syria as it sinks more deeply into the abyss – I hate to think."
