= Timeline of the Syrian civil war (August–December 2014) =

The following is a timeline of the Syrian civil war from August to December 2014. Information about aggregated casualty counts is found at Casualties of the Syrian Civil War.

== August 2014 ==
=== 4 August ===
The Lebanese Army stated that 14 soldiers had been killed and 22 were missing after alleged clashes with Islamic State of Iraq and the Levant fighters on the Syrian border.

=== 7 August ===
Rebel militants withdrew from the Lebanese town of Arsal after a ceasefire with the Lebanese army.

=== 8 August ===
ISIS forces captured two towns – Akhtarin and Turkmanbareh – and several villages north of Aleppo, after battles with other rebel groups.

=== 18 August ===
By mid-August 2014, ISIL was the most successful group in Syria, controlling the main areas of Syrian oil and gas fields.

=== 19 August ===
The Islamic State of Iraq and Syria posts a video of their beheading of American journalist James Wright Foley, who had been kidnapped in 2012.

=== 21 August ===
The Syrian opposition accused the Syrian army of launching a chemical attack on the Jobar neighborhood of Damascus, killing at least six civilians.

=== 22 August ===
The United Nations estimated that the death toll in Syria had doubled to at least 191,000 in the past year.

=== 24 August ===
ISIS forces captured the Tabqa airbase from the Syrian military.

=== 26 August ===
Al-Qaeda affiliate Al-Nusra Front retook the Syria border crossing with Israel-occupied Golan at Quneitra, with shells dropping across the border. An IDF officer was wounded and Israel shelled two Syrian bases.

Syrian airstrikes reportedly hit an area near the embattled Beqaa town of Arsal.

=== 27 August ===
The UN Human Rights Council issued a report accusing both IS militants and Syrian government forces of committing war crimes in Syria.

An artillery shell fired from the Syrian Army from Qunetira injured an Israeli army officer. Rebel forces captured the Syrian side of the Quneitra Israel-Syria border pass after heavy fighting.

=== 28 August ===
An unidentified rebel group captured 43 Fijian peacekeepers on the Golan Heights.

Syrian rebels captured the Syrian-Israeli border crossing.

Syrian fighter jets launched a precise attack on an IS HQ in the city of Mohasan, during a meeting between military leaders and sharia judges. The attack resulted in the death of most leaders inside, while others were wounded. Another airstrike occurred against an IS camp near Mansoura Dam, killing and wounding dozens of insurgents. According to SOHR, ISIS executed 160 Syrian soldiers between 27 and 28 August.

=== 29 August ===
The United Nations estimated that three million Syrians live as refugees overseas while another 6.5 million are displaced within Syria, and stated that "almost half of all Syrians have now been forced to abandon their homes and flee for their lives".

== September 2014 ==
=== 1-6 September ===
The Syrian Army began shelling al-Nusra Front positions in the Qunetira border post. On 2 September, ISIL revealed that it had killed Steven Sotloff. On 3 September, the Syrian Army killed Malek al Tal, a senior al-Nusra commander in the Qalamoun region in Syria. He was responsible for the kidnapping of several Christian nuns in Syria earlier in the year.

Also, ISIS launched an attempt to capture the Deir ez-Zor military airport, but the attempt was repelled while the army launched airstrikes on ISIS positions. ISIS lost at least 47 fighters. On 5 September the Syrian Air Force killed 18 IS fighters during airstrikes on the city of Raqqa.

The ISIL killed a Lebanese soldier in the town of Arsal. Also, the Syrian Air Force carried out several airstrikes in Raqqa targeting an Islamic court and a training camp. The Syrian Air Force also targeted a bakery, killing dozens of civilians.

=== 9 September ===
Syrian Army units retreated from the Khan al Hallabat area, after rebels advanced there. At the same time, rebels captured Tell al-Mal, which connects the Quneitra and Daraa provinces. Rebels also captured Al-Mal, al-Taiha, Aqraba, and the border village of Kafar Nasig east of the hill. At this point, according to the SOHR, rebels controlled about 70% of the Quneitra Governorate.

=== 10 September ===
In a televised address to the nation, The President of the United States Barack Obama outlined a broad campaign against ISIL. For Syria, the strategy involves airstrikes against ISIL coupled with arming and training Syrian rebels.

=== 12 September ===
The Syrian Army re-took control of the town of Halfaya in the Hama Province, after expelling al-Nusra fighters from the town.

=== 14 September ===
David Haines was killed by ISIL. Also, the Free Syrian Army announced that they would not be joining the coalition to fight IS without a guarantee that the US is committed to the Syrian Arab Army overthrow.

=== 15 September ===
Syrian Arab Army and Syrian Special Forces destroyed a bridge over the Euphrates river used by ISIL. A number of IS fighters were killed during the operation.

=== 18 September ===
IS fighters seized around 21 villages in Northern Syria from Kurdish fighters. The villages were located near Ayn-Al-Arab (Kobani).

=== 22 September ===
Bombing raids by an American-led International Coalition (Bahrain, Jordan, Saudi Arabia, Qatar, and the United Arab Emirates) targeted ISIS and Al Qaeda's Khorasan franchise, escalating the war to a new level. The airstrikes in Aleppo on the Khorasan group killed at least 50 militants, who were mostly not Syrian, and also a few women and children.

By 22 September, ISIL had taken around 100 villages from Kurdish fighters in Kobani and they were besieging the city of Kobani.

=== 23 September ===
The al-Nusra Front claimed that its leader Abu Yousef al-Turki was killed the air strikes.

Israel shot down a Syrian Air Force Sukhoi Su-24 that had allegedly infiltrated its air space.

=== 24 September ===
Coalition aircraft began targeting oil installations controlled by the ISIL, mostly located in Al Hasakah, Abu Kamail, and Deir el-Zour.

=== 25 September ===
More than 20 Syrian rebel groups signed an agreement to unite in the fight against the Islamic State of Iraq and Syria and President Bashar al-Assad's forces.

The Syrian army retook control of the village of Adra, located near Damascus. In Deir-Ezzur, the Syrian republican guard killed over 80 ISIL fighters in the Al-Haweeqa area. IS was also withdrawing from the Tabqa airbase in Raqqa after being hit by several airstrikes from coalition jets as well as the Syrian air force.

=== 26–27 September ===
ISIL resumed its siege of Kobani with a full-scale assault from the west, east and south of the city. US-led coalition air strikes targeting ISIL fighters besieging Kobani were reported on 27 September 2014. An ISIL building and two "armed vehicles" were destroyed at the Kobani border crossing, according to the Pentagon.

=== 29 September ===
With more errant shells landing on Turkish territory, the Parliament in Ankara begins debating a possible invasion, while the Army begins massing ordinance on the border with Syria.

=== 30 September ===
Following American airstrikes, Kurdish Peshmerga take a vital border crossing at Rabia. ISIS suffers damaged equipment and delayed advances due to American air superiority, buying the Kurds in northern part of Syria time to recover.

== October 2014 ==
=== 1 October ===
At least 45 people (including 41 children) are killed and 56 injured by a suicide bomber attack on the Akrameh al-Makhzumi elementary school in Homs.

=== 3 October ===
The Syrian army started an offensive on areas north of Aleppo. According to the Syrian state news agency, the Syrian army captured a few villages north of Aleppo, including the city of Handarat. It was later reported that rebel forces recaptured Handaraat.

=== 4 October ===
The Kurdish city of Kobane in the Raqqa governate is on the brink of catastrophe as ISIS fighters besiege the city.

=== 5 October ===
18,000 Palestinians are facing life-threatening shortages of water in the Yarmouk Camp neighborhood of Damascus.

=== 6 October ===
ISIL fighters advanced in the Kurdish town of Kobani with heavy fighting inside the city. It is unclear if some parts of the city are captured, but ISIS fighters planted their flags on some buildings inside the city.

=== 7 October ===
Kurds clash violently with Turkish police over failure to help Kurds under siege in the Syrian border city of Kobani under siege by ISIL forces. At least fourteen people have died in the clashes.

=== 8 October ===
At least 19 Kurdish civilians were killed while protesting against the government's inaction in defending Kobani from ISIS advances.

Opposition fighters seize Al Harra hill, south of Damascus, after fighting with Assad forces, seizing large quantity of arms and ammunition.

=== 10 October ===
ISIL push to capture the town of Kobani. The town has served as the headquarters of the Kurdish resistance. Reports say ISIS controls nearly 40% of the city. Kurdish leaders requested foreign intervention in an attempt to repel the assault on the town. 12,000 civilians are reported trapped in the city. The Syrian delegate to the UN requested foreign aid, particularly from Turkey, to evacuate the citizens, who will likely face massacre in the event of an ISIS takeover.

=== 11 October ===
The Syrian army continues its offensive in Damascus and on 8 October captured the town of Al-Rayhan near Duma, and on 11 October Ayn Tarma, a decisive blow to the already exhausted Jaysh Al-Islam fighters.

Turkey agrees to allow the training of 2,000 Syrian opposition forces on its soil as Islamic State militants approach to within 1 mile of the centre of the border city of Kobani.

=== 12 October ===
Despite the capture of their headquarters in Kobane, Kurdish fighters continue a fierce resistance. Coalition airstrikes continue to pound the area, but ISIS is unrelenting in their attempts to capture the city.

Meanwhile, in the eastern province of Deir al-Zor, ISIS clashed with the Syrian army.

=== 16 October ===
Shahba Mall in Aleppo was bombed and caused heavy damage which causes the mall to become permanently closed. According to Syrian activists, activists believed that bombing was did by the air force that was loyal to Bashar al-Assad government.

=== 18 October ===
After heavy fighting inside the city of Kobane, Kurdish fighters with support of coalition airstrikes managed to push back IS fighters from most of the city. In the meantime, the Syrian Army continued its offensive north of Aleppo, capturing a glass factory, a cement plant, and the village of Al-Jubeileh near the Aleppo Central Prison. The Syrian Army now has all main supply lines to Aleppo under its control.

=== 22 October ===
The Syrian Air Force claims to have shot down two of the three fighter jets operated by ISIL in northern Syria.

=== 23 October ===
After months of fighting, the Syrian army captured Morek, a strategic town on the highway linking the cities of Hama and Aleppo.

=== 27 October ===
U.N. Secretary-General Ban Ki-Moon reports to the Security Council that the organization has observed the Israeli Defence Forces interacting with, at "terrorist bases," and supplying weapons to rebels, including Al Nusra.

== November 2014 ==
=== 1 November ===
Turkey breaks from its policy of preventing Kurdish fighters from entering Syria and allows 150 Iraqi Peshmerga to cross into Kobanê.

=== 3 November ===
- 3 November – Islamic State militants claim to have captured the Jahar gas fields in Homs, the second gas field they have captured in a week.

=== 5 November ===
- 11 children are killed by mortar fire at a school in Damascus.

=== 9 November ===
Nusra Front and other local rebels capture the southern city of Nawa from Syrian Arab Army forces after months of fighting.

=== 16 November ===
ISIL claims to have executed American hostage Abdul-Rahman Kassig.

=== 23 November ===
ISIL downs one of Syrian Arab Army fighter planes over the city of Deir Ezzor. According to SOHR, the Syrian Arab Army plane had carried out twenty airstrikes over the town the previous night, but it was the first time that ISIS had succeeded in bringing one down.

Almost 100 people were killed and many more critically injured in at least 10 Syrian government airstrikes in Raqqa, according to SOHR. Targets included the city's al-Hani Mosque and the public souk, or market.

=== 25 November ===
Syrian Air Force raids on the city of Raqqa kill at least 36 people.

=== 28 November ===
According to the New Straits Times (a government-controlled Malaysian newspaper), activists and opposition figures indicate the demise of the Revolution to topple Assad, calling the revolt a failure.

According to a Kurdish official and activists, ISIL raids Kobani from a base in Turkey.

=== 29 November ===
Heavy fighting in Kobani kills at least 40 fighters from both ISIL and Kurdish forces.

=== 30 November ===
The pro-regime warplanes carry out aerial bombardments on the residential building in the cities of Jassem, Tafas, killing at least 20 civilians including women and children, and one civilian respectively.

Coalition forces launch over 30 airstrikes on Raqqa, the de facto capital of ISIL. No real positive outcomes according to reports by YPG fighters on the ground: "US air strikes are useless and we only have support from Kurdish fighters and Shia militias."

== December 2014 ==
=== 1 December ===
The United Nations World Food Program suspended a food program for 1.7 million Syrian refugees after donor countries fail to meet their commitments.

=== 6 December ===
17 rebel leaders in southern Syria signed a joint defense pact in order to project a more united front and receive increased backing from Western and Arab backers.

The Syrian Army repelled an ISIL offensive on the Deir ez-Zor air base, resulting in at least 119 casualties total.

=== 7 December ===
The Israeli Air Force bombed two Syrian Armed Forces bases near Damascus and the town of Dimas, according to Russian and Syrian sources.

=== 8 December ===
The United Nations asked for $16.4 billion to fund humanitarian assistance programs in 2015 with Syria, Iraq, Sudan and South Sudan the areas of greatest need.

=== 9 December ===
Rebels in northern Syria announced that the US has stopped paying them, which will affect over 8,000 rebel fighters deployed in Hama and Idlib.

Three Turkish Army soldiers died by gunfire in the town of Ceylanpinar. The local Turkish governor begins an investigation of whether the gunfire came from the Syrian side of the border.

=== 10 December ===
A senior US State Departement official stated that the country's armed opposition would not be able to militarily defeat the Assad government.

=== 14 December ===
After months of violent clashes with Jaysh Al-Islam, the Syrian army declared the East District of Jobar under complete fire control. As a result of this progression, approximately 800 Jaysh Al-Islam militants are now trapped inside Jobar, with almost nowhere to retreat. Meanwhile, the Syrian army continues its offensive in Aleppo by capturing Al-Manasheer, the Al-Bureijj Stone Quarries, and the Wood Factory in the Industrial District near the Al-Jandoul Roundabout in northeast Aleppo.

A battle between Bashar al-Assad loyalist forces and Islamist rebels in Aleppo Governorate left 34 rebels dead and 3 loyalist fighters captured.

=== 15 December ===
Nusra Front and other rebels captured two military bases at Wadi Deif and Hamidiyeh in the Idlib province from government forces, after two years of fighting.

=== 16 December ===
Around one hundred Syrian soldiers and eighty Islamist fighters die in a two-day battle for Wadi Deif, with the Islamic Front capturing over 120 government soldiers.

=== 19 December ===
Foreign Minister Mevlut Cavusoglu says that Turkey may begin training and equipping moderate Syrian opposition fighters before March 2015.

In the five-part video series 'The War Next Door,' a VICE journalist goes behind the scenes with the IDF unit which gathers wounded Syrian rebel fighters in the dead of night and brings them to Israel for treatment.

=== 24 December ===
A Royal Jordanian Air Force warplane crashed, and its pilot was captured by Islamic State of Iraq and the Levant militants near Raqqa.

=== 25 December ===
Videos surfaced of a ceremony honoring the unification of the rebels, who come from groups like the Islamic Front, the Mujahedeen Army, Fastaqim Kama Umirt—a unit of the Free Syrian Army—and the Asala wa-al-Tanmiya Front. The rebels in the northern part of the country advanced in key battlegrounds near Aleppo over the weekend as several groups merged and renamed themselves the Levant Front. It marked the first time since 2012 that rebel groups have officially collaborated to take on President Assad's forces.

=== 31 December ===
The Italian coast guard boarded and regained control of a cargo ship that had been sabotaged and abandoned by human traffickers carrying nearly 1,000 passengers, mostly Syrian refugees, that was in imminent jeopardy of crashing into land.
