= Syrian National Dialogue Conference =

2025 Syrian Caretaker Government Dialogue Conference

- President Ahmed al-Sharaa Addresses the National Dialogue Conference
- Date: 24–25 February 2025
- Location: People's Palace, Damascus, Syria
- Organised by: Syrian caretaker government
- Participants: 900 delegates

The Syrian National Dialogue Conference (Arabic: مؤتمر الحوار الوطني السوري), was a transitional dialogue held at the People's Palace in Damascus, Syria, on 24–25 February 2025, as part of the Syrian caretaker government. It aimed to establish a path to national unity following the fall of the Assad regime, focusing on transitional justice, constitutional and institutional reform, freedoms, civil society, and economic principles. Before the conference, Israel launched airstrikes on Damascus and southern Syria. In response, the conference demanded Israel's immediate and unconditional withdrawal from Syria and rejected Prime Minister Benjamin Netanyahu's opposition to Syrian military presence in the south.

Ahmed al-Sharaa was appointed president on 29 January 2025, after serving as the de facto leader following the fall of the Assad regime. Upon his appointment, he announced plans to hold a "national dialogue conference" and issue a "constitutional declaration" to serve as a legal framework for the political transition following the repeal of the Ba'athist era constitution.

== Background ==
On 8 December 2024, the Assad regime collapsed during a major offensive by opposition forces. The capture of Damascus marked the end of the Assad family's rule, which had governed Syria as a hereditary sectarian totalitarian regime since Hafez al-Assad assumed power in 1971 following a coup d'état. As a rebel coalition moved closer to Damascus, reports indicated that Bashar al-Assad had fled the capital by plane to Russia, where he joined his exiled family and was granted political asylum by the Russian government. After his departure, opposition forces announced their victory on state television. At the same time, Russia's Ministry of Foreign Affairs confirmed his resignation and departure from Syria.

Ahmed al-Sharaa was appointed president by the Syrian General Command after serving as the de facto leader following the fall of the Assad regime on 29 January 2025. After his appointment as president, al-Sharaa, in his first address on 31 January 2025, stated that he would hold a 'national dialogue conference' and issue a 'constitutional declaration' to serve as a 'legal reference' during the political transition following the dissolution of the Ba'athist era constitution.

On 23 February 2025, Israeli Prime Minister Benjamin Netanyahu demanded the complete demilitarization of southern Syria in the provinces of Quneitra, Daraa and Suweyda, and the withdrawal of Syrian forces from Syrian territory south of Damascus. Hours later, Israel conducted a wave of airstrikes in Damascus and southern Syria.

== Members ==
The seven members of the "preparatory committee" are: Hassan Daghim, Maher Alloush, Mohammed Mastet, Youssef al-Hijr, Mustafa al-Moussa, Hind Kabawat and Huda Atassi.

== Outcomes ==
During the Syrian National Dialogue Conference, delegates were organized into working groups to discuss key issues, including the constitution, freedoms, the economy, and civil society. Around 600 delegates from across Syria were invited to the event at the Presidential Palace in Damascus. The representatives of the Syrian Democratic Forces were not invited to the conference, but the organizers stated that the Kurdish community was still present. In his opening speech, Al-Sharaa emphasized unity and cooperation, urging support for Syria in overcoming its hardships. He expressed confidence that others would not abandon the country and announced plans to establish a transitional justice committee. He also stressed the need for armed groups to integrate into the military and for the state to maintain a monopoly on weapons.

Huda Atassi, a member of the Preparatory Committee, stated that the draft constitution proposes a temporary constitutional declaration and a legislative council to shape the country's future, ensuring a balanced distribution of power, justice, freedoms, equality, and a strong legal and institutional foundation.

The conference called for the immediate and unconditional withdrawal of Israeli forces from Syria and rejected Israeli Prime Minister Benjamin Netanyahu’s stance against the presence of Syrian military forces in the south. It also reaffirmed Syria’s unity and sovereignty, firmly opposing any attempts at division, fragmentation, or territorial concessions.

On 24 February 2025, the European Union announced the lifting of several Assad-era sanctions against Syria to support economic recovery and reconstruction efforts, a decision welcomed by Syrian Foreign Minister Asaad al-Shaibani, who also criticized the remaining international sanctions during his speech at the national dialogue conference.

== Reactions ==
The Kurdish National Council in Syria criticized the conference as a disgrace and a violation of the Kurdish people's fundamental right to national unity in Syria. Syrian activist Majd Izzat al-Chourbaji, who took part in the economy committee, praised the conference as well-organized but noted that limited time allowed participants to speak only once.

Bahrain welcomed the Syrian National Dialogue Conference, calling it a key step toward building a Syrian state based on citizenship, the rule of law, and strong constitutional institutions. Oman welcomed the Syrian National Dialogue Conference and reaffirmed its support for its goal of uniting all political factions. Saudi Arabia welcomed the Syrian National Dialogue Conference, hoping it would support the goals of the Syrian people and strengthen national unity. The United Arab Emirates welcomed the Syrian National Dialogue Conference and reaffirmed its support for efforts to promote peace, development, and prosperity in Syria.

== See also ==
- Syrian Revolution Victory Conference
- History of Syria
