= Al-Anfal Brigade =

- Leader: Abu Mazen al-Rifai
- Active regions: Rif Dimashq Governorate; Daraa Governorate
- Size: Several hundreds
- Part of: National Defense Force; Free Syrian Army (formerly); Syria Revolutionaries Front (formerly); Southern Front (formerly); First Army (formerly)
- Wars: the Syrian Civil War

The Al-Anfal Brigade was a Syrian rebel group affiliated with the Syria Revolutionaries Front coalition. It was armed with U.S.-made BGM-71 TOW anti-tank missiles. The group operates in the southern provinces of Syria and joined the Southern Front on 14 February 2014. The brigade left their position in Yarmouk Camp and joined the National Defense Force on 8 March 2015.

== See also ==
- List of armed groups in the Syrian Civil War
