= Syrian Republics =

Four states in the region of Syria have borne the name Syrian Republic, Republic of Syria, or Syrian Arab Republic:

The flag of the First Syrian Republic, later used by the Second Syrian Republic.

- First Syrian Republic, 1930–1950:
  - Mandatory Syrian Republic, 1930–1946: Formed as a component of the Mandate for Syria and the Lebanon, succeeding the State of Syria. A treaty of independence was made in 1936 to grant independence to Syria and end official French rule, but the French parliament refused to accept the agreement. From 1940 to 1941, the Syrian Republic was under the control of Vichy France, and after the Allied invasion in 1941 gradually went on the path towards independence. The proclamation of independence took place in 1944, but only in October 1945 Syrian Republic was de jure recognized by the United Nations; it became a de facto sovereign state on 17 April 1946, with the withdrawal of French troops.
  - Independent First Syrian Republic, 1946–1950: Recognized as a sovereign state in 1945 and becoming de facto independent in April 1946 from the Mandate for Syria and the Lebanon.
- Second Syrian Republic, 1950–1963:
  - 1950–1958: Beginning with the Syrian Constitution of 1950.
  - 1958–1961: Syria joined with the Republic of Egypt in forming the United Arab Republic.
  - 1961–1963: Syria withdrew from the union in 1961 and adopted the name Syrian Arab Republic.
- Ba'athist Syria, 1963–2024: The Arab Socialist Ba'ath Party – Syria Region came to power in a coup d'état, adopting the name Syrian Arab Republic.
- Syria under the Syrian transitional government (2025–present) has retained the official name Syrian Arab Republic.
