= List of presidents of the Supreme Constitutional Court (Syria) =

Head of the Supreme Constitutional Court of Syria

President of the Supreme Constitutional Court of Syria
- رئيس المحكمة الدستورية العليا في سوريا (Arabic)
- Emblem of Syria

- Flag of Syria
- Incumbent; Issam al-Khalif since 11 July 2026
- Supreme Constitutional Court
- Style: Court President (informal)
- Status: Chief Justice
- Member of: Supreme Constitutional Court
- Residence: Damascus
- Seat: Syria
- Appointer: President
- Term length: At the president's pleasure
- Constituting instrument: Constitutional Declaration (2025)
- Formation: 1973; 53 years ago 2026; 0 years ago (current form)

This is a chronological list of presidents of the Supreme Constitutional Court since its establishment in 1973 and its re-establishment in 2026. As the presiding officer of a court composed of seven members, including its president, the President of the Supreme Constitutional Court represents the court. Issam al-Khalif is the current president.

The last person to hold the position of President of the Supreme Constitutional Court under Ba'athist Syria was Mohammad Jihad al-Laham, who remained in office until the fall of the Assad regime.

== List of presidents of the Supreme Constitutional Court ==
| No. | Name | Took office | Left office | Appointed by |
|---|---|---|---|---|
Ba'athist Syria (1973–2024)
| 1 | Adnan Zureiq | 22 May 2012 | 8 May 2018 | Bashar al-Assad |
| 2 | Mohammad Jihad al-Laham | 8 May 2018 | 8 December 2024 | Bashar al-Assad |
Transitional period (2024–present)
Vacant (8 December 2024 – 11 July 2026)
| 3 | Issam al-Khalif | 11 July 2026 | Incumbent | Ahmed al-Sharaa |

== See also ==
- Judiciary of Syria
