= Mohammad Jihad al-Laham =

Syrian politician and jurist (born 1954)

- محمد جهاد اللحام
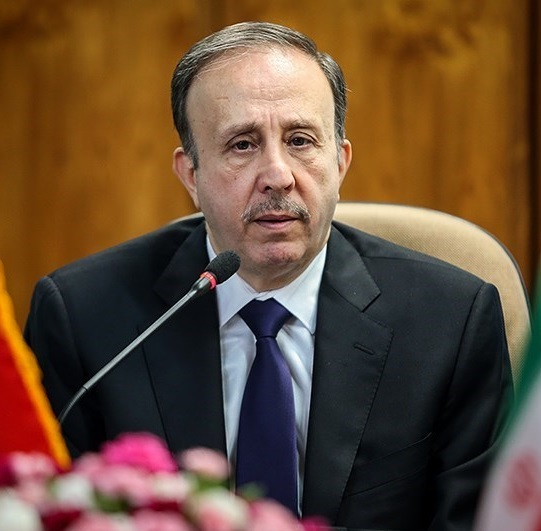
- Al-Laham in 2015

President of the Supreme Constitutional Court
- In office 8 May 2018 – 8 December 2024
- Appointed by: Bashar al-Assad
- Preceded by: Adnan Zureiq
- Succeeded by: Issam al-Khalif^{[a]}

Speaker of the People's Assembly
- In office 24 May 2012 – 6 June 2016
- Preceded by: Mahmoud al-Abrash
- Succeeded by: Hadiya Khalaf Abbas

Member of the Central Command of the Ba'ath Party
- In office 8 July 2013 – 6 June 2016

Personal details
- Born: 13 January 1954 (age 72) Damascus, Syrian Republic
- Party: Arab Socialist Ba'ath Party (until 2024)
- Other political affiliations: National Progressive Front
- Education: Damascus University (BA)
- Vacant until 11 July 2026.

Mohammad Jihad al-Laham (Arabic: محمد جهاد اللحام, born 13 January 1954) is a Syrian politician and jurist who served as Speaker of the People's Assembly from 2012 to 2016. A prominent criminal defense lawyer, he previously held the position of Head of the Damascus Bar Association Branch Office from 1997 to 2001 and served as chairman of its council from 2005 to 2013.

In the 2012 parliamentary elections, al-Laham was elected as a representative of Damascus Governoratefor the Arab Socialist Ba'ath Party. On 24 May 2012, he was elected Speaker of the People's Assembly, receiving 225 votes. His appointment was among the first actions of the newly formed Syrian Parliament under the 2012 Constitution. Upon his election as Speaker, al-Laham stated that "Syria is passing through a stage that requires every individual to exert his efforts" and that "the Assembly should be a mirror that reflects the reality of all Syrians and meet their aspirations."

Al-Laham was re-elected to the People's Assembly in 2016 and served until his appointment by President Bashar al-Assad to the Supreme Constitutional Court in 2018, a position he was reappointed to in 2022. His term came to an end after the overthrow of Bashar al-Assad in 2024.

Legal offices
Preceded by Adnan Zureiq	President of the Supreme Constitutional Court; 2018–2024	Succeeded by Issam al-Khalif (2026)
