= People's Palace (Syria) =

Official residence of the president of Syria

Coordinates: 33°31′4″N 36°15′6″E

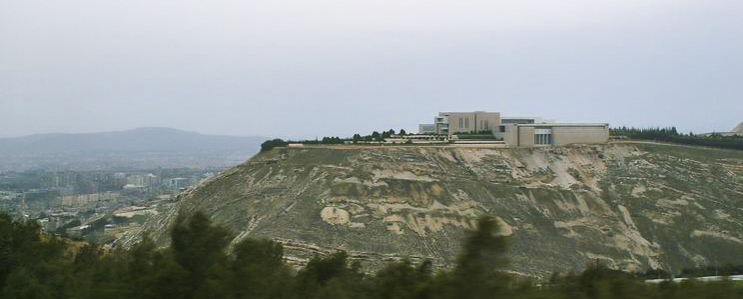
- Interactive map of the People's Palace area
- Alternative names: New Shaab Palace, Qasr ash-Shaab, Presidential Palace

General information
- Architectural style: Structuralistic
- Location: 7th April Street, Damascus, Damascus, Syria
- Current tenants: Ahmed al-Sharaa, President of Syria, and his family
- Construction started: 1985
- Completed: 1990
- Cost: LS 13 billion ($1 billion)
- Owner: Syrian transitional government
- Governing body: Secretary-General, Oweis al-Sharaa

Design and construction
- Architects: Kenzo Tange, Wojciech Zabłocki
- Engineer: Oger Liban

The People's Palace (Arabic: قصر الشعب), known in English as the Presidential Palace until 2024, is the official residence of the president of Syria. It is located in the western part of Damascus, on Mount Mezzeh, north of Mezzeh, next to Mount Qasioun, and overlooking the entire city. The main building covers 31,500 square metres (340,000 square feet). The entire plateau of Mount Mezzeh is part of the palace compound and is surrounded by a security wall and guard watchtowers. Near the façade of the building is a large fountain, with the palace itself largely consisting of empty rooms clad in Carrara marble.

== History ==
=== Ba'athist Syria (1985–2024) ===
Japanese architect Kenzo Tange is credited with the design. He reputedly resigned from the project before construction of the palace began. The brass front gates were created by the noted Syrian metalwork artist Maurice Nseiri.

The palace premises cover about 510,000 square metres (5,500,000 square feet) and also includes a private presidential hospital and the headquarters of the Republican Guard. Hafez al-Assad commissioned the plans for the building in 1979. Udo Kultermann has characterised the building as "feudalistic architecture".

The palace was frequently used for hosting government delegations and foreign government visitors. On 27 October 1994, Bill Clinton met Hafez al-Assad at the palace to negotiate a peace plan between Syria and Israel.

=== Transitional government (2024–present) ===
On 8 December 2024, during Syrian opposition offensives, anti-Assad forces entered the palace. Bashar al-Assad fled Syria, seeking asylum in Russia, resulting in the fall of his regime.

As of April 2026, the palace is used for diplomatic functions by the Syrian transitional government. On 29 January 2025, the palace hosted the Syrian Revolution Victory Conference, attended by commanders of various armed revolutionary factions who fought for the Syrian opposition coalition against the deposed regime of Bashar al-Assad. Between 24–25 February 2025, the palace hosted the Syrian National Dialogue Conference as part of the Syrian caretaker government to pave the way for national unity following the fall of the Assad regime. On 29 March 2025, the Syrian transitional government was announced by Syrian president Ahmed al-Sharaa at a ceremony at the palace, in which the new ministers were sworn in and delivered speeches outlining their agendas.

On 2 May 2025, after the Syrian transitional government clashed with Druze militias south of Damascus, the Israeli Air Force fired missiles at parts of Mount Mezzeh and areas near the presidential palace. The airstrike was a "message" to al-Sharaa to halt his offensive against the Druze. On 16 July 2025, parts of Mount Mezzeh near the outskirts of Damascus were struck by the Israeli Air Force after the Syrian Army deployed soldiers to Suwayda, in an attempt to restore order in Suwayda, with relation to the 2025 Southern Syria clashes.

Ahmed al-Sharaa's nephew, Oweis al-Sharaa, is Secretary-General of the Presidential Palace.
