= 2017 in Syria =

- Decades: 1990s; 2000s; 2010s; 2020s
- See also: History of Syria; Timeline of Syrian history; List of years in Syria

Events during the year 2017 in Syria.

== Incumbents ==
Office	Image	Name	Assumed office / Current length
President of the Syrian Arab Republic		Bashar al-Assad	17 July 2000 (26 years ago)
Vice President of the Syrian Arab Republic		Najah al-Attar	23 March 2006 (20 years ago)
Speaker of the People's Assembly		Hadiya Khalaf Abbas	2 June 2016 – 18 July 2017
Speaker of the People's Assembly		Hammouda Sabbagh	18 September 2017 (8 years ago)
President of the Supreme Constitutional Court		Adnan Zureiq	2 September 2012 (13 years ago)
Prime Minister of the Syrian Arab Republic		Imad Khamis	3 July 2016 (10 years ago)

== Events ==
For events related to the Civil War, see Timeline of the Syrian Civil War (January–April 2017), Timeline of the Syrian Civil War (May–August 2017) and Timeline of the Syrian Civil War (September–December 2017)

== Deaths ==
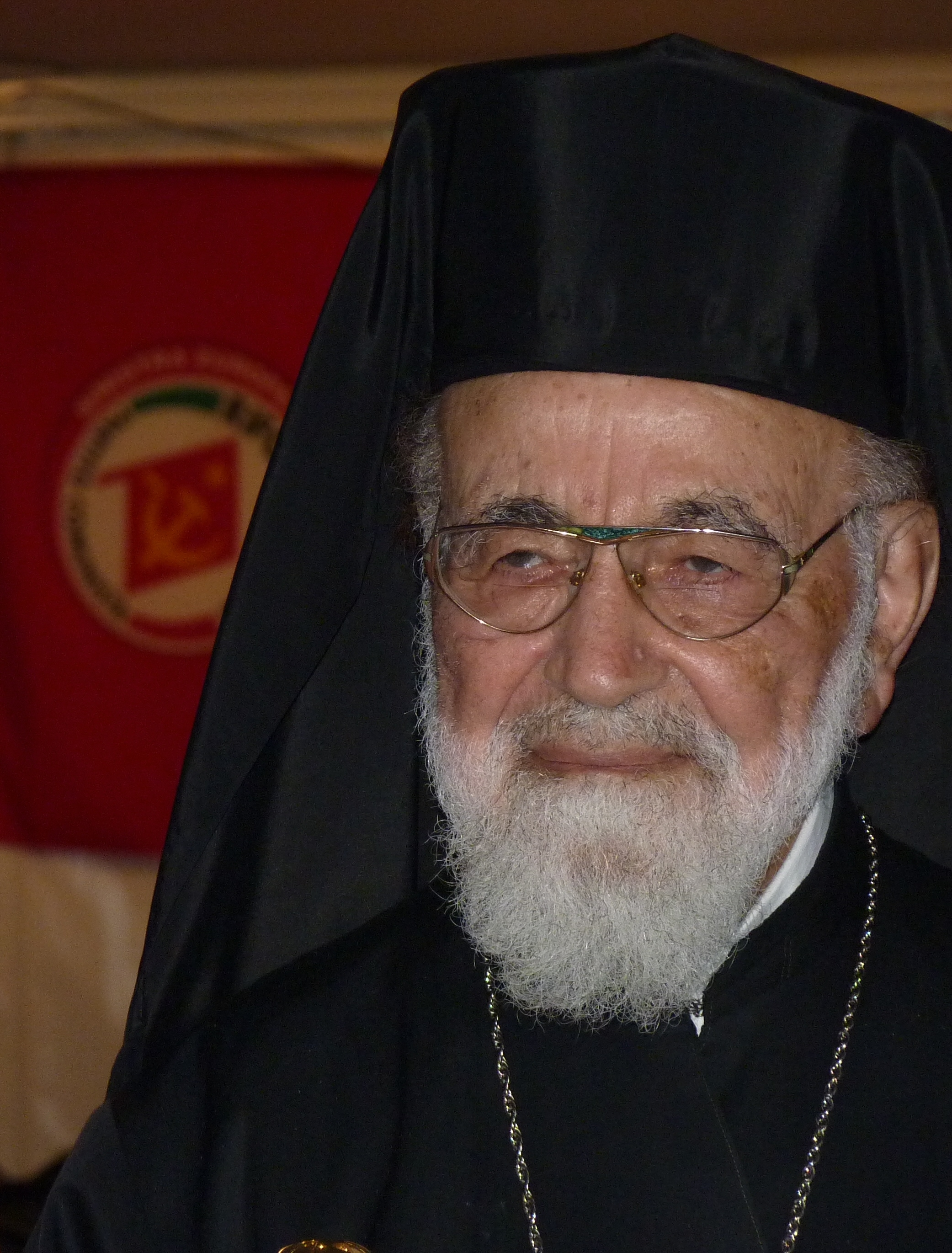
Hilarion Capucci

- 1 January – Hilarion Capucci, Syrian Catholic bishop, titular archbishop of Caesarea in the Melkite Greek Catholic Church, died in Rome, Italy at the age of 94 (b. 1922)
- 5 January – Rafiq Subaie, actor and writer (b. 1930).
- 13 January – Zainuri Kamaruddin, Malaysian Islamist militant, killed in Syria (b. 1966/67).
