= 2016 in Syria =

- Decades: 1990s; 2000s; 2010s; 2020s
- See also: History of Syria; Timeline of Syrian history; List of years in Syria

The following lists events that happened during 2016 in Syria.

== Incumbents ==
Office	Image	Name	Assumed office / Current length
President of the Syrian Arab Republic		Bashar al-Assad	17 July 2000 (26 years ago)
Vice President of the Syrian Arab Republic		Najah al-Attar	23 March 2006 (20 years ago)
Speaker of the People's Assembly		Mohammad Jihad al-Laham	24 May 2012 – 6 June 2016
Speaker of the People's Assembly		Hadiya Khalaf Abbas	2 June 2016 (10 years ago)
President of the Supreme Constitutional Court		Adnan Zureiq	2 September 2012 (13 years ago)
Prime Minister of the Syrian Arab Republic		Wael Nader al-Halqi	9 August 2012 – 3 July 2016
Prime Minister of the Syrian Arab Republic		Imad Khamis	3 July 2016 (10 years ago)

== Events ==
For events related to the Civil War, see Timeline of the Syrian Civil War (January–April 2016), Timeline of the Syrian Civil War (May–August 2016) and Timeline of the Syrian Civil War (September–December 2016)

== See also ==
- Timeline of Syrian history
