= 2019 in Syria =

- Decades: 1990s; 2000s; 2010s; 2020s
- See also: History of Syria; Timeline of Syrian history; List of years in Syria

This article lists events from the year 2019 in Syria.

== Incumbents ==
| Office | Image | Name | Assumed office / Current length |
|---|---|---|---|
| President of the Syrian Arab Republic | | Bashar al-Assad | 17 July 2000 (26 years ago) |
| Vice President of the Syrian Arab Republic | | Najah al-Attar | 23 March 2006 (20 years ago) |
| Speaker of the People's Assembly | | Hammouda Sabbagh | 18 September 2017 (8 years ago) |
| President of the Supreme Constitutional Court | | Mohammad Jihad al-Laham | 18 May 2018 (8 years ago) |
| Prime Minister of the Syrian Arab Republic | | Imad Khamis | 3 July 2016 (10 years ago) |

== Events ==
For events related to the Civil War, see Timeline of the Syrian Civil War (January–April 2019), Timeline of the Syrian Civil War (May–August 2019) and Timeline of the Syrian Civil War (September–December 2019)

== Deaths ==
- 8 June - Abdul Baset al-Sarout, 27, Syrian association football goalkeeper.
- 27 October - Abu Bakr al-Baghdadi, 48, leader of Islamic State of Iraq and the Levant.
