= 2023 in Syria =

- Decades: 2000s; 2010s; 2020s
- See also: History of Syria; Timeline of Syrian history; List of years in Syria

Events in the year 2023 in Syria

== Incumbents ==
Office	Image	Name	Assumed office / Current length
President of the Syrian Arab Republic		Bashar al-Assad	17 July 2000 (26 years ago)
Vice President of the Syrian Arab Republic		Faisal Mekdad	24 September 2023 (2 years ago)
Vice President of the Syrian Arab Republic		Najah al-Attar	23 March 2006 (20 years ago)
Speaker of the People's Assembly		Hammouda Sabbagh	18 September 2017 (8 years ago)
President of the Supreme Constitutional Court		Mohammad Jihad al-Laham	18 May 2018 (8 years ago)
Prime Minister of the Syrian Arab Republic		Hussein Arnous	2 September 2020 (5 years ago)

== Events ==
For events related to the civil war, see Timeline of the Syrian civil war (2023)

- 22 January – At least 13 people are killed when a five-story building collapses in Aleppo, due to a leaking of water in the building's foundation.
- 6 February – 2023 Turkey–Syria earthquakes
- 10 February – The death toll in the Turkey-Syria earthquakes has passed 23,000.
- 17 February – Islamic State gunmen massacre 68 people in Al-Sukhnah in Homs Governorate, including 61 civilians who were truffle hunting.
- 23 February – Fifteen people are killed and 40 others are kidnapped in Hama Governorate during an ambush on truffle hunters by Islamic State members.
- 29 March – Syrian President Bashar al-Assad reshuffles the government's cabinet amid an increase in prices and shortages of food due to the severe economic situation the country, which was worsened by the recent earthquake.
- 9 April – Eight people are killed after a land mine planted by Islamic State members explodes in Deir ez-Zor.
- 16 April – At least 36 people are killed after Islamic State fighters attack a group of truffle hunters in Hama Governorate.
- 16 April – 5 shepherds are killed when Islamic State gunmen open fire at them in Deir ez-Zor.
- 10 August – Emergence of the 10th August movement of renewed civil protest against the government.
- 17 August – Start of general strike and 2023 Syrian protests.
- 22 September – President Bashar al-Assad visits China, meets with China's President Xi Jinping, and signs a strategic partnership with China on infrastructure as part of China's Belt and Road Initiative.
- 12 October – Syria says Israel has launched airstrikes on Damascus International Airport and Aleppo International Airport. Air defences were activated in response to the attacks.
- 25 October – The Israeli Air Force launches airstrikes on "military infrastructure" of the Syrian Armed Forces in Daraa Governorate, killing eight Syrian soldiers and injuring seven others.
- 27 October – The U.S. military says that it has conducted airstrikes on Iran-backed targets in Syria linked to the Islamic Revolutionary Guard Corps.
- 8 November – At least 30 pro-government militia forces and soldiers are killed in a series of attacks by the Islamic State (IS) near the cities of Deir ez-Zor, Homs, and Raqqa, with Russian airstrikes targeting the IS positions in response.
- 8 December – Syria says an Israeli airstrike has killed four people in a vehicle in Madinat al-Baath, Quneitra Governorate. Local media reports the victims were affiliated with Iran-backed militias. Shortly after the airstrike, rocket sirens are triggered in Israel's Galilee region.
- 12 December – Several drug dealers and a soldier are killed during a shootout at Jordan's border with Syria.
- 17 December – Syrian military shelling in Aleppo Governorate kills six civilians in Darat Izza and two civilians in Abzimou.
- 25 December – High-ranking Iranian general Sayyed Razi Mousavi is killed in an Israeli airstrike in Syria.
- 30 December – Four Hezbollah members and two other militants are killed during three airstrikes at Syria's border with Iraq.

== Deaths ==
- 6 February – Nader Joukhadar, 45, football player (Al-Wathba, national team) and manager (Salam Zgharta).
