= 2021 in Syria =

- Decades: 2000s; 2010s; 2020s
- See also: History of Syria; Timeline of Syrian history; List of years in Syria

Events in the year 2021 in Syria.

== Incumbents ==
Office	Image	Name	Assumed office / Current length
President of the Syrian Arab Republic		Bashar al-Assad	17 July 2000 (26 years ago)
Vice President of the Syrian Arab Republic		Najah al-Attar	23 March 2006 (20 years ago)
Speaker of the People's Assembly		Hammouda Sabbagh	18 September 2017 (8 years ago)
President of the Supreme Constitutional Court		Mohammad Jihad al-Laham	18 May 2018 (8 years ago)
Prime Minister of the Syrian Arab Republic		Hussein Arnous	2 September 2020 (5 years ago)

== Events ==
For events related to the Civil War, see Timeline of the Syrian civil war (2021)

Ongoing — COVID-19 pandemic in Syria

=== January ===
- 27 January: Over 67,600 internally displaced persons (IDPs) across 196 sites in Idlib and Aleppo have again been displaced due to heavy rains, which destroyed tents, food and belongings.

=== April ===
- 22 April: 256,800 AstraZeneca COVID-19 vaccines arrived in Syria, under the UN backed COVAX initiative to vaccinate frontline health workers. Provided by the Serum Institute of India, the majority of the doses arrived in Damascus, while 53,000 doses were delivered to the northwest.

=== May ===
- 26 May – Syria holds the 2021 presidential election, with incumbent President Bashar al-Assad announced as the winner of the race with 95% of total vote. The election, however, was deemed as a sham.

=== August ===
- 10 August - Syrian President Bashar al-Assad appointed a new cabinet.

== Deaths ==
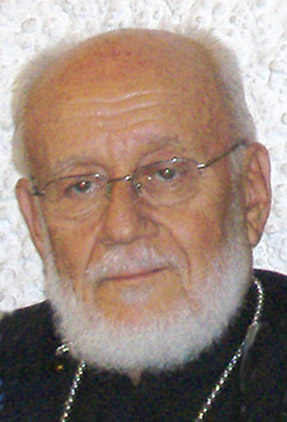
Boulos Nassif Borkhoche

- 4 February – Boulos Nassif Borkhoche, archbishop (born 1932).
