= 2007 in Syria =

- Decades: 1980s; 1990s; 2000s; 2010s; 2020s
- See also: Other events of 2007; List of years in Syria

The following lists events that happened during 2007 in Syria.

== Incumbents ==
- President: Bashar al-Assad
- Vice President:
  - Farouk al-Sharaa
  - Najah al-Attar
- Prime Minister: Muhammad Naji al-Otari

== Events ==
=== January ===
- January 15 - The Syrian government may sign an agreement in which it will recognize Israel and end its support for Hezbollah and Hamas in return for Israeli withdrawal from most of the Golan Heights.
- January 21 - Palestinian Authority President Mahmoud Abbas and Hamas leader Khaled Meshaal meet together in Syria to try to end violence between the two factions. However, differences remain and talks will resume possibly next week.

=== February ===
- February 5 - Syrian President Bashar al-Assad has said his country can play a major role in international efforts to end the civil war in Iraq.

=== March ===
- March 10 - A major international conference starts in Baghdad, Iraq, to look at ways to stabilise Iraq featuring representatives from Iran, Syria and the United States.

=== April ===
- April 3 - United States Speaker of the House of Representatives Nancy Pelosi travels to Syria for talks with President Bashar al-Assad as she continues a visit to the Middle East disregarding the objections of the Bush administration.

=== May ===
- May 10 - President Bashar al-Assad states that Syria will not cooperate with a United Nations tribunal to try suspects in the suspected assassination of former Prime Minister of Lebanon Rafiq al-Hariri.
- May 29 - Bashar al-Assad is re-elected as President of Syria in an election in which he was the only candidate.

=== September ===
- September 6 - Syria accuses Israel of invading its airspace on Wednesday and dropping ammunition. The operation, known as Operation Orchard, is later speculated to be a raid on a nuclear site being run in collaboration with North Korean technicians, or a raid on a Hezbollah convoy, a missile facility or a terrorist camp.
- September 18 - North Korea denies allegations that it is helping Syria to develop a nuclear weapons facility.

=== October ===
- October 2 - Israel confirms it conducted an airstrike on Syria on September 6.
- October 20 - Iraqi President Jalal Talabani criticizes Syrian President Bashar al-Assad for his support of a possible Turkish attack against Kurdistan Workers Party fighters in the Iraqi Kurdistan.

=== November ===
- November 25 - Syria accepts a United States invitation to participate in the 2007 Mideast peace conference.
