= 2020 in Syria =

- Decades: 2000s; 2010s; 2020s
- See also: History of Syria; Timeline of Syrian history; List of years in Syria

This article lists events from the year 2020 in Syria.

== Incumbents ==
Office	Image	Name	Assumed office / Current length
President of the Syrian Arab Republic		Bashar al-Assad	17 July 2000 (26 years ago)
Vice President of the Syrian Arab Republic		Najah al-Attar	23 March 2006 (20 years ago)
Speaker of the People's Assembly		Hammouda Sabbagh	18 September 2017 (9 years ago)
President of the Supreme Constitutional Court		Mohammad Jihad al-Laham	18 May 2018 (8 years ago)
Prime Minister of the Syrian Arab Republic		Imad Khamis	3 July 2016 – 11 June 2020
Prime Minister of the Syrian Arab Republic		Hussein Arnous	Acting: 11 June – 2 September 2020 2 September 2020 (6 years ago)

== Events ==
For events related to the Civil War, see History of the Syrian Civil War (2020–present)

== Deaths ==
- March 20 – Ali Habib Mahmud, former defense minister (b. 1939).
- March 31 – Abdul Halim Khaddam, former vice president (b. 1932).
- May 13 – Riad Ismat, former minister of culture (b. 1947).
- May 21 – Mamoon al-Farkh, actor and theater director (b. 1958).
- September 3 – Ahmed Al-Qadri, agriculture and agrarian minister (b. 1956).
- September 12 – Mohammed Makhlouf, Syrian businessman and the uncle of President Bashar al-Assad.
- November 16 – Walid Muallem, deputy prime minister (b. 1941).

== See also ==
- Syria
- History of Syria
- Outline of Syria
- Politics of Syria
- Government of Syria

=== Specific issues and events ===
- Syrian Civil War
- Timeline of the Syrian Civil War
- COVID-19 pandemic in Syria
