= 2022 in Syria =

- Decades: 2000s; 2010s; 2020s
- See also: History of Syria; Timeline of Syrian history; List of years in Syria

Events in the year 2022 in Syria

== Incumbents ==
Office	Image	Name	Assumed office / Current length
President of the Syrian Arab Republic		Bashar al-Assad	17 July 2000 (26 years ago)
Vice President of the Syrian Arab Republic		Najah al-Attar	23 March 2006 (20 years ago)
Speaker of the People's Assembly		Hammouda Sabbagh	18 September 2017 (8 years ago)
President of the Supreme Constitutional Court		Mohammad Jihad al-Laham	18 May 2018 (8 years ago)
Prime Minister of the Syrian Arab Republic		Hussein Arnous	2 September 2020 (5 years ago)

== Events ==
For events related to the civil war, see Timeline of the Syrian civil war (2022)

- 20–30 January - The Battle of al-Hasakah, a large-scale Islamic State (IS) attack and prison riot aimed at freeing arrested IS fighters from al-Sina'a prison in Al-Hasakah, which resulted in a partial strategic victory and major propaganda victory for IS over the Kurdish-led and US-backed Syrian Democratic Forces (SDF), with hundreds of prisoners, including important Emirs, being freed from captivity. The attack was the largest IS attack since it lost its last key Syrian territory in 2019. 346 IS and 154 SDF fighters were killed, the SDF arrested 1,100 prisoners and 400 prisoners were found missing.
- 3 February: ISIL leader Abu Ibrahim al-Qurashi killed himself during a raid by US special forces on a house in Atme. According to the Syrian Observatory for Human Rights, thirteen other people, including seven civilians, died during the raid.
- 22 February – Syria voices support for Russia's recognition of the Donetsk People's Republic and the Luhansk People's Republic as independent states.
- 1 March – Eleven people die after a fire breaks out in a mall in Damascus.
- 18–20 June - Clashes took place between Ahrar al-Sham and the Levant Front, two factions of the Turkish-backed Syrian National Army, across the Turkish-occupied areas of the Aleppo Governorate. Ahrar al-Sham was supported by Hayat Tahrir al-Sham (HTS) from the latter's territories in the Idlib Governorate, while the Sham Legion and Jaysh al-Islam backed the Levant Front.
- 20 July – The Foreign Ministry of Syria announces that the country is formally suspending diplomatic relations with Ukraine.
- 22 July - Israel attacked government military positions near Damascus, killing three Syrian government soldiers and wounding seven others.
- 4 September – A Syrian Air Force helicopter crashes in Hama, Syria, killing all of the people on board.
- 7 September – Eleven people are killed and two others are injured by a building collapse in Aleppo.
- 10 September – The Kurdish administration in Syria, the Autonomous Administration of North and East Syria, requests help from the World Health Organization to contain a cholera outbreak which has killed three people in the region.
- 22 September – At least 71 people are killed when a boat carrying migrants from Lebanon capsizes off Syria's coast.
- 26 September – The death toll from the cholera outbreak in Syria increases to 29, with a total of 338 cases reported, the majority of whom are in Aleppo Governorate.
- 5 December – Protests occur in the town of Atarib, Aleppo Governorate, after a Turkish military vehicle ran over and killed a woman and a child while conducting a patrol with a local rebel group, according to the Syrian Observatory for Human Rights.

== Deaths ==
- 30 January – Jawdat Said, 90, Islamic scholar.
- 19 February – Walid Ikhlasi, 86, writer.
- 23 February – Edmund Keeley, 94, Syrian-born American novelist and poet.
- 11 March – Mohammed Saeed Bekheitan, 77, politician.
- 15 May – Dhu al-Himma Shalish, 71, military officer.
- 4 July – Khairy Alzahaby, 76, novelist and historian.
- 5 August – Ali Haydar, 90, military officer.
- 28 October – Safwan al-Qudsi, 82, politician, MP (since 1977).
- 10 November – Humaydi Daham al-Hadi, 86, politician, co-governor of the Jazira canton (since 2014).
- 26 December – Munira al-Qubaysi, 89, Islamic scholar, founder of Al-Qubaysiat.
