= 1971 in Syria =

- Decades: 1950s; 1960s; 1970s; 1980s; 1990s
- See also: Other events of 1971; List of years in Syria

Events in the year 1971 in Syria.

== Incumbent ==
Post	Name
President of Syria	Ahmad al-Khatib (until 12 March); Hafez al-Assad (starting 12 March)
Vice President of Syria	Mahmoud al-Ayyubi (starting 22 February)
Prime Minister of Syria	Hafez al-Assad (until 3 April); Abdul Rahman Khleifawi (starting 3 April)
Cabinet of Syria	Hafez al-Assad Government

== Events ==
=== March ===
- 22 March: 1971 Syrian presidential election

=== September ===
- 1 September: 1971 Syrian Federation of Arab Republics referendum

== Sport ==
- Syria at the 1971 Mediterranean Games
