= Timeline of the Syrian civil war (May–August 2016) =

The following is a timeline of the Syrian Civil War from May to August 2016. Information about aggregated casualty counts is found at Casualties of the Syrian Civil War.

== May 2016 ==
=== 12 May ===
- Mustafa Badreddine, a senior Hezbollah is killed by suspected artillery bombardment by an armed Sunni group at Damascus International Airport.
- Opposition fighters, consisting of Ahrar al-Sham and the al Qaeda-affiliated Nusra Front capture the Syrian Alawite village of al-Zara and dozens of Alawite civilians are kidnapped.

=== 14 May ===
- Militants of the Abu Amarah Battalion fired a rocket at the Radio and TV Center in Aleppo, Syria. The attack left four journalists wounded.

=== 23 May ===
- Reuters reports nearly 150 people are killed and at least 200 wounded in a series of car bomb and suicide attacks in the Syrian cities of Jableh and Tartus in government-controlled territory that hosts Russian military bases. The Islamic State of Iraq and the Levant group claims responsibility.

=== 24 May ===
- New satellite imagery from Stratfor appears to reveal the destruction of four Russian attack helicopters and 20 lorries at the Tiyas military airbase after a reported attack which was conducted last week by the ISIL.
- U.S. backed Syrian Democratic Forces, led by Kurdish forces, launch an operation to capture Raqqa, the de facto capital of Islamic State of Iraq and Syria. One week later the offensive stalls.
- Nusra Front rebels have captured the town of Deir Khabiyeh, south of Damascus.

=== 27 May ===
- ISIS captures Kafr Kalbeen and Kaljibrin villages from rebel forces in northern Aleppo, cutting the supply lines toward the rebel stronghold of Mare.

=== 30 May ===
- Russian aircraft conducts eight air strikes targeting the Syrian National Hospital in Idlib city left at least 50 dead with another 250 injured. As many as 17 of the 50 killed are believed to be children.

=== 31 May ===
- Syrian Democratic Forces seizes 11 villages and farms from the Islamic State in northern countryside of Raqqa. Meanwhile, a pro-government source announces SAA advancing towards Al-Raqqa City in race to capture it.
- Syrian government aircraft conducts heavy raids on residential areas for months in Idlib, killing more than 30 people and injuring dozens.

== June 2016 ==
=== 3 June ===
- Syrian government bombing raids in and around Aleppo city kill 31 civilians, including 10 when their bus was hit.

=== 4 June ===
- Russian Foreign Ministry says that the United States asked the Russia not to carry airstrikes on al-Qaeda linked Nusra Front to avoid "moderate opposition" being hit.

=== 5 June ===
- Syrian government air strikes hit the Qaterji neighborhood in Aleppo killed nine civilians, and two others, including a child, were killed in the Mayssar neighborhood of the city. Another five civilians are killed in two other districts and on the city’s outskirts.
- Syrian government and Russian jets bomb the rebel-held Idlib, setting fire to a bustling market in the heart of the city, injuring more than 30 people, and killing at least three.

=== 8 June ===
- Regime air strikes on the UN's children's agency UNICEF and doctors at Al-Hakim children's hospital, the nearby Al-Bayan hospital away and the Abdulhadi Fares Clinic, in the rebel-controlled part of Aleppo city spark a desperate bid by medical staff to rescue at least nine newborns and kill 15 people.

=== 9 June ===
- The besieged rebel-held Darayya town receives its first United Nations food delivery since 2012. Shortly afterwards, Assad forces bombard the town, dropping indiscriminate barrel bombs from helicopters as residents shared food. The United States condemns Assad regime, accusing it of bombing starving civilians just hours after they received a long-delayed UN aid shipment. France also voices outrage, accusing Damascus of "extraordinary duplicity”, saying the regime had finally granted access for aid after heavy international pressure “and then the bombing restarted."

=== 10 June ===
- A friendly fire incident in late May in which American aircraft bombed by error a U.S raised rebel group ("Mustafa Sejry") is acknowledged by U.S Central Command. According to an official, 4 anti-ISIL personnel were killed by error, whilst other sources claim 10 were killed.

=== 17 June ===
- Government helicopters strike residential neighborhoods of Katirci and Tarik el-Bab in opposition-held parts of Aleppo city, killing 15 civilians and injuring dozens of others.
- 352 ISIS fighters and 37 SDF combatants, as well as an estimated 78 civilians are killed in a series of bombings executed by the ISIS to fend off the SDF attack on Manbij stronghold.
- During the night of 17 and 18 June, the jihadist rebels led by al-Nusra imposed full control over the Southern Aleppo villages of Khalsah, Zeitan and Birnah, despite suffering heavy losses, including the death of a top commander. Overall, 186 fighters on both sides were killed in the fighting over the previous four days, 100 rebels and 86 pro-government fighters.

=== 19 June ===
- Government barrel bomb attacks in Raqqa's Tabka district killing 10, including women and children, and wounding 35.

=== 26 June ===
- Syrian government and Russian air strikes hit ISIS-held al-Quriyah town in the suburbs of Deir Az Zor, killing at least 82 people, including 58 civilians.

== July 2016 ==
=== 1 July ===
- The Army of Conquest captures the town of Kansaba in the province of Latakia from government forces.
- Three government officers are killed when their helicopter crashes in the south near ISIS-held territory.
- Government attack hits a crowded market in the Tariq al-Bab district in Aleppo city, killing 17 including five children. Meanwhile, a coalition airstrike targeting the ISIS in Majib kills 9 civilians including 7 children.

=== 2 July ===
- Heavy Syrian Arir Force bombardment of a rebel-held Jayrud town kill at least 31 people including two medical staff. The town's medical center is hit and its director Amjad al-Danaf is killed. Ahrar al-Sham attacks nearby government positions "in response to warplanes shelling Jayrud".
- Two women and a child are killed in regime shelling of the eastern rebel-held Sayf al-Dawla neighborhood of Aleppo.

=== 3 July ===
- A suicide bomber militant of an organization close to ISIS kills 7 rebel commanders in the town of Inkhel.

=== 4 July ===
- Russian overnight strikes kill three Palestinians and injured at least five others in the Khan Eshieh refugee camp, with several civilian homes damaged, as was a social services center.

=== 7 July ===
- Amid Russian and Syrian air support, Tiger Forces capture Mallah Farms imposing fire-control over Castello Road. This road is the only supply route to rebel-controlled Aleppo. Heavy fighting inflicts major death toll amongst Islamists groups. This is part of Northern Aleppo offensive started in late June.

=== 10 July ===
- The President of France Francois Hollande called for international military action against Al Nusra Front, arguing that “We (International Coalition) must also avoid a situation whereby as ISIS becomes weaker, other groups become stronger.”

=== 12 July ===
- As three people are killed in an airstrike destroying a hospital, journalists and activists accuse the Syrian government and its allies of deliberately and repeatedly bombing infrastructure such as bakeries and hospitals. According to the Syrian Network for Human Rights, 80 medical facilities in Syria have been attacked in 2016 and that at least 81 medical workers have been killed in 2016.

=== 16 July ===
- Russian or Syrian government air raids on rebel-held districts of Aleppo city killed at least 25 civilians including children. A hospital in the Maadi neighborhood is hit, wounding some of the staff and patients inside.
- Russian and government air raids on Syria have killed over 50 civilians in the last 3 days, the strikes targeted bakeries and hospitals.

=== 17 July ===
The Syrian Army and its allies capture the only road into the rebel-held eastern Aleppo – a major setback for opposition forces.

=== 19 July ===
- The British-based Syrian Observatory for Human Rights reports U.S.-led coalition airstrikes on the Islamic State-held city of Manbij in northern Syria kills at least 56 civilians, including 11 children, and injure dozens more. Reuters
- The Turkish pilots who downed a Russian Su-24 are arrested in Turkey; according to a Turkish official both were arrested over links to a coup and not because of the downing of the Russian plane.

=== 20 July ===
- Fighters of Harakat Nour al-Din al-Zenki, a CIA-funded rebel group, record themselves beheading a 12 years old Palestinian child named Abdallah Issa. The U.S. State Department declares that, if the video is genuine, they would stop sending the group military aid.

=== 28 July ===
- Syrian government forces complete their encirclement of Aleppo. Assad announces a three-month amnesty for opposition fighters who surrender and lay down their arms.
- The rebel Islamic Group Al-Nusra Front, split from al-Qaeda and changes its name to Jabhat Fateh al-Sham.

=== 30 July ===
- Russia announces the implementation of several humanitarian corridors for civilians to escape from rebel-held areas of Aleppo towards government territory ahead of a planned Syrian Russian offensive. The Syrian government also offered amnesty to opposition fighters who will surrender.

== August 2016 ==
=== 1 August ===
- Russian helicopter downed, killing all five on board. It is the worst single incident for Russia since they entered the civil war. Idlib rebels were filmed desecrating the bodies of the crew of the helicopter stripping their uniforms and showing the wreckage of the Mil Mi-8.

=== 2 August ===
- An apparent chlorine chemical-attack by government forces hits Saraqeb in Idlib Governorate; about thirty people are injured. The site of the attack is near where the Russian helicopter was downed, though it is not apparent whether this is coincidental.

=== 3 August ===
- Jihadi group Jabhat Asala wa-Tanmiya splits from the US-backed New Syrian Army, though says it will continue to fight Islamic State in eastern Syria.

=== 10 August ===
- An alleged chemical revenge-attack by government forces takes place in the Zubdiya neighbourhood of rebel-held Aleppo; three or four people are killed.

=== 14 August ===
- A suicide bombing killed over 50 rebel fighters at the Syrian Atme crossing with Turkey, the attack left over 50 rebels wounded as well as Turkish Army soldiers injured.

=== 17 August ===
After capturing most of the 1070 Al-Hamdaniyah Housing Project, government forces also stormed the Air Force Technical Base. The former government commander of the base Brig. Gen. Deeb Bazi was killed as he led the assault. Back-and-forth fighting at the Academy continued into early September, when on 4 September, pro-government forces finally overwhelmed the rebel defenders and captured the whole complex. Thus, government troops reestablished the siege of rebel-held areas of Aleppo.

=== 26 August ===
- Rebel fighters from Daraya (Damascus countryside) surrender their positions to SAA forces in honor of an agreement which granted them pass to Idlib Governorate. Over 700 fighters and their families are allowed to leave Daraya by Syrian Government forces.

=== 30 August ===
- Jund al-Aqsa, Jaish al Ezza and the Free Syrian Army have captured the town of Soran and a number of villages in the vicinity in the northern Hama province from government forces.
