= Timeline of the Syrian civil war (May–August 2017) =

Syrian Civil war

The following is a timeline of the Syrian Civil War from May to August 2017. Information about aggregated casualty counts is found at Casualties of the Syrian Civil War.

== May ==
=== 2 May ===
- At peace talks in Astana, the presidents of the Russian Federation and Turkey announced their support for the creation of "safe zones" in Syria. Representatives of the Syrian rebels walked out of a press conference on the talks in protest at the inclusion of the Islamic Republic of Iran in the deal.

=== 5 May ===
- Lebanese Army reports capture of Muhammad Hassan Hasweh, who it describes as a senior Tahrir al-Sham commander, in the frontier town of Arsal.
- The Russian delegation at the Astana talks announced that the "safe zone" (or "de-escalation zone") agreement sponsored by Russia, Iran and Turkey - covering four areas, in the Idlib Governorate, the northern rebel-controlled parts of the Homs Governorate, the rebel-controlled eastern Ghouta, and the Badia region - would come into effect at 12:00 P.M. Damascus Time. Neither the rebels nor the main Syrian Kurdish party, the Democratic Union Party (Syria) (PYD), recognised the zones.

The U.S.-led coalition bombs an ISIL-controlled wellhead near Mayadin, 6 May 2017

=== 9 May ===
- Relocation begins of Tahrir al-Sham and other rebel fighters, family members and supporters from Qaboun, Barzeh and Tishreen in the Damascus suburbs to Idlib Governorate
- The Trump administration approved a plan to arm the Syrian Democratic Forces, despite opposition from Turkey. The move aimed to help the SDF capture Raqqa from the Islamic State of Iraq and the Levant.

=== 10 May ===
- SDF forces have completed the capture of the town of Tabqa and the adjacent Tabqa Dam from Islamic State forces.

=== 16 May ===
- A U.S.-led Coalition bombing kills 42 civilians in al-Bokamal city, including 11 children and 6 women.

=== 22 May ===
- Dozens of rebels are killed or wounded by an Islamic State bombing of Ahrar al-Sham headquarters in a village east of Saraqeb in Idlib Province in northwest Syria.

=== 26 May ===
- A U.S.-led Coalition bombing reportedly kills over 108 civilians in Mayadin.
- Syrian government forces retake the Damascus–Palmyra highway from ISIL.

== June 2017 ==
=== 5 June ===
- Government forces and allies captured areas of Al-‘Alb, Bi’r Dahlon and Sharat Dahlon in Eastern Homs Governorate from ISIL. They reported to have captured over 6,000 km^{2} of ISIL-held territory.

=== 6 June ===
- SDF started the fifth phase of the campaign to capture Raqqa.

=== 10 June ===
- The Syrian government announced it had captured over 20,000 km^{2} of territory.
- Two FSA commanders are killed in the city of Daraa.

=== 18 June ===
- A U.S. F/A-18E Super Hornet shoots down a Syrian Arab Air Force Su-22 warplane after it allegedly dropped bombs near Kurdish-led Syrian Democratic Forces (SDF) fighters in Raqqa Governorate, according to United States Central Command.
- The first aid convoy in eight months to Harasta in besieged rebel-held eastern Ghouta, jointly organized by the International Committee of the Red Cross, the Syrian Arab Red Crescent and the United Nations, came under fire from pro-government forces, thwarting the humanitarian mission. Airstrikes also intensified in the eastern Ghouta as the 2017 Jobar offensive began.

=== 20 June ===
- The Australian Department of Defense reported that the Royal Australian Air Force (RAAF) halted its aerial military involvement in Syria.
- CNN reported that a U.S. F-16 shot down an Iranian-made drone near al-Tanf.

=== 21 June ===
- The Royal Australian Air Force announced a resumption of military air operations in Syria.

=== 22 June ===
- The United States is sending a civilian team of State Department officials and security team to help stabilise areas that have been captured from ISIL by American-backed forces.

=== 24 June ===
- Israeli airforce attacks Syrian government positions in the Quneitra province after fighting between rebels and the Syrian government spilled over the Israeli controlled Golan Heights.

=== 30 June ===
- The Syrian Observatory of Human Rights reports that the Islamic State withdrew from Aleppo province

== July 2017 ==
=== 1 July ===
- Syrian Army forces fully recaptures the quarries area west of Baath City in Quneitra reversing all rebel gains during the offensive.

=== 4 July ===
- A fifth round of talks organized by Russia, Turkey and Iran takes place in Astana, Kazakhstan discussing the implementation of safe zones in Syria.

=== 11 July ===
The Syrian Observatory of Human rights confirm the death of Abu Bakr al-Baghdadi, the Caliph of the Islamic State and the Levant.

=== 13 July ===
An improvised device blast an Arab Socialist Ba'ath Party – Syria Region building in Al-Baroon Street, Aleppo. The attack left the Secretary Fadil Najar killed and five other people were wounded in the blast.

=== 14 July ===
- Syrian Arab Army claims that Free Syrian Army commander of Regiment 107 is killed by a roadside bomb planted by the SAA in Daraa.
- Reports suggest the FSA and Tahrir al-Sham (HTS) in Southern Syria reject the US-Russia ceasefire.

=== 23 July ===
- According to the Syrian Observatory for Human Rights, the Syrian government carried out several airstrikes in Eastern Ghouta, in violation of the cessation of hostilities it had declared on the previous day.

=== 24 July ===
- The Russian General Staff announced the introduction of new "de-escalation zones" in Syria, including in the north of the city of Homs and in East Ghouta region.

=== 26 July ===
- A FSA military commander of the Syrian Revolutionaries Front, Bashair al-Numairi, is targeted and killed by an IED at the road between the towns of Zimrin and Um Al-Uosaj in northern Daraa, according to a pro-government source.

=== 29 July ===
- The Islamic State of Iraq and the Levant loses 6,000 square kilometers during the first month of the 4th year of its creation. Over 5,635 square kilometers are lost to government forces and the rest to SDF forces, according to the Syrian Observatory for Human Rights.

=== 31 July ===
- According to the Syrian Network for Human Rights, the Syrian government dropped 244 barrel bombs in July, in the "de-escalation zones", targeting Daraa governorate, the Damascus suburbs, Suwayda, Hama and Homs.

== August 2017 ==
=== 3 August ===
- The Syrian government shells rebel towns in Eastern Ghouta: Ein Tarma town targeted with 10 ground-to-ground local FIL missiles, killing a woman and child and wounding others; and four people are wounded when the city of Harasta is shelled with mortars.

=== 4 August ===
- Nearly 8,000 Syrian refugees and fighters arrived in rebel-held central Syria from Lebanon as part of a ceasefire deal between Hezballah and Fateh al-Sham.

=== 9 August ===
- Syrian government shelling killed five civilians and wounded 10 more in the town of Kafr Batna.

=== 10 August ===
- Syrian government forces bombed two areas in Tal Dahab village near Houla town in “de-escalation zones”, killing least four people, while captured at least 30km border with Jordan from rebel control.
- A woman, a man and a child were killed, and seven more people were wounded in shelling on a town of Hammuriyeh in the Eastern Ghouta area near the capital, Damascus.

=== 27 August ===
- A Bulgarian newspaper published a report that appeared to show that Eastern European-made weapons supplied by the United States, Saudi Arabia and the UAE reached the hands of militants and terror groups in the Middle East via 350 diplomatic flights on Azerbaijan's Silk Way Airlines.

=== 28 August ===
- Former US ambassador to Syria Robert Ford said that Syrian President Assad's victory in Syria and the Iranian role in the region are realities.
- ISIL forces agree to withdrawal from Qalamoun to Abu Kamal in Iblid, and 600 are bused under Syrian army escort into ISIL-controlled territory in a deal negotiated by Hezbollah, thus allowing Lebanese and Syrian Forces to gain control of their borders in the first time since six years. The transfer deal is met with objections in Iraq and Lebanon, including condemnation from the Iraqi prime minister.
- Two SDF commanders defected to the Syrian Arab Army, both leaders were part of the Northern Sun Battalion, according to a Syrian military source.
