= Timeline of the Syrian civil war (January–April 2017) =

The following is a timeline of the Syrian Civil War from January to April 2017. Information about aggregated casualty counts is found at Casualties of the Syrian Civil War.

== January 2017 ==
=== 2 January ===
- Syrian opposition halted peace negotiations in Astana, Kazakhstan, citing multiple government ceasefire violations.

=== 3 January ===
- Syrian Army forces seize the Air Defense Battalion Base, near Hazrama, from Jaysh al-Islam militants in the Eastern Ghouta region of rural Damascus, during a counter-attack to the Islamist offensive.

=== 7 January ===
Over 60 are killed and 50 are injured in the January 2017 Azaz bombing.

=== 9 January ===
- Syrian media and U.S.-based journalists report that a special operation was carried out by U.S. forces in Deir ez-Zor Governorate. The operation took place between Kabr village and Jazra town, and some ISIL fighters were captured.

=== 19 January ===
- US airstrikes struck the former Syrian Army Sheikh Suleiman military base in western Aleppo now used by Jabhat Fatah al-Sham and the Nour al-Din al-Zenki Movement, killing more than 76 al-Qaeda fighters, including Abu Hasan al-Taftanaz, a senior leader. More than 150 AQ members were killed by US airstrikes in the first three weeks of January.

=== 21 January ===
- According to government officials, Hay'at Tahrir al-Sham rebels were beginning to negotiate their surrender at two eastern Damascus suburbs.

=== 29 January ===
The Syrian Army took full control of Wadi Barada. Maintenance workers were sent by the government to fix the Al-Fijeh Springs thus restoring the water supply to 5 million people who reside in Greater Damascus.

== February 2017 ==
=== 23 February ===
- Israel cancels a plan to accept 100 Syrian child refugees due to opposition within its government.

=== 24 February ===
- The Turkish Free Syrian Army forces, as a part of Operation Euphrates Shield, took full control of the city of al-Bab. SAA and SDF forces seize other towns from ISIS control in the Aleppo countryside.

== March 2017 ==
=== 1 March ===
- Establishment of the Arima buffer zone along part of the border between the SDF-aligned Manbij Military Council and the Free Syrian Army (FSA) forces within the Turkish occupied zone.

=== 2 March ===
- The Syrian Army with Russian support recaptures Palmyra from ISIS forces. ISIL seized the city from government forces in early December 2016 during a sudden offensive.

=== 9 March ===
- U.S. Marine units began to deploy at Northern Syria District of Raqqa Governorate in as part of operations to help SDF forces take control of Raqqa from ISIL.

=== 17 March ===
- In a border incident, the Syrian Arab Army launched anti-aircraft interceptor missiles, which targeted Israeli jets on the Israeli-controlled side of the Golan Heights prompting Israeli anti-missile response, as Syrian Army accused Israel of allegedly striking targets on Syrian territories near Palmyra. Syrian Army claimed it intercepted 2 Israeli jets, while shooting down one and causing damage to the other, while Israel denied. Remains of the anti-aircraft missiles fell in North Jordan.

=== 21 March ===
Tahrir al-Sham launched an offensive on Hama Governorate with the aim of reaching Hama city. other Rebel offensives are countered by the SAA forces at Jobar (Damascus).

=== 22 March ===
Hundreds of SDF soldiers are airlifted by United States across the Euphrates to begin their advance to capture Tabqa Dam and cut off ISIS reinforcements from Raqqa.

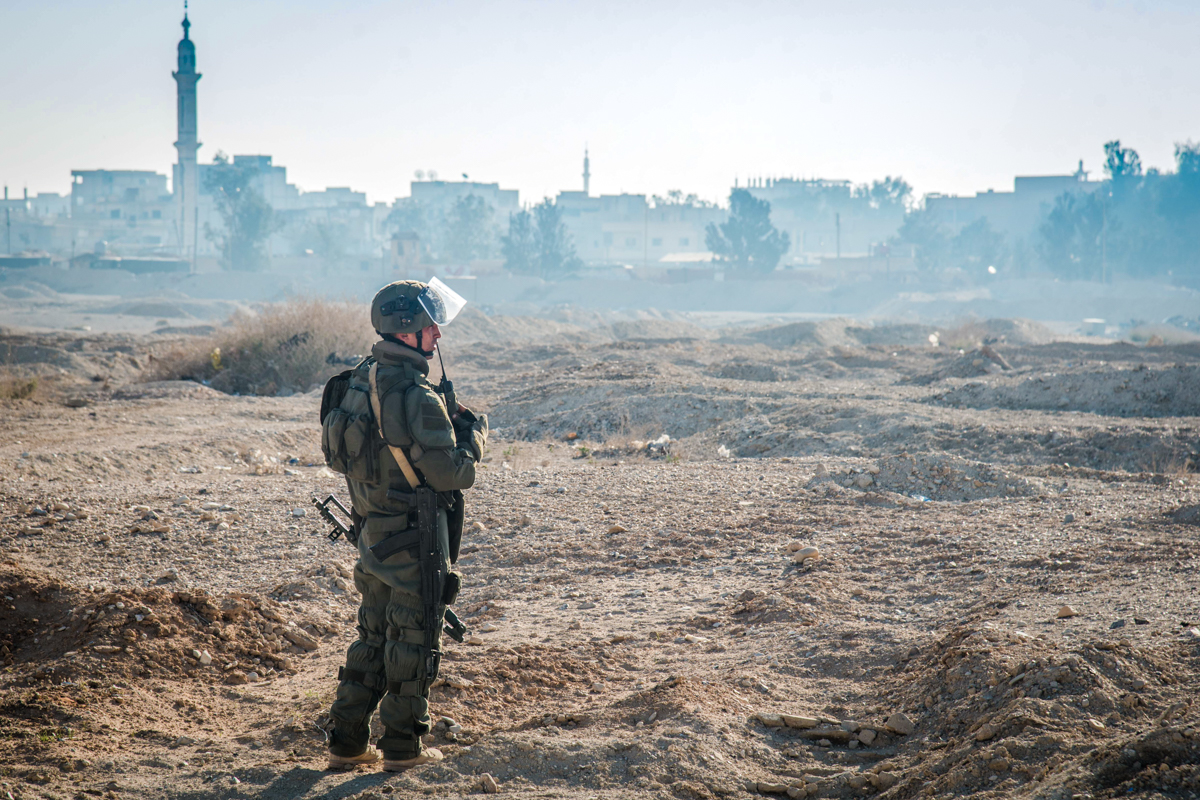
A Russian sapper in Palmyra, 28 March 2017

=== 29 March ===
- The government of the Islamic Republic of Iran and Qatar reach a deal to allow civilians and combatants to leave the besieged towns of Al-Fou’aa-Kafrayain, Madaya and Al-Zabadan in Idlib and Damascus governorates.
- Syrian Forces capture Deir Hafer in Eastern Aleppo according to an Army source.
- Turkey announces the end of its military operations in Syria, concluding Operation Euphrates Shield.

== April 2017 ==
=== 4 April ===
- The town of Khan Shaykhun came under a heavy air attack, allegedly involving chemical weapons, resulting in up to 100 deaths.

=== 7 April ===
- Facilities and aircraft at the Syrian government's Shayrat Airbase are hit by 59 Tomahawk cruise missiles launched from the Arleigh Burke-class guided-missile destroyers USS Porter and USS Ross in the Eastern Mediterranean. The U.S. claimed the strike was in response to intelligence that the 4 April Khan Shaykhun attack was conducted by the Syrian military. It was the first unilateral military action by the United States that directly targeted the Syrian government.

=== 12 April ===
The Syrian Army expands the buffer zone around Palmyra by capturing more than 230 square miles of territory around the city

=== 19 April ===
- Pro-government media announce that west Damascus district of Zabadani is declared free of "militants" by the regime after the departure of 1,000 rebels and their families, and that Syrian army forces entered the town for the first time since the beginning of the Civil War.
