= 1971 Egyptian Federation of Arab Republics referendum =

A referendum on the Federation of Arab Republics was held in Egypt on 1 September 1971, alongside simultaneous referendums in Libya and Syria. It was approved by 99.96% of voters, with a turnout of 98.1%.

== Results ==
Choice	Votes	%
For	7,770,962	99.96
Against	1,363	0.04
Invalid/blank votes	2,471	–
Total	7,776,837	100
Registered voters/turnout	7,925,297	98.13
Source: Direct Democracy
