= 1971 Libyan Federation of Arab Republics referendum =

1 September 1971

Results
Choice	Votes	%
Yes	477,490	98.68%
No	6,376	1.32%
Valid votes	483,866	99.92%
Invalid or blank votes	365	0.08%
Total votes	484,231	100.00%
Registered voters/turnout	511,803	94.61%

A referendum on the Federation of Arab Republics was held in Libya on 1 September 1971, alongside simultaneous referendums in Egypt and Syria. The referendum was an attempt by Muammar Gaddafi to merge Libya, Egypt and Syria into a unified Arab state.

The referendum was approved by 98.6% of voters, with a turnout of 94.6%.

== Results ==
Choice	Votes	%
For	477,490	98.61
Against	6,741	1.39
Total	484,231	100.00
Valid votes	484,231	99.92
Invalid/blank votes	365	0.08
Total votes	484,596	100.00
Registered voters/turnout	511,803	94.68
Source: Direct Democracy
