= Timeline of the Syrian civil war (September–December 2016) =

The following is a timeline of the Syrian Civil War from September to December 2016. Information about aggregated casualty counts is found at Casualties of the Syrian Civil War.

== September 2016 ==
=== 1 September ===
- After capturing the Technical College in South Aleppo during the 2016 Aleppo campaign, the Syrian Arab Army (SAA) and Hezbollah entered the Armament School, under Army of Conquest control.
- Rebel forces at Muadamiyat al-Sham agree to surrender to the SAA in exchange for safe passage to rebel-controlled territory, ending the four-year Siege of Darayya and Muadamiyat.

=== 3 September ===
- Syrian government forces recaptured territory previously lost during the rebel offensive in Aleppo that opened a new unsecured corridor via the Ramouseh district

=== 11 September ===
- Multiple airstrikes after the US and Russia announced their plans for a nationwide ceasefire resulted in the deaths of more than 100 civilians and the injury of over 100 more.

=== 15 September ===
- The previously agreed ceasefire is extended, and appears to largely hold, despite violations on both sides. Delivery of aid convoys continues to be hampered.

=== 17 September ===
- On 17 September 2016, US airplanes struck a target of Dayr Az Zawr. Centcom declared that they halted airstrikes when they were informed by Russian officials that the target hit by US airplanes may have been a Syrian Arab Army target. The Syrian Arab News Agency said that an ISIS assault on the Syrian Army began right after the US airstrike.

== October 2016 ==
=== 9 October ===
- Syrian Arab Army offensive on the rebel held parts of Eastern Aleppo, seize 15-20% of it.

=== 16 October ===
- Dabiq offensive: Turkish-backed rebels capture the symbolically important town of Dabiq from the Islamic State group.

=== 18 October ===
- Russian Aerospace Forces and Syrian Government military stopped airstrikes on rebels targets in Aleppo, Damascus, Hama and Latakia regions in accordance to an 8-hour cease fire.
- Belgian airstrikes in Syria kills 6 civilians by error.

=== 19 October ===
- Hundreds of armed rebel fighters evacuate Mu'addamiyat, after an agreement with Government Forces. Leaving the town to Government control.

=== 24 October ===
- After failed negotiations in Eastern Ghouta between Jaysh al-Islam rebels and Government officials, the SAA renewed their offensive at Al-Reyhan Western Farms.
- The Russian sponsored 24 hour ceasefire reported over 44 violations according to the Russian Center for Reconciliation of the Warring Parties in Syria.

=== 25 October ===
- Jund al-Aqsa militants behead a rival militant leader(Sham Legion) in Idlib Governorate.

=== 26 October ===
The Syrian Air Force killed a Free Syrian Army Chief of Staff in the Homs region, Colonel Shouki Ayyoub was killed alongside 5 rebels in the town of Al-Rastan.

== November 2016 ==
=== 3 November ===
A Russian helicopter is destroyed by an ISIS missile on land, after it was downed by technical reasons. Both Russian crew members escaped the attack.

=== 8 November ===
According to a retired Brigadier General of the Lebanese Army, the Syrian Army with Russian support could capture Rebel held Eastern Aleppo in less than 3 months.

Jabhat Fateh al-Sham rebels in Idlib Governorate accused the United States Air Force of targeting one of their bases and killing 10 fighters.

A Russian Foreign Ministry official stated that over 6,000 armed militants are engaged in the operation to break through Eastern Aleppo.

=== 11 November ===
During a summit of Pacific leaders in Peru, U.S President Barack Obama expressed his belief that Syrian Army would take the Eastern side of Aleppo from Rebel and Jihadist Forces. He also expressed doubts in short term prospects in Syria.

=== 12 November ===
Syrian Armed Forces recapture Minyan industrial district from rebels in East Aleppo, thus recapturing all the territory lost in the last rebel offensive.

=== 24 November ===
Syrian Arab Air Force conducted an airstrike against Turkish Special Operations Forces and aligned Turkish-backed rebels north of al-Bab, killing three Turkish soldiers and injuring ten.

=== 27 November ===
A Syrian air strike in Homs region targeted a high-ranking Ahrar Al-Sham meeting, killing 5 insurgents, meanwhile Israeli aircraft raided ISIS positions killing 4 militants in response of an ISIS affiliate ("Yarmouk Martyrs Brigade") attack on an Israeli checkpoint in the Golan Heights.

== December 2016 ==
=== 5 December ===
The Russian Federation and China vetoed a UN Security Council resolution seeking a humanitarian pause in Aleppo city. Two Russian medics were killed in Eastern Aleppo by jihadist shelling on a Russian field military hospital, the attack was condemned with harsh remarks by Russia's Defense Ministry spokesman Major General Igor who blamed the US, UK and France as "sponsors of terrorism".

=== 6 December ===
The Syrian army captures two-thirds of the rebel-held part of Aleppo, during its offensive to seize all the Eastern Suburbs. meanwhile the Russian Foreign Minister expressed that Syrian rebels who refuse to accept the US-Russia deal would be considered "terrorists" and would be eliminated.

=== 11 December ===
Palmyra (Tadmur) was captured by ISIS from the Syrian Arab Army control. The SAA withdrew south of the city leaving the airport still under their control but surrounded by ISIS troops.

=== 12 December ===
Syrian Army forces had gained control of 98% of the formerly rebel-held east Aleppo, meanwhile rebels were reportedly "near defeat".

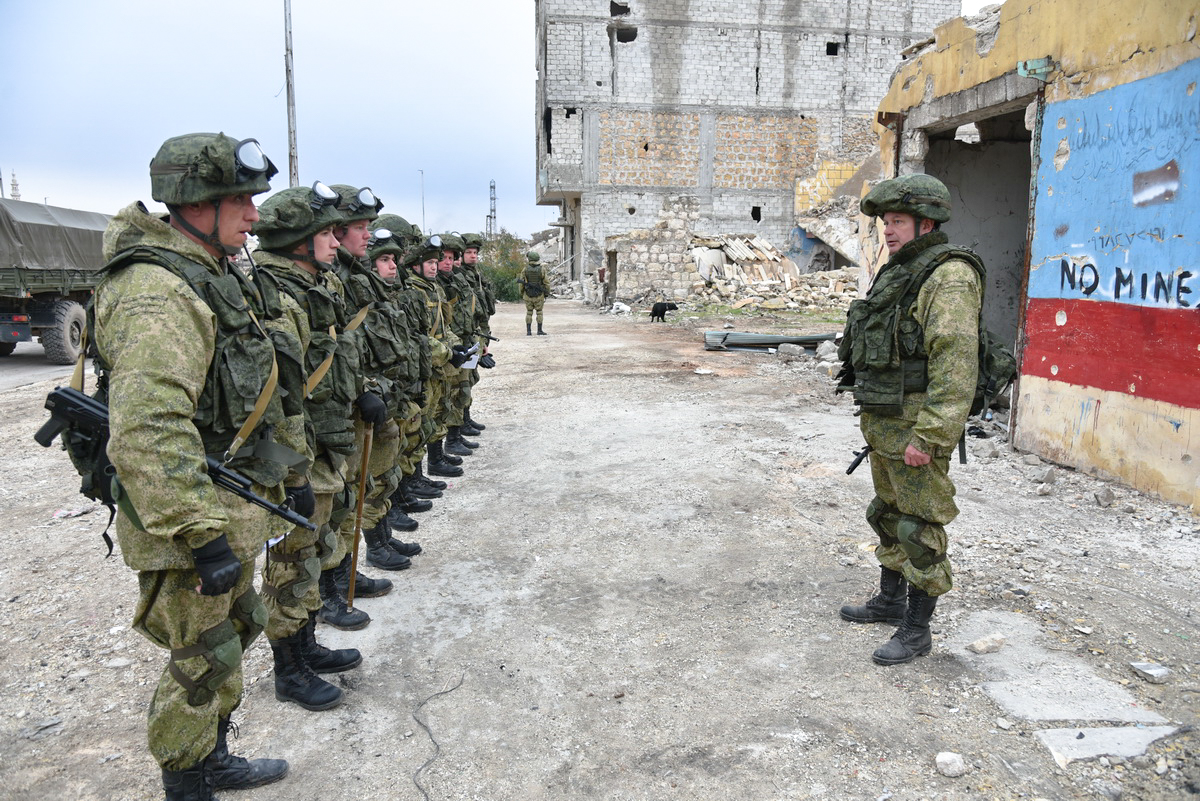
Sappers from Russia's International Mine Action Center prepare for demining operations in Aleppo, 18 December 2016

=== 19 December ===
Over 50 buses carrying militants and civilians leave the besieged Eastern Aleppo and arrives to Rashideen in Western Aleppo countryside. Among those evacuated was Bana a Syrian seven year old famous twitter which became famous for their updates regarding the live in Eastern Aleppo.

=== 21 December ===
14 Turkish soldiers were killed and more than 33 were wounded in clashes with ISIS militants near the northern Syrian town of al-Bab.

=== 22 December ===
Syrian Army announces the capture of Eastern Aleppo and the complete withdrawal of rebels and civilians. The Red Cross later confirmed that the evacuation of all civilians and rebels was complete.

=== 23 December ===
The Islamic State of Iraq and the Levant executed two Turkish soldiers captured during the Turkish military intervention in Syria by burning them alive.

=== 29 December ===
Syrian opposition and Government delegations agree on talks to achieve a cease fire at Wadi Barada, Jabhat Fateh Al-Sham rebels and Free Syrian Army would be given free passage to Idlib Governorate in exchange of the rebel surrender of Wadi Barada in West Damascus. If so Al-Zabadani and Madaya would be isolated and could be used by the Syrian Government to press for another ceasefire and evacuation.
