= Farouk al-Sharaa =

Syrian politician and diplomat (born 1938)

- فاروق الشرع
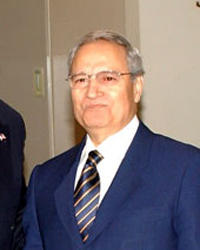
- Sharaa in 2004

Vice President of Syria
- In office 21 February 2006 – 19 July 2014 Serving with Najah al-Attar
- President: Bashar al-Assad
- Preceded by: Zuhair Masharqa; Abdul Halim Khaddam
- Succeeded by: Najah al-Attar

Minister of Foreign Affairs
- In office 1 March 1984 – 21 February 2006
- President: Hafez al-Assad; Bashar al-Assad
- Preceded by: Abdul-Halim Khaddam
- Succeeded by: Walid Muallem

Member of the Central Command of the Ba'ath Party
- In office 21 June 2000 – 8 July 2013

Personal details
- Born: 10 December 1938 (age 87) Daraa, Syria
- Party: Ba'ath Party
- Education: University of London; University of Damascus

Farouk al-Sharaa (Note: Arabic: فاروق الشرع) (born 10 December 1938) is a Syrian politician and diplomat. He was one of the most prominent officials in the government of Ba'athist Syria and served as foreign minister from 1984 to 2006, then as vice president until 2013.

== Early life and education ==
Sharaa was born in Daraa on 10 December 1938 to a Sunni Muslim family that originates from the Daraa Governorate. He studied English language at the University of Damascus in the 1960s, earning a Bachelor of Arts degree in English Literature in 1963. In 1971 and 1972 he took courses in international law at the University of London.

== Early career (1963–1989) ==
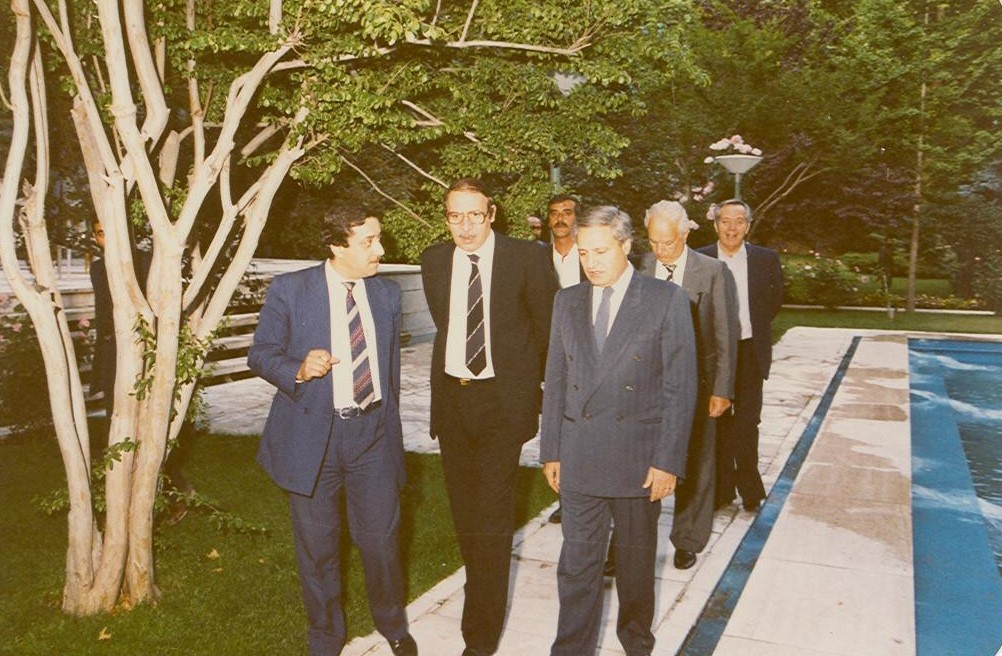
Mahmoud Al-Zoubi in the middle between Nizar Daoudi and Farouk al-Sharaa, in Tehran condoling the death of Imam Khomeini, 1989.

In 1963, Sharaa became a member of the Ba'ath Party’s central committee. He served as regional manager of the state-run Syrian Arab Airlines in London from 1968 to 1972 and as commercial director in Damascus from 1972 to 1976. Between 1977 and 1980, he served as Syria's ambassador to Italy. In 1980, he was named deputy foreign minister. In 1984, Sharaa was appointed as acting minister of information. In March 1984, Hafez al-Assad, then president of Syria, named him Minister of Foreign Affairs.

== Old guard of the Assad government (1990–2000) ==
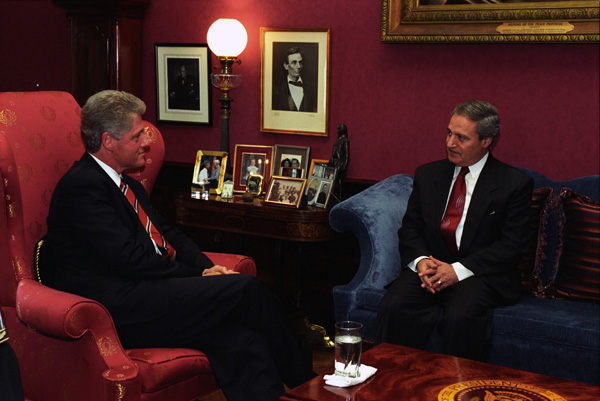
Foreign Minister Farouk al-Sharaa meeting with the US President Bill Clinton in White House in 1993.

Sharaa has remained an old guard of the Assad administration. He has been very active in negotiating with many countries to gain better relations for Syria. Much of this negotiation has involved Syria's relationships with Lebanon and Israel. Sharaa maintains that Israel should give back all of the Golan Heights, the territory it took from Syria in the 1967 War. Between 1991 and 1993 he led negotiations in the Barcelona Process and with the US Presidents George H. W. Bush and Bill Clinton.

He was involved in two attempts to negotiate a reconciliation with Israel in December 1999, when he held a meeting with Ehud Barak and Bill Clinton in White House, with the goal of resuming Israeli–Syrian peace negotiations that were stalled since early 1996. The peace talks summit continued until January 2000 in Shepherdstown, West Virginia, but never materialized.

== Under Bashar al-Assad (2000–2011) ==
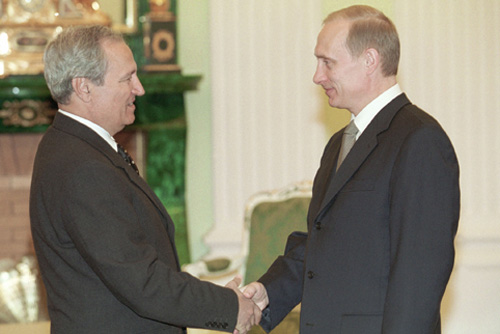
Foreign Minister Farouk al-Sharaa meeting with President of Russia Vladimir Putin in Kremlin in 2001.

After Hafez al-Assad's death in June 2000, his son Bashar al-Assad reshuffled his cabinet several times to remove several long-time members. Sharaa, however, remained in office, and became one of the longest-serving foreign ministers in the world. It was believed that Sharaa might be forced to resign when, in October 2005, he was accused of misleading international investigators in letters about the investigation of possible Syrian involvement in the assassination of former Lebanese prime minister Rafik Hariri. Along with President Bashar al-Assad, Sharaa was interviewed in April 2006 during the course of a UN investigation into the death in February 2005 of former Lebanese Prime Minister Rafik Hariri.

He finally did leave his post as foreign minister on 11 February 2006, when he became vice president of Syria in charge of foreign affairs. This position had been vacant for a year since the departure of Abdul Halim Khaddam. Some saw his appointment as vice president as a demotion, since he was expected to have less of a public role in Syrian politics and to lose contact with many diplomats and world leaders. The vice president in Syria is generally a ceremonial role. However, others believed that Sharaa would now have a greater role in decision-making, since he would be in Syria more often. In the event, Sharaa engaged in high-profile foreign travel as vice president, indicating that his role is envisaged as an active one on the international scene. He will also become the acting president of Syria if President Assad resigns or dies while Sharaa is still vice president.

Sharaa met with Pope Benedict XVI in September 2007 to discuss the plight of Iraqi Christian refugees in Syria, the Mideast peace processes, and the role and status of the Church in Syria. After 2011, Sharaa was the chairman of the "national dialogue" committee in Syria. In 2000 Sharaa was also appointed to the Ba'ath party's leadership and his term ended in July 2013. On 19 July 2014, his term in the Vice President office ended. After that, he disappeared from sight for a long period, whether politically or on a personal level, with the emergence of rumors of his defection, only to return and appear in October 2018 with the Syrian poet residing in Tunisia Hadi Daniel.

== Syrian civil war (2011–2024) ==
After the outbreak of the Syrian revolution in 2011, Sharaa was seen as a possible replacement for Assad during a transitional period. UN–Arab League Joint Special Representative for Syria Kofi Annan's transition plan included Sharaa as a transitional president until elections were held.

Sharaa's absence from a July 2012 meeting between Bashar al-Assad and Annan led to reports he was under house arrest or had fled to Jordan. However, Sharaa represented Bashar al-Assad at the funerals of three senior officials assassinated on 18 July 2012 in Damascus.

== After the fall of the Assad regime ==
Following the fall of the Assad regime in December 2024 and the establishment of the Syrian transitional government under former Hay'at Tahrir al-Sham leader Ahmed al-Sharaa, Farouk accepted an invitation from al-Sharaa to attend a forthcoming national dialogue conference in Damascus. However, he ultimately did not appear among those who took part in the Syrian National Dialogue Conference in February 2025.

== Personal life ==
While some reports said that Hussein al-Sharaa and Farouk al-Sharaa are related, this fact is denied by MENA Research Center. In August 2025, Hussein said on SyriaTV that the Al-Sharaa family in Daraa, to which former Syrian Vice President Farouk al-Sharaa belongs, has no direct kinship ties, but he pointed to an ancient lineage dating back to the 1930s.

== Works ==
In 2015, al-Sharaa published in Arabic his memoirs, titled The Missing Account.

== Notes ==
Political offices
Preceded by Abdul Halim Khaddam	Minister of Foreign Affairs; 1984–2006	Succeeded by Walid Muallem
Preceded by Abdul Halim Khaddam	First Vice President of Syria; 2006–2014	Succeeded by Najah al-Attar
