= 1971 Syrian Federation of Arab Republics referendum =

- 1 September 1971

Results
Choice	Votes	%
Yes	1,748,582	96.44%
No	64,623	3.56%
Valid votes	1,813,205	100.00%
Invalid or blank votes	0	0.00%
Total votes	1,813,205	100.00%
Registered voters/turnout	2,021,405	89.7%

A referendum on the Federation of Arab Republics (Arabic: استفتاء اتحاد الجمهوريات العربية السوري 1971) was held in Syria on 1 September 1971, alongside simultaneous referendums in Egypt and Libya. It was approved by 96.4% of voters, with a turnout of 89.7%.

== Results ==
Choice	Votes	%
For	1,748,582	96.4
Against	64,623	3.6
Invalid/blank votes		–
Total	1,813,205	100
Registered voters/turnout	2,021,405	89.70
Source: Direct Democracy
