= Hadiya Khalaf Abbas =

Syrian politician (1958–2021)

- هدیة خلف عباس
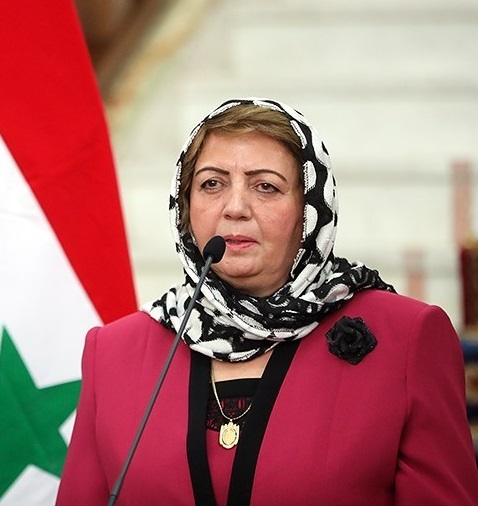
- Abbas in 2016

Speaker of the People's Assembly of Syria
- In office 6 June 2016 – 20 July 2017
- President: Bashar al-Assad
- Preceded by: Mohammad Jihad al-Laham
- Succeeded by: Hammouda Sabbagh

Member of the Central Command of the Ba'ath Party
- In office 22 April 2017 – 13 November 2021

Personal details
- Born: 1958 Deir ez-Zor Governorate, Syria
- Died: 13 November 2021 (aged 62–63) Deir ez-Zor, Ba'athist Syria
- Party: Ba'ath Party
- Education: University of Aleppo

Hadiya Khalaf Abbas (Arabic: هدیة خلف عباس, 1958 – 13 November 2021) was a Syrian politician who served as the Speaker of the People's Council of Syria from June 2016 to July 2017. She was the only woman to have held the post.

== Biography and career ==
Abbas was born in Deir ez-Zor Governorate in 1958 and got a doctorate in agricultural engineering from the University of Aleppo. She was also professor at the Al-Furat University.

After the 2016 Syrian parliamentary election, Abbas was elected Speaker of the People's Council of Syrian in the first session of the chamber on 6 June 2016, becoming the first woman to reach this office. She won uncontested.

On 20 July 2017, Syria's Parliament issued a resolution discharging Abbas from her post as Speaker, with a majority of member votes. Abbas was accused by some parliamentarians of "preventing some members from submitting their interposition and turning a blind eye to their willingness to discuss a number of articles according to the constitutional rules," a behavior other parliamentarians described as "irresponsible and illegal." Deputy Speaker was appointed interim speaker until the voting of Hammouda Sabbagh as Abbas' successor took place on 28 September 2017.

Abbas died on 13 November 2021, at the Military Hospital of Deir ez-Zor at the age of 63 after suffering a heart attack.
