= Syrian Network for Human Rights =

Monitoring group focused on Syria

- الشبكة السورية لحقوق الإنسان
- Abbreviation: SNHR
- Founded: June 2011
- Founder: Fadel Abdul Ghany
- Type: NGO
- Purpose: Human rights
- Board of directors: Fadel Abdul Ghany (chairman); Burhan Ghalioun; Bettahar Bojlal; Hassan Okour; Hamza al Mustafa
- Website: snhr.org

The Syrian Network for Human Rights (SNHR, Arabic: الشبكة السورية لحقوق الإنسان) is a UK-based human rights NGO, which monitors casualties and has briefed various United Nations agencies. It monitors Syrian casualties of all the parties in the Syrian civil war. The SNHR was founded in June 2011 by Fadel Abdul Ghany, who is the chairman of the board of directors. Members have been detained, and many now live outside Syria.

Its reports have been cited by various news media, non-governmental organizations, such as Amnesty International and Human Rights Watch, as well as by the United Nations High Commissioner for Human Rights.

== Notable reports ==
As of May 2019, according to the SNHR, nearly 128,000 people had never emerged from Bashar al-Assad's secret network of prisons – and nearly 14,000 were killed under torture.

SNHR supplied key data for a report done by The Washington Post in June 2019 detailing the reported arrests of around 2,000 Syrian refugees who had been "detained after returning to Syria during the past two years".

SNHR documented six media workers killed in Syria in December 2024, saying five of them were killed by Assad regime forces and one by the SDF.

In January 2025, during the East Aleppo offensive, the Kurdish-led and US-backed Syrian Democratic Forces (SDF) accused SNHR of falsely attributing three deaths in Al-Qashla village southeast of Manbij to the SDF, which the SDF attributed to Turkish-backed forces, alleging that the SNHR's information sharing is directed by Turkey. This came after the SNHR published its December 2024 civilian death report, in which it accused the SDF of killing 108 civilians in the month of December while only attributing 8 civilian deaths to all Syrian opposition forces including the SNA, and 9 civilian deaths to Turkey.

In January 2025, the SNHR documented a total of 24 civilians killed by Turkish and SNA forces. The SNHR's January 2025 report documented the killing of 17 protestors in Turkish airstrikes, alleging that their participation in the protest had been coerced by the SDF, who stationed their forces in civilian areas.

== Methodology and Independence ==
The SNHR is known to keep one of the most rigorous tallies of Syrian citizens forcibly disappeared throughout the conflict in Syria by all sides. SNHR has been widely cited by journalists at major outlets including The Guardian and The New York Times and recognized as rigorous, independent, and credible. Anne Barnard, writing for The New York Times reported that the SNHR's tally, described as the most rigorous, was probably an undercount. Barnard was also asked how the SNHR compiled their figures. She says the reason they were considered the most rigorous and reliably conservative numbers is their numbers were actual counts of reports they received, and they were not extrapolations or estimates. Barnard also said that a death had to be reported by a family member or a direct witness and they did not take third party accounts. She added that they took phone calls and had a form on their website, and then they went through and verified what they could in the detailed report. They also went back and called people listed as possible family members of people who were missing for a long time to find out if they were still missing.

In 2018, The Violations Documentation Center in Syria (VDC) counted nearly 9,500 deaths in detention since 2011, compared to over 13,000 counted by the SNHR. The VDC acknowledged its estimates were more conservative than those of the SNHR and other monitors as its methodology was to only document deaths once information like the name of the victims and the circumstances surrounding their deaths were confirmed.

In 2025, SNHR was criticised by the Syrian Democratic Forces (SDF) for its methodology and perceived affinity for the former Syrian opposition, Turkey, and the Syrian transitional government led by Ahmed al-Sharaa.

In 2025, an investigation published in the crowd-sourced news website Fair Observer concluded that, while the SNHR claims impartiality, it has a history of financial opacity and controversial political affiliation of alleged board members that undermines this claim. The investigation, by Syrian researcher Angie Bittar and Florida-based journalist Jalyssa Dugrot, came in the aftermath of the Assad regime's overthrow, which saw a series of mass killings targeting Alawites and Druze in March and July of 2025, respectively. The journalists noted how the organization's report the March 2025 massacres of Syrian Alawites appeared to avoid attributing responsibility to government forces, and failed to classify the victims as "civilians" (non-combatants), which differed from its other reporting during the conflict. To explain this discrepancy, Bittar and Dugrot argue that the SNHR's methodology does not adequately adhere to international standards for casualty recording established by the High Commissioner for Human Rights (OHCHR) because it fails to provide a clear definition for what constituted civilian status, despite having definitions for other categories such as "media worker" or "detainee" consistent with such standards. The article argues that this leaves room for distinction between civilians and combatant casualties to be opaque. The authors also state that the SNHR's methodology lacks source transparency, standard of proof and "degree of certainty or confidence in given data points", unlike other casualty-recording NGOs like Airwars. Bittar and Dugrot note that the SNHR possessed older, different methodologies now only accessible through web archives, including one from 2016 that defined civilian in terms they say deviated from international standards.

== Governance ==
SNHR is registered as a non-profit limited liability company in the United Kingdom, and a non-profit organization in the United States. It is governed by a board of directors with five members and its executive director manages seven divisions. As of 2019, it has 27 full-time employees as well as over 70 volunteers.

Fair Observer alleges that unlike other established NGOs, the SNHR doesn't publicly list its staff or board of directors in its current website, which starkly contrasts with organizations like Human Rights Watch or Airwars. The investigation notes that the SNHR's list of board of directors was only searchable through internet archives under a former domain in 2017, and that in its decade of tax-exempt status, the organization only filed taxes four times.

The 2017 list of board members for the SNHR included Burhan Ghalioun, a prominent member of the Syrian National Council (SNC) between 2011 and 2012. It also included Hamza al-Mustafa, who was appointed Syria's Minister of Information by President Ahmed al-Sharaa in March 2025. Mustafa also served as the director of Syria TV, a formerly pro-opposition Syrian satellite television outlet part of the Qatari media company Fadaat Media.

SNHR chairman Fadel Abdul Ghany has openly advocated for US and UK military intervention in Syria as a means of protecting civilians on multiple occasions.
