= Casualties of the Syrian civil war =

Casualties of conflict in the Middle East

Human toll of the Syrian civil war
- Pre-war population 22 ±.5; Internally displaced 6 ±.5, Refugees 5.5 ±.5, Fatalities 0.5 ±.1 (millions)

Syrian refugees
- By country: Turkey, Lebanon, Egypt, Jordan
- Settlements: Camps: Jordan

Internally displaced Syrians

Casualties of the war
- Crimes: War crimes, massacres, rape

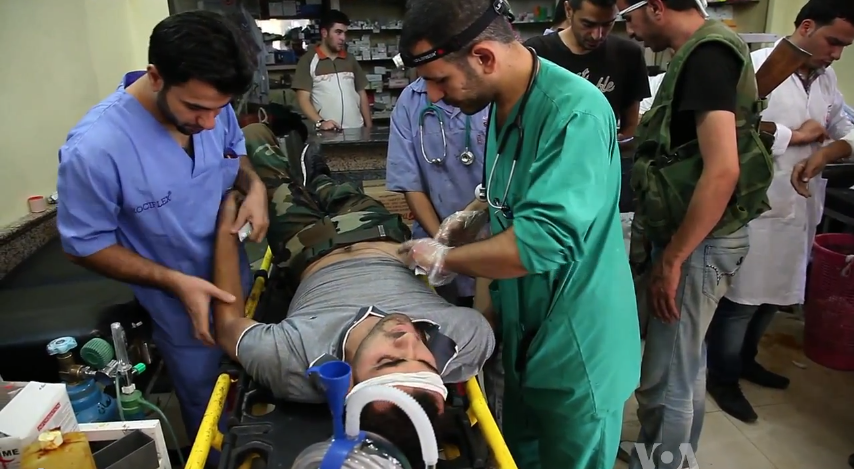
Doctors and medical staff treating injured rebel fighters and civilians in Aleppo

Estimates of the total number of deaths in the Syrian Civil War, by various war monitors, range between 580,000 as of May 2021, and approximately 656,493 as of March 2025. In late September 2021, the United Nations stated it had documented the deaths of at least 350,209 "identified individuals" in the conflict between March 2011 and March 2021, but cautioned the figure was "certainly an under-count" that specified only a "minimum verifiable number".

The most violent year of the conflict was 2014, when around 110,000 people were killed. In April 2016, UN envoy to Syria Staffan de Mistura stated that more than 400,000 people were killed in the Syrian civil war. By mid-March 2025, opposition activist group the Syrian Observatory for Human Rights (SOHR) reported the number of children killed in the conflict had risen to 26,282, and that 16,181 women had also been killed.

On 28 June 2022, the United Nations Human Rights Office (OHCHR) stated that at least 306,887 civilians had been killed in Syria during the conflict between March 2011 and March 2021, representing about 1.5% of the country's pre-war population. This figure did not include indirect and non-civilian deaths. UN's Commission of Inquiry on the Syrian Arab Republic estimated that between 2011 and May 2021, more than 580,000 people were killed; with 13 million Syrians being displaced and 6.7 million refugees forced to flee Syria. Ba'athist government forces reportedly arrested and tortured numerous repatriated refugees, subjecting them to forced disappearances and extrajudicial executions.

As of February 2015, the UNHCR had designated the conflict as the "world's worst humanitarian crisis", while the head of the UNHRC's Commission of Inquiry on Syria stated that the Ba'athist government was responsible for the majority of civilian casualties up to that point. The Syrian Network for Human Rights estimated that between 2011 and 2024, the Ba'athist government and its foreign allies were responsible for approximately 91% of the total civilian casualties.

== Overall deaths ==
All of the following totals include civilians, rebels and government forces:

Source	Casualties	Time period
United Nations	350,209 killed (minimum, identified only)	15 March 2011 – 15 March 2021
GCR2P	580,000 killed (minimum)	15 March 2011 – 31 May 2021
Syrian Observatory for Human Rights	656,493 killed (546,150 conf. by names) (Note: "The Syrian Observatory for Human Rights (SOHR) has documented by names the death of 507,567 people since the outbreak of the Syrian Revolution out of an overall death toll of 617,910 people whose death has been verified by SOHR in the past 13 years." Source:)	15 March 2011 – 15 March 2025

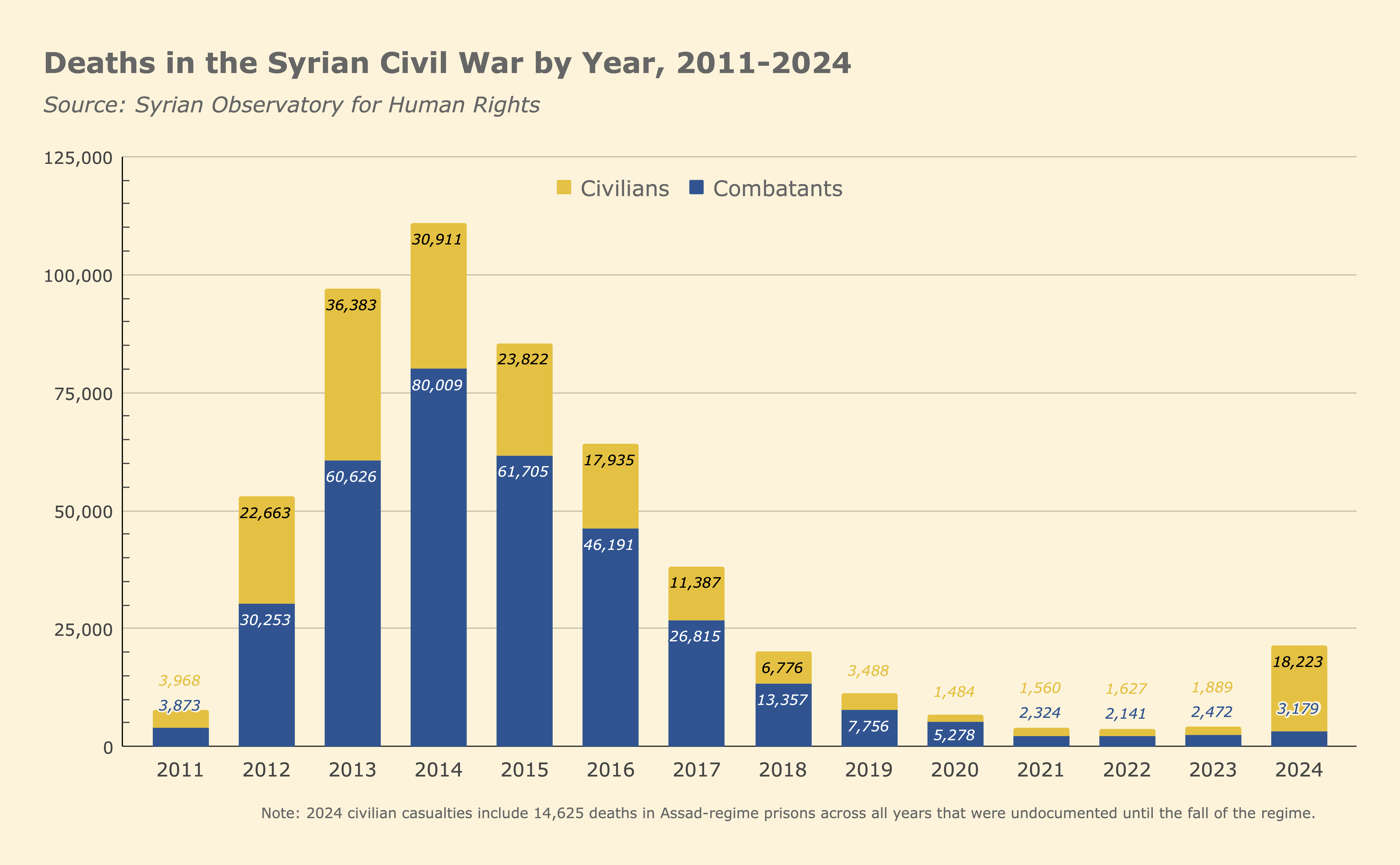
Annual deaths 2011 to 2024

=== Death tolls by time periods ===
The following figures were all compiled by the SOHR which is considered an authoritative source on the matter. The figures are only for documented deaths, while the SOHR estimates another 110,343 undocumented deaths had occurred.

Time period	Combatants	Civilians	Grand total (inc. unidentified)
2011	3,873	3,968	7,841
2012	30,253	22,663	52,916
2013	60,626	36,383	97,009
2014	80,009	30,911	110,920
2015	61,705	23,822	85,527
2016	46,191	17,935	64,126
2017	26,815	11,387	38,202
2018	13,357	6,776	20,133
2019	7,756	3,488	11,244
2020	5,278	1,484	6,762
2021	2,324	1,560	3,884
2022	2,141	1,627	3,825
2023	2,472	1,889	4,361
2024	3,179	18,223	21,402
Total	347,082	199,068	546,150

The following breakdown of combatant fatalities does not include 36,957 pro-government and 25,955 anti-government fighters who were killed sometime between 2011 and 2020, but whose deaths were only documented by the SOHR in 2021.

Time period	Pro-government forces	Anti-government forces
2011	3,138	619
2012	18,928	9,746
2013	30,269	18,914
2014	25,106	32,803
2015	17,668	23,601
2016	14,771	23,431
2017	10,771	14,064
2018	4,522	8,663
2019	2,968	4,727
2020	2,585	2,693
2021	1,069	1,238
2022	844	1,297
2023	1,524	854
2024	1,825	1,273

=== Death tolls by provinces ===
According to the Syrian opposition website Syrian Martyrs, the conflict's documented death toll was 151,888 up to 30 April 2016, which was the time of its last update. The number includes 35,859 rebel combatants but does not include members of the government security forces or pro-government foreign combatants who have died. Early in the conflict, the Syrian Martyrs number of civilian deaths was significantly higher than the ones presented by other organisations, including the UN; among the reasons are that they recorded deaths even when no name is given for the reportedly killed individual and that they collated reports of deaths from more sources.

Governorate	Number of deaths
Latakia	1,511
Rif Dimashq	34,813
Homs	17,993
Hama	9,867
Al-Hasakah	1,693
Daraa	14,227
Aleppo	31,257
Deir ez-Zor	9,696
Damascus	9,747
Tartus	555
Quneitra	1,069
Idlib	16,699
As-Suwayda	106
Raqqa	2,655
Total	151,888

=== Alawite deaths ===
In May 2013, SOHR stated that at least 41,000 of those killed during the conflict were Alawites. By April 2015, reportedly a third of the country's 250,000 Alawites that were of fighting age had been killed. In April 2017, a pro-opposition source claimed 150,000 young Alawites had died.

== Civilian deaths ==
=== Estimates by different organizations ===
According to the pro-opposition Syrian Observatory for Human Rights, 199,068 civilians had been killed between March 2011 and March 2025. This number does not include an estimated 26,000 civilians killed in government prisons.

Causes	Number of killed civilians
Syrian government forces & allied militias	157,622
Russian forces	8,808
Explosions	5,614
Islamic State	4,935
Various attacks	3,991
Unknown circumstances	3,023
International Coalition forces	2,679
Uncertain as to Russian or Syrian Arab Air Force	2,504
Opposition factions	2,459
Field executions	2,284
Turkish forces	1,155
Prohibited weapons	1,028
Poor living conditions	994
Jihadists	927
Syrian Democratic forces	516
Others	298
Israeli forces	112
Military Operations Administration	109
Jordanian Armed Forces	9
TOTAL	199,068

According to the Violations Documentation Center in Syria, 135,501 civilians had been killed until June 2020.

Perpetrator	Number of killed civilians
Syrian government forces	111,016
Russian forces	6,861
Islamic State	4,969
Other	4,876
Opposition forces (incl. FSA and Islamists)	3,097
International coalition forces	2,778
Turkish forces	1,088
Syrian Democratic Forces	576
Other jihadist factions	162
TOTAL	131,750

The Syrian Network for Human Rights has stated it had documented 231,108 civilian deaths and 14 million displaced between March 2011 and August 2024.

Perpetrator	Numbers of civilians killed	Men	Women	Children
Syrian government forces	202,021	166,241	12,003	23,138
Russian forces	6,969	3,931	983	2,055
Islamic State	5,058	3,512	587	959
Other unnamed parties	8,820	5,837	1,094	1,889
Syrian National Army / Armed Opposition	4,234	2,339	886	1,009
U.S.-led CJTF coalition forces	3,055	1,471	658	926
Syrian Democratic Forces	1,516	1,070	177	259
Hayat Tahrir al Sham	549	391	82	76
Turkistan Islamic Party	4	4	0	0
Total	232,195	181,540	16,319	30,228

The Statista Research Department, utilizing an aggregate of various monitors in Syria, has said that at least 207,000 civilians had been killed in Syria by March 2023, including about 25,000 children.

=== Limitations of data ===
Though there is wide consensus that the Syrian government and its allies have been responsible for a majority of civilian casualties in the Syrian conflict, many observers have raised questions about the accuracy of such numbers. Certain casualty monitors have admitted to having explicit limitations of their data due to methodology and organizational scope that are often limited by access across frontlines. Other observers have noted how inconsistent methodologies, opaque and shifting definitions of non-combatant status, as well as the lack of political independence of organizations can cause discrepancies and biased reporting.

At the start of the war, Al Jazeera journalist Nir Rosen noted that many of the deaths reported daily by activists were in fact armed insurgents falsely presented as civilian deaths, even though real civilian deaths do occur on a regular basis. Several other analysts, including Sharmine Narwani from the Lebanese Al Akhbar newspaper, Eman El-Shenawi from the Saudi Al Arabiya news website, and Adam Taylor from The Washington Post, also urged caution.

This was later confirmed in late May 2012, when Rami Abdulrahman of the Syrian Observatory for Human Rights, one of the pro-opposition monitor groups counting the number of those killed in the uprising, stated that civilians who had taken up arms during the earlier days of the conflict were being counted under the category of "civilians" as they were not army nor army defectors.

In 2018, a group of Yale and Harvard medical scholars writing for The Lancet evaluated the methodology of the Violations Documentation Center (VDC). They note that while the VDC's data collection adheres to international norms of documentation and distinction between civilian and combatants, it acknowledges limitations in its data. The authors note that the VDC claims that "information on victims in government-controlled areas can be difficult to obtain," which can lead to an underestimate of deaths in such areas.

A 2025 investigation published in the crowd-sourced website Fair Observer, authored by human rights researcher Angie Bittar and journalist Jalyssa Dugrot, criticized the Syrian Network for Human Rights for operating with financial opacity and a lack of transparency regarding its board membership and political affiliations with the former Syrian opposition and the Syrian transitional government. The investigation claims that the organization presents conflicting methodologies and inadequate definitions of civilian status that fail to adhere to international standards, raising further questions about casualty recording in the Syrian context.

== Combatant deaths ==
=== Government forces ===
Pro-government combatants	Fatalities
TOTAL	173,367–185,940
Syrian military and police	93,631–106,034
Syrian militias	68,647
Lebanese Hezbollah	1,830–2,000
Russian mercenaries	273
Other non-Syrian fighters	8,986

The Dam Press Media Foundation, a pro-regime media outlet, created a database shortly after the start of the war that contained the names of the Syrian Army's casualties. It cataloged the names of 20,781 soldiers who died from the start of the war until at least mid-March of 2014. The site only appears to have included members of the official Syrian military and police forces, not the government affiliated militias. The website itself went offline after the fall of Damascus to the rebels and is now only partially accessible via the Internet Archive.

The non-Syrian militiamen fatalities figure includes: over 2,000 Afghans, at least 1,308 Iraqi Shia militiamen, 561–620 Iranians, 158 Pakistanis, one Lebanese member of the SSNP, one member of the Lebanese Amal Movement and a Saudi Shiite fighter. Other sources put the overall number of killed Iranian-lead forces, which also includes the Afghan and Pakistani militias, at between 2,500 and 3,500 by the end of August 2017. Also, 1,878 Palestinian militiamen have been killed, according to the PFLP–GC, and these include: 1,100 Liwa Al-Quds fighters, 420 PFLP–GC members, 285 members of the PLA, 42 who belonged to Fatah al-Intifada, 11 PPSF members, 10 Al Saeka Brigade fighters and 10 Free Palestine Movement members. Additionally, the Action Group For Palestinians of Syria reported 21 Galilee Forces fighters had been killed and put the number of dead Free Palestine Movement members higher at 24. 17 PLA soldiers were also missing.

Except one death (August 2011), all of the Hezbollah fatalities have occurred since September 2012.

Between October 2015 and December 2017, it was reported that 150–200 Russian security contractors had been killed. According to the Syrian Observatory for Human Rights, 273 Russian mercenaries were killed in the conflict.

In addition, 1,000 civilian government officials were also killed by November 2012.

=== Anti-government forces ===
Due to the main opposition monitor SOHR's policy early in the conflict of counting rebel fighters that were not defectors as civilians, a comprehensive number of rebels killed in the conflict, thus far, has not been ascertained. In late November 2012, SOHR estimated that at least 10,000 rebels had been killed, but noted the possibility of the figure being higher because the rebels, like the government, were lying about how many of their forces had died to make it look like they were winning. In March 2013, SOHR stated that the actual number of killed rebels and government forces could be double the number they were already able to document.

Anti-government combatants	Fatalities
TOTAL	173,833–215,430
Syrian opposition (including non-ISIL jihadists)	113,862–153,962
ISIL	41,459
SDF & PKK	18,243

There have been 73,122 Jihadists (including foreigners) and foreign SDF fighters, at least 455 anti-government suicide bombers and 246 rebel child soldiers that have been killed in the conflict. 936 of the killed foreigners were in the SDF, mostly Kurds from parts of Kurdistan outside Syrian Kurdistan. More than 3,200 members of the Kurdistan Workers' Party (PKK) also died while fighting alongside the SDF.

== Foreigners killed ==
=== Foreign civilians killed ===
Country	Number of deaths
Palestinians	3,383
Turkey	95
Iraq	47
Lebanon	42
India	39
Jordan	26
Saudi Arabia	23
Somalia	15
Egypt	12
Libya	9
Tunisia	9
United States	6
Sudan	4
United Kingdom	4
Afghanistan	3
Kuwait	3
Australia	2
France	2
Japan	2
Bulgaria	2
Azerbaijan	1
Belgium	1
Greece	1
Iceland	1
Italy	1
Romania	1
Russia	1
Israel	1
Yemen	1
Netherlands	1
Unknown	10

=== Foreign pro-government fighters killed ===
10,907 foreign pro-government fighters have been killed by mid-March 2024, according to the SOHR, including 1,782 Lebanese Hezbollah, 8,852 Non-Syrian militiamen backed by Iran and Russia and 273 Russian-backed non-Syrian mercenaries.

=== Foreign anti-government fighters killed ===
9,936 foreign opposition fighters were killed by late December 2013, according to the Jihadist Salafist Movement in Jordan, with the nationalities being as follows: 1,902 Tunisians, 1,807 Libyans, 1,432 Iraqis, 828 Lebanese, 821 Egyptians, 800 Palestinians, 714 Saudis, 571 Yemenis, 412 Moroccans, 274 Algerians, 202 Jordanians, 91 Omanis, 71 Kuwaitis, 42 Somalis, 30 Albanians and Caucasians, 21 Bahrainis, 9 Emiratis, 8 Qataris, 3 Sudanese and 1 Mauritanian. The London-based European Centre for Syria Research put the number of Saudis killed even higher at 729 a month earlier in November 2013, out of 6,113 foreign fighters reported killed by then. The jihadist movement updated the number of Jordanians killed by late May 2014 to 342, although they put the figure in late October at over 250. According to another estimate, the Jordanian toll was at least 500 by July 2016.

According to Abu Omar al-Shishani, the Chechen ISIL commander, 500 militants from the Caucasus had been killed by mid-January 2014 since the start of the war. Ramzan Kadyrov, Head of the Chechen Republic, stated in mid-November 2015, that 200 Chechens had died.

According to a report by a Syrian military research center, as of September 2014: 3,872 Saudi, 3,691 Chechen and 2,904 Lebanese fighters had been killed. Another 2,689 Saudi fighters were missing.

In mid-May 2015, at least 70 Lebanese fighters were reported killed in the previous several months. In late December 2015, Tunis stated 800 Tunisian ISIL fighters had been killed since the start of the war.

The nationalities of some others are as follows: 2,960 Russians, 403–453 Frenchmen, 400 Turks, 300 Azerbaijanis, 300 Tajiks, 220–380 Germans, 183 Britons, 168 Albanians, 150 Belgians, 150 Kyrgyz, 95 Australians, 88 Bosniaks, 84 Indonesians, 75 Danes, 51 Americans, 50 Swedes, 43 Georgians, 39 Dutch, 37 Italians, 36 Malaysians, 31 Norwegians, 23 Austrians, 23 Canadians, 15–20 Finns, 16 Indians, 13 Afghans, 5 Iranians, 4 Irishmen, 4 Israeli-Arabs, 4 Maldivians, 3 Chinese, 3 Pakistanis, 2–3 Filipinos, 2 Eritreans, 2 Mauritanians, 2 South Africans, 2 Spaniards, 2 Uzbeks, 1 Armenian, 1 Bangladeshi, 1 Bulgarian, 1 Chadian, 1 Japanese, 1 Kazakh, 1 Romanian and 1 Slovenian.

=== Foreign soldiers killed ===
615–672 foreign soldiers have been killed during the conflict, mostly by military involvement from their countries and in the border areas with Syria.

16 Iraqi servicemen killed

On 2 March 2013, one Iraqi soldier was killed during clashes between Syrian rebels and government forces at a Syrian-Iraqi border crossing. On 4 March 2013, 13 Iraqi soldiers were killed by unknown gunmen near the border with Syria while they were transporting 65 Syrian soldiers and government officials back to their country after they had retreated to Iraq a few days earlier. 48 of the Syrians were also killed in the attack. On 9 June 2013, Syrian rebels attacked a southern Iraqi border post, killing one Iraqi guard and wounding two. On 14 July 2013, another attack by fighters from the Syrian side of the border left one Iraqi policeman dead and five others wounded.

8 Jordanian servicemen killed

A Jordanian soldier was killed in clashes with armed militants who were attempting to cross the border from Jordan into Syria on 22 October 2012. On 3 January 2015, ISIL burned a Jordanian military pilot alive in a metal cage. The pilot was captured after his airplane crashed near Raqqa while conducting air-strikes. Six Jordanian soldiers were killed by a car-bomb blast near the Syrian refugee camp of al-Rukban on 21 June 2016.

60 Lebanese servicemen killed

On 1 February 2013, two Lebanese soldiers were killed, along with 1-2 militants, and six were wounded in clashes near the Syrian border which started after an attempt by the military to arrest an anti-Assad rebel commander, who was also killed. On 28 May 2013, three Lebanese soldiers were killed in an attack on their checkpoint near the border town of Arsal by unknown militants who then fled over the border into Syria. On 29 March 2014, three soldiers were killed and four wounded in a suicide bomb attack on their checkpoint near Arsal. 20 soldiers were killed during the Battle of Arsal against Syrian and other foreign jihadists and a further 13 were captured and subsequently executed. On 19 September, two soldiers were killed by a roadside bomb near Arsal. On 2 December, six soldiers were killed and one wounded in an ambush by unknown gunmen in the Tal Hamra area of Ras Baalbek, near the border with Syria. On 23 January 2015, eight soldiers were killed and 22 wounded near Ras Baalbek after their outpost near the border was attacked by ISIL. The fighting also left more than 40 militants dead. Three soldiers were also killed during an offensive against ISIL in the border area in August 2017.

197 Russian servicemen killed

Following the start of Russia's intervention in Syria against rebel and ISIL forces at the end of September 2015, 116 soldiers had died by 23 February 2019. Among them, was a Russian military co-pilot who was killed when his Su-24 military plane was shot down near the Turkish-Syrian border by the Turkish military on 24 November 2015. His pilot was later recovered alive and well by Russian and Syrian special forces. Additionally, a Russian marine was killed when his military rescue helicopter was shot down by rebels while searching for the downed plane's pilots. Almost half of the deaths were attributed to the crash of an An-26 on approach to Khmeimim air base in Latakia, and the accidental shooting down of a reconnaissance plane by Syrian air-defenses. On 18 August 2020, Maj. Gen. Vyacheslav Gladkikh was killed by an improvised explosive device planted on a side road near Deir ez-Zor. Following the Fall of the Assad regime, BBC News Russian confirmed by names the deaths of 190 servicemen of the regular Russian Armed Forces and seven officers of the Russian Federal Security Service (FSB) during the conflict.

298–347 Turkish servicemen killed

Two members of the Turkish Air Force were killed when their F-4 Phantom II military jet was shot down near the Turkish-Syrian border by the Syrian Army on 22 June 2012. On 2 May 2013, one Turkish border guard policeman was killed in a clash with smugglers or rebel fighters on the border between Turkey and Syria. According to the opposition, two rebels were killed as well. Throughout 2014, seven soldiers and a policeman were killed along the border with Syria in shootouts with foreign jihadists, Kurdish fighters and other unknown gunmen. On 22 February 2015, a soldier was killed in an accident during a military incursion into Syria to evacuate Turkish troops at the Tomb of Suleyman Shah. Later, in two incidents in July and September, two soldiers were killed and five wounded by cross-border fire from ISIL territory in Syria. On 15 February 2016, a soldier died at the border during clashes against human smugglers that tried to cross the border illegally. Two Turkish soldiers died in a suicide bombing at a Syrian border crossing in mid-August.

Following the start of Turkey's ground incursion into Syria against ISIL and Kurdish forces in late August 2016, 72 soldiers had died by 29 March 2017. 61–96 more died as result of Turkey's second large incursion between 2018 and 2019, and 79–93 were killed in Idlib during the Turkish military operation that began in February 2018. (Note: Presented Turkish losses during the operation in Idlib Governorate do not include unconfirmed claims of 50–100 dead in the February 2020 Balyun airstrikes. Instead, they include 34 soldiers killed in the airstrike confirmed by Turkey.) Another 16 Turkish soldiers died during Turkey's third incursion in clashes against the SDF. 25 more soldiers also died between 2019 and 2023, in the areas of Operation Euphrates Shield and Operation Olive Branch while 29–37 soldiers died in the area of Operation Peace Spring between January 2020 and September 2022.

The Syrian Observatory for Human Rights documented the deaths of 269 Turkish soldiers in Syria by 15 March 2025.

In early October 2023, clashes between Turkish and pro-Turkish forces on one side and Kurdish forces on the other in northern Syria left eight Turkish soldiers dead.

French serviceman killed

The Élysée Palace announced in September 2017 that a French servicemen of the 13th regiment of paratroopers died in the Levant region during Operation Chammal. It was not known where the precise location of the soldier's death.

British serviceman killed

A British soldier, named as Sgt Matt Tunroe of the 3rd Battalion the Parachute Regiment died on 30 March 2018 in Manbij. This was initially reported as an IED explosion from which a U.S. soldier had also been killed from. However, the Ministry of Defence later clarified it was a case of friendly fire, caused by the accidental detonation of explosives carried by another coalition soldier.

13 American servicemen killed

A U.S. pilot was killed on 30 November 2014, when his F-16 fighter aircraft crashed in Jordan. Also, a U.S. special forces member died due to a IED explosion. Two other service members died due to non-combat causes in northern Syria in 2017. A US serviceman died on 30 March 2018 by an IED explosion in Manbij. Four Americans, including two soldiers, were killed by a bombing in Manbij city on 16 January 2019. One American soldier was killed on 28 April 2019, possibly due to Turkish shelling. Another US soldier died in Syria on January 24, 2020, following a rollover crash in Deir ez-Zor province. On 22 July 2020, a US serviceman died in a mishap involving a vehicle overturn in Al-Hasakah. In January 2024, the US Central Command acknowledged of the death of three US soldiers and injury of 25 others in an attack by a drone on Al-Tanf garrison near the border triangle between Syria, Iraq and Jordan.

== Foreign air-strike casualties ==
The SOHR considers the following figures on ISIL, al-Nusra and other rebel fatalities to be higher due to the groups' efforts to hide their losses.

=== American-led intervention ===
According to the SOHR, U.S.-led Coalition airstrikes have killed 12,868 people across Syria, of which: 9,176 dead were ISIL fighters, 374 Al-Nusra Front militants and other rebels, 169 government soldiers and 2,679 civilians. The air strikes occurred in the period between 23 September 2014 and 15 March 2024.

=== Russian intervention ===
According to the SOHR, Russian airstrikes in Syria killed more than 21,300 people, of whom 6,244 were ISIL fighters, 6,303 militants from the Al-Qaeda affiliate al-Nusra Front and other rebel forces, 8,816 civilians and at least five Turkish soldiers. The air strikes occurred in the period between 30 September 2015 and 30 December 2024. The New York Times accused the Russian air force of specifically focusing on attacking civilian hospitals and other medical facilities, including hospitals on so-called "deconfliction list".

According to Airwars, a not-for-profit transparency project aimed both at tracking and archiving international military actions in conflict zones such as Iraq, Syria and Libya, Russian airstrikes have killed 4,398–6,505 civilians

According to the Russian Defense Ministry, since the start of Russia's aerial campaign in Syria and by 20 October 2018, the Russian Air Force killed more than 87,500 rebels and ISIL fighters.

=== Israeli intervention ===
According to the SOHR, more than 500 people were killed during Israeli air attacks in Syria between January 2018 and September 2020, including: 228 Hezbollah and other pro-Iranian militiamen, 171 Iranian soldiers, 98 Syrian government fighters and 13 civilians were killed by Israel Armed Forces.

According to the SOHR, 119 people were killed during Israeli air attacks in Syria between January and November 3, 2021, including: 38 Syrian soldiers and militiamen, 24 Iraqi militiamen, 17 Afghan militiamen, five Pakistani militiamen, 21 other pro-Iranian foreign militiamen and five civilians.

According to the SOHR, 90 people were killed during Israeli air attacks in Syria between January and December 2022, including: 36 military officers and members of the military's air defences, 11 Iranian-backed Syrian militiamen, 29 Iranian-backed non-Syrian militiamen, 11 Syrian and non-Syrian militiamen working for the Lebanese Hezbollah and one civilian.

According to the SOHR, between January and December 2023, Israeli airstrikes killed 40 Syrian soldiers, 35 Iranian-backed non-Syrian militiamen, six Iranian servicemen, seven Iranian-backed Syrian militiamen, 20 members of Hezbollah, two members of “Al-Jihad Al-Islami” and four civilians.

According to the SOHR, between January and December 2024, Israeli airstrikes killed 64 Syrian soldiers, 41 Iranian-backed non-Syrian militiamen, 25 Iranian servicemen, 162 Iranian-backed Syrian militiamen, 59 members of Hezbollah, 57 Iraqis, six unidentified persons and 68 civilians.

According to the SOHR, between January and September 2025, Israeli airstrikes and rocket attacks by ground forces killed 30 members of the Military Operations Administration, 17 civilians, five unidentified persons (including two persons of Lebanese nationalities) and nine armed civilians.

In summary, between January 2018 and July 2025, Israeli Armed Forces killed 276 pro-Assad Syrian Armed Forces, 30 members of the Military Operations Administration, 758 Hizbollah, Iranian-backed syrian and non-syrian fighters, 2 Jihadists, 9 armed civilians, 11 unidentified persons and 108 civilians.

== Medical workers killed ==
Killings of medical workers since the start of the Syrian Civil War, according to a PHR summary
1. Attacks by government forces (95.5%)
2. ISIL or rebel groups (2.50%)
3. Kurdish forces (0.10%)
4. Unknown forces (1.90%)

A February 2015 joint report by the Center for Public Health and Human Rights of the Johns Hopkins Bloomberg School of Public Health and the Syrian American Medical Society asserted that "Syria is the most dangerous place in the world to be a doctor". Roughly half (an estimated 15,000) of Syrian doctors fled the country. The government passed a law in 2012 making it illegal to render medical aid to anyone suspected to be an opposition member and Amnesty International found that doctors and medical staff also took part in torture of patients.

Physicians for Human Rights has been tracking the medical personnel deaths in Syria, though they state that "these numbers are conservative given the difficulties in reporting during a war." As of the end of September 2015, the number of medical workers killed in the Syrian civil war totaled 679. In March 2017, the number of killed medical personnel was updated to more than 800. 723 of these deaths were attributable to the Syrian government, while 72 were killed by ISIL or rebel groups, one by Kurdish forces, and 13 by unidentified forces. Towards the end of May 2020, the SNHR put the death toll at 855 medical personnel, of which 669 were killed by government forces, 68 by the Russian military, 40 by ISIL, and 36 by the rebels.

Médecins Sans Frontières has reported that suppliers in Syria refuse to sell essential medical supplies such as gauze and surgical threads to doctors due to government intimidation, with this being a particular problem for besieged areas.

== See also ==
- Casualties of the Iraq War
- Casualty recording
