= Hammouda Sabbagh =

Syrian politician

- حمودة الصباغ
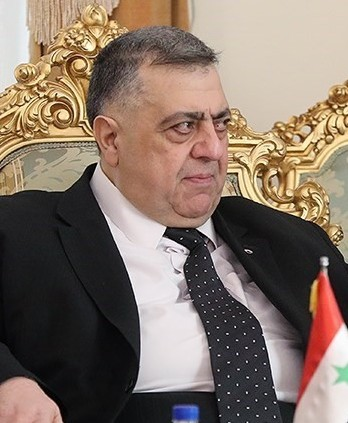
- Sabbagh in 2017

Speaker of the People's Assembly of Syria
- In office 28 September 2017 – 8 December 2024
- President: Bashar al-Assad
- Preceded by: Hadiya Khalaf Abbas
- Succeeded by: Abdul Hamid al-Awak^{[a]}

Member of the Central Command of the Syrian Regional Branch of the Baath Party
- In office 22 April 2017 – 8 December 2024

Personal details
- Born: 10 February 1959 (age 67) Al-Hasakah, Syria, United Arab Republic
- Party: Ba'ath Party (until December 2024)
- Vacant until 12 July 2026.

Hammouda Youssef Sabbagh (Arabic: حمودة يوسف الصباغ, ALA-LC: Ḥammūdah Yūsuf al-Ṣabbāgh, born 10 February 1959) is a Syrian politician who served as Speaker of the People's Council of Syria from 28 September 2017 until 8 December 2024. He was the first Assyrian Christian to have held the post, and overall the second Christian to hold that post since Fares al-Khoury. He was elected speaker of parliament with 193 votes out of 252.

He was the last Speaker under the Ba'athist regime, before the parliament was suspended after the overthrow of Bashar al-Assad.

== See also ==
- Christianity in Syria
