= Najah al-Attar =

Syrian politician (born 1933)

Her Excellency Najah al-Attar
- نجاح العطار

Vice President of Syria
- In office 23 March 2006 – 8 December 2024 Serving with Farouk al-Sharaa (2006–2014); Faisal Mekdad (2024)
- President: Bashar al-Assad
- Preceded by: Zuhair Masharqa; Abdul Halim Khaddam

Minister of Culture
- In office 1 December 1976 – 19 January 2000
- President: Hafez al-Assad
- Preceded by: Office established
- Succeeded by: Maha Qanout

Personal details
- Born: January 10, 1933 (age 93) Damascus, French Syria
- Party: Ba'ath Party
- Other political affiliations: National Progressive Front
- Spouse: Majid al-Azma (m. 1955; died 2018)
- Relations: Muhammad Rida al-Attar (father); Issam al-Attar (brother)
- Profession: Politician; linguist; writer

Najah al-Attar (Arabic: نجاح العطار; born 10 January 1933) is a Syrian politician who served as the vice president of Syria from 2006 to 2024. She was the only woman to have held the post. Previously, she was the Minister of Culture from 1976 to 2000.

== Early life and education ==
Attar was born on 10 January 1933 and raised in Damascus as a member of a Sunni Muslim family. Her father was among the first Arab nationalist leaders who took part in the 1925-1927 Syrian revolt against the French Mandate of Syria.

She studied at the University of Damascus, graduating in 1954, and obtained a PhD in Arabic literature from the University of Edinburgh in the United Kingdom in 1958. She also received a number of certificates then in international relations and in literary and art criticism.

== Career ==
Attar is an accomplished translator and started teaching in high schools within Damascus after her return from Scotland, then worked in the Department of Translation of the Syrian Ministry of Culture, becoming its director in 1969. In 1976, she was appointed minister of culture, serving in that post until 2000, when she was granted retirement, after 24 years and four prime ministers.

Following the terrorist attacks of September 11, 2001 , Syria's new president, Bashar al-Assad , appointed Najah al-Attar as director of the Center for Dialogue of Civilizations, an academic organization whose main activity is organizing research, analysis, and publication of articles on post-9/11 global politics. From 2003 to 2010, she was a member of the Council of Qalamoun University, one of Syria's oldest private universities. She is also a member of the Board of Trustees of the Virtual University of Syria, Syria's first online distance education project.

She is a member of the Presidium of the Union of Arab Writers and the association of literary critics. An author of several books, she has collaborated with the Syrian writer Hanna Mina.

On 23 March 2006, she was appointed vice president, becoming the first woman in that position from Syria and the Arab world. Her term was renewed on July 8, 2015.

== Political alignment ==
Although Attar was vice president and served as a long-term minister in Syria, a state largely controlled by the secular Ba'ath Party, her brother, Issam al-Attar, was the leader of the Damascus faction of the Syrian Muslim Brotherhood and lived in exile in Aachen, West Germany since the 1970s, which saw a government persecution of various Islamist political movements.
