= Vice President of Syria =

Second-highest constitutional office in Syria

Vice President of the Syrian Arab Republic
- نائب رئيس الجمهورية العربية السورية
- Emblem of Syria
- Incumbent; Vacant since 8 December 2024
- Style: Mr/Madam Vice President (informal); His/Her Excellency (diplomatic)
- Seat: Damascus, Syria
- Appointer: President of Syria
- Term length: No term limits, serves at the President's pleasure
- Constituting instrument: Constitutional Declaration (2025)
- Inaugural holder: Maamun al-Kuzbari
- Formation: 25 February 1952; 74 years ago

The vice president of Syria (Arabic: نائب رئيس سوريا, romanized: Nayib Raʾīs Sūriyā), officially the vice president of the Syrian Arab Republic, is the second-highest political position in the Syrian government after the president. The current Constitutional Declaration states that in the case of the president's 'temporary disablement', a vice president may become the acting president.

Multiple people can hold the office of vice president at the same time. The president is responsible for appointing the vice president, alongside determining their powers. Since the fall of the Assad regime, the position has been left vacant.

== Powers, selection and succession ==
Under the Constitutional Declaration of the Syrian Arab Republic:

- The President of the Republic appoints one or more vice presidents,
- The President determines their powers, dismisses them, and accepts their resignations,
- If the presidency becomes vacant, the vice president assumes the President’s powers.

== List of officeholders ==
=== Second Syrian Republic (1950–1958) ===
No.	Portrait	Name (Birth–Death)	Term of office			Political party	President(s)
No.	Portrait	Name (Birth–Death)	Took office	Left office	Time in office	Political party	President(s)
1		Maamun al-Kuzbari مأمون الكزبري (1914–1998)	25 February 1952	28 February 1954	2 years, 3 days	Arab Liberation Movement	Fawzi Selu
1		Maamun al-Kuzbari مأمون الكزبري (1914–1998)	25 February 1952	28 February 1954	2 years, 3 days	Arab Liberation Movement	Adib Shishakli

=== United Arab Republic (1958–1961) ===
No.	Portrait	Name (Birth–Death)	Term of office			Political party	President(s)
No.	Portrait	Name (Birth–Death)	Took office	Left office	Time in office	Political party	President(s)
2		Sabri al-Asali صبري العسلي (1903–1976)	7 March 1958	7 October 1958	214 days	National Party	Gamal Abdel Nasser
2		Akram al-Hawrani أَكْرَم الْحَوْرَانِي (1912–1996)	7 March 1958	19 September 1960	2 years, 196 days	Ba'ath Party (Syria Region)	Gamal Abdel Nasser
2		Abdel Latif Boghdadi عبد اللطيف البغدادي (1917–1999)	7 March 1958	29 September 1961	3 years, 206 days	National Union	Gamal Abdel Nasser
2		Abdel Hakim Amer عبد الحكيم عامر (1919–1967)	7 March 1958	29 September 1961	3 years, 206 days	National Union	Gamal Abdel Nasser
3		Nur al-Din Kahala نور الدين كحالة (1908–1965)	20 September 1960	29 September 1961	1 year, 9 days	National Union	Gamal Abdel Nasser
4		Abdul Hamid al-Sarraj عبد الحميد السراج (1925–2013)	16 August 1961	29 September 1961	44 days	National Union	Gamal Abdel Nasser
4		Kamal el-Din Hussein كمال الدين حسين (1921–1999)	16 August 1961	29 September 1961	44 days	National Union	Gamal Abdel Nasser
4		Zakaria Mohieddin زكريا محيي الدين (1918–2012)	16 August 1961	29 September 1961	44 days	National Union	Gamal Abdel Nasser
4		Hussein el-Shafei حسين محمود حسن الشافعي (1918–2005)	16 August 1961	29 September 1961	44 days	National Union	Gamal Abdel Nasser

=== Ba'athist Syria (1963–2024) ===
No.	Portrait	Name (Birth–Death)	Term of office			Political party	President(s)
No.	Portrait	Name (Birth–Death)	Took office	Left office	Time in office	Political party	President(s)
5		Muhammad Umran محمد عمران (1922–1972)	8 March 1963	15 December 1964	1 year, 282 days	Ba'ath Party (Syria Region)	Lu'ay al-Atassi
5		Muhammad Umran محمد عمران (1922–1972)	8 March 1963	15 December 1964	1 year, 282 days	Ba'ath Party (Syria Region)	Amin al-Hafiz
6		Nureddin al-Atassi نور الدين الأتاسي (1929–1992)	15 December 1964	28 December 1965	1 year, 13 days	Ba'ath Party (Syria Region)	Amin al-Hafiz
7		Shibli al-Aysami شبلي العيسمي (1925–2011)	28 December 1965	23 February 1966	57 days	Ba'ath Party (Syria Region)	Amin al-Hafiz
8		Mahmoud al-Ayyubi محمود الأيوبي (1932–2013)	22 February 1971	7 August 1976	5 years, 5 months	Syrian Ba'ath Party (Syria Region)	Hafez al-Assad
9		Rifaat al-Assad رِفْعَتُ ٱلْأَسَدِ (1937–2026)	11 March 1984	8 February 1998	13 years, 334 days	Syrian Ba'ath Party (Syria Region)	Hafez al-Assad
9		Abdul Halim Khaddam عبدالحليم خدام (1932–2020)	11 March 1984	6 June 2005	21 years, 87 days	Syrian Ba'ath Party (Syria Region)	Hafez al-Assad; Bashar al-Assad
9		Zuhair Masharqa زهير مشارقة (1938–2007)	11 March 1984	21 February 2006	21 years, 347 days	Syrian Ba'ath Party (Syria Region)	Hafez al-Assad; Bashar al-Assad
10		Farouk al-Sharaa فاروق الشرع (born 1938)	21 February 2006	19 July 2014	8 years, 148 days	Syrian Ba'ath Party (Syria Region)	Bashar al-Assad
11		Najah al-Attar نجاح العطار (born 1933)	23 March 2006	8 December 2024	18 years, 260 days	Syrian Ba'ath Party (Syria Region)	Bashar al-Assad
12		Faisal Mekdad فيصل المقداد (born 1954)	23 September 2024	8 December 2024	76 days	Syrian Ba'ath Party (Syria Region)	Bashar al-Assad

== See also ==
- President of Syria
  - List of presidents of Syria
- List of heads of state of Syria
- Prime Minister of Syria
  - List of prime ministers of Syria
- Speaker of the People's Assembly of Syria
