= 2024 in Syria =

- Decades: 2000s; 2010s; 2020s
- See also: History of Syria; Timeline of Syrian history; List of years in Syria

The following is a list of events that occurred in Syria in 2024 during the final year of Ba'athist Syria and the beginning of the Syrian Arab Republic's transitional period. The year also marked the final year of the Syrian civil war, which began in March 2011 and ended with the fall of the Assad regime in December 2024, as well as the end of the Assad family's rule, which had governed Syria as a totalitarian hereditary dictatorship since Hafez al-Assad seized power in 1971 after a coup d'état.

In late 2024, a series of offensives by a coalition of opposition forces led to the capture of Damascus and the fall of the Assad regime, after which the Syrian opposition established a caretaker government. Bashar al-Assad fled to Moscow, where he joined his family, who were already living in exile, and was granted political asylum by the Russian government. At the same time, the Russian Ministry of Foreign Affairs confirmed his resignation and departure. Hay'at Tahrir al-Sham (HTS) leader Ahmed al-Sharaa became the de facto leader of Syria, while Mohammed al-Bashir was appointed prime minister of the caretaker government. The caretaker government was succeeded by the Syrian transitional government on 29 March 2025.

== Incumbents ==
=== Ba'athist Syria ===
| Office | Image | Name | Assumed office / Current length |
|---|---|---|---|
| President of the Syrian Arab Republic | | Bashar al-Assad | 17 July 2000 – 8 December 2024 Overthrown on 8 December 2024 |
| Vice President of the Syrian Arab Republic | | Faisal Mekdad | 24 September 2023 – 8 December 2024 |
| Vice President of the Syrian Arab Republic | | Najah al-Attar | 23 March 2006 – 8 December 2024 |
| Speaker of the People's Assembly | | Hammouda Sabbagh | 18 September 2017 – 8 December 2024 |
| President of the Supreme Constitutional Court | | Mohammad Jihad al-Laham | 18 May 2018 – 8 December 2024 |
| Prime Minister of the Syrian Arab Republic | | Hussein Arnous | 2 September 2020 – 14 September 2024 |
| Prime Minister of the Syrian Arab Republic | | Mohammad Ghazi al-Jalali | 14 September – 10 December 2024 |

=== Post-Ba'athist and transitional period ===
| Office | Image | Name | Assumed office / Current length |
|---|---|---|---|
| De facto Leader of Syria (Note: Emblem used de facto by the Syrian caretaker government from December 2024 until the formation of the Syrian transitional government in March 2025, and retained until July 2025.) | | Ahmed al-Sharaa | 8 December 2024 (19 months ago) (After the overthrow of Bashar al-Assad, al-Sharaa became the de facto leader) |
| Prime Minister of Syria | | Mohammed al-Bashir | 10 December 2024 (19 months ago) |

== Events ==
For events related to the civil war, see Timeline of the Syrian civil war (January–October 2024) and Timeline of the Syrian civil war (November 2024–present)

=== January ===
- 20 January – Assassination of Sadegh Omidzadeh: Israel launches four rockets against a residential building in Damascus, killing four members of the Islamic Revolutionary Guard Corps (IRGC) and another person.

=== February ===
- 1 February – According to American officials, American plans have been approved for multi-day strikes in Iraq and Syria against multiple targets, including Iranian personnel and facilities.
- 2 February – February 2024 American strikes in Iraq and Syria:
  - The US launches retaliatory airstrikes targeting Iran-backed militias in Iraq and Syria, in response to an attack that killed three US troops in Jordan.
- 5 February – A drone attack against a U.S. military base in Deir ez-Zor Governorate kills seven Syrian Democratic Forces fighters and injures 18 others. The Islamic Resistance in Iraq claims responsibility.
- 25 February – Two Hezbollah members are killed by an Israeli strike in al-Qusayr.

=== March ===
- 1 March – An Israeli airstrike in Baniyas kills three people, including an IRGC field commander.
- 16 March – At least 16 truffle hunters including nine women are killed in a landmine explosion in northern Raqqa. The mine is suspected to have been planted by Islamic State.
- 17 March – Israel launches airstrikes in southern Syria. The Syrian state media agency SANA reports that the strikes result in a soldier being wounded and few "material losses".
- 26 March – The Israel Defense Forces (IDF) bombs Syria, killing one Quds Force officer and 15 other militants.
- 29 March – An Israeli airstrike targeting Aleppo International Airport kills 36-38 Syrian soldiers and six Hezbollah fighters. The incident marks the deadliest Israeli attack on Syria since 2021.

=== April ===
- 1 April – 2024 Israeli bombing of the Iranian embassy in Damascus: An Israeli airstrike targeting the Iranian embassy in Damascus kills eight members of the IRGC, including brigadier general Mohammad Reza Zahedi.
- 6 April – Seven children are killed in Daraa Governorate when a roadside bomb explodes.
- 19 April – Missiles believed to be fired by the IDF allegedly hit sites near the Iranian city of Isfahan, sites in Iraq and radar sites in Syria.

=== May ===
- 2 May – Several people are injured in alleged Israeli airstrikes on Damascus, the first since the attack on the Iranian consulate in April.
- 25 May – One person is killed in a car bombing in Mezzeh, Damascus.

=== June ===
- 6 June – A school bus plunges into the Orontes River near Darkush, Idlib Governorate, killing at least six children.
- 11 June – Iraqi security forces in cooperation with U.S.-led coalition forces kill Abu Zainab, a senior member of Islamic State in Raqqa.
- 12 June – Sixteen Syrian soldiers, including an officer, are killed in Homs Governorate in a minefield laid by Islamic State militants and in an attack by the Islamic State.
- 18 June – An Israeli airstrike kills a Syrian army officer in southern Syria.
- 20 June – A court in Sweden acquits former Syrian army general Mohammed Hamo on charges of aiding and abetting crimes against international law during the Syrian Civil War.

=== July ===
- 1 July – Seven people are killed after anti-Turkish protests break out in Turkish-occupied Northern Syria following anti-Syrian riots in Turkey a day earlier.
- 3 July – Investigators in Germany and Sweden arrested eight suspects allied with Syrian President Bashar al-Assad's government over alleged participation in crimes against humanity in Syria.
- 4 July – The Islamic State kills eight people, including two civilians, in an ambush on pro-government militiamen in the Badiya desert.
- 5 July – Luna al-Shibl, a special adviser to President Assad and concurrent director of his political and media offices, dies from injuries sustained in a car accident on 2 July.
- 9 July – Hezbollah launches dozens of rockets at the Israeli-occupied Golan Heights, killing two Israelis.
- 14 July – A Syrian soldier is killed and three others injured in Israeli airstrikes on the Kafr Sousa district of Damascus and other areas in southern Syria.
- 15 July:
  - 2024 Syrian parliamentary election.
  - Muhammad Baraa Katerji, a businessman who is also an associate of President Bashar al-Assad, is killed along with his assistant in an Israeli drone strike near Al-Sabboura.
- 16 July – Former governor of Deir ez-Zor Governorate and director of the Adra Prison Samir Ousman al-Sheikh is arrested by the FBI in Los Angeles, California amid accusations of torturing and killing political dissidents while serving as prison director and governor.
- 26 July – Italy appoints an ambassador to Syria after 12 years, becoming the first G7 country to do so since the Syrian Civil War.

=== August ===
- 12 August:
  - Eighteen progovernment militiamen are killed in an attack by the Syrian Democratic Forces-affiliated Deir ez-Zor Military Council in Deir ez-Zor Governorate.
  - A magnitude 5.0 earthquake strikes Hama Governorate, killing one person.
- 23 August – Abu Abdul Rahman Makki, a senior leader of the al-Qaeda-linked Hurras al-Din, is killed during an airstrike in Jabal Zawiya, Idlib Governorate.
- 24 August – Turkey and Russia resume joint patrols over a parts of northern Syria covered by Operation Peace Spring for the first time since October 2023.

=== September ===
- 9 September – At least 25 people are killed and more than 40 others are wounded in overnight Israeli strikes on Iranian research centers in Masyaf and in Tartus and Hama governorates.
- 14 September – President Assad nominates former Communications Minister Mohammad Ghazi al-Jalali as prime minister.
- 17 September – At least seven people are killed in Syria during simultaneous explosions of pagers used primarily by Hezbollah members in Syria and Lebanon.
- 22 September –
  - Three children are killed and a fourth child from the same family is injured, when a land mine in a plastic bag explodes near a park in Manbij, Aleppo Governorate.
  - Kata'ib Hezbollah announce that Abu Haidar al-Khafaji, a senior commander in the group, was killed in Damascus, and blame Israel for the attack.
- 24 September – Thirty-seven militants belonging to Islamic State and Hurras al-Din are killed in two separate US airstrikes in the northwest of the country.
- 26 September – Over 22,000 residents in Lebanon are reported to have crossed into Syria to escape ongoing Israeli airstrikes and potential escalation of conflict.
- 27 September – Israel launches an airstrike against a Syrian Army post near Kfeir Yabous, killing five soldiers and wounding one.
- 30 September – Twelve pro-Iranian fighters are killed in airstrikes of unknown origin in Deir ez-Zor Governorate.

=== October ===
- 1 October – The Syrian military intercepts several drones and missiles in Damascus. Some explode in the Mezzeh neighbourhood, killing three people and wounding nine more.
- 9 October – Entrepreneur Jin Davod is awarded the Nansen Refugee Award by the United Nations High Commissioner for Refugees, citing her work in connecting trauma survivors to therapists.
- 20 October – The martyrs of Damascus, consisting of eight Franciscan friars and three Maronite brothers who were killed on account of their religion in Ottoman-ruled Syria in 1860, are canonized as saints of the Roman Catholic Church by Pope Francis.
- 28 October – At least 35 militants are killed in US airstrikes on Islamic State camps across Syria.

=== November ===
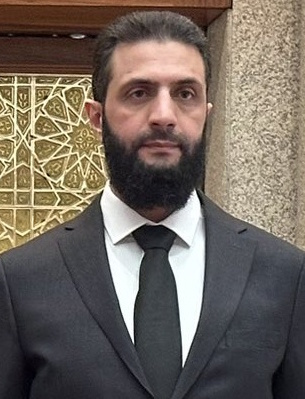
Ahmed al-Sharaa led the Syrian opposition offensives that culminated in the fall of the Assad regime in December 2024, after which he became the de facto leader of Syria.

- 11 November – The US military launches strikes on nine sites across two locations in Syria, aiming at Iranian-backed militias involved in recent attacks on US personnel.
- 27 November – Hayat Tahrir al-Sham (HTS) and allied groups launch a military offensive in Aleppo and Idlib Governorates.
- 29 November – 2024 Syrian opposition offensives: Anti-government rebels enter the city of Aleppo for the first time since 2016.

=== December ===
- 1 December – Pro-Turkish rebels are reported to have taken the city of Tell Rifaat from Kurdish forces.
- 3 December – Aleppo soap is recognized by UNESCO as an Intangible cultural heritage.
- 5 December – 2024 Syrian opposition offensives: The city of Hama is taken by rebels following an offensive.
- 6 December – 2024 Syrian opposition offensives: The city of Deir ez-Zor is taken by Kurdish rebels following an offensive.
- 7 December – 2024 Syrian opposition offensives: The cities of Deraa and Sweida are taken by rebels following an rapid offensive. Insurgents also enter the suburbs of Damascus.
  In 2024, Syria replaced the Ba'ath-era flag with a 2:3 version of the modified independence flag, also known as the revolution flag, following the overthrow of the Assad regime during the Syrian civil war.
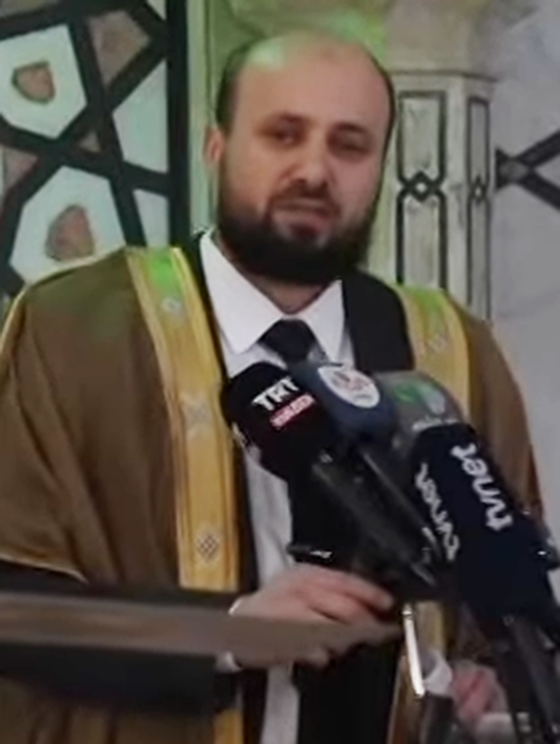
- Following the fall of the Assad regime, Prime Minister Mohammed al-Bashir briefly served as head of the Syrian caretaker government until March 2025.
  8 December –
  - 2024 Syrian opposition offensives: The city of Homs and the capital Damascus fall to rebel forces, marking the end of the regime of president Bashar al-Assad, who flees the country and receives asylum in Russia.
  - 2024 Israeli invasion of Syria: Israeli Prime Minister Benjamin Netanyahu orders the IDF to seize control over the buffer zone separating it and Syrian forces in the Golan Heights that had been in place since 1974 following the collapse of the Assad regime.
  - Fall of the Assad regime: HTS leader Ahmed al-Sharaa became the de facto leader of Syria as the General Commander and head of the New Syrian Administration.
- 9 December –
  - Pro-Turkish rebels seize the town of Manbij from the Syrian Democratic Forces.
  - The IDF destroys multiple vessels of the Syrian Navy following attacks on the ports of Al-Bayda and Latakia.
- 10 December – Mohammed al-Bashir was appointed by the Syrian General Command as the Prime Minister of the Syrian caretaker government following the resignation of Mohammad Ghazi al-Jalali.
- 11 December – The former ruling Baath party of president Assad announces an indefinite suspension of operations.
- 12 December –
  - The caretaker government announces a three-month suspension of the Constitution and the People's Assembly.
  - The United States charges former governor of Deir ez-Zor Governorate Samir Ousman Alsheikh with human rights abuses over his running of Adra Prison in Damascus from 2005 to 2008.
- 14 December – Turkey reopens its embassy in Damascus for the first time since 2011.
- 16 December – A recently created mass grave containing the bodies of 17 executed former Syrian Army soldiers is discovered in the Syrian Desert near Deir ez-Zor.
- 20 December –
  - The United States lifts a $10-million reward it placed for the arrest of HTS leader Ahmed al-Sharaa following meetings between HTS officials and US diplomats in Damascus.
  - The IDF opens fire on demonstrators protesting against the Israeli invasion in Ma'ariya, Daraa Governorate, injuring one person.
- 21 December – Qatar reopens its embassy in Damascus for the first time since 2011.
- 24 December –
  - The caretaker government announces an agreement with most rebel groups to integrate under the jurisdiction of the Ministry of Defense.
  - Protests occur after a Christmas tree is set on fire in Al-Suqaylabiyah, Hama Governorate.
  - The caretaker government says that 14 troops from the interior ministry were killed and 10 others were injured in clashes with Assad loyalists in Tartus.
- 25 December – Authorities impose a curfew from 6 pm to 8 am in Homs following a series of protests by Alawite and Shi'ite Muslim minority groups.
- 26 December – Mohammed Kanjo Hassan, the former head of the Syrian Arab Army's field court and chief of military justice, is arrested in Tartus for sentencing "thousands of people" to death during the civil war.
- 30 December – Maysaa Sabreen is appointed by the caretaker government as governor of the Central Bank of Syria, the first woman to hold the post.

== Holidays ==
- 1 January – New Year's Day
- 8 March – Revolution Day
- 21 March – Mother's Day
- 31 March - Gregorian Easter
- 10 April - Eid al-Fitr
- 17 April - Independence Day
- 1 May – Labour Day
- 5 May - Julian Easter
- 6 May – Martyrs' Day
- 16 June – Eid al-Adha
- 7 July – Islamic New Year
- 15 September – The Prophet's Birthday
- 6 October - Tishreen Liberation War Day
- 25 December - Christmas Day

== Deaths ==
- 1 January – Riad al-Turk, 93, political dissident.
- 20 February – Thanaa Debsi, 82, actress.
- 19 April – Muhammed Faris, 72, military aviator and astronaut.
- 3 May – Issam al-Attar, 96–97, dissident politician and Islamic preacher.
- 15 May – Abdellatif Abdelhamid, 70, film director.
- 5 July – Luna al-Shibl, 48–49, journalist and political adviser.
- 8 December – Ihab Makhlouf, 51, businessman.
- December – Mazen al-Hamada, 47, activist.
