= Sednaya Prison =

Military prison near Damascus, Syria

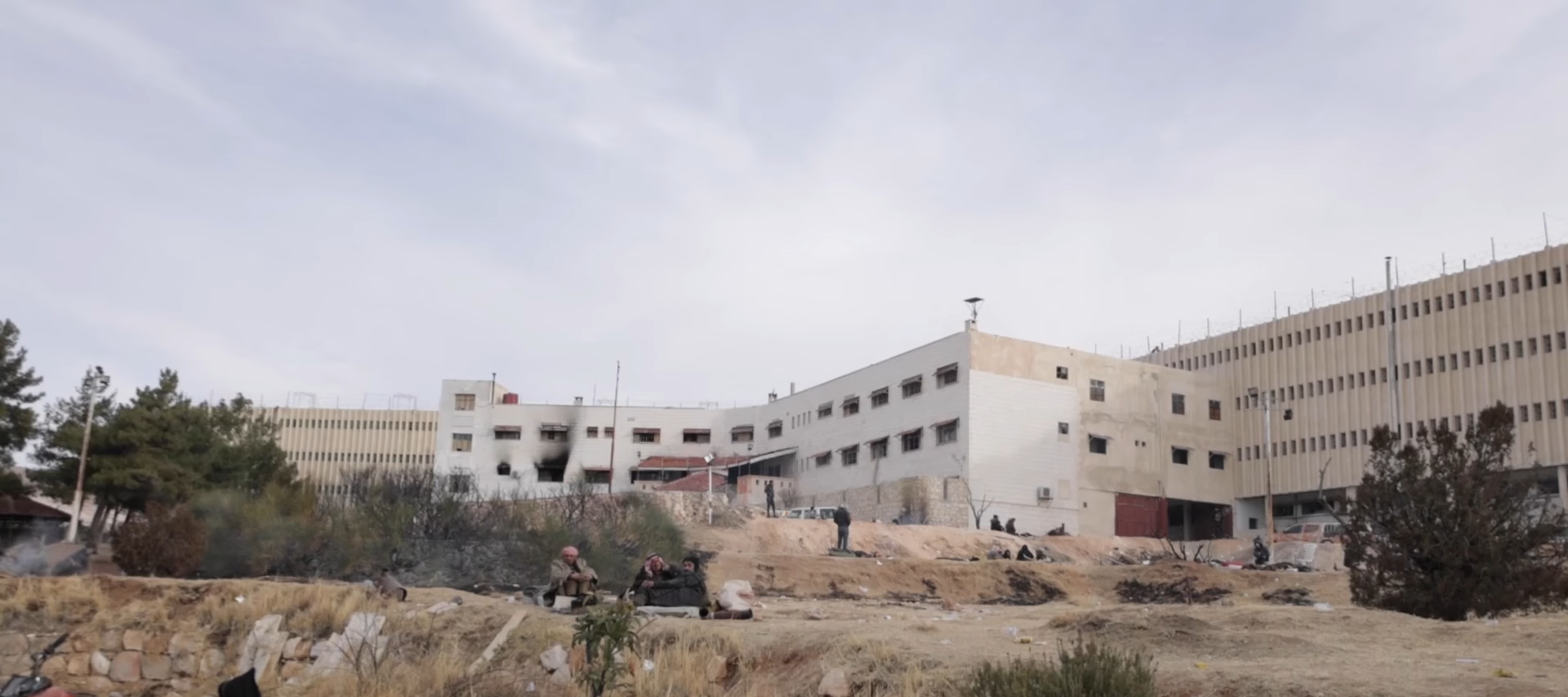
- Sednaya Prison after the fall of the Assad regime in December 2024

- Location within Syria
- Interactive map of Sednaya Prison
- Location: Sednaya, Rif Dimashq Governorate, Syria; 33°39′54″N 36°19′43″E
- Status: Defunct
- Opened: 1986; 40 years ago (construction began in 1981)
- Closed: 8 December 2024; 23 months ago (Fall of Damascus)
- Managed by: Ministry of Defence of Syria (1986–2024)

Sednaya Prison (Arabic: سجن صيدنايا Sijn Ṣaydnāyā), also known as the "Human Slaughterhouse" (المسلخ البشري), (Note: Sources: Human Slaughterhouse: Mass Hangings and Extermination at Sednaya Prison, Syria (PDF). London: Amnesty International. 2017. p. 11. Archived from the original (PDF) on 5 December 2021. (source of Arabic name, English version here); al-Jablawi, Hosam (13 July 2017). "Horrifying Testimony on "Syria's Human Slaughterhouse," Saydnaya Prison". Atlantic Council. Archived from the original on 20 July 2017.; "A 'human slaughterhouse' in Syria". The Washington Post. 11 February 2017. Archived from the original on 14 February 2017.; "The Human Slaughterhouse". Annecy Festival. Archived from the original on 25 March 2023.) was a Syrian military prison and death camp that the Assad regime operated near Damascus from 1986 until the 2024 Syrian opposition offensives. For just over the first two decades after the first group of inmates arrived in 1987, the prison routinely held civilian detainees and political prisoners, but after the beginning of the Syrian civil war in 2011, it was also used to hold anti-government rebels.

The prison was notorious for being the site of severe human rights violations and war crimes perpetrated by Syrian government forces, including torture, rape, and mass executions. In January 2021, the Syrian Observatory for Human Rights estimated that 30,000 prisoners had been killed by the Assad regime at Sednaya since the outbreak of the Syrian civil war, while Amnesty International estimated in February 2017 that between 5,000 and 13,000 people had been victims of extrajudicial killings at the prison between September 2011 and December 2015.

On 8 December 2024, the prison fell into the hands of Syrian opposition forces after the prison administration agreed to surrender the facility in exchange for their safe withdrawal amidst the opposition offensive into Damascus. Subsequently, the remaining prisoners in the "white" building were released. Rebel forces, however, required several additional days to break into the larger "red" building.

In the aftermath of the fall of the Assad regime during the opposition offensives, the Syrian caretaker government compiled and publicly released a list of escaped Sednaya Prison personnel, who are now among the most wanted fugitives in Syria—second only to members of the Assad family.

== History ==
=== Establishment (1978–1986) ===
Efforts to establish Sednaya Prison began in 1978, when the Syrian government confiscated land from local landowners, assigning it to the Ministry of Defense to construct a prison. Construction began in 1981 and finished in 1986, with the first detainees arriving in 1987.

=== Before the Syrian civil war (1987–2011) ===
According to the Syrian Human Rights Committee, the military police changed all the locks of the prison cells on the night of July 4, 2008. On that day, a search operation was launched through all the prison quarters in which the security guards trampled copies of the Quran. The act infuriated Muslim detainees, who rushed to collect the Qur'an copies. The guards opened fire and killed nine of the prisoners. Of the nine deceased, eight were identified: Zakaria Affash, Mohammed Mahareesh, Abdulbaqi Khattab, Ahmed Shalaq, Khalid Bilal, Mo'aid Al-Ali, Mohannad Al-Omar, and Khader Alloush. Later clashes would raise the total number of victims to 25. However, the committee could not ascertain their identities.

According to Diab Serriya, a former detainee who was imprisoned at the time, a fight broke out between a prisoner and a security guard on March 26, 2008, which enraged the prison director Ali Kher Bek. The next day, Bek and accompanying security forces walked through the prison shouting at and insulting prisoners. The security forces dragged the prisoners who were in charge of all the wards from their cells and punished them. Some detainees continuously shouted "Allahu Akbar" and banged on the metal doors. A rebellion broke out that could not be controlled. Serriya told Zaman Alwasel that security forces used tear gas and fired into the air to intimidate prisoners. Many prisoners ran to the roof and began burning blankets, plastic bags, and pieces of wood to signal that the prison was in chaos and that urgent help was needed. When the security forces were unable to regain control, the government initiated negotiations with the prisoners. This incident, known as "the first rebellion", lasted for one day.

The benefits won through "the first rebellion" lasted only a few months until 5 July 2008 when the director launched an offensive to discipline the prisoners. Many fights broke out between the prisoners and the military police until prisoners overpowered them, in addition to exerting control over the whole prison, and retaining more than 1,245 out of 1,500 members of the military police. From the outer fence of the prison, security forces opened fire and killed the first group, which attempted to flee the prison. Fearing suffocation from the tear gas and the bloody scenes inside the building, the prisoners dragged some of the hostages to the roof so they could communicate with the military forces outside and find a way out of the dilemma. However, the government forces opened fire and killed almost 30 military police hostages and some prisoners who were with them. In addition, 10 hostages were killed by the prisoners, and 6 committed suicide out of fear of being killed by the prisoners.

After a long battle, military reinforcements from the capital arrived at Sednaya and laid siege to the prison. After 10 days of negotiation, the government agreed to evacuate the injured who faced torture in Tishreen hospital, and six of them died under torture there.

Human Rights Watch, through its regional Director Sarah Leah Whitson, called on President Bashar al-Assad to immediately order an independent investigation into the police's use of lethal force at Sednaya Prison. SANA, Syria's state-owned news agency, issued a short press release on July 6, stating that "a number of prisoners ... incited chaos and breached public order in the prison and attacked other fellow prisoners ... during an inspection by the prison administration." Ammar al-Qurabi, the director of the National Organization for Human Rights, commented on SANA's release by asking to form a committee of activists that could visit the detainees and ascertain their conditions. He confirmed that the number of prisoners in Sednaya was between 1500 and 2000.

=== During the Syrian civil war (2011–2024) ===
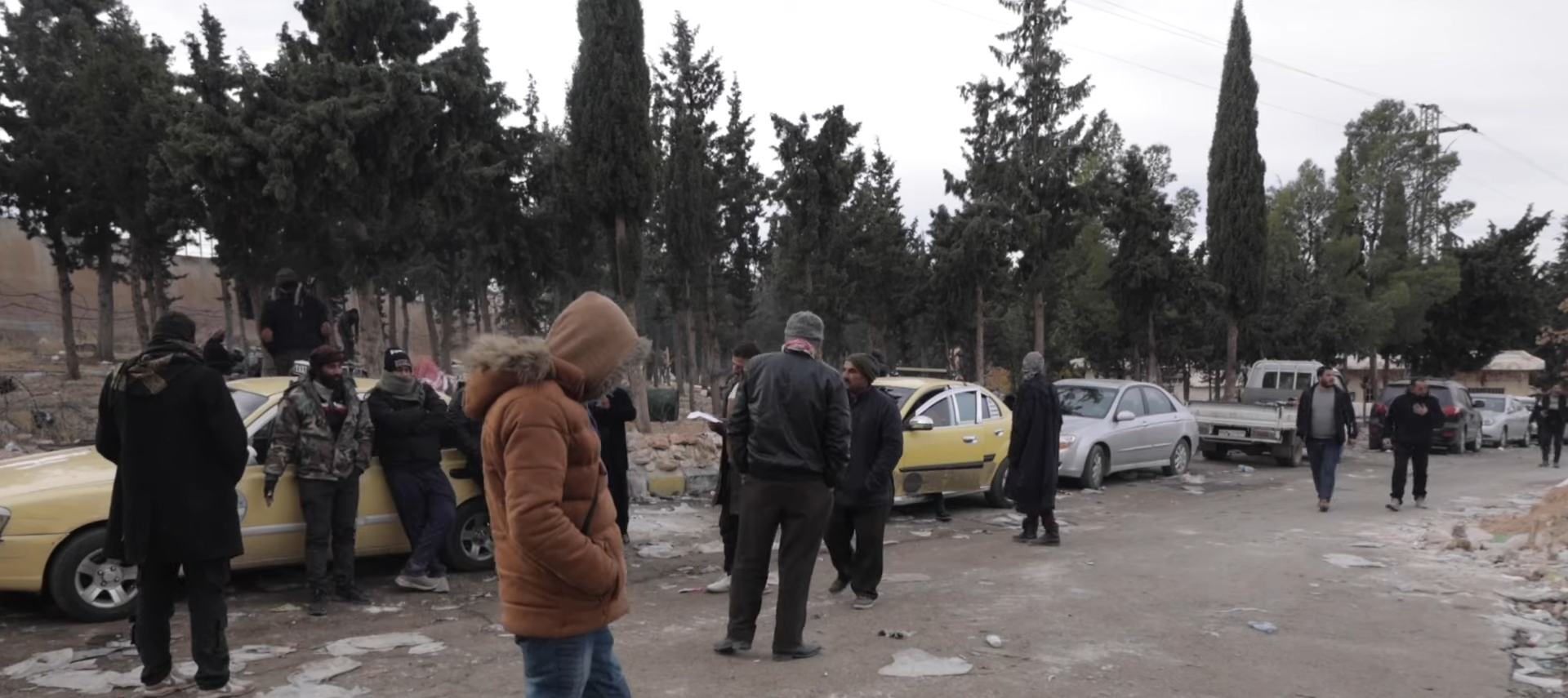
Syrian families wait at Sednaya Prison to search for loved ones, imprisoned since the start of the war

After months of anti-government protests in 2011, many prisoners, including secular and Islamist detainees, were released in several amnesties. Zahran Alloush, Abu Shadi Aboud (brother of Hassan Aboud) and Ahmed Abu Issa were some of the more prominent prisoners released from the prison. After their release, many took up arms against the government and became leaders of Islamist rebel groups, including Jaysh al-Islam, Ahrar ash-Sham, and Suqour al-Sham Brigade in the Syrian civil war.

In 2017, the Association of Detainees and the Missing in Sednaya Prison (ADMSP) was established to support detainees and their relatives.

=== Fall of the Assad regime (2024) ===
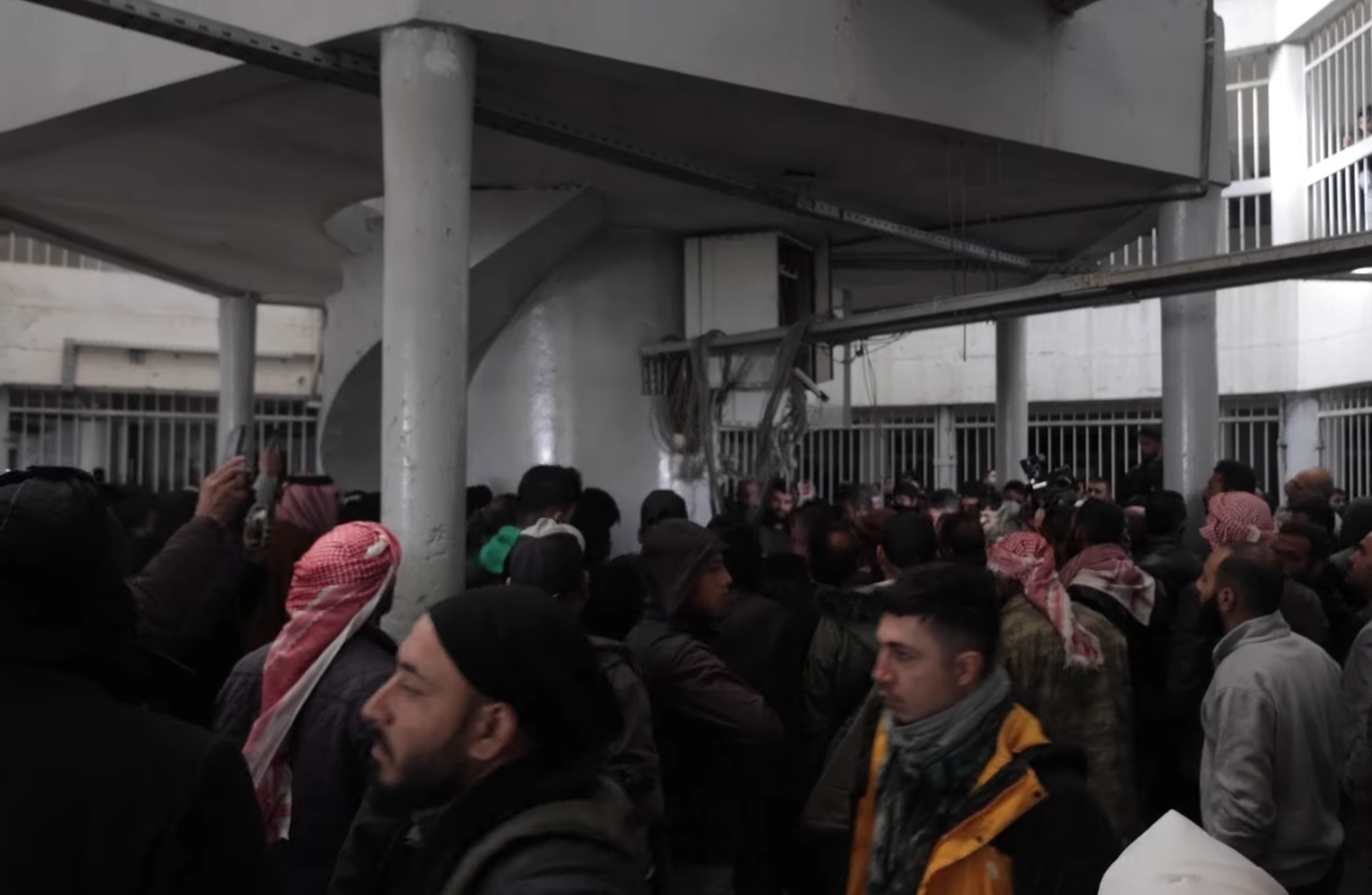
Syrian citizens flock to Sednaya Prison to help search effort

On 8 December 2024, during the fall of the Assad regime, the prison was captured by rebels, who immediately began releasing political prisoners. Many of the detainees were overjoyed, while others were confused. Security camera footage of detainees, including families and children, appeared on social media.

==== Rescue efforts and state of liberated prisoners ====
Rebels entered the women's section of the prison, where some had been imprisoned alongside their children, and began to free them. The rebels identified themselves, informed the prisoners that Bashar al-Assad had fallen, and urged the prisoners to "go wherever they wanted". Inmates initially reacted with confusion and disbelief. Some prisoners who had been detained for decades were unaware that Bashar al-Assad's father Hafez had died in 2000 and believed he was still in power, mistaking the rebels for Ba'athist Iraqi invaders.

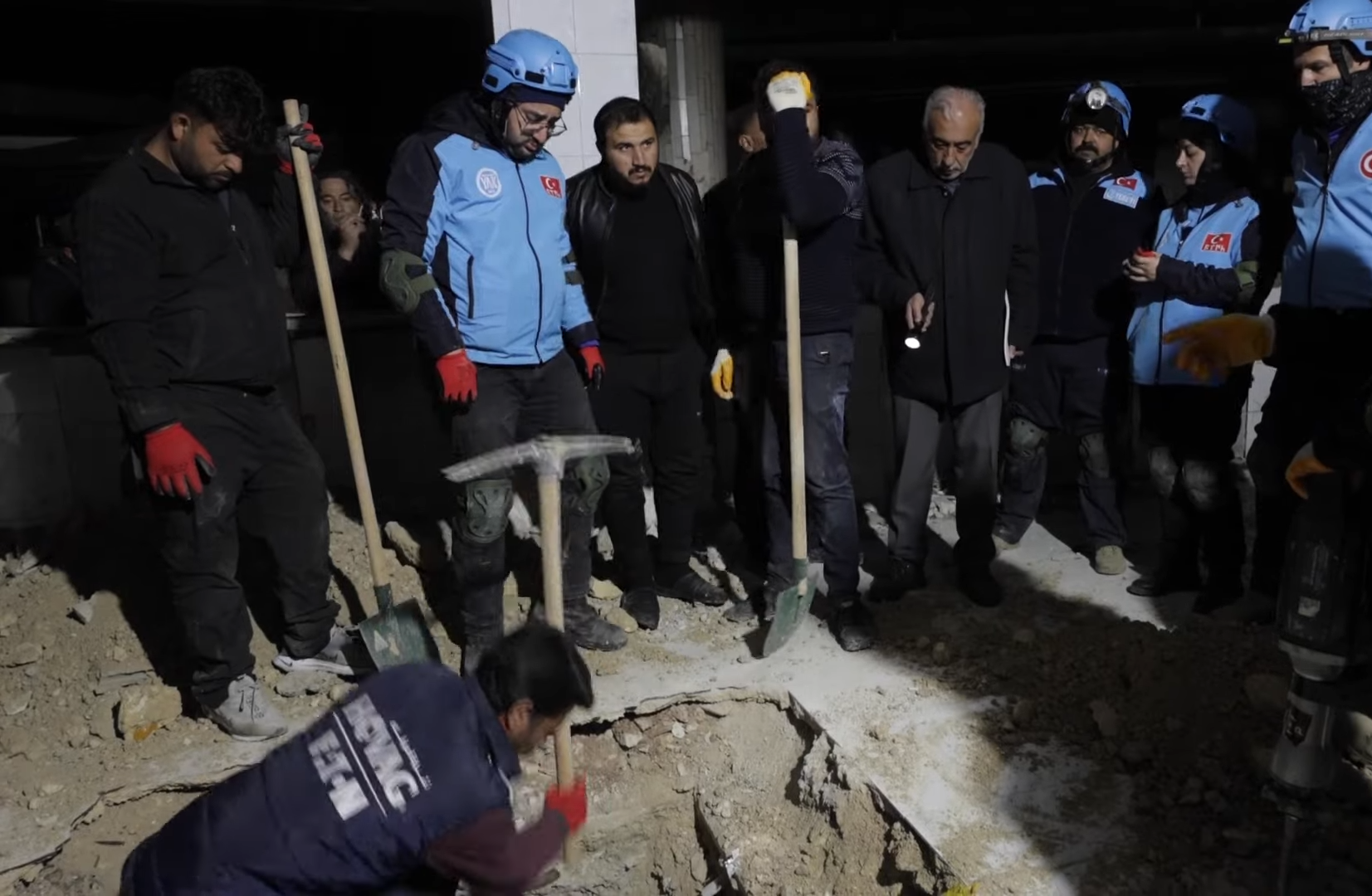
Turkish rescue teams dig through concrete floors to reach the lower levels

During the takeover, rebels discovered underground cells beneath the main prison building where dozens of men were confined in darkness. Prisoners trapped in tunnels under the building called for help, prompting rebels to attempt to break through concrete barriers to reach them as power outages disabled ventilation systems. The cells contained plastic bottles used for urine storage and water-soaked blankets. Rebels uncovered an iron press they alleged was used to compress the remains of executed prisoners. Many released prisoners, having forgotten their own names due to severe trauma, were brought to a nearby mosque for identification. Witnesses reported helicopters landing at the prison on 7 December before rebel forces arrived, apparently evacuating guards and select high-value prisoners.

Search efforts led by the White Helmets concluded on 9 December; they determined no hidden or sealed areas which could contain detainees remained.

==== Fate of forcibly disappeared prisoners ====
According to Fadel Abdul Ghany, director of the Syrian Network for Human Rights, approximately 2,000 prisoners emerged from Sednaya when it was liberated, though questions remained about the fate of thousands more who were believed to have been held there. Videos obtained by The New York Times showed numbered cells that had each held dozens of prisoners each, littered with debris, clothing, and belongings. While some groups reported higher numbers of releases, ADMSP stated it had documentation showing about 4,300 detainees as of 28 October 2024, with approximately that number having been freed.

== Infrastructure ==
=== Facilities and alleged underground system ===
Sednaya Prison is located 30 kilometers (19 mi) north of the Syrian capital, Damascus, in Rif Dimashq. The prison consisted of two buildings, which housed a total of 10,000–20,000 detainees and was operated by the Syrian Military Police under the jurisdiction of the Ministry of Defense. Locals believed that the prison had a hidden underground system that extended three levels below, housing many of the most severely abused prisoners.

==== "White" and "red" buildings ====
Until a rebel photographed the facility from several kilometers away on 7 December 2024, no images of the prison existed other than satellite photos. Based on the satellite images and testimonies, Sednaya Prison had been described by locals as consisting of two buildings. The "white" building was a smaller L-shaped prison believed to have held disloyal officers before being repurposed in 2011 for protesters. The "red" building was a larger, spoke-shaped structure initially used to hold members of the Fighting Vanguard but later housed political prisoners.

=== "Salt rooms" ===
There were at least two so-called "salt rooms" at Sednaya, with the first established as early as 2013. One, located on the first floor of the red building, measured approximately 6 by 8 meters (20 by 26 feet), while another was 4 by 5 meters (13 by 16.5 feet) with no toilet. The rooms were covered in a layer of salt (the type usually used for de-icing roads) and were used as mortuaries to preserve dead bodies in the absence of refrigerated morgues. When a detainee at Sednaya died, their body would be left inside a cell with other inmates for two to five days before being taken to the salt room. The rock salt was sourced from Sabkhat al-Jabbul in Aleppo Governorate.

=== Alleged crematorium ===
On 15 May 2017, the United States Department of State accused the Syrian government of operating a crematorium at the prison to dispose of bodies and destroy evidence of war crimes. This assessment was based on declassified satellite photographs. The photographs, taken over several years starting in 2013, showed building modifications that the State Department interpreted as consistent with a crematorium. More than six Syrians told The New York Times they either witnessed bodies being burned or detected suspicious odors.

However, Amnesty International, which had extensively interviewed former guards and inmates, noted that none had mentioned a crematorium. According to escapees, bodies were typically buried outside the compound. The New York Times reported that Syrian opposition sources and former detainees had alleged the existence of crematoria at other Syrian government detention facilities, including the Mezzeh Air Base, and documented previous instances of government forces burning bodies.

== Human rights violations ==
Human rights organizations have identified over 27 prisons and detention centers run by the Assad regime where detainees were routinely tortured and killed. A Syrian defector, known by the pseudonym Caesar, photographed and smuggled thousands of images from prisons in Damascus and its periphery, providing evidence of detainees who had been tortured and killed.

A wide variety of inhumane torture practices were carried out in the prison, ranging from perpetual beatings, sexual assaults, decapitations, rapes, burnings, and the use of hinged boards known as "flying carpets".

=== Systematic abuse and torture ===
Before being transferred to Sednaya, detainees typically spent months or years in other detention facilities. Sednaya often served as the final destination for prisoners after extended stays in other detention facilities. This practice became systematic after the outbreak of the Syrian Civil War in 2011. The transfer process had drawn international criticism, particularly from Amnesty International, for its use of secret military courts and unfair trials. Prisoners interviewed by Amnesty described these trials as shams that lasted only one to three minutes. Some detainees were falsely told they would be transferred to civilian prisons when they were instead marked for execution. Others were denied any form of trial.

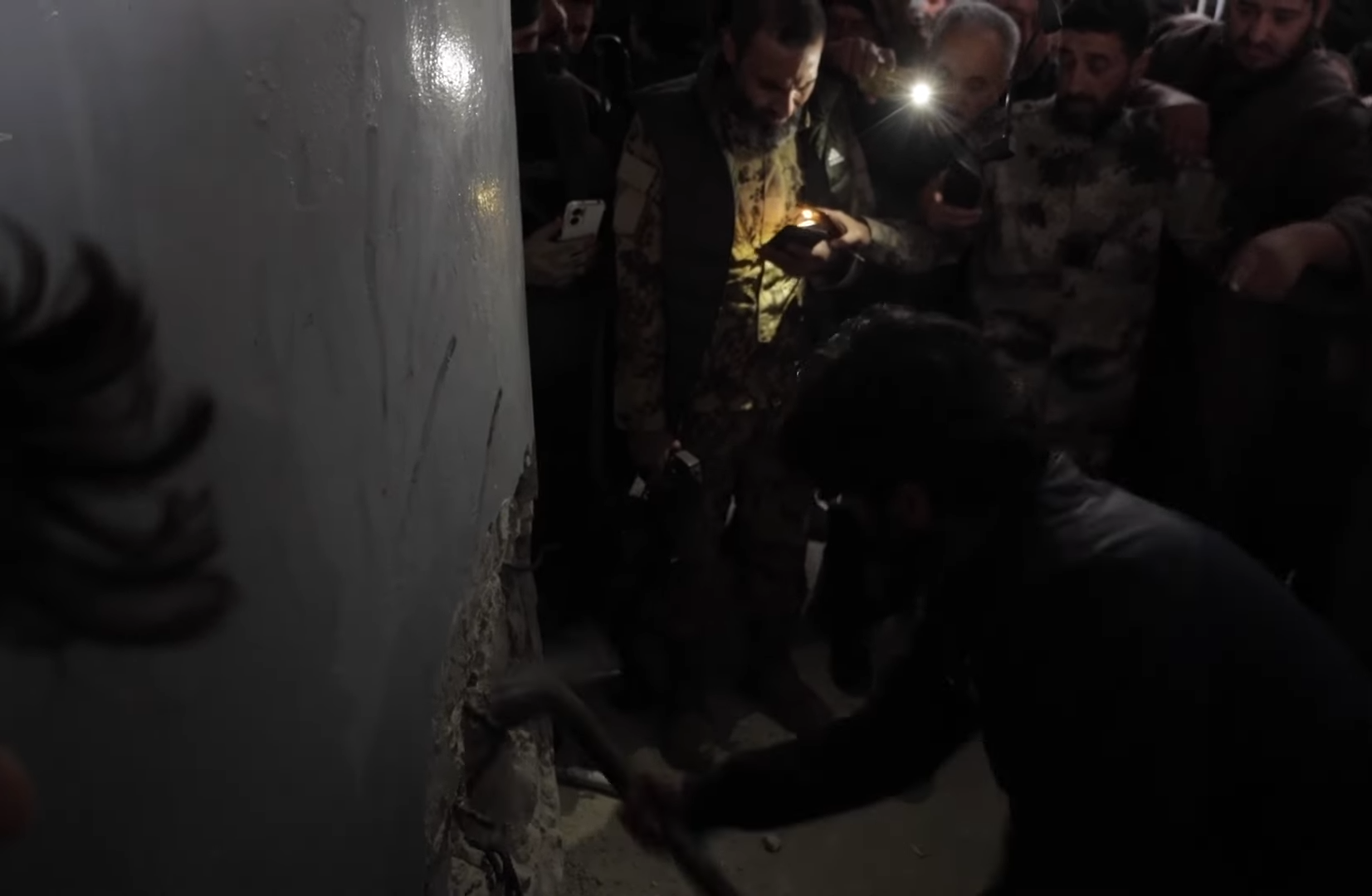
Man attempts to make a hole through concrete to find enclosed hidden rooms

Sednaya was considered the most notorious of the Assad regime's network of prisons and a symbol of the regime's repressiveness due to torture, sexual assault, and mass executions. In 2012, Human Rights Watch documented 27 of these detention centers across Syria, many in Damascus. The scale of abuse and death at these facilities was revealed by Caesar, a forensic photographer for the Military Police. According to the Syrian Network for Human Rights (SNFHR), more than 136,614 people, including 3,698 children and 8,504 women, were detained in Syrian prisons during the Syrian civil war between March 2011 and December 2024.

According to a 2017 Amnesty International report, as many as 13,000 people were hanged in five years at Sednaya. According to the report, based on interviews with former inmates, judges, and guards, groups of up to 50 people were removed from their cells for arbitrary trials, beaten, and hanged. Most of the victims were civilians believed to be opposed to the government of Bashar al-Assad.

==== "Welcome parties" ====
New inmates were subjected to what was known as the "welcome party," during which they were systematically beaten. One former detainee, Salam, a lawyer from Aleppo, described the process: "The soldiers will practice their 'hospitality' with each new group of detainees during the 'welcome party'. ... You are thrown to the ground and they use different instruments for the beatings: electric cables with exposed copper wire ends – they have little hooks so they take a part of your skin – normal electric cables, plastic water pipes of different sizes, and metal bars. Also, they have created what they call the 'tank belt', which is made out of tire that has been cut into strips. They make a very specific sound, which sounds like a small explosion. I was blindfolded the whole time, but I would try to see somehow. All you see is blood: your own blood, the blood of others. After one hit, you lose your sense of what is happening. You're in shock. But then the pain comes."

The detainees were also deprived of food and water, and had been raped and forced to rape each other. When they did get food, it was often mixed with blood. A prisoner's testimony states: "They beat me until I was lying on the ground and then they kicked me with their military boots, in the places where I have had my hip operations, until I passed out. When I woke up, I was back in the solitary cell – they had dragged me back there from that room – but my trousers had been opened and moved down a bit, my abaya [full-length robe] was open and my undershirt was moved up. Everything was hurting, so I couldn't tell if I had been raped. It was overwhelming pain everywhere."

==== Mass executions and extrajudicial killings ====
Amnesty International confirmed the names of 375 individuals executed in Sednaya Prison. The UN Office of the High Commissioner for Human Rights and Human Rights Watch suggested tens of thousands of detainees had died in Sednaya and other detention centers since 2011 as a result of the extermination policies. Amnesty International itself calculates the number of deaths to between 5,000 and 13,000.

There were repeated reports of inhumane conditions for detainees in Sednaya (and other Syrian prisons), ranging from torture and malnutrition to spontaneous executions without fair trials.

"Seventy-five per cent of people who go into Sednaya do not come out alive. It is a field court, where most 'judges' are from the secret police."

— A Syrian lawyer working with prisoners in Hama

=== Documentation and investigations ===
==== Caesar report (2014) ====
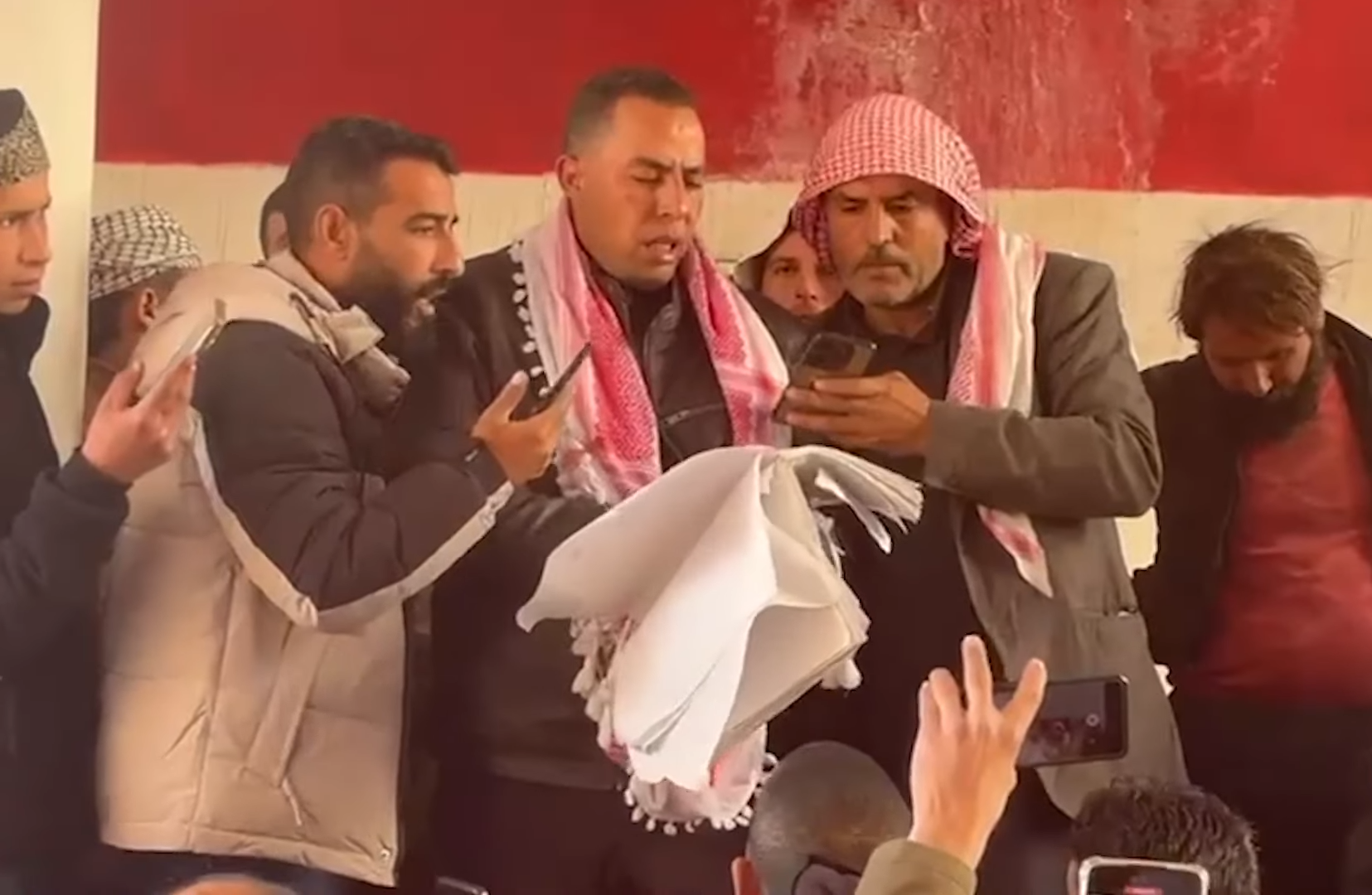
A person reads prison records in search of missing persons, Damascus, Syria.

Sednaya had come into the public eye when the 2014 Syrian detainee report, also known as the Caesar report, was unveiled. It was authored by a legal team consisting of Desmond de Silva, the former chief prosecutor of the Special Court for Sierra Leone, Geoffrey Nice, the former lead prosecutor of ex-president Slobodan Milošević of Yugoslavia, before the International Criminal Tribunal for the former Yugoslavia, and David M. Crane, the first chief prosecutor of the Special Court for Sierra Leone, with the help of a forensic team. The legal and forensic teams concluded that the photos Caesar took were credible and clearly showed "signs of starvation, brutal beatings, strangulation, and other forms of torture and killing." While most of the 55,000 photos encompassing around 11,000 victims from the report are from other detention facilities in Damascus, some are from Sednaya Prison. Prisoners were also often transferred between different facilities. Some detainees were transferred to Sednaya from the Mezze Air Force Branch, while others were taken from Sednaya to Tishreen.

==== Amnesty International report (2017) ====
In early 2017, the Sednaya Military Prison again came into the public eye when an Amnesty International report was released on February 7 that year. The report, the result of the research it conducted between December 2015 and December 2016, raised a plethora of accusations against the Syrian government. It alleged that the government has, at its highest instances, authorized the killings of thousands of people in the prison since 2011. After interviewing 84 people, of which 31 were former detainees, Amnesty International concluded that the government implemented systematic torture in Sednaya.

The lack of accessibility to reports from journalists and monitoring groups made reliable information about the prison very difficult to find. The only available sources on the incidents derive from the memories of former detainees. In April 2016, Amnesty International and Forensic Architecture traveled to Turkey to meet five survivors. The researchers used architectural and acoustic modeling to reconstruct the prison and the survivors' experiences at detention. As there are no images of the prison and because the prisoners were held in darkness under strictly enforced silence, researchers had to depend entirely on their memories and acute experience of sound, footsteps, door opening and locking, and water dripping in the pipes, among other things. Since prisoners rarely saw daylight, they were forced to develop an acute relation to sound. Having to cover their eyes with their hands whenever a guard entered the room made them become attuned to the smallest sounds. In a video interview, a former detainee said, "You try to build an image based on the sounds you hear. You know the person by the sound of his footsteps. You can tell the food times by the sound of the bowl. If you hear screaming, you know newcomers have arrived. When there is no screaming, we know they are accustomed to Sednaya." Sound also became one of the essential tools through which the prison could be digitally reconstructed. Sound artist Lawrence Abu Hamdan used the technique of "echo profiling" to calculate the size of cells, stairwells, and corridors. He played different sound reflections and asked former inmates to match these tones of different decibel levels to the levels of specific incidents inside the prison.

Based on these testimonies and with the help of an architect working with 3D modeling software, Amnesty and Forensic Architecture constructed a model of the entire prison. Witnesses added objects like torture tools, blankets, furniture, and areas from memory, where they recalled them being used. Forensic Architecture's project on Sednaya was part of a larger campaign run by Amnesty International. The project aimed to pressure the Assad government to allow independent monitors into the detention centres.

One detainee, Samer al-Ahmed, was regularly forced to squeeze his head through the small hatch near the bottom of his cell door. It was then straightened out by the prison guards before they, with all their weight, jumped on his head. This required that al-Ahmed's head be pressed against the edge of the hatch. The guards would continue until blood flowed across the floor.

Torture methods in Sednaya varied. One common interrogation technique called Shabeh was described by one of the witnesses: "They had me stand on the barrel, and they tied the rope around my wrists. Then they took away the barrel. There was nothing below my feet. They were dangling in the air. They brought three sticks… They were hitting me everywhere… After they were done beating me with the wooden sticks, they took the cigarettes. They were putting them out all over my body. It felt like a knife excavating my body, cutting me apart." Other methods of torture consisted of leaving people in stress positions while beating them or torturing them with electricity.

Describing the nature of the ongoing torture in the prison, the Amnesty report stated:

"In Sednaya, torture is not used to force a detainee to "confess", as it is in branches of the security forces, but instead as a method of punishment and degradation. The most common form of torture used at Sednaya is regular and brutal beatings. Detainees told Amnesty International that the beatings they endured were sometimes so severe that they caused life-long damage and disability or death. ... Former detainees told Amnesty International that they were also subjected to sexual violence at Sednaya, including rape. According to former detainee "Hassan": "They were making people take their clothes off, and touch each other in sensitive places, and rape each other too. I went through this only one time, but I heard about it happening so much."

The Syrian Justice Ministry condemned the report as "devoid of truth" and a part of a smear campaign against the Syrian government. The ministry argued the allegations were motivated by the government's recent "military victories against terrorist groups".

===== Syrian prisoner accounts =====
The Syrian teenager Mus'ab al-Hariri belonged to the Muslim Brotherhood, an organization banned in Syria, and lived in exile in Saudi Arabia until he returned with his mother in 2002. She worried their return would cause problems for her son because of his political stance, but the Syrian embassy in Saudi Arabia had assured her that this would not happen. Shortly after his return, al-Hariri was sentenced by the Syrian security forces on 24 July 2002.

At the time of arrest, he was only 14 years old. Even though the UN Working Group on Arbitrary Detention announced al-Hariri's detention as arbitrary, the authorities took no step to amend his situation. The UN Working Group based its announcement on its assessment that he did not receive a fair trial. Four main issues that were raised were his young age when arrested, that he had been held in isolation for more than two years, reportedly tortured, and that he was sentenced by the Supreme State Security Court (SSSC) in June 2005 to six years in prison despite no substantial evidence. All the SSSC knew was that al-Hariri belonged to the banned Muslim Brotherhood.

The Syrian Human Rights Committee reported in 2004 that people were arrested that year for political reasons. Providing the suspected individuals with human rights defenders and lawyers was not guaranteed, and as in the case of Mus'ab al-Hariri, hundreds of prisoners remained in prolonged detention without trial or faced sentences enforced after unfair trials. It was also reported that no consideration was given to the poor health conditions of prisoners, who were still held in rigorous conditions.

Omar al-Shogre, a Syrian teenager, has testified that he had gone through 11 Syrian prisons during his several years of imprisonment. Sednaya was the final one. He had described the events in Sednaya as beginning with a "welcome party" during which new inmates were beaten with "metal parts from a tank". In Shogre's case, one officer beat ten newly arrived inmates. He states that "for 15 days [he] couldn't open [his] eyes or get up". After a month in Sednaya, Shogre was taken to a trial under the accusations of terrorism. The trial, he says, lasted for 5 seconds. He contracted tuberculosis there and witnessed what he thinks is an occurrence of "organ harvesting".

A former inmate of the prison who was detained for participating in a peaceful non-violent protest told Amnesty International that at Sednaya, prisoners were forced to choose between dying themselves or killing one of their own relatives or friends. The former inmate also stated that in the first prison he was at, prisoners were also forced into cannibalism, but that prison was "heaven" compared to Sednaya Prison. According to the inmate, the other prison (Branch 215) was "to interrogate" (including through torture), but when that was done, you were moved to Sednaya "to die".

The 2017 Amnesty Report concludes:

"Sednaya Military Prison is a human slaughterhouse. The bodies of Sednaya's victims are taken away by the truckload. Many are hanged, secretly, in the middle of the night. Others die as a result of torture, and many are killed slowly through the systematic deprivation of food, water, medicine, and medical care. It is inconceivable that this is not authorized by the highest levels of the Syrian political leadership."

== Notable inmates ==
- Zahran Alloush, 1971–2015, former leader of Jaysh al-Islam
- Hassan Aboud, 1979–2014, former leader of Ahrar ash-Sham
- Abu Yahia al-Hamawi, 1981, former leader of Ahrar ash-Sham
- Abu Jaber Sheikh, 1968, senior leader of Hay'at Tahrir al-Sham
- Ahmed Issa al-Sheikh, leader of Suqour al-Sham Brigade
- Abu Mohammad al-Adnani, 1977–2016, former leader and spokesperson of the Islamic State
- Abu Luqman, 1973–2018, former Islamic State governor of Raqqah
- Haitham al-Maleh, 1931, human rights activist and lawyer
- Jihad Qassab, 1975–2016, former footballer who was executed on 30 September 2016
- Hassan Soufan, 1977, former leader of Ahrar al-Sham from 2017 to 2018 and the general commander of the Syrian Liberation Front. Now the governor of Latakia Governorate.
- Omar Alshogre, 1995, Director of Detainee Issues at the Syrian Emergency Task Force
- Mazen al-Hamada, 1977–2024, Activist from Deir ez-Zor. His body was discovered on 9 December 2024.
- Ragheed al-Tatari, 1954, former military aviator
- Abu Dujana al-Jubouri, Unknown, Islamic State Commander and Governor of the Aleppo Province

== See also ==
- Prisons Museum
