= Mazen al-Hamada =

Syrian activist (1977–2024)

- مازن الحمادة
- Born: 3 July 1977; Deir ez-Zor, Ba'athist Syria
- Disappeared: 23 February 2020; Damascus International Airport, Ba'athist Syria
- Died: December 2024 (aged 47); Sednaya Prison, Saidnaya, Rif Dimashq Governorate, Ba'athist Syria
- Cause of death: Torture, beatings
- Body discovered: Harasta Military Hospital morgue
- Resting place: Damascus, Syria
- Education: Institute of the Petroleum Industry
- Occupations: Human rights activist, oil and gas technician
- Known for: Testifying on the tortures he endured and witnessed in Bashar al-Assad's prisons between 2011 and 2013; Being rearrested in 2020 and tortured again, until his execution 4 years later
- Criminal charges: First arrests for "protest" crimes in 2011
- Relatives: Joud al-Hamada (niece); Amal al-Hamada (sister)

Mazen al-Hamada (Arabic: مازن الحمادة, romanized: Māzin al-Ḥamāda; 3 July 1977 - c. December 2024) was a Syrian activist from Deir ez-Zor. Hamada was imprisoned and tortured for more than a year and a half for participating in anti-government protests in the context of the Arab Spring in 2011. After being exiled from Syria, he became an asylum seeker in the Netherlands. While residing in Europe, he testified to the abuse he had suffered and witnessed. Hamada became internationally known for his testimony on the crimes of the Ba'athist regime.

In 2020, Hamada decided to return to Syria, only to become the victim of enforced disappearance, when he was arrested upon arrival at the airport by Syrian intelligence. His body was found in Sednaya Prison's morgue on December 9, 2024 after the fall of the Assad regime.

His funeral, held on 12 December, was attended by hundreds of Syrians; he has since been hailed as a martyr and a symbol of the Syrian opposition.

== Biography ==
Hamada was a graduate of the Institute of the Petroleum Industry, and worked as a technician for the French multinational oil and gas company Schlumberger.

At the start of the Syrian revolution of 2011, Hamada took part in demonstrations calling for more freedom and democracy, and decided to film these events with his phone. He later became an employee for the Syrian Emergency Task Force, an organization founded in Washington, DC to support pro-democracy movements in Syria. Hamada was arrested for the first time on April 24, 2011, by regime intelligence services. He was released a week later. After a second arrest on 29 December 2011, and after two weeks of detention in the same branch, he decided to leave for Damascus.

== Arrests, imprisonment, and torture ==
In March 2012, Hamada attempted to smuggle 55 packages of baby formula to a suburb of Damascus. Soon after, he and his two nephews were arrested. They were brought to the branch of the air force intelligence service of Mezzeh Military Airport. Hamada's two nephews would later die in detention. Two weeks after the arrest, he was detained "in a small hangar, a little more than forty feet long and twenty feet wide" with 170 other prisoners.

Under torture, Hamada was forced to confess to charges of being a terrorist, possessing weapons, and murdering regime soldiers. When he refused to confess, agents were called to torture him. He was beaten and suspended by the wrists. To alleviate his suffering, he agreed to sign a forced confession, admitting that he possessed a weapon to protect the demonstrators, but refused to admit to committing any crimes. He was then transferred to another interrogation room, where he was undressed and sexually abused. After this torture he signed all of the documents.

At the beginning of 2013, he was ill and taken to military hospital 601, nicknamed by other detainees as a "slaughterhouse". In transit to the hospital, Hamada was physically assaulted. He was told to forget his name, and was assigned the number "1858". There he saw detainees tortured to death, corpses piling up in the toilets and hospital staff beating patients to death. Hamada begged the doctor to be returned to detention.

Back at Mezzeh airport, he was treated for a month by a detained doctor, before being transferred to the Qaboun military police on 1 June 2013, and then to Adra Prison on 5 June 2013, where he remained for about two months. Mazen eventually was taken to the anti-terrorism court, which ordered his release in September 2013.

His imprisonment lasted one year and seven months. He suffered physical, mental, and sexual abuse, and sustained permanent physical and psychological injuries from his detention in regime prisons, including genital injuries that made having children impossible.

== Exile ==
After his release, Hamada was still wanted by the intelligence services. He therefore decided to leave Syria and applied for asylum in the Netherlands.

While a refugee, Hamada began to speak openly about what he had endured, to alert international opinion on the situation in Syria. He played a central role in the documentary Syria’s Disappeared: The Case Against Assad, by British journalist Sarah Afshar.

Hamada received support from several NGOs in his testimony on the crimes of the Assad regime. He testified before the United States Congress. However, he also struggled to rebuild his life in Europe as he suffered from severe depression and other mental health issues. Severe post-traumatic stress disorder made employment difficult. He also became frustrated by the world's inaction against the Assad regime. During this period, he appeared in a video where he claimed that he was being threatened by Syrian Kurds, and called for violence against them. His family later said that he was not of sound mind when he made those statements.

== Return to Syria, rearrest, and death ==
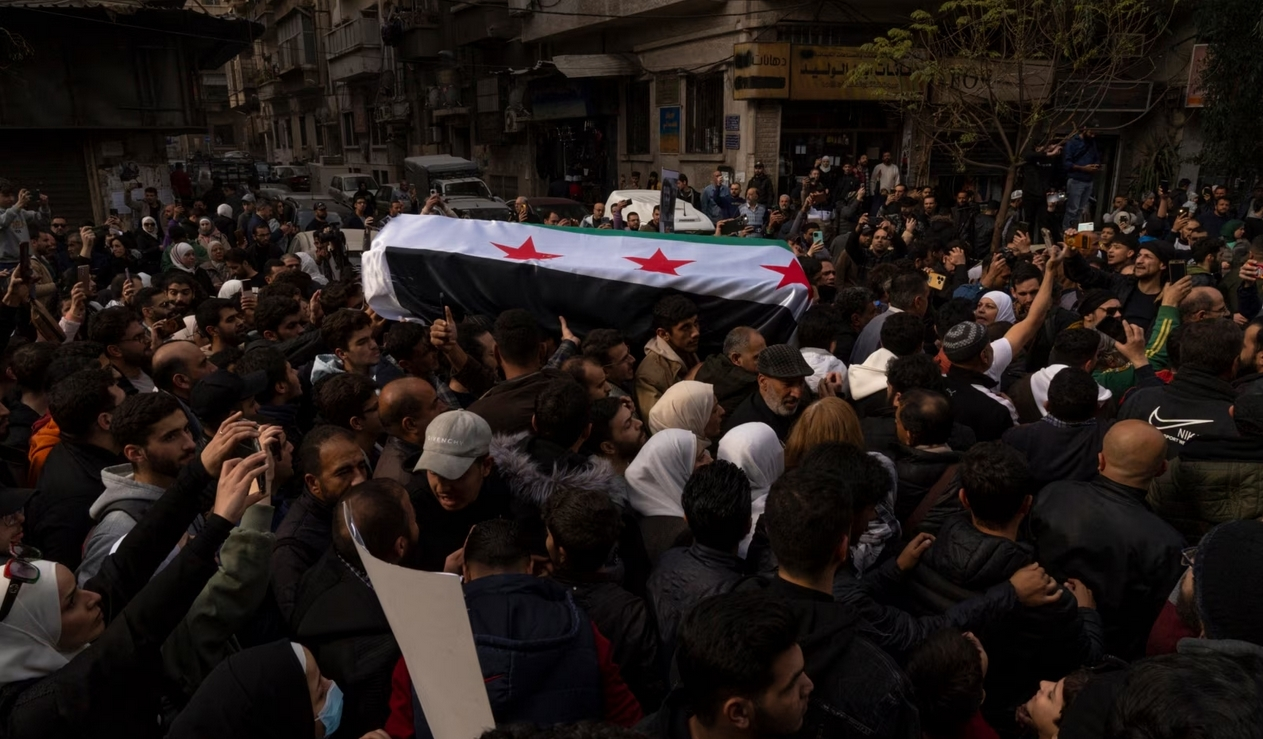
Hamada's body being taken in a procession around Damascus before his funeral

Hamada wanted to help the Syrians still detained but felt powerless to improve their situation. He may have been approached by staff of the Syrian embassy, closely tied to the Assad regime, who lured him back to Syria by promising to release detainees. According to Hamada's sister, he was also told his family would be killed if he didn't return. In February 2020, convinced he would be more useful in his homeland than in exile, he decided to return to Syria.

Hamada went to Berlin where he obtained a Syrian passport and visa from the embassy. Upon arrival at Damascus International Airport on 23 February 2020, Hamada was apprehended by the regime's security services. His fate remained unknown for over four years.

After the fall of Damascus, Hamada's body was found by rebels among dozens of other corpses in the Harasta Military Hospital morgue, a facility of Sednaya Prison. He is believed to have been executed two days before Assad fled the country.

His face was severely disfigured and his body showed extensive signs of torture and beatings. The forensic doctor who examined him said that unlike most prisoners found in the morgue, who died from starvation or asphyxia in their overcrowded cells, Hamada was one of only two with external injuries. Multiple fractures, burn marks and injuries "to his entire body" that had clearly been inflicted over multiple days before his death could be observed. It could not be determined which injury caused his death.

His funeral was held on 12 December in Damascus. Hundreds attended his funeral, during which his coffin was draped with the opposition flag and he was hailed as a martyr by attendants.

== See also ==
- 2014 Syrian detainee report
- List of solved missing person cases (2020s)
