= 1973 raid on al-Mazzah Airport =

1973 airstrike during the Yom Kippur War

Coordinates: 33.478131°N 36.224836°E

- Part of the Yom Kippur War
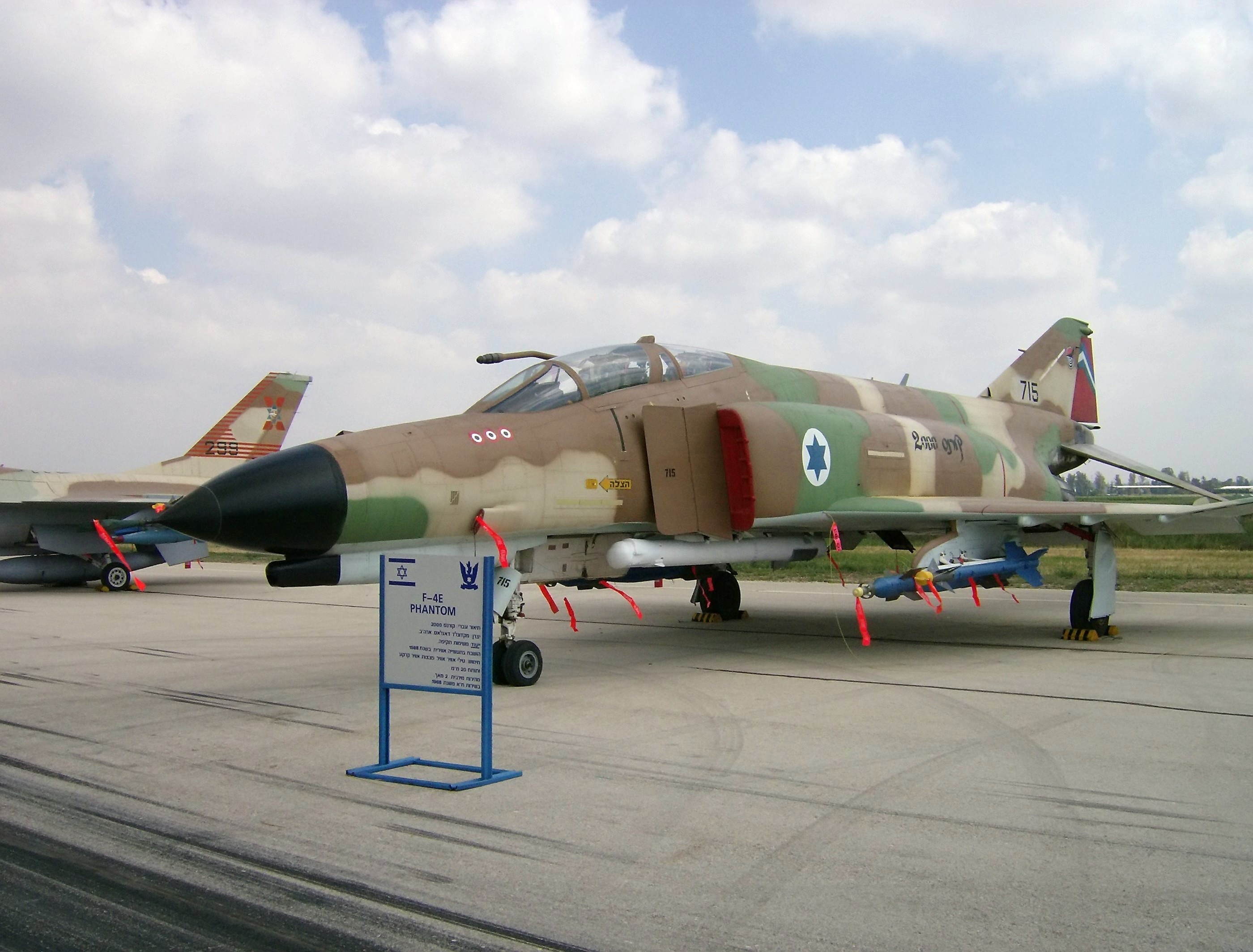
- Israeli F-4E
Date	13 October 1973
Location	al-Mazzah Airport, near al-Mazzah, Damascus
Result	Israeli victory

Belligerents
Israel	Syria

Commanders and leaders
Moshe Dayan; Benny Peled	

Strength
8 F-4 Phantoms; 2 A-4 Skyhawks; 4 Mirage IIIC; 3 helicopters	Syrian Air Defense Force; Syrian Air Force

Casualties and losses
1 F-4E Phantom II destroyed 1 F-4E Phantom II damaged	1 airfield destroyed 2 MiG-21s destroyed

The 1973 raid on al-Mazzah Airport took place on October 13, 1973, and was one of a series of bombing raids carried out by the Israeli Air Force deep inside Syria during the Yom Kippur War.

== Battle ==
Israeli F-4s and Mirage IIICs approached Al-Mazzah airport to conduct a series of raids to neutralize the bases capable of launching attacks over Israeli airspace. Shortly after crossing into Syrian airspace, the Israeli formations came under heavy fire by Soviet-made Syrian Air Force MiG-21s. The Israeli pilots managed to shoot down two of the MiG-21s and then concentrated their attack on the airbase itself. Using the Mirage IIIC's bombing capabilities, they were able to crater the runways and inflict light ground losses. During the raid a MiG-21 shot down an F-4 Phantom; both the pilot and the navigator survived, but they crashed on hostile ground near the airbase, and shortly after that were rescued by IDF forces. Another F-4 Phantom was severely damaged by anti-aircraft fire from the airbase; the plane was escorted back to Israeli airspace, and safely returned home.

== Aftermath ==
Following the attack, a battle erupted between the IDF and Syrian forces, as the IDF attempted to rescue a pilot and a navigator who ejected from their F-4 Phantom II during the raid. One F-4 Phantom II was crippled during the engagement, but was escorted back to safety despite repeated efforts by the Syrian Air Force to shoot down the crippled aircraft. The raid was primarily an Israeli victory as they sustained minimal losses, compared to the losses of the Syrian Air Force, which lost the airbase and two MIG-21's.
