= Luna al-Shibl =

Syrian journalist and political adviser (1975–2024)

- لونا الشبل

Special Adviser to the President of Syria
- In office 14 November 2020 – 5 July 2024
- President: Bashar al-Assad

Personal details
- Born: 1 September 1975 Ira, Suwayda, Syria
- Died: 5 July 2024 (aged 48) Al-Shami Hospital, Damascus, Syria
- Party: Ba'ath Party
- Spouse(s): Sami Kleib (m. 2008; div. 2013) Ammar Saati (m. 2016)
- Children: 1
- Education: Damascus University
- Occupation: Journalist, political adviser

Luna al-Shibl (1 September 1975 – 5 July 2024; Arabic: لونا الشبل) (Note: Also spelled "لونة الشبل") was a Syrian journalist and political adviser who served as a special adviser to former Syrian President Bashar al-Assad. She was known for her influential role within the Syrian government under the Ba'athist regime and her close association with the president. Al-Shibl died in July 2024 following a car accident under circumstances that prompted widespread speculation.

== Early life and education ==
Al-Shibl was born on 1 September 1975 in Ira, Suwayda Governorate, Syria, into a Druze family. She studied at the Faculty of Arts at Damascus University, where she obtained a bachelor's degree in French language, followed by a diploma in interpretation, and later pursued postgraduate studies, earning a master's degree in journalism and media.

== Career ==
=== Journalism ===
Al-Shibl started her career in the Syrian state television. In 2003, she joined Al Jazeera, the Qatari state-owned news network, where she worked as a presenter and reporter. She gained prominence through her program Lilnisaa Faqat (Arabic: للنساء فقط, lit. 'For Women Only') and covered significant events. In May 2010, she resigned from Al Jazeera and returned to Syria, where she briefly worked for Syrian state television.

=== Political career ===
Following the outbreak of the Syrian revolution, al-Shibl served as the Director of the Media and Political Office at the Presidency of Syria. Leaked personal emails from Bashar al-Assad, published by Al Arabiya on 15 March 2012, revealed that she advised Assad on media strategies concerning various issues. The messages also showed her acting as a liaison between Assad and Foreign Ministry spokesperson Jihad Makdissi. In February 2014, she took part in the Geneva II Conference as a member of the Syrian government delegation. On 22 April 2017, she was appointed to the Central Committee of the Arab Socialist Ba'ath Party. On 14 November 2020, she was appointed as a special adviser to President Bashar al-Assad.

Al-Shibl's ascent reportedly stirred tensions within Assad’s inner circle. For years, the president's wife, Asma al-Assad, allegedly sought to remove her from the palace, fueled by persistent rumors of an affair and frequent online references to Shibl as Syria's "Second Lady". Additionally, Bouthaina Shaaban, al-Shibl's initial superior at the palace, also came to oppose her. In a 2026 profile on the fall of the Assad regime, The Atlantic confirmed that she was his lover, based on sources from the palace and Israeli intelligence. The magazine also revealed that she procured other women for Assad to have affairs with, including the wives of high ranking officials.

Al-Shibl accompanied al-Assad on various official visits, including to China in 2023.

== Sanctions ==
In August 2020, the United States Department of the Treasury sanctioned al-Shibl and her husband under the Caesar Syria Civilian Protection Act, citing their roles in supporting the Assad regime's narrative and involvement in human rights abuses.

On 15 March 2021, the British government imposed sanctions on al-Shibl along with six other figures from the Syrian regime, including Foreign Minister Faisal Mekdad and close advisers to Bashar al-Assad.

== Personal life ==
Al-Shibl married Ammar Saati, then a member of the Syrian People's Assembly and former head of the National Union of Syrian Students, in 2016. She had previously been married to Lebanese-French journalist Sami Kleib.

== Death ==
On 2 July 2024, al-Shibl was involved in a car accident on the Damascus-Yaafour highway. She sustained severe injuries, including a cerebral hemorrhage, and was admitted to intensive care at Al-Shami Hospital in Damascus. She died on 5 July 2024.

The circumstances surrounding her death led to speculation and conspiracy theories. Opposition sources claimed that her vehicle was deliberately rammed by an armored car, suggesting an orchestrated assassination. It was reported that the driver of her car was detained and taken to an undisclosed location.

Two months before the accident, in May 2024, President Bashar al-Assad removed al-Shibl and her husband from the central committee of the Ba'ath Party. In the days leading up to her death, reports indicated that she was preparing to leave Syria for a resort in Sochi, Russia, which was said to be owned by her and her husband.

According to the UK-based Syrian Observatory for Human Rights (SOHR), al-Shibl's responsibilities had been reduced in the month prior to her death, reportedly due to Iran's displeasure over claims that she had passed on sensitive details about meetings between Syrian and Iranian officials to Russian counterparts. The SOHR also reported that Syrian intelligence had detained her brother, Brigadier General Mulham al-Shibl, on accusations of "collaborating with Israel and providing information about a meeting of the 'Axis of Resistance' leaders at the Iranian Embassy in Damascus", an action taken after the Israeli airstrike on Iran's consulate in Damascus in April 2024.

Additionally, al-Shibl's husband, Saati was reportedly not allowed to visit her at the hospital she was at. Earlier reports stated that he was dismissed from his academic post at Damascus University in June 2024 amid ongoing corruption investigations. Reports also indicated that his movements had been restricted by authorities and that he was banned from leaving the country.

Further controversy arose when her family in Suwayda reportedly refused to receive condolences due to longstanding familial disputes.

She was buried in the Al-Dahdah cemetery in Damascus. The funeral was notably low-key, with limited official presence and media coverage, which was speculated to be a result of government discontent with al-Shibl and possible involvement in her death.

According to an article published by Al Majalla in 2025, Iranian General Qasem Soleimani, back in 2019 had informed General Ali Mamlouk that al-Shibl was a spy, arguing that she would not have given up her high salary at Al Jazeera to receive a significantly lower one by working for the Syrian government.

In 2026, The Atlantic — citing Israeli and Ba'athist sources — reported that al-Shibl's killing was ordered by Assad personally, and was linked to her feeding of information to Russia.

== See also ==
- Bouthaina Shaaban
- Fall of the Assad regime
