= Al-Qattan =

Al-Qattan (Arabic: القطان) or Qattan (Arabic: قطان) is an Arabic surname. Notable people with the surname include:

- Abdel Mohsin Al-Qattan (1929–2017), Palestinian businessman and politician
- Adnan Al-Qattan, official imam and preacher of Al Fateh Grand Mosque in Bahrain
- Hussein Al-Qattan (1926–2025), Kuwaiti actor
- Ibn al-Qattan (1166–1231), Moroccan hadith scholar, writer and intellectual
- Ignatius V Qattan (1756–1833), patriarch of the Melkite Greek Catholic Church
- Omar al-Qattan (born 1964), Palestinian Kuwaiti film director and film producer, son of Abdel Mohsin
- Toni Qattan (born 1985), Jordanian–Palestinian singer, songwriter, and producer
- Wassim al-Qattan (born 1976), Syrian businessman

== See also ==
- Khalifa Alqattan (1934–2003), Kuwaiti pioneer artist
- Yahya ibn Sa'id al-Qattan (738–813), Basran hadith scholar
- Death of Ahmed Jaber al-Qattan
- A. M. Qattan Foundation, a not-for-profit developmental organisation in Ramallah, West Bank, Palestine
- Kattan, a surname
