= Syrian Emergency Task Force =

Organization supporting the Syrian opposition

- Founded: 2011
- Headquarters: Washington, D.C., U.S.
- Key people: Mouaz Moustafa, Executive-Director
- Revenue: 1,514,690 United States dollar (2022)
- Total assets: 922,529 United States dollar (2022)
- Website: https://setf.ngo/

The Syrian Emergency Task Force (Arabic: فريق الطوارئ السوري; SETF) is a United States–based, 501-C(3) organization established in March 2011 to support the Syrian opposition. SETF advocates in solidarity with the Syrian rebels to inform and educate the American public and its representatives about their struggle.

The organization's primary focus is those still inside Syria suffering from the colossal humanitarian crisis. In 2016, SETF opened a school for orphans, the Wisdom House, in the Northern Idlib Province of Syria and in August 2017 expanded the school to include a Women's Center and High School for girls called "Tomorrow's Dawn". SETF seeks to promote the development of the Syrian civil society based on respect from human dignity and freedom.

In the United States, the focus of the Syrian Emergency Task Force is advocacy on behalf of the Syrian opposition to the American government and bringing awareness to the American people. Their aim is to protect the innocent civilians caught in the war and put pressure on the Syrian government whether that be through advocating for U.S. military support in the Syrian revolution of 2011, congressional office visits, media awareness campaigns, and organizing briefings for key U.S. foreign policy decision-makers. The Syrian Emergency Task Force was instrumental in the drafting and passage of the Caesar Syria Civilian Protection Act.

== The Caesar Act ==
The Syrian Emergency Task Force (SETF) worked in partnership with the Caesar Team and the former Syrian military photographer Fareed al-Madhhan (code-named Caesar), who smuggled 55,000 photographs out of Syria. These images are known as the Caesar file. Caesar's testimony before a U.S. congressional committee prompted the drafting and later passage of the Caesar Syria Civilian Protection Act, also known as the Caesar Act.

In March 2020, the Syrian Emergency Task Force coordinated another Congressional hearing. Caesar, Omar Alshogre, and Raed Al Saleh (of the White Helmets (Syrian Civil War)) testified before the Senate Foreign Relations Committee as to the importance of the Caesar sanctions implementation.

== Programs ==
The Wisdom House School: SETF connects communities in the United States to sustain a Kindergarten for orphans, The Wisdom House, and a women’s center in war-torn Idlib Province in Northwestern Syria.

Rukban Camp: SETF provides life-saving aid to civilians trapped in Rukban Camp for internally displaced persons.

Victims Support: SETF supports survivors of torture in Assad regime detention facilities, witnesses, and their families who are key in bringing legal cases against Assad regime war criminals.

Letters of Hope: SETF connected people in the United States to internally displaced people, mostly children, in Syria through a letter-writing campaign.

SETF officials – including Moustafa – been widely cited in media reports on the Syrian Civil War and have been influential in advising United States policymakers on issues related to Syria. According to the group, SETF staff have held meetings with more than two-thirds of the membership of the U.S. Congress and have organized junkets for members of congress to visit selected regions in northern Syria.

== See also ==
- 2014 Syrian detainee report
- Caesar Syria Civilian Protection Act
- Human rights in Syria
- Syrian American Council
- U.S. Holocaust Memorial Museum
- Omar Alshogre, SETF's Director of Detainee Issues
