= Kattan =

Kattan or Kattán is a surname. Notable people with the surname include:

- Carlos Gabriel Kattán (born 1957), Honduran economist, businessman and politician
- Chris Kattan (born 1970), American actor and comedian
- Fadi Kattan (born c. 1977), Palestinian chef and hotelier
- Hanan Kattan (born 1962), Jordanian-born, British-based film producer
- Huda Kattan (born 1983), American makeup artist, beauty blogger and entrepreneur
- Lizzette Kattan, Honduran-born, US-based fashion editor
- Mona Kattan (born 1985), American entrepreneur
- Naïm Kattan (1928–2021), Canadian novelist, essayist and critic
- Sarah Rita Kattan, Lebanese architect and Scout leader
- Victor Kattan (born 1979), British legal academic

== See also ==
- Al-Qattan
