= Omar Alshogre =

Syrian refugee and human rights activist (born 1995)

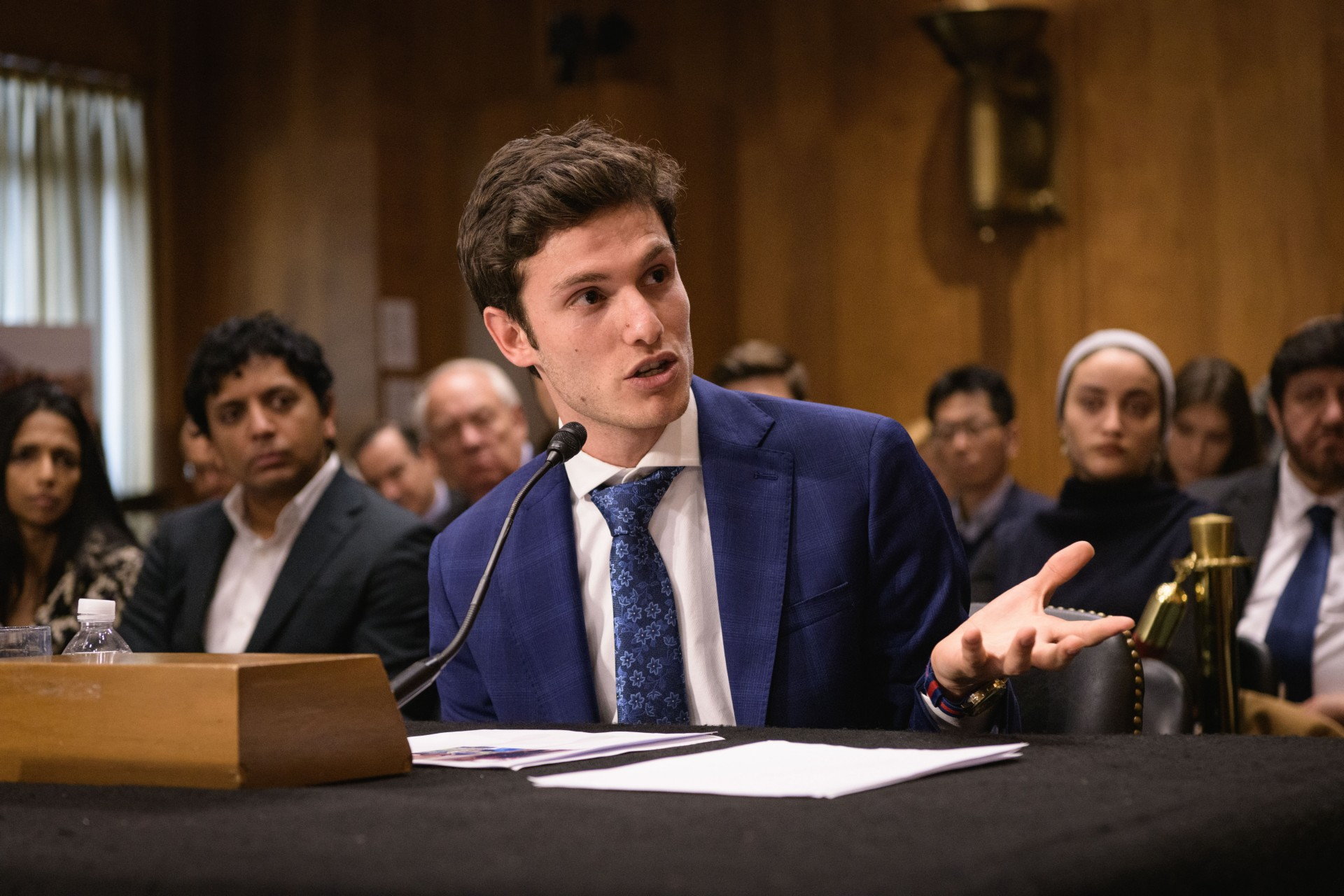
- Omar Alshogre testifying to the U.S. Senate Foreign Relations Committee in Washington D.C. on March 11, 2020
- Born: Omar Alshogre; 14 May 1995 (age 31) al-Bayda, Syria
- Education: Georgetown University (2021–2024)
- Occupations: Director for detainee affairs at the Syrian Emergency Task Force, public speaker, human rights activist
- Years active: 2016–present

Omar Alshogre (Arabic: عمر الشغري) is a Syrian refugee, public speaker, and human rights activist. He is currently the director for detainee affairs at the Syrian Emergency Task Force. He is known for his efforts to raise awareness of human rights abuses in Syria and his personal experience of torture and starvation by the Assad regime during his three years of detention.

Alshogre, born in al-Bayda in 1995. He is among the few people to have survived Assad's prisons prior to their dissolution in 2024 and had the position to share his experience.

== Biography ==
=== Arrest ===
The Assad regime first arrested Alshogre for participating in an anti-government protest when he was 15 years old. The regime jailed him for two days and subsequently released him. The regime arrested him seven times between 2011 and 2013.

On November 16, 2012, while visiting his cousins, armed militiamen entered his house and arrested Omar alongside his cousins, Bashir, Nour, and Rashad. The militiamen sent them to military Intelligence in central Tartus for investigation. Bashir and Rashad would both die in prison. Alshogre then spent a total of three years in detention.

=== Detention ===
Alshogre spent a year and nine months in Branch 215, a military intelligence detention center in central Damascus. Alongside other detainees, he experienced daily torture, including by electrical shock, beatings with cable and metal, and the removal of his finger nails.

During his detention in Branch 215, the detention center administration charged him with removing the bodies of prisoners who had died and numbering their foreheads.

On March 15, 2013, Alshogre's older cousin Rashad died after enduring extreme torture. In early 2014, his closest cousin, Bashir, died as a result of torture and tuberculosis. Alshogre had been carrying him to enable him to go to the restroom, as he had become too weak to walk on his own.

Alshogre carried Bashir's body to the mortuary and numbered his forehead.

The regime transferred Alshogre to Sednaya Prison on August 15, 2014. He says Branch 215 was heaven compared to Sednaya, where psychological and physical torture were much more intense. He attests that prisoners faced arbitrary executions for offenses like talking without authorization. Alshogre learned both solidarity and a wealth of knowledge from the doctors, teachers and other educated inmates he met there. Alshogre has termed this experience "the University of Whispers."

=== Release ===
Alshogre's mother, who had fled to Turkey, collected $15,000 to pay a bribe for his release. He was freed in June 2015 following a mock execution. At that time, he weighed only 34 kilograms as a result of starvation and tuberculosis. He travelled to Europe as a refugee seeking to obtain access to medical treatment and escape from the regime.

=== Life in Sweden ===
Alshogre was a refugee in Sweden. In Sweden he and his younger brother, Ali, were fostered by Eva Hamilton, former CEO for the Swedish public service television company Sveriges Television. They were 20 and 10 years old respectively when they moved in to Eva Hamilton's house in Nacka, an affluent suburb south of Stockholm.

He has learned English, Norwegian, and Swedish and graduated from high school. He shares his personal story to raise awareness of the abuses of the Assad regime.

Together with other victims, witnesses, activists and lawyers he has contributed to a legal battle for justice in European courts. He has given testimony to German lawyers and prosecutors as well as to European war crimes investigators to build cases against the regime. The first European case against Syrian crimes against humanity started in April 2020.

He has received death threats for his open discussion of the abuses he faced. In January 2018, one of his former torturers from Branch 215 called him and told him he was in Stockholm. The Nation has noted Alshogre "[a]s one of the few to survive the slaughterhouse of Sednaya, and someone who has personally tagged over 8,000 bodies, who appears in various media and can rattle off the names and locations of multiple military prisons, including the brigadier general in charge of each facility and the names of deceased inmates and their home towns, Omar is a formidable and feared witness".

Alshogre was awarded a Compass Rose Scholarship by the King of Sweden in April 2020, for his compassion, courage and strong values.

In June 2020, Alshogre appealed to his former torturer in Syria through a video posted on his YouTube channel and highlighted by Al Jazeera, expressing a hope that he would remain in good health but recognizing that the coronavirus leveled the difference between weak and strong, jailer and detainee.

=== Life in the United States ===
Alshogre moved to Washington, D.C., in 2021 to study at Georgetown University. A previous video on Twitter filming his reaction to being accepted to the university went viral in November 2020.

He currently assists in legal prosecutions against those who have committed crimes in Syria, serving as a key witness in prosecution efforts. He also travels and gives speeches across the US and Europe, including at the UN Security Council, TEDxGeorgetown, Harvard Law School and at the Human Rights Foundation’s Oslo Freedom Forum in Norway.
