= Abu Luqman =

Syrian jihadi (1973–2018)

- Born: Ali Moussa Al-Shawakh; 1973; Raqqa, Syria
- Died: 17 April 2018 (aged 44–45); Syria
- Other name: Abu Ayyub al-Ansari/Ali al-Hamoud
- Occupation: Islamic militant
- Years active: 2011-2018
- Known for: Member of ISIL

Ali Moussa Al-Shawakh, (Arabic: علي موسى الشواخ; 1973 –17 April 2018) known by his kunya Abu Luqman (Arabic: أبو لقمان), Abu Ayyub al-Ansari (Arabic: أبو أيوب الأنصاري) or Ali al-Hamoud (Arabic: علي الحمود), was a Syrian man and the Islamic State of Iraq and the Levant governor of Raqqa, Syria as of July 2015. He used to be governor of Aleppo province.

== History ==
Abu Luqman was born in as-Sahl village in Raqqa province. He studied law at the University of Aleppo. He is from the Ajeel clan of Raqqa. It is claimed he used to have a Sufi orientation because he followed Mahmud al-Aghasi (known as Abu Qaqa) who was the leader of Ghuraba al-Sham.

He was freed from Sednaya Prison, Damascus in the summer of 2011 by President Bashar al-Assad, at the outset of the uprising against the Syrian government.

== ISIL activity ==
According to Ibrahim Muslem, a human-rights activist quoted by The Wall Street Journal, "Abu Luqman decides who gets the oil". At Mr. Luqman's discretion, smugglers paid for fuel and loaded it into tanker trucks. Refined products from the Akrish refinery were driven more than 200 miles to Syrian villages near the Turkish border, according to Mr. Muslem.

Mohammed al-Saleh, a spokesman for the advocacy group Raqqa is Being Slaughtered Silently, quoted in The Wall Street Journal, said Abu Luqman replaced several foreign generals with locals after the loss of the town of Tell Abyad.

He was also responsible for the execution of Abu Saad al-Hadram, Jabhat al-Nusra's commander for Raqqa province.

=== 2014 ===
In early 2014, he was ISIL's chief interrogator in Raqqa province. As of April 2014, he was the IS emir of Raqqa province. In this role, he was the primary official responsible for appointing other ISIL leaders, distributing fighters among the various IS fighting fronts, and publicizing ISIL military operations. In mid-2014, he ordered the beheading of two hostages held by ISIL.

As of late 2014, he was a member of ISIL's eight-member governing council. His responsibilities for ISIL included frequently traveling across Syria to transfer ISIL prisoners. Also in late 2014, he changed his name when he was reported dead in the press as a security measure.

=== 2015 ===
In early 2015, he was a member of an ISIL governance council chaired by IS leader Abu Bakr al-Baghdadi. As of early 2015, he was the senior figure in charge of ISIL detention of Western hostages.

In June 2015, he was the governor of Aleppo and the security emir for Syria responsible for foreign fighters. Previously as governor of Raqqa, he was responsible for executions. In July 2015, he was reappointed governor of Raqqa and was the de facto chief in Raqqa, overseeing security affairs. As of mid-2015, he was ISIL's overall security amir at a Raqqa detention facility holding more than 1,000 ISIL foreign recruits who had refused to fight.

=== US and UN sanctions ===
On 29 September 2015 he was added to the United States Department of Treasury Office of Foreign Assets Control Specially Designated Nationals List.

The US Department of Treasury further describes his role, saying "Al-Shawakh is being designated for acting for or on behalf of ISIL, an entity designated pursuant to E.O. 13224. As of mid-2015, Syrian national al-Shawakh served as ISIL’s governor for Raqqa, Syria, after having served as ISIL’s senior security official for Syria and as governor in Aleppo, roles in which he directed combat assignments for foreign fighters. Al-Shawakh was in charge of ISIL’s detention of foreign hostages, and oversaw the appointment of other ISIL leaders. Al-Shawakh supervised security matters, including executions, interrogations, and transfers of ISIL prisoners, at an Raqqa detention facility used to hold foreign hostages and ISIL foreign recruits who had refused to fight. In mid-2014, al-Shawakh ordered the beheadings of two ISIL hostages. Al-Shawakh also served on a governance council chaired by ISIL leader and U.S. and UN-designated SDGT Abu Bakr al-Baghdadi (AKA Dr. Ibrahim al-Badri)".

He is also sanctioned by the United Nations who said, "Ali Musa al-Shawakh was listed on 29 February 2016 pursuant to paragraphs 2 and 4 of resolution 2161 (2014) as being associated with Al-Qaida for “participating in the financing, planning, facilitating, preparing, or perpetrating of acts or activities by, in conjunction with, under the name of, on behalf of, or in support of” the Islamic State in Iraq and the Levant (ISIL), listed as Al-Qaida in Iraq (QDe.115)".

== Death ==
Abu Luqman was reportedly killed by an Iraqi airstrike on 17 April 2018.
