= Mouaz Moustafa =

Syrian-American activist

Mouaz Moustafa is a Palestinian-Syrian-American activist and executive director of the Syrian Emergency Task Force (SETF), advocating for democracy and human rights in Syria. Born in a Palestinian refugee camp near Damascus, he moved to the United States at age nine and later worked on Capitol Hill before founding SETF in 2011. Moustafa has coordinated humanitarian efforts, facilitated high-profile delegations, and provided media commentary on Syria. His work has sparked both praise and criticism for its approach and affiliations.

== Early life ==
Born a Palestinian refugee in a refugee camp near Damascus, Syria, he is the son of Mona and Kamal Moustafa. He moved to the United States at the age of nine in 1995. He earned a degree in international relations from the University of Central Arkansas and subsequently worked on Capitol Hill as a staffer for U.S. Congressman Vic Snyder and U.S. Senator Blanche Lincoln.

== Syrian Emergency Task Force ==
In 2011, Moustafa became the executive director of the Syrian Emergency Task Force (SETF), an organization that supports the pro-democracy movement in Syria. In this role, he has coordinated advocacy efforts, led delegations to the Syrian border for journalists and lawmakers, and overseen humanitarian projects within Syria.

Notably, he facilitated U.S. Senator John McCain's visit with the Northern Storm Brigade inside Syria in 2013. He coordinated humanitarian assistance after the 2023 Turkey–Syria earthquakes. In December 2024, after fall of the Assad regime, Moustafa reported the discovery of a mass grave near Damascus containing at least 100,000 bodies, believed to be victims of Bashar al-Assad's Ba'athist regime. He emphasized the need to secure these sites to preserve evidence for future investigations.

In 2023, he received the James W. Foley Freedom Award (humanitarian award).

== Media and commentary ==
He has provided commentary in the media on issues involving Syria. He was featured in the documentary film Red Lines that depicts the civil war in Syria and his efforts to raise international support for the Syrian revolution and to promote democracy in the Middle East.

In 2024, Moustafa raised concerns about the nomination of Tulsi Gabbard to be the Director of National Intelligence.

== Criticism ==
A July 2025 Middle East Forum article criticizes Moustafa and the Syrian Emergency Task Force (SETF) for their inconsistent advocacy, alleging they shifted from condemning Bashar al-Assad's atrocities to supporting Ahmed al-Sharaa's regime, a former al-Qaeda affiliate, despite ongoing sectarian violence against Alawites and Druze. The article highlights SETF's selective outrage, downplaying massacres when perpetrated by the new government while condemning similar acts under Assad, and accuses Moustafa of ties to Islamist networks, including the Muslim Brotherhood, and allegedly endorsing terrorist groups via social media. The article questions SETF's transformation from a temporary humanitarian group into a permanent lobbying force that pushes for U.S. sanctions relief for Syria, potentially aligning American policy with Islamist agendas under the guise of promoting democracy.
