= Fareed al-Madhhan =

Syrian officer with the rank of First Assistant

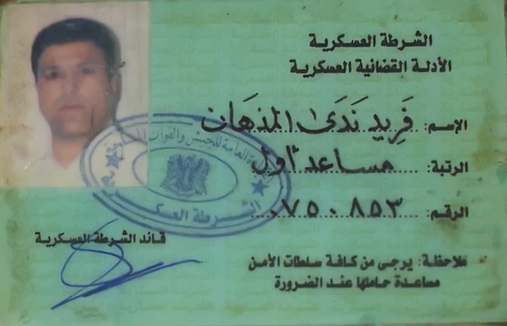
The military identity of Fareed al-Madhhan

Fareed Nada al-Madhhan (Arabic: فريد ندى المذهان, romanized: Farīd Nadá almdhhān) is a former Syrian officer with the rank of First Warrant Officer. He held the position of Head of the Judicial Evidence Office in the Military Police in Damascus and was the officer who leaked photos of victims in the Syrian regime's detention centers during Bashar al-Assad's rule amid the Syrian revolution, under the alias Caesar.

== History ==
Caesar is the alias of a former forensic photographer for the Syrian Military Police who fled Syria with approximately 45,000 photographs taken between 2011 and 2013. The most prominent of these images depict torture and deaths in Syrian regime prisons, showing the bodies of 6,786 prisoners, 4,025 civilians killed outside prison, and 1,036 military personnel.

These photos were verified, studied, classified, and analyzed in the laboratories of legal institutions and courts. These documents enabled Syrian families to search for the fate of their loved ones who had been arrested by the regime's secret services or were victims of enforced disappearance. Human rights organizations also used these documents to prepare reports on detention conditions in Syria. Additionally, they were utilized by the United Nations and courts, particularly in the Al-Khatib trial in Koblenz, Germany.

== Photographer in the Syrian Army ==
Madhhan worked as a photographer in the Documentation Unit of the Syrian Military Police before the revolution. His job was to photograph scenes of crimes and incidents involving military personnel. The situation began in March 2011, with the arrival of the bodies of protesters from Daraa, victims of the regime's security forces' repression. It continued with more and more bodies of detainees. Throughout this entire period, he, like his colleagues, photographed the bodies of several thousand detainees who died under torture, sometimes reaching up to 50 per day. The bodies he photographed in the Mezzeh and Tishreen military hospitals came from 24 security centers in the Damascus Governorate. Madhhan was responsible for photographing only men, not women or children. The Syrian government likely knew his real identity because there were only a limited number of military photographers in their ranks.

Each deceased person has numbers that must be visible in the photos. Upon arrival at the hospital, each body carries the inmate's number and the branch number where they died. These numbers are written with a marker, either on a sticker placed on the forehead or chest, or directly on the skin. Then, the forensic doctor, Madhhan's superior, assigns a third number to each body for the medical report, which is used for classification and archiving.

The number of bodies and their condition (broken teeth, deep wounds, gouged-out eyes, burns, cuts, bloody bodies, etc.) that he was forced to photograph left no room for doubt about the regime's violations. In the spring of 2011, he began thinking about fleeing and confided in his close friend, Osama Othman, about his desire. Othman, who was in contact with opposition groups, convinced Madhhan to continue his work and gather as many photos as possible. He agreed and began copying all his photos and those of his department, saving them on several USB drives, secretly risking his life for two years.

== Smuggling and protection ==
In 2013, after realizing that suspicion was beginning to weigh heavily on him, he fled with the help of Othman, who contacted a member of the Free Syrian Army. He arrived in Jordan and then found refuge in Europe, carrying with him 45,000 photos.

Until the fall of the Assad regime, he feared for retaliation against him and his remaining family in Syria if his identity were found: "I will be killed if the Syrian authorities find me." The alias "Caesar" was therefore used to protect his identity and ensure the security of him and his remaining family in Syria. Othman, meanwhile adopted the pseudonym "Sami".

Caesar, while his identity was still unknown, disguised himself with a hat and sunglasses and agreed to testify before the United Nations and the U.S. Congress.

Madhhan later revealed himself in an interview with Al Jazeera in February 2025.

In December 2025, he was awarded the Franco-German Prize for Human Rights and the Rule of Law.

== Caesar's photos ==
=== Authentication ===
The photos taken by Caesar were handed over to the Syrian National Current, an opposition political movement established in Turkey. To authenticate them, Qatar commissioned a law firm in London, Carter-Ruck & Partners. The firm appointed three former international prosecutors—Sir Desmond de Silva, former Chief Prosecutor of the Special Court for Sierra Leone; Sir Geoffrey Nice, former Chief Prosecutor in the trial of Slobodan Milošević; and professor David Crane, who indicted then-president of Liberia Charles Taylor—along with three experts in medical anthropology. They published a report in January 2014 confirming the authenticity of the photos taken by Caesar. According to David Crane, "These images prove the existence of a killing industry that we haven't seen since the Holocaust."

In 2017, the German justice system once again examined all the photos through an independent team, including forensic medical specialists.

=== Conclusion and definitions ===
The Syrian National Current first announced the existence of 55,000 photos taken by Caesar, along with 11,000 bodies from detention centers. However, these figures were clarified: the 45,000 photos do not all depict the bodies of detainees. Of Caesar's 18,000 photos, 1,036 show the bodies of soldiers, most of whom were killed in battle, and 4,025 civilians, the majority of whom were killed in their homes. The remaining 28,000 photos concern prisoners who died in the regime's prisons. Each body was photographed four times, and a total of 6,786 victims who died in prison were recorded.

The photos of the detainees were taken in two locations: the morgue at Tishreen Hospital in Damascus, and a section of the military hospital 601 in Mezzeh, near the presidential palace and behind the French high school in Damascus. The victims came from 24 detention locations in Damascus, but more than 80% of the bodies were from Branches 215 and 227 of the Military Intelligence Directorate alone. Among the 6,786 victims counted, 2,936 suffered from malnutrition and starvation, 2,769 bore signs of torture, and 455 had their eyes gouged out. (Caesar was responsible for photographing only men).

The file containing 4,000 photos of civilians killed outside prison is labeled "The Terrorists." According to French journalist Garance Le Caisne, it includes photos of elderly individuals and children, shot in the back of the head.

Human Rights Watch, a non-governmental organization, examined 28,707 of these photos. Thanks to cross-referencing with all available information, the organization confirmed that at least 6,786 prisoners died while detained or after being transferred from detention centers to military hospitals. The NGO conducted interviews with former detainees and families of the disappeared. It examined several cases of individuals whose faces could be identified in the photos, recognizing 27 people and revealing the names of 8 of them (many families refuse to release the names due to fear of retaliation), in a report published in December 2015. Dozens of missing persons' families and individuals who had been detained by the regime were able to identify their loved ones in the photos leaked by Caesar and learned of their deaths. Some of these deaths were later confirmed through death notices issued by the regime in the spring and summer of 2018.

In Syria, the Free Lawyers Association helps the families of the disappeared search for their loved ones, thanks to testimonies from all former detainees who were released and can be interviewed. This involves gathering information about individuals still in detention or who died while in custody, as well as comparing photos of missing persons, which their relatives entrusted to Caesar's leaked images.

A portion of the previously unpublished photos was released online in 2020, and thousands of Syrians again spent hours scrutinizing the images. A father died from a heart attack after recognizing his son in one of the photos.

In June 2020, Imad al-Din Rashid, founder of the Syrian Association for the Disappeared and Prisoners of Conscience, which monitors the conditions of war victims and prisoners in Syria, announced that 731 relatives of victims had contacted his organization. He added that 85% of them shared personal information about the victims, and half of them were also willing to testify in court.

=== International reactions ===
On 12 January 2014, the file was presented behind closed doors to 11 foreign ministers. After the meeting, French Minister of Foreign Affairs and International Development, Laurent Fabius, confided to one of his colleagues, "It is horrific. Disturbing. And we must work to uncover the truth regarding all these critically important documents." One of his relatives added, "These are images we haven't seen since the Jewish genocide and the Khmer Rouge crimes. The method in which the Syrian regime documents and categorizes its crimes takes us back 70 years."

The French diplomacy remarked, "Thousands of horrifying images, documented by numerous experts, showing tortured and starving bodies in the regime's prisons—testify to the systematic brutality of Bashar al-Assad's regime."

=== Justice ===
Based primarily on the documents leaked by Caesar and the testimonies, the French Public Prosecutor's Office opened a preliminary investigation into the war crimes committed by Bashar al-Assad's regime. In January 2015, Bashar al-Assad denied the existence of the military photographer, stating: "Who took these photos? Who is he? No one knows. These pieces of evidence have not been verified. These are claims with no evidence."

Among the death notices issued by the Syrian regime in the summer of 2018, the names of two Syrian-French citizens, Mazen and Patrick Dabbagh, were included. Following a family complaint in France and based on information from the "Caesar file", this allowed the French judiciary to issue three arrest warrants against regime figures accused of involvement in these deaths.

At the beginning of 2019, an investigation based specifically on the photos provided by Caesar led to the arrest of a torture suspect in France and two others in Germany. The three were alleged former agents of the Syrian regime's intelligence services, accused of committing acts of torture, crimes against humanity, and complicity, between 2011 and 2013 in Syria. A hundred photos leaked by Caesar represented detainees who died in Syrian General Intelligence Branch 251 during the time Anwar Raslan was its head. Caesar's photos enabled investigators to examine the bodies for signs that could help identify each branch of the intelligence agencies involved. Former colonel Anwar Raslan, head of the investigation branch, a secret service prison where detainees were interrogated, was sentenced to lifelong imprisonment in Germany in 2022 on charges of crimes against humanity.

In 2017, Sami provided 27,000 high-quality photos of detainees held by the Syrian regime to the German Prosecutor's Office. German investigators commissioned an independent forensic service to analyze all the images. Due to the brutality of the photos and their content, the work continued for two years. The analyses then allowed the comparison of visible marks on the bodies of 6,812 individuals with testimonies from survivors of torture. These analyses were subsequently made available to any European prosecutors who requested them.

=== Association of victims' families ===
Hundreds of thousands of Syrians, among the photos published by various human rights organizations, are trying to identify their missing or detained loved ones who were held by the regime. The Free Lawyers Association in Syria assists families in their legal procedures. To support each other, many families decided to establish an association. On 26 January 2018, World Day in Support of Victims of Torture, the Caesar Families Association was founded. According to its press release, the association aims to help the families of victims recover the remains of their loved ones so they can bury them, provide emotional and psychological support to the families in their search for the fate of detainees and the disappeared, and hold those responsible accountable before the courts.
