= Caesar Syria Civilian Protection Act =

US legislation that sanctions the Syrian government for war crimes

The Caesar Syria Civilian Protection Act of 2019, also known as the Caesar Act, was United States legislation that sanctioned the former Syrian government, including the former Syrian president Bashar al-Assad, for war crimes against the Syrian population. The act was signed into law by President Trump in December 2019 and came into force on June 17, 2020. On 18 December 2025, a little over a year after the fall of the Assad Regime, the National Defense Authorization Act for Fiscal Year 2026 repealed the Caesar Act.

Caesar sanctions were intended to create accountability for crimes by the Syrian government and its allies Russia and Iran. Sanctions were also to discourage foreign investors from doing business with the Syrian government, in an effort not to reward war crimes. The sanctions severely affected the Syrian economy, especially its construction, finance and energy sectors, and complicated the reconstruction efforts.

== Implementation, requirements and exemptions ==
Caesar sanctions were purposed to financially punish Assad and his associates for committing atrocities. Hence, the sanctions would mainly target providing goods, services, technology, information, or any support that would expand local production in the field of natural gas, oil and its derivatives. The sanctions also aimed to deter foreign investors from signing contracts for reconstruction following the civil war.

A number of Syrian operated industries, including those related to infrastructure, military maintenance and energy production, were targeted. The act also targeted individuals and businesses who provided funding or assistance to the former president of Syria. Iranian and Russian entities were addressed for their governments' support of Assad in the Syrian Civil War. The legislation imposed fresh sanctions on entities conducting business with the Syrian government and its military and intelligence agencies. It also aimed to encourage negotiations by allowing the president of the United States to waive sanctions if the parties were engaged in meaningful negotiations and the violence against civilians had ceased.

Caesar sanctions were implemented on 17 June 2020, six months after its signature into a law. Sanctions by the US State Department targeted 39 members of the al-Assad regime. The requirements of the legislation would expire after five years, i.e. 2025. However, Section 401 of the Caesar Bill outlines six requirements to lift U.S. sanctions on Syria:

1. End to Syrian and Russian aircraft bombing civilians.
2. Iranian, Syrian and Russian forces, as well as entities connected to them, no longer restrict humanitarian access to besieged areas and allow for civilians to leave freely.
3. All political prisoners were released, and the appropriate international human rights organizations given full access to Syria's prisons and detention facilities.
4. Bombing of “medical facilities, schools, residential areas, and community gathering places, including markets” by Syrian, Russian, Iranian forces, as well as entities connected to them, had ceased.
5. The possibility for the “safe, voluntary, and dignified return of Syrians displaced by the conflict” was achieved.
6. Accountability for “perpetrators of war crimes in Syria and justice for victims of war crimes committed by the Assad regime, including by participation in a credible and independent truth and reconciliation process.”

American envoy to the northeast Syria, William Robak, mentioned that the sanctions would exclude the areas of the Autonomous Administration of North and East Syria.

== Debate over measure ==
=== Regional ramifications ===
In May 2020, the Syrian authorities imposed heavy taxes on president's cousin, Rami Makhlouf, and seized his assets in order to find resources prior to the implementation of Caesar Act.

In early June, the Syrian lira underwent a dramatic collapse. The US Government stated via US envoy James Jeffrey that the collapse would be exacerbated due to sanctions, and offered to help President Bashar al-Assad if he agreed to meet certain conditions for political reform.

On June 10, hundreds of protesters returned to the streets of As-Suwayda for the fourth consecutive day, rallying against the collapse of the country's economy, as the Syrian pound plummeted to 3,000 to the dollar within the past week.

On June 11, Prime Minister Imad Khamis was dismissed by President Bashar al-Assad, amid anti-government protests over deteriorating economic conditions. The new lows for the Syrian currency, and the dramatic increase in sanctions, began to appear to raise new threats to the survival of the Assad government.

Neighboring countries might have been affected from sanctions such as Jordan.

Analysts noted that a resolution to the current banking crisis in Lebanon might be crucial to restoring stability in Syria.

Some analysts began to raise concerns that Assad might be on the verge of losing power; but that any such collapse in the regime might cause conditions to worsen, as the result might be mass chaos, rather than an improvement in political or economic conditions. Russia continued to expand its influence and military role in the areas of Syria where the main military conflict was occurring.

On June 23, Syrian Foreign Minister, Walid Muallem, held a press conference and mentioned that the United States sought to "starve the people" and the sanctions would open the door for "terrorism" to return; in addition, he insisted that the Syrian government will cope with the sanctions with the assistance from friends and allies.

=== International debate ===
Analysts noted that the implementation of new heavy sanctions under the US Caesar Act could devastate the Syrian economy, ruin any chances of recovery, destroy regional stability, and do nothing but destabilize the entire region.

An analyst, Julien Barnes-Dacey, director of the Middle East and North Africa Programme at the European Council on Foreign Relations, said:

“Assad was absolutely the prime driver of Syria’s ongoing collapse. [But] the US position now appears to be fundamentally driven by great power politics and the goal of ensuring that Russia and Iran can’t claim a win. My fear was that Caesar will achieve the exact opposite of its stated goals, fuelling the worst impulses of the Syrian regime and wider conflict. The US self-declared maximum pressure campaign aims to bring the regime to its knees and force its backers to concede defeat but the regime knows how to brutally hold onto power and it’s clear that its key backers aren’t for moving."

“The Syrian people have been brutalised for a decade now and the country was devastated by conflict but we appear to be staring into the precipice of a dangerous new stage of the conflict … which risks a devastating new unravelling.”

Russia and the United States continuously argued publicly over the role played by each country in Syrian politics. Russia noted that its military presence had the approval of Syria's government.

Some analysts said that Assad would need support from major Sunni countries to stay in power, and that he would need the US to facilitate such support.

In the aftermath of the 2023 Turkey–Syria earthquake, some members of the international community increasingly demanded the lifting of sanctions against Syria, including the Caesar sanctions. Some NGOs said that such sanctions "hurt civilians and humanitarian efforts".

== Legislative history ==
=== Origin ===
This legislation was named after an individual known as Caesar, who documented torture against civilians by Assad's government, which was to become known as the 2014 Syrian detainee report or Caesar Report. Human Rights Watch (HRW) further investigated this report, and produced an additional report titled If the Dead Could Speak. Photographic evidence from the 2014 Syrian detainee report has been on display at the United States Holocaust Museum and at the United Nations.

The Caesar Syria Civilian Protection Act of 2019 became a part of the National Defense Authorization Act for Fiscal Year 2020 (S1790) as House of Representatives report 116–333. The House Committee Report containing the Caesar provision passed the Senate on December 17, 2019, with bipartisan support from both chambers of United States Congress. The bill was signed by President Donald Trump and became law on December 20, 2019.

The legislation was reintroduced by Representative Eliot Engel as House Resolution 31 of 2019, and it was passed in the House on January of the same year. It was later incorporated into the National Defense Authorization Act which was enacted and then signed by President Trump.

HR 31 was amended by the Senate Committee on Foreign Relations on June 3, 2019, to include congressional briefings by the President of military means meant to protect civilians, and obtaining data from organizations and countries in relation to Syria.

=== Past versions ===
Past versions of the bill included surveying the proposal of instituting no-fly zones over Syria.

The Caesar Syria Civilian Protection Act of 2016 was a long-waited act drafted by the United States Congress by both Democrats and Republicans during a lame duck session sanctioning the Syrian government. On November 15, 2016, it passed the House unanimously as The Caesar Syria Civilian Protection Act (HR 5732).

This version of legislation would also have required the U.S. president to report to Congress on the prospects for a no-fly zone in Syria. The bill would have authorized the Secretary of State to support entities that are collecting and preserving evidence for the eventual prosecution of those who committed war crimes and crimes against humanity in Syria from March 2011 to the present, and would have required the President to report to Congress on the names of those who are responsible for or complicit in gross violations of human rights of the Syrian people.

HR5732 was reintroduced into the 115th Congress as HR1677. This bill passed the House but stalled in the Senate. It was reintroduced into the next Congress as HR31.

=== Related bills ===
Stop UN Support for Assad Act and No Assistance for Assad Act were related U.S. congressional bills that have died in previous Congresses.

Stop UN Support for Assad Act (HR4868 of 116th Congress) sought to prevent the UN from directing funds to the Assad government, which funds were used as weaponization of aid. The UN mandates that humanitarian aid to Syria, even by non-governmental organizations (NGO's) be provided through the Syrian government, led by Assad, who was alleged to have misused it.

No Assistance for Assad Act has been introduced into the House of Representatives twice, but has failed to become passed into law. This bill was intended to prevent funding reconstruction of Syrian regime-held areas until war crimes were verified as halted.

=== Expiration and renewal ===
On 20 December 2024, the Caesar Syria Civilian Protection Act expired due to its "sunset" clause that mentioned the Act would cease to be effective on the date that was 5 years after the date of the enactment. Following the fall of the Assad regime, the Syrian caretaker government repeatedly called for the removal of all economic sanctions against Syria so that the country can start reconstruction on its infrastructure after 13 years of civil war left the country in ruins.

On 23 December, the Biden administration signed the National Defense Authorization Act 2025 (NDAA 2025) into law, renewing the Caesar Act for another five years, until 2029. The Syrian American Council had successfully lobbied for the sanctions to be attached to the NDAA to maintain pressure on Assad's economy, but failed to have them removed from the legislation in time after Assad's ouster from power.

=== Suspension and repeal ===
In May 2025, the Trump administration issued a 180-day waiver under the Caesar Syria Civilian Protection Act, easing certain sanctions to support humanitarian relief and early recovery efforts in Syria. The waiver was extended for an additional 180 days in November 2025 following meetings between U.S. officials and Syrian President Ahmed al-Sharaa, signaling a shift toward conditional engagement while retaining legal pressure mechanisms.

Separately, legislation specifically targeting repeal of the Caesar Act, including H.R. 3941 introduced during the 119th United States Congress, was introduced but had not advanced independently through Congress as of December 2025.

In December 2025, the United States Congress voted to repeal the Caesar Act as part of the National Defense Authorization Act for Fiscal Year 2026. According to France 24, the repeal passed the Senate by a vote of 77–20 after prior approval by the House of Representatives and was sent to President for signature. The repeal was signed on 18 December 2025 by U.S. President Donald Trump as part of the NDAA 2026.

== Notable sanctioned individuals ==
- Rami Makhlouf
- Wassim al-Qattan

== See also ==
- Countering America's Adversaries Through Sanctions Act
- Magnitsky Act
- Office of Foreign Assets Control
- Syria–European Union relations
- Syria–United States relations
- Arab normalization with Syria
- Timeline of the Syrian Civil War
