= Shami Hospital =

Geography
- Location: Damascus, Syria
- Coordinates: 33°31′12.08″N 36°16′5.88″E

Organisation
- Type: General

History
- Opened: 1981

Links
- Website: shamihospital.com
- Lists: Hospitals in Syria

Al-Shami Hospital (Arabic: مَشْفَى الشَّامِي, romanized: Mašfā aš-Šām) is a central hospital in Al-Malky street, Damascus, Syria.
