= The Massabki Brothers =

Maronite Catholic saints from Damascus (died 1860)

Saints Massabki Brothers

Laymen; Martyrs
- Born: Fransīs Masābkī 'Abd-al-Mu'tī Masābkī; Rūfayīl Masābkī; Damascus, Syria
- Died: 10 July 1860; Damascus, Syria
- Venerated in: Catholic Church, Maronite Church
- Beatified: 10 October 1926, Saint Peter's Basilica, Rome, Kingdom of Italy by Pope Pius XI
- Canonized: 20 October 2024, Saint Peter's Basilica by Pope Francis
- Feast: 10 July
- Attributes: Palm branch

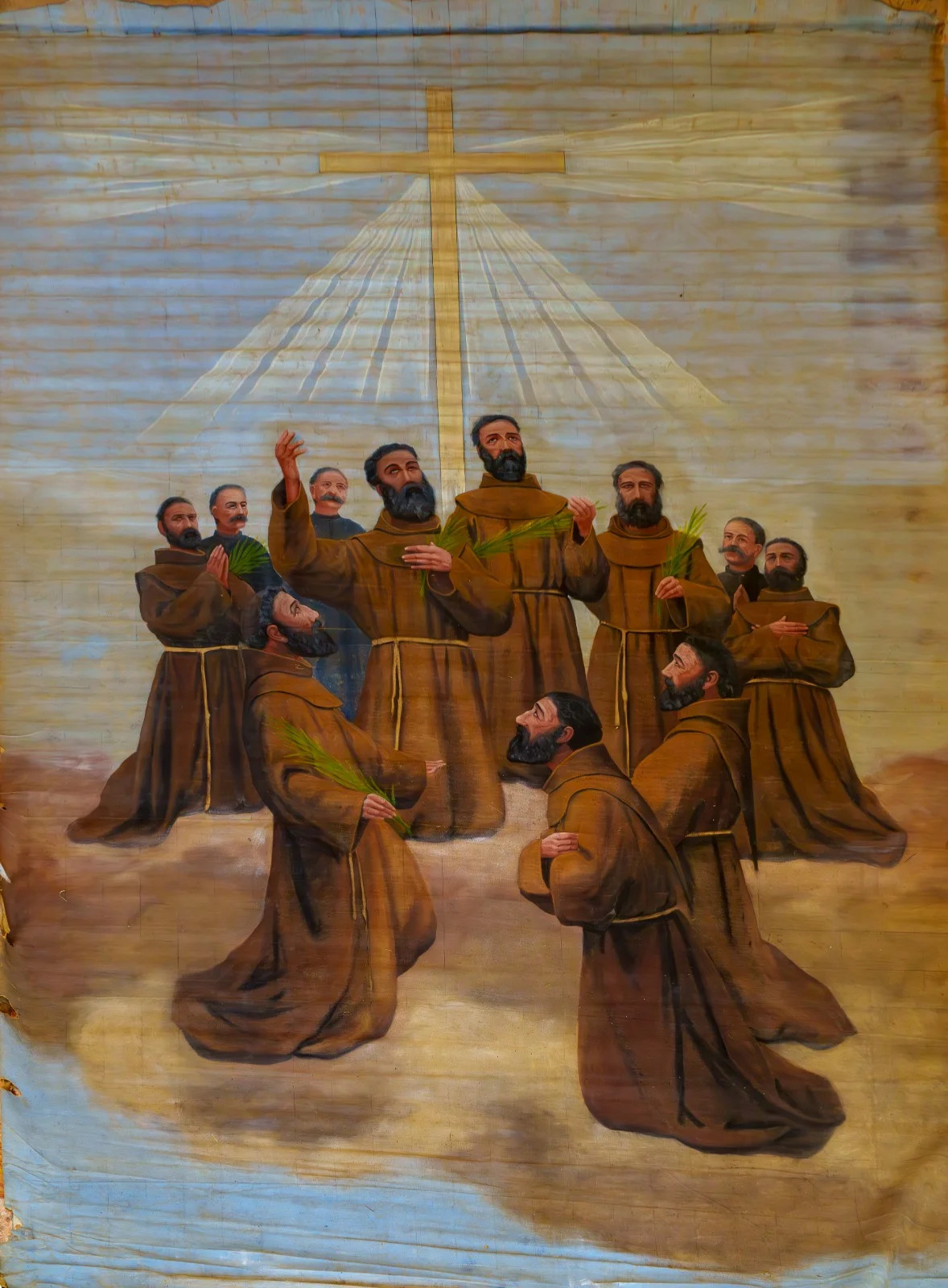
The three brothers were amongst the martyrs of Damascus

The Massabki Brothers (Arabic: الأخوة المسابكيين), Abdel Moati Massabki, Francis Massabki and Raphael Massabki were three Maronite Catholics from Damascus, Syria. The three brothers were sons of Nehme Massabki.

On 10 July 1860, the brothers were killed because of their religion while praying inside a Franciscan church in Damascus, during the 1860 civil conflict in Mount Lebanon and Damascus. They were beatified in 1926 and canonized in 2024.

== Beatification and canonization processes ==
Pope Pius XI proclaimed the beatification of the three brothers in 1926.

On 18 December 2022, the Maronite patriarch Bechara Boutros al-Rahi announced that the Massabki Brothers would be recognized as saints without the need for a miracle because they were martyrs of the faith.

On July 1st 2024, Pope Francis presided at an Ordinary Consistory of Cardinals, which approved the canonization of 15 people, including The Massabki Brothers. In the Apostolic Palace for an Ordinary Public Consistory, Cardinal Marcello Semeraro presented 'Peroratio', a report on the lives and miracles of The Massabki Brothers, among others.

The brothers were canonized on 20 October 2024 along with 11 other new Saints.

== See also ==
- Martyrs of Damascus
