= Thanaa Debsi =

Syrian actress (1941–2024)

- ثناء دبسي
- Born: 22 June 1941; Aleppo, Syria
- Died: 20 February 2024 (aged 82); Damascus, Syria
- Occupation: Actress
- Years active: 1963–2024
- Spouse: Salim Sabri (m. 1964)
- Children: 3

Thanaa Debsi (Arabic: ثناء دبسي; 22 June 1941 – 20 February 2024) was a Syrian actress.

== Biography ==
Born in Aleppo, on 22 June 1941, Debsi began acting in films from 1963 and joined the Syrian Order of Artists in 1968. She then married the Syrian actor Salim Sabri. The couple had three children, the eldest is Reem born in 1965, the second is Yara, who is working in the film industry and the third is the only son Thayer. She was the sister of Saraa Debsi and the great-aunt of the Syrian actress Hanouf Kharboutli.

Debsi died in Damascus on 20 February 2024, at the age of 82.

== Filmography ==
=== On television ===
- الشمس تشرق من جديد (The Sun shines again)
- سيرة آل جلالي (Biography of Al-Jalil)
- البيت القديم (The old house)
- القناع (The mask)
- غزلان في غابة الذئاب (Deer in the Forest of Wolves)
- قوس قزح (Rainbow)
- الميراث (Inheritance)
- الواهمون (Al-Wahmon)
- عشاء الوداع (Farewell dinner)
- عصي الدمع (Hard Tears)
- زمن العار (Time of Shame)
- وراء الشمس (Behind the Sun)
- الزعيم (The leader)
- بنات العيلة (Daughters of Eila)

=== Theatre ===
- الأشجار تموت واقفة (Trees die standing)
- الأشباح (The Ghosts)
- التنين (The Dragon)
- رجل القدر (Man of Fate)
