= Mezzeh Air Base =

Former military air base in Syria

Mezzeh Air Base مطار المزة العسكري
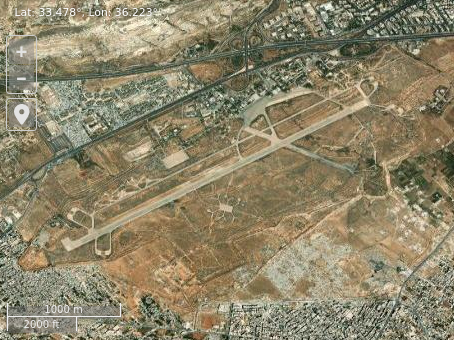
- Satellite imagery of Mezzeh air base before destruction
- IATA: none; ICAO: OS67

Summary
- Airport type: Civilian airport (since 2025); Military (until 2024)
- Operator: General Authority of Civil Aviation (since 2025)
- Location: Mezzeh, Damascus, Syria
- In use: Planned future use
- Elevation AMSL: 2,407 ft (734 m)
- Coordinates: 33°28′40″N 36°13′24″E

Map
- Location in Syria

Runways
Direction	Length		Surface
Direction	ft	m	Surface
1	8,258	2,517

Mezzeh Air Base (Arabic: مطار المزة العسكري; also spelled Mazzeh) is an air base located in Mezzeh, Damascus, Syria, south-west of the old centre of Damascus. It had one runway of 8,258 feet (2,517 m) length, at elevation 2,407 feet (734 m).

== History ==
During World War II the Mazzeh airfield was a military base for the Vichy French air force, which also permitted Germany to use its bases. On 19 May 1941, British aircraft attacked the airfield, destroying some modern Potez 63 aircraft as well some older Potez 25 biplanes.

After Syrian independence in 1946, Mazzeh became a base for the Syrian Air Force. "By the end of 1957 the SAF had two operational MiG-17 squadrons defending the capital from their base at al-Mezze near Damascus." In 1966, it became also the Defense Companies headquarters.

On 13 October 1973, during the Yom Kippur War, the Israeli Air Force bombed al-Mazzah airbase, targeting helicopters and infrastructure to disrupt Syrian troop movements.

=== Syrian civil war ===
In mid-2013 the airbase was described by the BBC as "an important strategic installation [which] plays a significant role in distributing the government's military supplies." Reuters reported in mid-2013 that it was "used by Syria's elite Republican Guard, Special Forces and Air Force Intelligence, [and] also serves as a private airport for the Assad family." It also said that during the Syrian civil war the base was "used to fire rockets and artillery at rebellious Sunni Muslim neighbourhoods on the edge of the capital." Mezzeh Air Base was also used by the Syrian regime as a jail to imprison opponents during the Syrian civil war. Various inquiries and investigations reported that acts of torture and possible war crimes were committed in the jails of Mezzeh Air Base.

The airbase was subject to an attack that was blamed on Israel by Syrian authorities on 13 January 2017.

=== Post-Assad regime and conversion to civilian airport ===
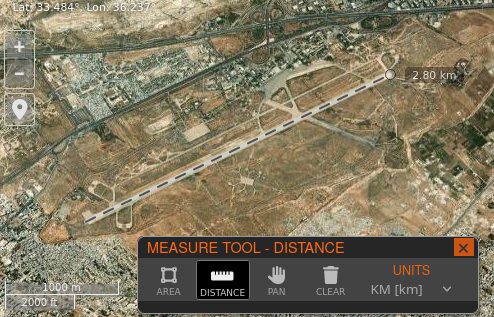
NASA's FIRMS shows runway 06/24 to be 2.80 km

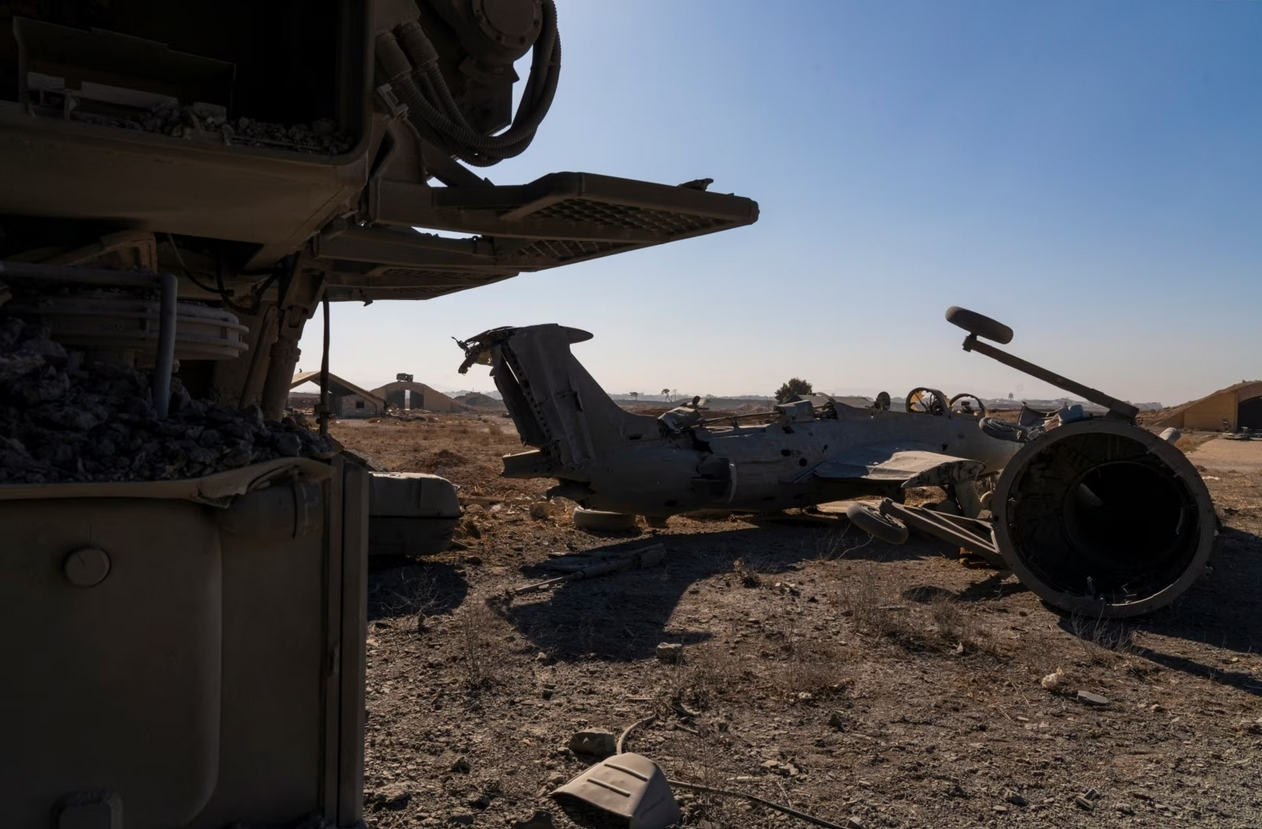
The destroyed wreckage of an Aero L-29 at Mezzeh base following an Israeli airstrike on 19 December, 2024

On 8 December 2024, shortly after Damascus fell, it was targeted by Israeli airstrikes, most likely to prevent the appropriation of strategic weapons by Syrian rebels, destroying it.

In July 2025, the General Authority of Civil Aviation announced that the airbase will be converted into a civilian airport, primarily intended for private aircraft operations. However, these plans have met backlash and protest due to concerns over suspected mass graves present at the site and land rights - the site of Mezzeh Air Base was originally owned by hundreds of private citizens before the airport was built on it in 1956, which the Assads then retroactively justified with expropriation decrees.

== See also ==
- List of Syrian Air Force bases
