= Wassim al-Qattan =

Syrian businessman

- وسيم القطان
- Born: March 4, 1976 (age 50)
- Occupation: Businessperson
- Known for: Muruj Cham Investment and Tourism Group, Adam Trading and Investment LLC

Wassim Anwar al-Qattan (Arabic: وسيم أنور القطان; born March 4, 1976), also known as Wassim Qattan, is a Syrian businessman who held several contracts with the Ba'athist Government of Syria to develop government-owned shopping malls and hotel properties in Damascus, Syria. He was President of the Rif Dimashq Chamber of Commerce. He was reportedly close to Maher al-Assad, the brother of former Syrian president Bashar al-Assad.

In February 2020, the European Union sanctioned al-Qattan for providing material support to the Ba'athist Syrian government. In July 2020, the US Department of Treasury sanctioned Wassim al-Qattan and entities associated with him for "providing material assistance in support of the Government of Syria". The Treasury alleged that al-Qattan had ties to regime figures and held several contracts with the Syrian government to invest in and manage government-owned shopping malls and hotels in Damascus. Al-Qattan's reaction to the US Treasury sanctions was to celebrate on Facebook, describing them as a "third package of medals". He is also sanctioned by the UK Treasury.

== Background ==
Wassim al-Qattan is a Sunni from Damascus, Syria. Before 2011, he worked in an administrative position in Syriatel. In 2017, Al-Qattan was assigned the management contract of the Qassioum Shopping Mall, at an annual cost of SYB 1.2 billion. In 2018, the Syrian Ministry of Tourism awarded him a 45-year contract to develop prime real estate in Damascus, and management of the Massa Plaza mall.
