= 2014 Syrian detainee report =

Documented evidence about crimes against humanity in Syria

The 2014 Syrian detainee report, also known as the Caesar Report, formally titled A Report into the credibility of certain evidence with regard to Torture and Execution of Persons Incarcerated by the current Syrian regime, is a report that claims to detail "the systematic killing of more than 11,000 detainees by the Syrian government in one region during the Syrian Civil War over a two and half year period from March 2011 to August 2013". It was released on 21 January 2014, a day before talks were due to begin at the Geneva II Conference on Syria, and was commissioned by the government of Qatar. Qatar has been a key funder of the rebels in Syria. The Syrian government questioned the report due to its ties to hostile sides against the Syrian government and pointed to how many of the photos were identified as casualties among international terrorists fighting the Syrian government or Syrian army troops or civilians massacred by them due to supporting the Syrian government.

Human Rights Watch (HRW) concluded after a six month investigation that the photographic evidence in the report was genuine. The ensuing HRW report based on the Caesar Report was titled, If the Dead Could Speak. This report published on 16 December 2015 said that Syrian officials should be tried for crimes against humanity.

The Caesar Report led to U.S. sanctions on Syria under the Global Magnitsky Act in 2012, and under the Caesar Syria Civilian Protection Act in 2020. The Caesar Act was passed under the U.S. Senate National Defense Authorization Act for Fiscal Year 2020 (S. 1709) through a committee report by the U.S. House of Representatives.

== Source of evidence ==
The source, who for security reasons was identified only as Caesar, was at the time a photographer with the Syrian military police who worked secretly with a Syrian opposition group, the Syrian National Movement. In 2025, after the fall of the Assad regime, the whistleblower revealed his identity as Farid Nada al-Madhan. His job was "taking pictures of killed detainees" at just two military hospitals in Damascus. He told war crimes investigators that he used to be a forensic investigator. But once the Syrian uprising began, his job became documenting the corpses of those killed in Syrian military prisons. He did not claim to have witnessed executions or torture. But he did describe a highly bureaucratic system. The bodies would then be buried in rural areas. He began making duplicates of his photo evidence in September 2011 and sending them on thumb drives to a relative who fled Syria and was working with human rights groups. After sharing thousands of images, he feared for his safety and was smuggled out of the country in August 2013.

The authors of the report who interviewed him found him credible and truthful and his account "most compelling" after subjecting it to "rigorous scrutiny".

== Authors ==
The authors of the report are:

- Desmond Lorenz de Silva, former chief prosecutor of the Special Court for Sierra Leone.
- Geoffrey Nice, former lead prosecutor of former Yugoslavian president Slobodan Milosevic.
- David Crane, who indicted then-president of Liberia Charles Taylor at the Sierra Leone court.

Also involved in the report were three experienced forensic science experts, including evidence from a forensic pathologist, an anthropologist who investigated mass graves in Kosovo and an expert in digital images who examined and authenticated samples of 55,000 digital images, comprising about 11,000 victims.

== Content ==
The 31-page report, which was commissioned by a leading firm of London solicitors, examined thousands of Syrian government photographs and files recording deaths in the custody of government security forces. Most of the victims were young men and many corpses were emaciated, bloodstained and bore signs of torture. Some had eyes gouged out and others showed signs of strangulation or electrocution.

The report stated: "The reason for photographing executed persons was twofold. First to permit a death certificate to be produced without families requiring to see the body, thereby avoiding the authorities having to give a truthful account of their deaths; second to confirm that orders to execute individuals had been carried out." Families were told that the cause of death was either a "heart attack" or "breathing problems," it added. "The procedure for documentation was that when a detainee was killed each body was given a reference number which related to that branch of the security service responsible for his detention and death. When the corpse was taken to the military hospital it was given a further number so as to document, falsely, that death had occurred in the hospital. Once the bodies were photographed, they were taken for burial in a rural area."

The photos were taken on the premises of the 601 Military Hospital in the Mezzeh district of Damascus.

== Implications ==
The report was made available to the UN, governments and human rights groups. Experts say the evidence is more detailed and on a far larger scale than anything else that has yet emerged from the Syrian conflict. As a result of the report it has been suggested that Syrian government officials could face war crimes charges in light of the evidence presented within.

This is solid evidence of the kind of machinery of cruel death that we haven't seen, frankly, since the Nazis. If it is as it appears thus far, we're talking about more than 10,000 individuals being killed in custody over the period from 2011 to 2013, including largely men but also some very, very young men and boys and women... It's shocking to me, as a prosecutor — I'm used to evidence not being so strong

— Stephen Rapp, Commission for International Justice and Accountability (CIJA)

The inquiry team said it was satisfied there was "clear evidence, capable of being believed by a tribunal of fact in a court of law, of systematic torture and killing of detained persons by the agents of the Syrian government. It would support findings of crimes against humanity and could also support findings of war crimes against the current Syrian regime."

De Silva told The Guardian that the evidence "documented industrial-scale killing," and added: "This is a smoking gun of a kind we didn't have before. It makes a very strong case indeed."

Crane said: "Now we have direct evidence of what was happening to people who had disappeared. This is the first provable, direct evidence of what has happened to at least 11,000 human beings who have been tortured and executed and apparently disposed of. This is amazing. This is the type of evidence a prosecutor looks for and hopes for. We have pictures, with numbers that marry up with papers with identical numbers – official government documents. We have the person who took those pictures. That's beyond-reasonable-doubt-type evidence."

A representative for Bashar al-Assad denied the images were even taken inside the country. But representatives of the U.S. State Department, British Foreign Secretary, Amnesty International and other bodies said the photographs are irrefutable testimony of widespread human rights abuses that could well rise to the level of war crimes.

Due to the report and other findings, the head of the UN Commission of Inquiry on Syria, Paulo Sérgio Pinheiro, stated, "The mass scale of deaths of detainees suggests that the Government of Syria is responsible for acts that amount to extermination as a crime against humanity".

== Related reports ==
According to a report by Amnesty International, published in November 2015, the Syrian government had forcibly disappeared more than 65,000 people (who were yet to be heard from) since the beginning of the Syrian Civil War. According to a report in May 2016 by the Syrian Observatory for Human Rights, at least 60,000 people were killed through torture or died from dire humanitarian conditions in Syrian government jails since March 2011.

=== If the Dead Could Speak ===
The HRW report If the Dead Could Speak corroborated the images and findings in the Caesar Report.

Human Rights Watch had released a torture report about the Assad government years before this, titled, "Torture Archipelago."

== Caesar Exhibit ==
The Caesar Exhibit is a high-profile exhibition showing photographic evidence of torture and death committed by the Assad government in Syria's prisons.

This exhibit is sponsored by the non-profit organization Syrian Emergency Task Force. The United States Holocaust Memorial Museum, European Parliament, UK Parliament, Harvard, Princeton, Yale and the UN have showcased this exhibit.

== Koblenz trial ==
Mostly on the base of the data from the Caesar Report, a universal jurisdiction trial under German law (German: Völkerstrafgesetzbuch) started on 23 April 2020 in the city of Koblenz in Germany. The trial had two defendants, former Syrian security servicemen, a colonel Anwar Raslan (57) and his aid, Eyad al-Gharib (43); both were working in the Branch 251 of the Syrian secret service in Damascus. As stated by prosecution, there was a prison just near the Branch 251 where 4,000 prisoners were tortured from April 2011 to September 2012 under Anwar Raslan's leadership.

On 13 January 2022, Raslan was sentenced by the state court in Koblenz to imprisonment for life "for a crime against humanity in the form of killing, torture, severe deprivation of liberty, rape and sexual coercion in unity of action with 27 counts of Mord ('severe' murder in the German penal code), 25 counts of dangerous bodily harm, two counts of especially serious rape, sexual coercion, 14 counts of deprivation of liberty for more than one week, two counts of hostage-taking and three counts of sexual abuse of prisoners."

== Criticism ==
Assad denies the findings of the Caesar Report. The pro-Assad group, Syria Solidarity Movement (SSM), claimed that reports made by many journalists about conditions of Assad's prisons were biased or false.

== See also ==
- Americans for a Free Syria
- For Sama
- Human rights in Syria
