= Mezzeh =

Mezzeh ٱلْمَزَّة
- Municipality
- Al Mazzeh
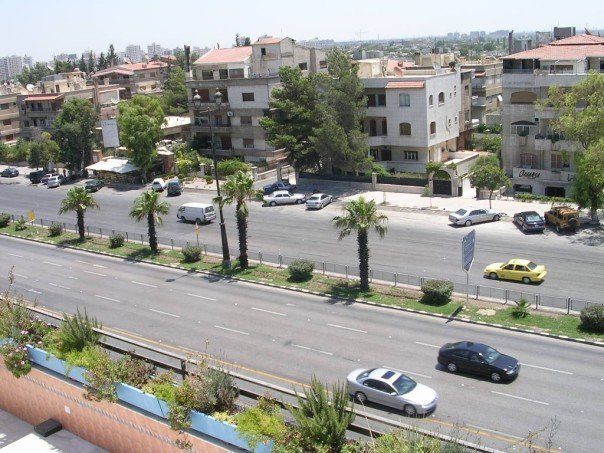
- Fayez Mansour Street (Mezzeh Highway)

- Location within Syria
- Coordinates: 33°30′11″N 36°15′30″E
- Country: Syria
- Governorate: Damascus Governorate
- City: Damascus

Population (2004)
  - Total: 123,313
- Time zone: UTC+3 (AST)
- Climate: BSk

Mezzeh (Arabic: ٱلْمَزَّة, romanized: al-Mazzah, also transcribed as al-Mazzah, el-Mazze, etc.) is a municipality in Damascus, Syria, due west of Kafr Sousa. It lies to the southwest of central Damascus, along the Mazzeh highway (also known as Fayez Mansour).

It started gaining importance when the French constructed Mezzeh Air Base, which was the main airport in Damascus until Damascus International Airport opened. It also held the notorious Mezzeh prison until 2000. The municipality includes the Damascus University and contains many foreign embassies. The current presidential palace sits atop Mount Mazzeh and overlooks all of Damascus. It is one of the most modern and expensive areas of Damascus, especially the areas along the highway.

== Districts ==
- Al-Jalaa (pop. 3,514)
- Western Villas (pop. 12,393)
- Eastern Villas (pop. 13,776)
- Mezzeh 86 (pop. 33,191)
- Mezzeh al-Qadimeh (Old Mezzeh or Shaykh Sa'ad) (pop. 13,555)
- Mezzeh Jabal (Mount Mezzeh) (pop. 22,655)
- Al-Rabwa (pop. 10,002)
- As-Soumariyah (pop. 14,227)

The Western and Eastern Villa districts along the highway are affluent and cosmopolitan. The primarily Alawite Mezzeh 86 district is comparatively poor and has been described as a slum.

== History ==
Mezzeh was originally a village outside of Damascus. In 300 AD, it appeared as Mezēs (Μεζὴς) in the Diocletianic boundary stones.

Local tradition holds that the modern village was founded during the Ummayad period (661-750) by Yemeni migrants. It was still a separate village at the time of the Ottoman conquest of Syria, and in 1535 it had a recorded population of 150 households, along with 35 bachelors and a resident Imam.

Mezzeh featured prominently in the 1941 Battle of Damascus. Compton Mackenzie later described it at the time as being "a large village standing at the junction of the road from Damascus to Beirut and Quneitra".

In 2012, during the Syrian civil war, residents participated in anti-government protests, resulting in arrests. In March 2012, the area experienced heavy fighting between government forces and defectors. The Alawite Mezzeh 86 neighborhood has been targeted by bombings of civilian and military targets.

In December 2024, the neighborhood gained notoriety for being identified as the place where Syrian revolutionary leader, Ahmed Al-Sharaa, had spent his childhood. Upon successfully capturing Damascus, Al-Sharaa toured the neighborhood and returned to his childhood home and respectfully asked the occupants to clear the place when possible so that his family could return after living in exile since the start of the Syrian revolution. While touring the neighborhood, Al-Sharaa got his hair cut at the local barbershop and took photos with locals.

== Notable buildings and structures ==
- Presidential Palace, Damascus
- Former Mezzeh prison
- Mezzeh Air Base
- Mezzeh Military Hospital (officially titled as Hospital 601); cited as the location of photographs submitted in the 2014 Syrian detainee report.
