= Presidency of Ahmed al-Sharaa =

Syrian presidential administration since 2025

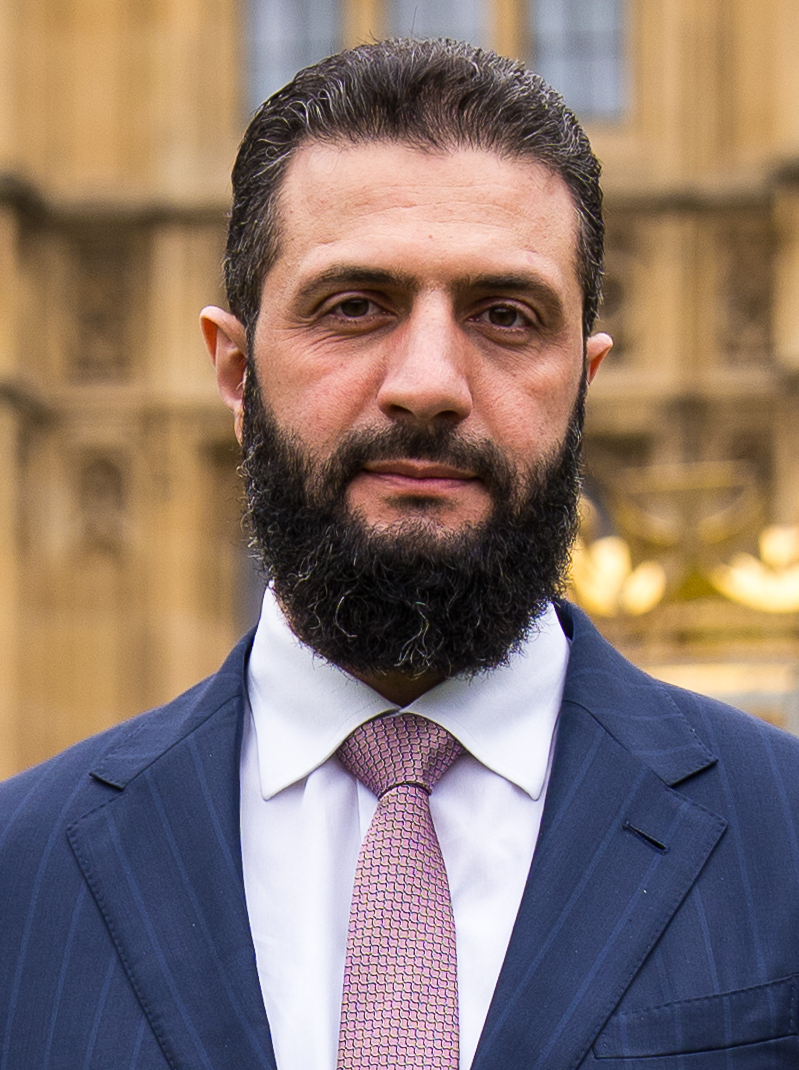
- Al-Sharaa in 2026
- Presidency of Ahmed al-Sharaa; 29 January 2025 – present
- President: Ahmed al-Sharaa
- Vice President: Vacant
- Prime Minister: Mohammed al-Bashir (2024–2025) (Note: From 10 December 2024 to 29 March 2025, Mohammed al-Bashir served as the Prime Minister of Syria under the Syrian caretaker government until al-Sharaa announced the formation of the Syrian transitional government, after which the position of Prime Minister was abolished.)
- Cabinet: Caretaker (2024–2025); Transitional (2025–present)
- Party: Independent
- Appointed by: Syrian General Command
- Seat: People's Palace, Damascus
- Emblem of Syria

Ahmed al-Sharaa's tenure as the president of Syria began on 29 January 2025, when he was officially appointed by the Syrian General Command at the Syrian Revolution Victory Conference, succeeding Bashar al-Assad. As mandated by the Constitutional Declaration, he is to serve as president for a five-year transitional period.

Al-Sharaa launched an 11-day military offensive against the Assad regime in November 2024, after which Assad fled to Russia as his government collapsed. He then became Syria's de facto leader, heading the Syrian caretaker government from 8 December 2024 until 29 January 2025, when he was formally appointed as the president of Syria. As president of Syria's transitional government, he prioritized consolidating authority, rebuilding state institutions, unifying armed factions, and restoring Syria's international relations, including ties with the United States, Russia, and other regional powers. He signed a constitutional declaration establishing a five-year transitional period that enshrined Islamic jurisprudence as the main source of legislation with plans to hold elections afterwards. In October 2025, a parliamentary election was held under al-Sharaa's administration, the first since the fall of the Ba'athist regime.

Extensive negotiations with the Kurdish-led Syrian Democratic Forces (SDF) to integrate their military and civil institutions into the state remained inconclusive throughout 2025. In 2026, following clashes in Aleppo between the transitional government and SDF forces, he issued a decree recognizing Syrian Kurds as an integral part of the Syrian people and recognized the Kurdish language. His administration launched a successful offensive against the SDF, beginning in eastern Aleppo Governorate around Deir Hafir and Maskanah before expanding into Raqqa, Deir ez-Zor, and al-Hasakah. The offensive ultimately resulted in a ceasefire and an integration agreement, culminating in the full integration of its civil institutions into the Syrian state and the dissolution of the SDF in August 2026.

Al-Sharaa's first year in office saw massacres targeting Alawites in coastal Syria and clashes with the Druze in southern Syria, both involving troops linked to the government. In 2025, Time magazine listed him as one of the world's 100 most influential people. In the same year, The Economist awarded its country of the year title to Syria, under al-Sharaa's presidency, noting that he had generated a "series of positive surprises".

Since his appointment as president of Syria following the fall of the Assad regime, al-Sharaa has been described as a strongman. According to ORF Middle East, al-Sharaa inherited a state lacking capital, functioning institutions, a monopoly on force, and international legitimacy, but benefited from Western and regional support for a stable Syria less aligned with Iran and Russia. He has sought to use this support to strengthen his government amid its limited domestic capacity.

== Background ==
In late November 2024, Ahmed al-Sharaa led Hay'at Tahrir al-Sham (HTS) in the 2024 Syrian opposition offensives against the Ba'athist Syrian government's armed forces. On 6 December, in a face-to-face interview with CNN, al-Sharaa declared that the offensive's goal was to remove Assad from power. He outlined plans for establishing a government grounded in institutions and a "council chosen by the people". He also expressed his intention to facilitate the return of Syrian refugees to their homes and explicitly pledged to protect minority groups.

=== Fall of the Assad regime ===
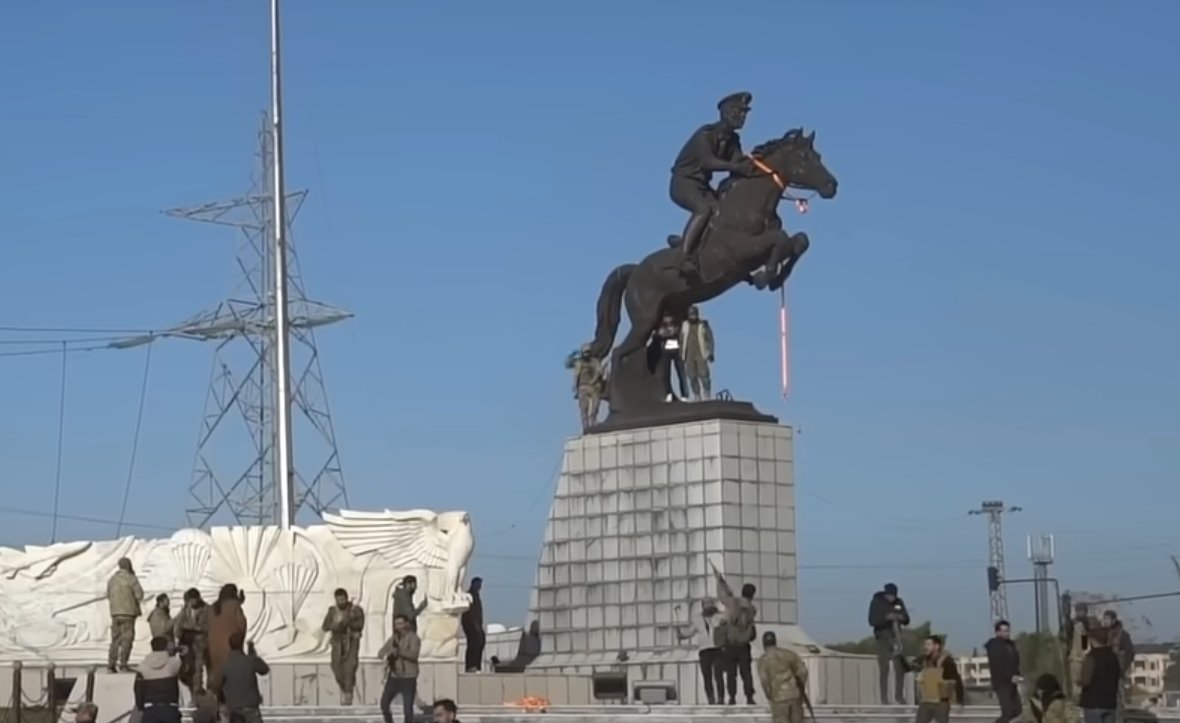
Syrian opposition fighters toppling a statue of Bassel al-Assad in New Aleppo

On 8 December 2024, Damascus fell to opposition forces, resulting in the collapse of the Assad regime, which had governed Syria as a hereditary sectarian totalitarian regime since 1971 following a coup d'état.

HTS leader Ahmed al-Sharaa then became the de facto leader of Syria, serving as General Commander and head of the new Syrian Administration. The same day, al-Sharaa delivered a speech at Damascus's Umayyad Mosque, calling Assad's overthrow "a new chapter in the history of the region" and condemning Syria's role as "a playground for Iranian ambitions", characterized by sectarianism and corruption. After the fall of the Assad regime, Mohammad Ghazi al-Jalali, Bashar al-Assad's ninth prime minister, remained in office in a caretaker capacity until a caretaker government led by Mohammed al-Bashir was formed, and the position of prime minister was subsequently abolished on 29 March 2025 when the Syrian transitional government replaced the caretaker administration.

=== Post-Assad governance ===
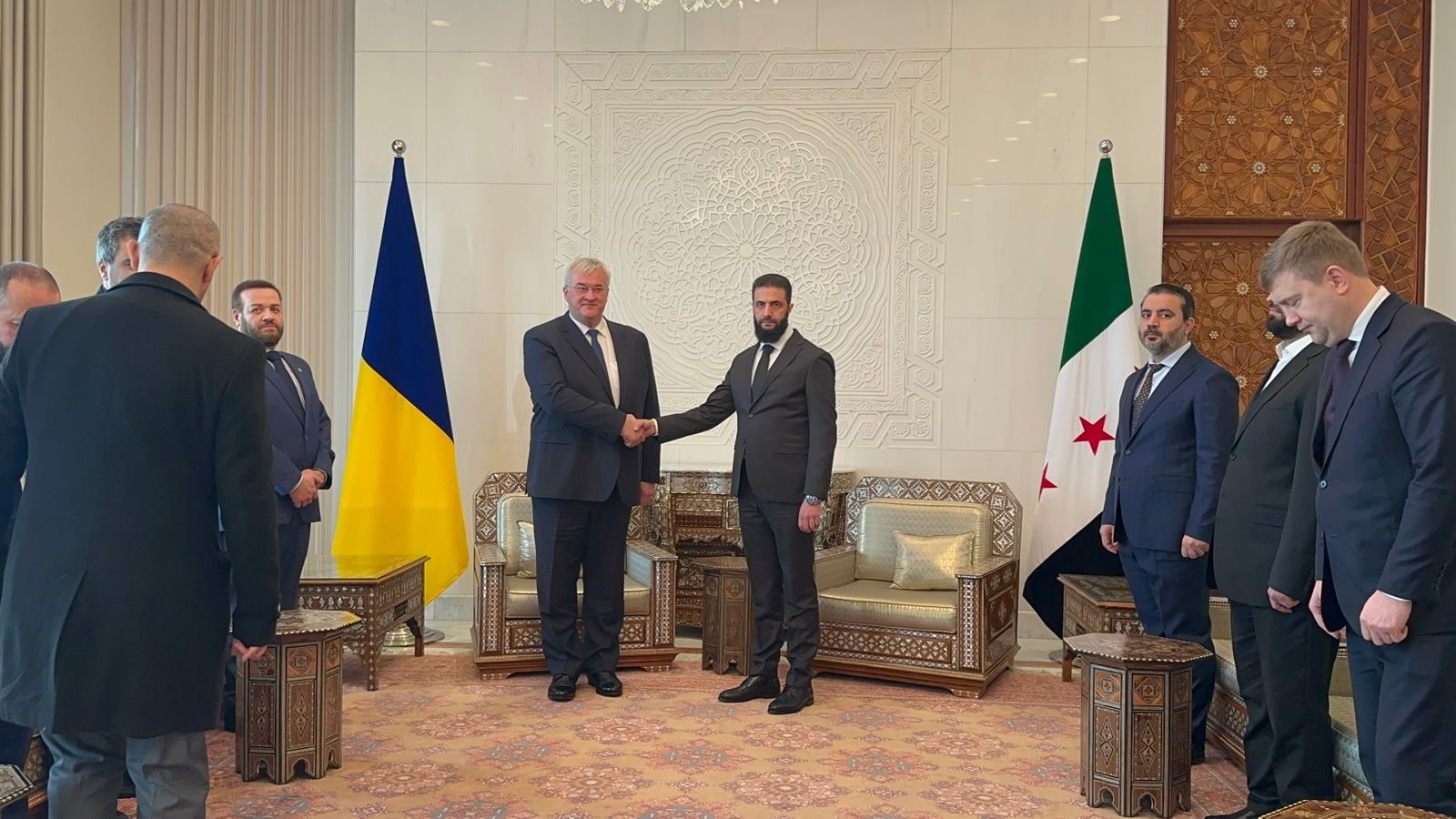
Al-Sharaa with Ukrainian foreign minister Andrii Sybiha, 30 December 2024

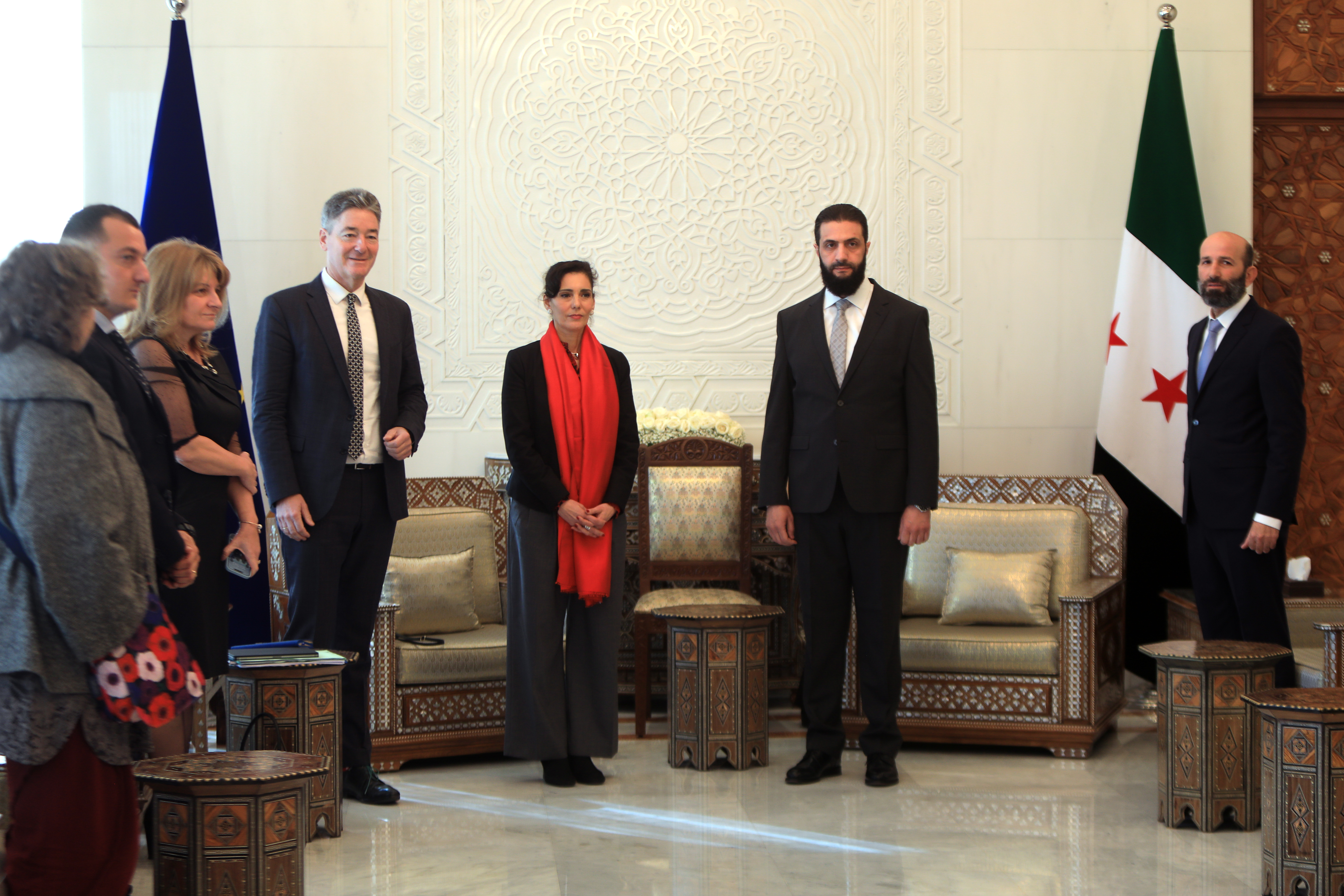
Syria's de facto leader, Ahmed al-Sharaa, met with European Commissioner Hadja Lahbib in Syria on 17 January 2025

Only a few days afterwards, al-Sharaa met with Turkish officials, marking the first diplomatic delegation to Syria since the fall of the Assad regime. The United States rescinded a seven-year-old $10 million bounty on information leading to al-Sharaa's capture after he met with a U.S. delegation—the first formal U.S. diplomatic presence in Syria in over 10 years—with a U.S. envoy stating that the action was a political decision to initiate dialogue with HTS, noting that during the Damascus discussions al-Sharaa committed not to allow ISIS or other terrorist groups to operate within Syria.

On 24 December, al-Sharaa announced the dissolution and merger of multiple rebel factions, including the Turkish-backed Syrian National Army, into the Ministry of Defense, while excluding the Kurdish-led Syrian Democratic Forces due to conflicts with Turkish-backed rebels in northeastern Syria. This reorganization coincided with his efforts to establish new state institutions, including law enforcement and security forces, amid reports of revenge killings and highway banditry, and included the creation of processing centers for former regime soldiers and the initiation of police force recruitment.

In an interview with al-Arabiya on 29 December, al-Sharaa said that he expected the process of writing a new permanent constitution of Syria to take two or three years, with elections expected after four years. Later that day, al-Sharaa announced the promotion of 42 individuals to the rank of Colonel, five to the rank of Brigadier General, and two to the rank of Major General in the Syrian Army to the Minister of Defence, Murhaf Abu Qasra, and Chief of the General Staff of the Syrian Armed Forces, Ali Noureddine al-Naasan, who were both elevated to the rank of Major General. On 30 December, Ukraine's top diplomat met with al-Sharaa in Damascus.

On 3 January 2025, German Foreign Minister Annalena Baerbock and French Foreign Minister Jean-Noël Barrot became the first top diplomats from European Union member states to visit Damascus since the fall of Assad, meeting with al-Sharaa to discuss a new political beginning between Europe and Syria, and on 29 January, a Russian delegation led by Deputy Foreign Minister Mikhail Bogdanov also visited Damascus to meet al-Sharaa, reaffirming Moscow's support for Syria's sovereignty and territorial integrity following the regime's collapse.

== Appointment ==
Ahmed al-Sharaa, appointed President of Syria, addressing the conference, January 2025

On 29 January 2025, during the Syrian Revolution Victory Conference held at the People's Palace, Hassan Abdul Ghani, spokesman for the HTS-led Military Operations Command, stated that al-Sharaa had been appointed as the president of Syria and would govern the country during the transitional period, assume the duties of the president, and represent the nation on the international stage.

After his appointment as president, al-Sharaa delivered a brief speech outlining the government's immediate priorities, which included filling the power vacuum, maintaining civil peace, building state institutions, developing the economy, and restoring Syria's international and regional standing. In his first address as president on 31 January, he stated:

In January 2025, opposition groups announced their disbandment during the Victory Conference, with areas in green being under their control at this moment

From here, I address you today in my capacity as president of Syria in this fateful period, asking God to grant us all success so we can revive our homeland, and overcome the challenges that we are facing, and that will only be through all standing together in people and leadership. I address you today not as a ruler but as a servant for our wounded homeland, striving with all power and will I have been given to realise Syria's unity and renaissance, as we should all understand that this is a transitional stage, and it is part of a political process that requires true participation by all Syrian men and women, inside and outside the country, so that we can build their future with freedom and dignity, without marginalisation or sidelining.

Al-Sharaa received congratulations from the leaders of several countries, including Afghanistan, Azerbaijan, Canada, Mauritania, Morocco, Russia, Saudi Arabia, and the United Arab Emirates. On 1 February 2025, Jasem Mohamed al-Budaiwi, Secretary-General of the Gulf Cooperation Council (GCC), congratulated al-Sharaa on assuming Syria's presidency, expressed confidence in his leadership, and reaffirmed the GCC's support during the transitional period, while on 17 February, Mazloum Abdi, commander-in-chief of the Syrian Democratic Forces, also congratulated him on assuming the presidency and invited him to visit northeastern Syria.

=== First 100 days ===
Asharq Al-Awsat reported that the first 100 days of al-Sharaa's presidency received mixed reactions. Syria remained politically and regionally divided and continued to face foreign influence and various forms of external occupation. The country also confronted serious economic challenges. Despite the government's controversial background, the transitional administration managed to ease some international concerns and restore communication with key regional and global partners. On 12 March 2025, the Syrian caretaker government announced the formation of a National Security Council to be chaired by al-Sharaa.

== Administration ==
=== Cabinet ===
Presidential Decree No. 9 of 2025, forming the transitional government

On 29 March 2025, al-Sharaa announced the formation of Syria's transitional government during a ceremony at the People's Palace in Damascus, where the newly appointed ministers took their oaths and presented their plans, replacing the Syrian caretaker government. The transitional government included four ministers from minority groups—Yaarub Bader, an Alawite; Amjad Badr, a Druze; Hind Kabawat, a Christian; and Mohammad Abdul Rahman Tarkou, a Kurd—as well as figures from different former opposition groups, such as Mohammed Abu al-Khair Shukri, former member of the Syrian National Coalition and the new Minister of Endowments, and Raed al-Saleh, former Director of the White Helmets and the new Minister of Disaster Management and Emergency Response, and was described by some observers as technocratic, with ministers chosen according to their competences, according to al-Sharaa.

Al-Sharaa stated that the new government will reform the energy sector for sustainability and reliable electricity, support farmers to ensure food production, revive the industry, protect national products, attract investment, stabilize the economy, strengthen the Syrian pound, and prevent financial manipulation. He also retained Asaad al-Shaibani as Minister of Foreign Affairs and Expatriates and Murhaf Abu Qasra as Minister of Defense.

On 9 May, as part of a partial government reshuffle, al-Sharaa appointed Khaled Fawaz Zaarour and Basel al-Suweydan as the Ministers of Information and Agriculture, replacing Hamza al-Mustafa and Amjad Badr, respectively. The reshuffle was the first since the ouster of former president Bashar al-Assad.

Portfolio	Minister	Took office	Left office	Party	Ref
Minister of Interior	Anas Khattab	29 March 2025	Incumbent	Independent	
Minister of Defence	Murhaf Abu Qasra	29 March 2025	Incumbent	Independent	
Minister of Foreign Affairs and Expatriates	Asaad al-Shaibani	29 March 2025	Incumbent	Independent	
Minister of Justice	Mazhar al-Wais	29 March 2025	Incumbent	Independent	
Minister of Endowments	Mohammed Abu al-Khair Shukri	29 March 2025	Incumbent	Independent	
Minister of Higher Education and Scientific Research	Marwan al-Halabi	29 March 2025	Incumbent	Independent	
Minister of Social Affairs and Labor	Hind Kabawat	29 March 2025	Incumbent	Independent	
Minister of Energy	Mohammed al-Bashir	29 March 2025	Incumbent	Independent	
Minister of Finance	Mohammed Yisr Barnieh	29 March 2025	Incumbent	Independent	
Minister of Economy and Industry	Mohammad Nidal al-Shaar	29 March 2025	Incumbent	Independent	
Minister of Health	Musaab Nazzal al-Ali	29 March 2025	Incumbent	Independent	
Minister of Local Administration and Environment	Mohammed Anjrani	29 March 2025	Incumbent	Independent	
Minister of Emergency and Disaster Management	Raed al-Saleh	29 March 2025	Incumbent	Independent	
Minister of Communications and Information Technology	Abdul Salam Haykal	29 March 2025	Incumbent	Independent	
Minister of Agriculture	Amjad Badr	29 March 2025	9 May 2026	Independent	
Minister of Agriculture	Basel al-Suweydan	9 May 2026	Incumbent	Independent	
Minister of Education	Mohammad Abdul Rahman Tarkou	29 March 2025	Incumbent	Independent	
Minister of Public Works and Housing	Mustafa Abdul Razzaq	29 March 2025	Incumbent	Independent	
Minister of Culture	Mohammed Yassin Saleh	29 March 2025	Incumbent	Independent	
Minister of Sports and Youth	Mohammad Sameh Hamedh	29 March 2025	Incumbent	Independent	
Minister of Tourism	Mazen al-Salhani	29 March 2025	Incumbent	Independent	
Minister of Administrative Development	Mohammad Skaf	29 March 2025	Incumbent	Independent	
Minister of Transportation	Yaarub Bader	29 March 2025	Incumbent	Independent	
Minister of Information	Hamza al-Mustafa	29 March 2025	9 May 2026	Independent	
Minister of Information	Khaled Fawaz Zaarour	9 May 2026	Incumbent	Independent	

=== Advisors ===
On 5 April 2025, the Syrian president appointed Maher al-Sharaa as Secretary-General to the Presidency, succeeding Abdul Rahman Salama. The position of Secretary-General was reportedly regarded as a high-ranking post within the Syrian state. According to reports, the appointment was seen as nepotistic. On 9 May 2026, he was replaced by former Homs Governor Abdul Rahman al-Aama as Secretary-General. Al-Aama was appointed through a presidential decree issued by Ahmed al-Sharaa. It is reported that Ahmad Muaffaq Zaidan is the media advisor to President al-Sharaa. Ali Keda was appointed as the Assistant Secretary-General of the Presidency on 26 May 2025. On 27 August 2026, al-Sharaa appointed Mazloum Abdi, the former commander-in-chief of the Syrian Democratic Forces, as an Adviser to the Presidency of the Republic.

Portfolio	Name	Took office	Left office
Secretary-General to the Presidency	Abdul Rahman al-Aama	9 May 2026	Incumbent
Assistant Secretary-General to the Presidency for the Cabinet Affairs	Ali Keda	26 May 2025	Incumbent
Adviser to the Presidency for the Media Affairs	Ahmad Muaffaq Zaidan	22 August 2025	Incumbent
Adviser to the Presidency of the Republic	Mazloum Abdi	27 August 2026	Incumbent

== Domestic policy ==
=== Early actions ===
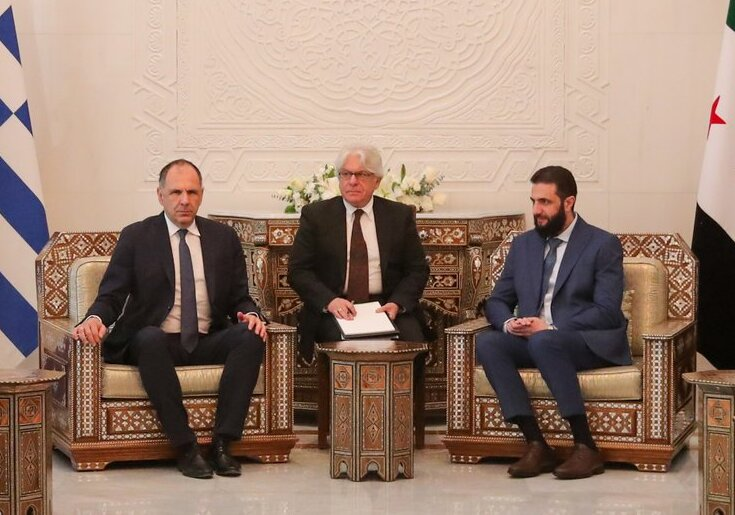
Syrian President Ahmed al-Sharaa with Greek Foreign Minister Giorgos Gerapetritis in Syria on 9 February 2025

A day after al-Sharaa's appointment as president, Qatari Emir Tamim bin Hamad Al Thani became the first head of state to visit Damascus since the collapse of the Assad regime to discuss post-conflict reconstruction and other topics, and on 12 February 2025, al-Sharaa held his first contact with Russian President Vladimir Putin since Assad's overthrow via a phone call, while also meeting representatives of the Syrian National Coalition and the Syrian Negotiation Commission, including their presidents Hadi al-Bahra and Bader Jamous, with both organizations announced to dissolve under the new authorities.

In mid-February, al-Sharaa made his first official trip to the coastal provinces of Latakia and Tartus, former strongholds of the ousted president Bashar al-Assad, and on 21 February, he met with China's ambassador to Damascus, Shi Hongwei, marking the first official interaction between the two nations since Assad's overthrow, while in early June, he visited Daraa Governorate for the first time since the Assad regime was toppled, coinciding with Eid al-Adha, in the city widely known as the "cradle of the revolution" for being the site of the first protests against Assad's rule.

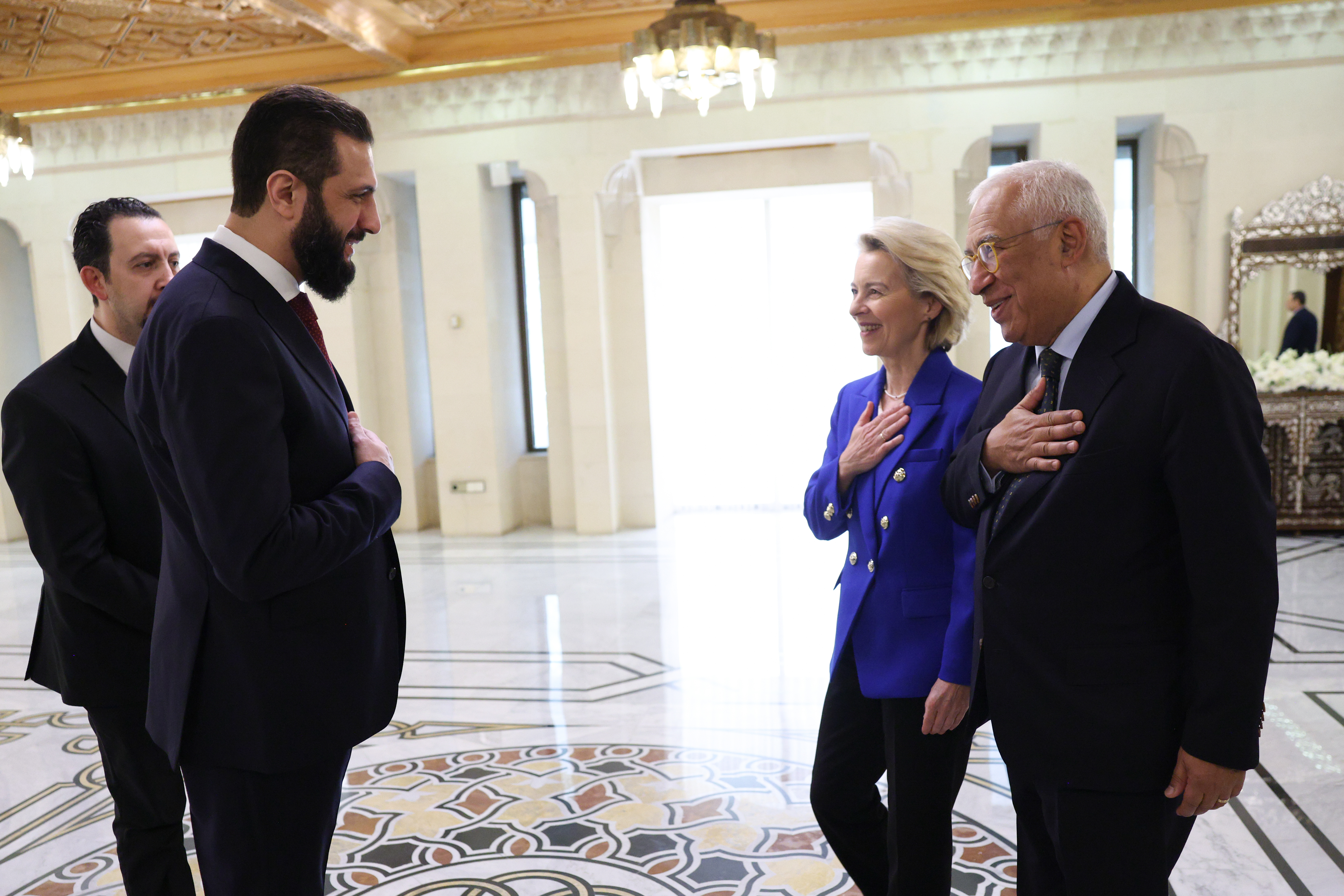
Al-Sharaa with European Commission President Ursula von der Leyen and European Council President António Costa, 9 January 2026

On 17 May 2025, al-Sharaa signed a decree appointing Abdulbaset Abdullatif and Mohammad Reda Jalkhi as heads of the commission, granting them 30 days to form a working team and draft the internal regulations for its operation, which led to the establishment of the National Commissions for the Missing and Transitional Justice; he later established the Supreme Council for Economic Development through another decree issued on 9 July 2025 as part of a series of economic reforms introduced after Assad's overthrow in late 2024, aimed at stabilizing and revitalizing the Syrian economy. On 27 August 2025, al-Sharaa inaugurated the 62nd Damascus International Fair, the first to be held since the fall of the Assad regime.

On 19 October 2025, al-Sharaa met with the Minister of Culture, Mohammed Yassin Saleh, alongside a group of "several writers and poets", during which, "arrangements related to the Syrian national anthem were addressed." In October 2025, al-Sharaa issued a presidential decree defining Syria's official holidays, removing 8 March Revolution Day, Teachers' Day, Tishreen Liberation War Day and Martyrs' Day from the list. The decree introduces two new official holidays: the Syrian Revolution Day on 18 March and Liberation Day on 8 December, which commemorates the fall of the Assad regime. In October 2025, a parliamentary election was held under al-Sharaa's administration, the first since the fall of the Ba'athist regime.

On 29 December 2025, al-Sharaa officially launched the new national currency in Damascus, attended by his wife Latifa al-Droubi and the Governor of the Central Bank of Syria, Abdulkader Husrieh, who unveiled the new banknotes, and on 18 February 2026, he signed his first amnesty decree since leading the rebel advance that overthrew Bashar al-Assad, granting pardon to certain offenders while excluding those accused of "serious violations" against the Syrian people.

The People’s Assembly’s first session was originally scheduled for 6 July 2026 but was delayed until 12 July, when it was held as the first legislative session to convene since the fall of the Assad regime. On 7 July 2026, al-Sharaa issued a decree appointing Issam al-Khalif as president of the Supreme Constitutional Court, along with six other members. On 19 July, the court held its inaugural meeting to begin drafting legislation governing its functions and defining its jurisdiction.

=== Syrian Constitutional Declaration ===
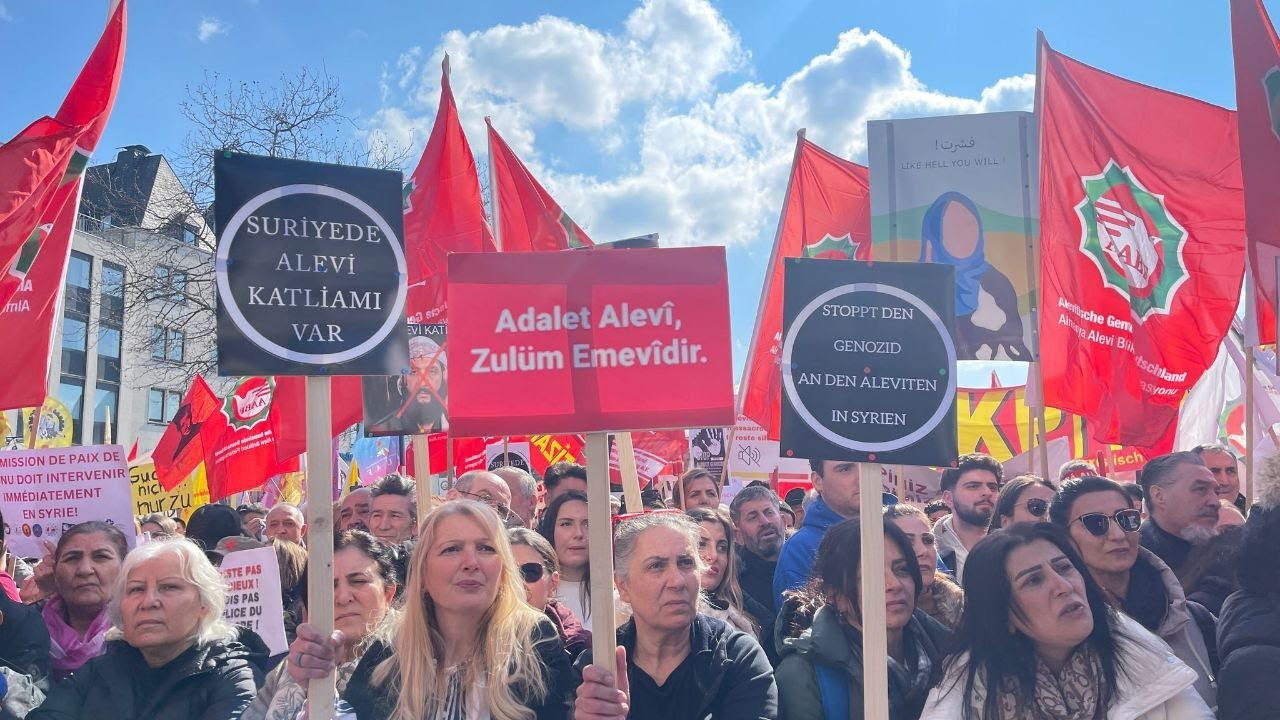
Protest in Cologne, Germany, against the Alawite massacres in Syria, March 2025

Following the repeal of the 2012 Ba'athist constitution during the Syrian Revolution Victory Conference on 29 January 2025, al-Sharaa stated in his first address on 31 January as president that he would hold a "National Dialogue Conference" and issue a "constitutional declaration" to serve as the legal reference in place of the suspended Assad-era constitution. On 2 March 2025, he established a committee to draft a temporary constitutional declaration to guide the country's transition, and on 13 March, he signed the declaration, which set a five-year transitional period, created a presidential system with executive power vested in the president who appoints ministers and eliminated the position of prime minister, enshrined Islamic law as the main source of jurisprudence while preserving freedoms of opinion and expression, and established the People's Assembly to act as Syria's parliament during the transition and oversee the drafting of a new permanent constitution.

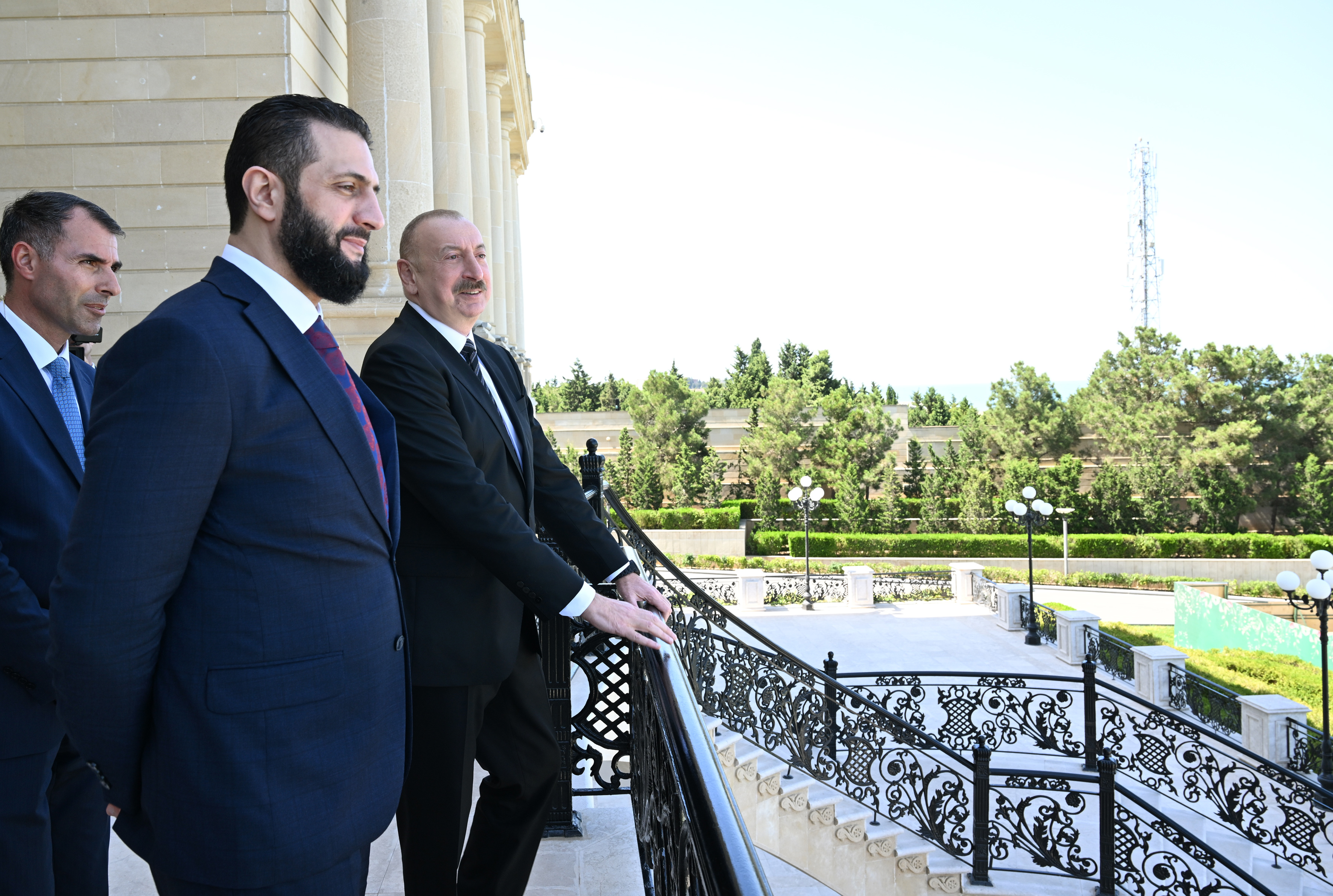
Al-Sharaa with Azerbaijani president Ilham Aliyev, 12 July 2025

=== Western Syria clashes ===
By 6 March 2025, clashes broke out in Western Syria between Assad loyalists and government forces. It was the worst violence to have occurred since rebels toppled the Assad regime. Condemning attacks against police forces, hospitals, and civilians by Assadist insurgents, al-Sharaa stated, "You attacked all Syrians and made an unforgivable mistake. The riposte has come, and you have not been able to withstand it," demanding that they surrender their weapons "before it's too late" and affirming that he would "continue to work towards monopolizing weapons in the hands of the state, and there will be no more unregulated weapons."

Al-Sharaa urged pro-government fighters to "avoid any abuses" following reports of massacres of Alawite civilians in Latakia, and on 9 March, he announced the formation of an independent national committee of seven judges to investigate the events and violations in the Syrian coastal areas, emphasizing that the committee must submit its findings to the president within 30 days and describing the coastal violence as part of the "expected challenges." On 10 March, al-Sharaa condemned the mass killings of Alawites, emphasizing that such violence threatens national unity, pledging to hold all perpetrators accountable—including those within his own ranks—attributing the initial violence to pro-Assad groups backed by foreign entities while acknowledging subsequent revenge attacks, and reiterating his commitment to uphold the rule of law and prevent the nation from descending into sectarian conflict. As of 12 March 2025, the UK-based war monitor Syrian Observatory for Human Rights (SOHR) reported that 1,614 civilians were killed by armed groups and security forces supporting the Syrian government between 6 March 2025 and 12 March 2025. An investigation by Reuters published on 30 June 2025 concluded that 1,479 Alawites were killed across 40 different sites in a pattern of ethnically-targeted killing.

=== Syrian Democratic Forces peace deal ===
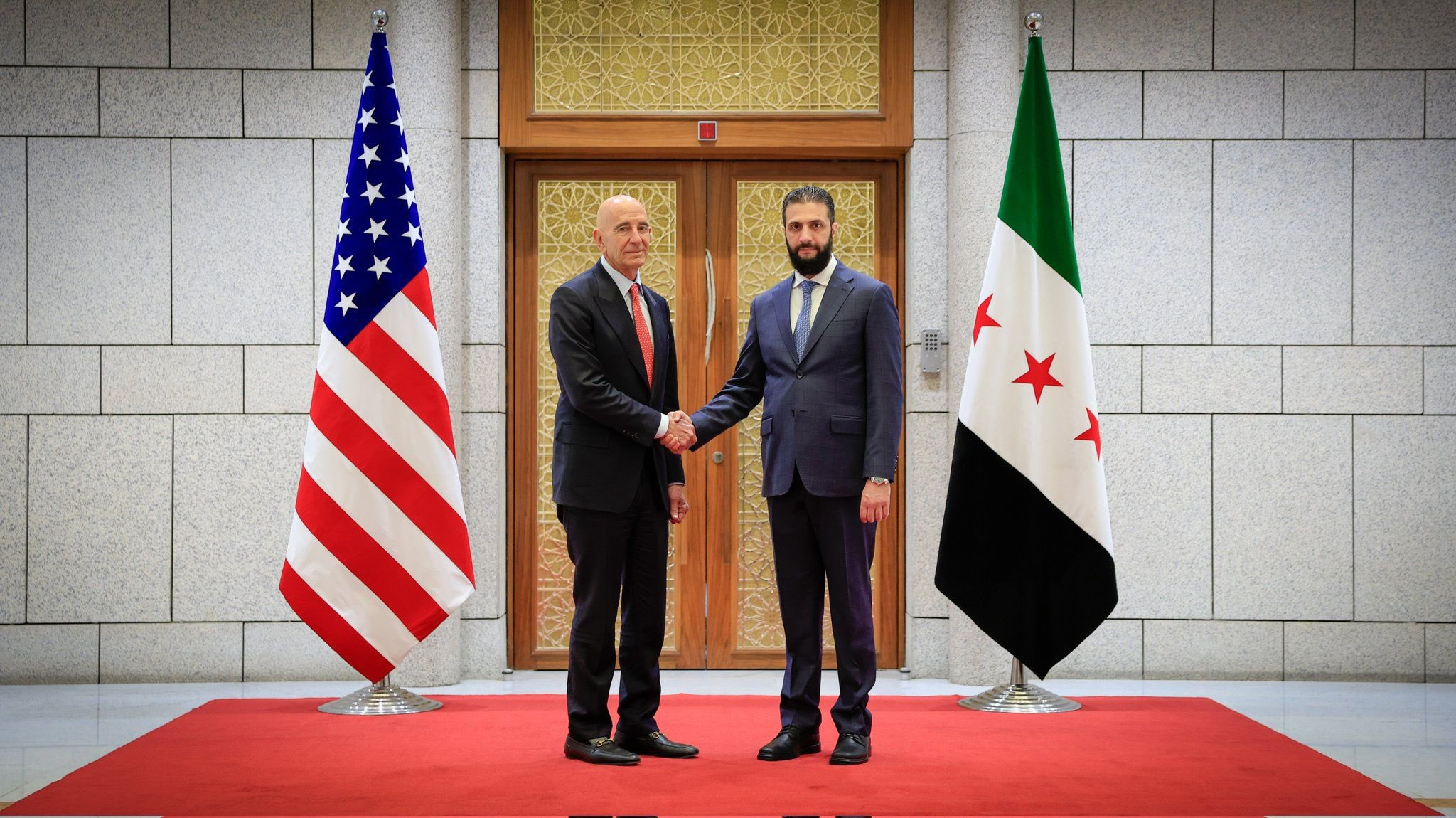
United States Special Envoy Tom Barrack with al-Sharaa in Damascus, May 2025. The U.S. mediated the 10 March agreement between the Syrian Democratic Forces (SDF) and the Syrian government

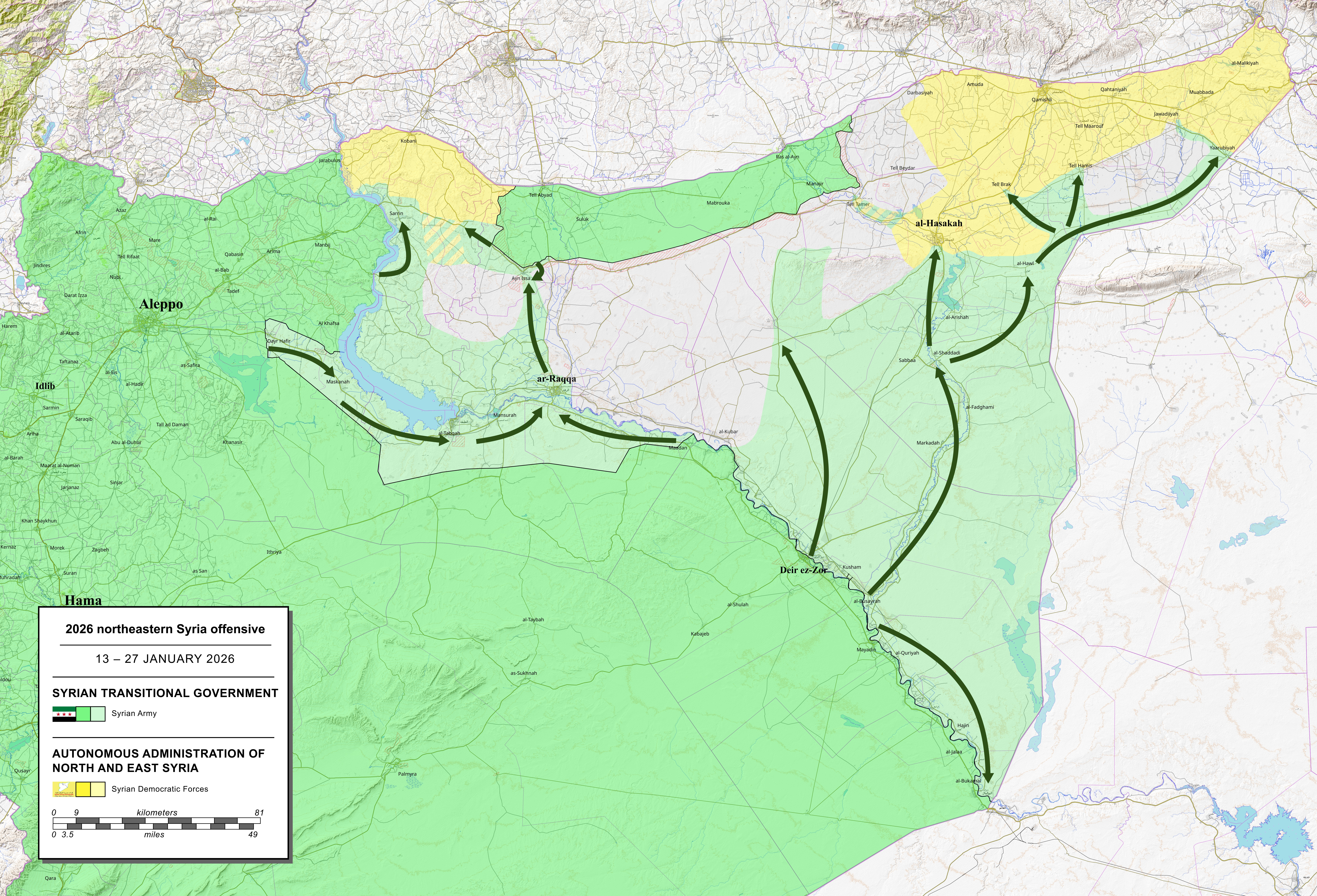
Military situation after the government offensives against the SDF in January 2026

On 10 March 2025, al-Sharaa signed an agreement with Mazloum Abdi, commander-in-chief of the Syrian Democratic Forces (SDF), to integrate the SDF into state institutions and bring northeastern Syria under central government control, including the merging of military forces and the transfer of border crossings, airports, and oil fields to state control, while recognizing the Kurdish community as an essential part of Syria with constitutional rights and citizenship protections. However, negotiations on integration remained inconclusive throughout the summer of 2025, with the merger deadline set for the end of the year.

During the 6–10 January military operation in Aleppo, the Syrian Army took control of the city's Kurdish districts, and in an interview with Shams TV, al-Sharaa described the operation in Sheikh Maqsood as aimed at ensuring security, stability, and safeguarding the country's economic interests, calling it successful while highlighting that it was carried out with minimal costs and allowed for the safe evacuation of civilians.

The 13–27 January government offensive saw Arab tribes defecting to al-Sharaa's support, the continuous retreat of the SDF, and the de facto collapse of Rojava, and as part of efforts toward reconciliation with the Kurdish population, on 16 January 2026 al-Sharaa issued a decree recognizing Syrian Kurds as an essential part of the Syrian people and the country's diverse national identity, declaring Kurdish a national language and Newroz a national holiday, while his government announced ceasefires with the SDF on 20 and 31 January 2026, including plans to integrate the SDF into the government.

==== Integration into the Syrian State and Dissolution of the Syrian Democratic Forces ====
On 20 August, during the centenary celebrations of the city of Qamishli, SDF Commander-in-Chief Mazloum Abdi declared that the integration of the military, security, and administrative institutions into the Syrian state had been completed and that non-Syrian fighters affiliated with the SDF had withdrawn. On 25 August, Abdi, alongside YPJ commander Newroz Ahmed and co-president of the DAANES Executive Council, Îlham Ehmed, travelled to Damascus for a day of discussions, following which Abdi gave a press conference in which he declared the integration of the SDF into the Syrian state and its formal dissolution.

Numerous SDF units were not included in the deal and sidelined, as the Syrian Army refused to integrate the Women's Protection Units (YPJ) or any pro-SDF Arab units. Syrian Defense Minister Murhaf Abu Qasra claimed that allowing women to serve in the army was "against Islam" despite the anti-discrimination articles of the Constitutional Declaration and the fact that all neighboring Muslim states allowed women in their militaries. The YPJ subsequently held talks with the Syrian Ministry of Interior which then began to include armed women in its security forces. On 20 October, the Kobani Brigade, formed of SDF fighters, completed its military training programme in Al-Nabk, Rif Dimashq, as part of the process to integrate military formations into the transitional government’s Defence Ministry. The end of military rehabilitation programs does not necessarily mean that all the operational details related to integration, including the organization of command and the distribution of tasks within the new military structure, have been resolved.

=== Southern Syria clashes ===
Military situation following the dissolution of the SDF and the integration of the DAANES, with Druze factions of the Administrative Council of Jabal Bashan controlling areas in southern Syria (pink) and Israeli forces controlling the demilitarized buffer zone in southwestern Syria, adjacent to the Israeli-occupied Golan Heights, in August 2026.

Following the fall of the Assad regime, Israeli forces launched military operations into Quneitra Governorate in southwestern Syria, advancing armored units into the buffer zone between the Israeli-occupied Golan Heights and the rest of Syria and targeting areas such as Tel Ayouba in the central Quneitra countryside with artillery fire, marking the first time in 50 years that Israeli forces crossed the Purple Line since the ceasefire agreements of 31 May 1974 following the Yom Kippur War.

In July 2025, armed clashes broke out between the Druze and Bedouins in Suwayda, prompting the Syrian Army to intervene, while the Israeli Air Force struck Syrian tanks in the area as a "warning" to Syria's transitional government. On 16 July, the Israeli Defense Forces bombed the Syrian military headquarters in Damascus, citing security concerns over the Army's deployment to Suwayda, with strikes later targeting the vicinity of the People's Palace and multiple locations across Suwayda and Daraa Governorates, including al-Tha'lah Military Airbase. That evening, the Syrian Army began withdrawing from Suwayda after completing operations against "outlaw groups," a move reported by state news agency SANA as being in line with a deal reached between the Syrian transitional government and Druze religious leaders.

Shortly after the ceasefire took effect, al-Sharaa addressed Syria, criticizing Israel for its attacks on government forces and civilian facilities, and expressing gratitude to American, Turkish, and Arab mediators for helping de-escalate the conflict.

=== Crackdowns on corruption ===
On 20 August 2025, Reuters reported that al-Sharaa rebuked more than 100 loyalists over corruption and for arriving in luxury vehicles, and on 6 October 2025, he shut down a business office owned by his brother, Jamal al-Sharaa, as part of an anti-corruption crackdown. His brother, Jamal, denied reports that the Syrian president reprimanded officials over displays of wealth during a meeting in Idlib province, describing the claims as fabrications intended to distort the truth, while Ahmad Mohammad Deeb Tu'meh, Director of Political Affairs in Rural Damascus, also said the report contained false information, adding, "The president did not address any issue related to luxury cars abroad. I attended the entire meeting and did not hear any such remarks."

== Foreign affairs ==
International trips made by al-Sharaa as president

After taking office as president, al-Sharaa made a trip abroad, visiting Azerbaijan, Bahrain, Jordan, Kuwait, Saudi Arabia, Egypt, France, Qatar, Turkey, the United States, and the United Arab Emirates. He attended the emergency summit of the Arab League, the fourth Antalya Diplomacy Forum, and the 2025 Arab–Islamic extraordinary summit.

On 18 April 2025, Palestinian President Mahmoud Abbas met with al-Sharaa in Damascus, his first visit to Syria since 2007. They discussed strengthening bilateral ties and regional developments, including Gaza and the two-state solution, and agreed to form joint committees for cooperation. However, on 22 April 2025, after demands from the United States, al-Sharaa ordered the arrest of two leaders of the Palestinian Islamic Jihad in Syria and stated that Syria would seek the dismantlement of all armed Palestinian groups in Syria.

On 4 December, al-Sharaa met with the UN Security Council delegation and several UN officials at the People's Palace in Damascus, joined by a number of Syrian ministers, marking the delegation's first-ever visit to Syria since the Council was established in 1945. On 9 January 2026, during a visit to Damascus, European Commission President Ursula von der Leyen met with al-Sharaa and announced a substantial financial assistance package of approximately €620 million to be disbursed in 2026 and 2027, marking a significant shift in EU–Syria relations following the fall of the Assad regime in late 2024, and during her stay, she described the clashes in Aleppo between the Syrian government and the Kurdish-led SDF as "worrying."

=== International trips ===
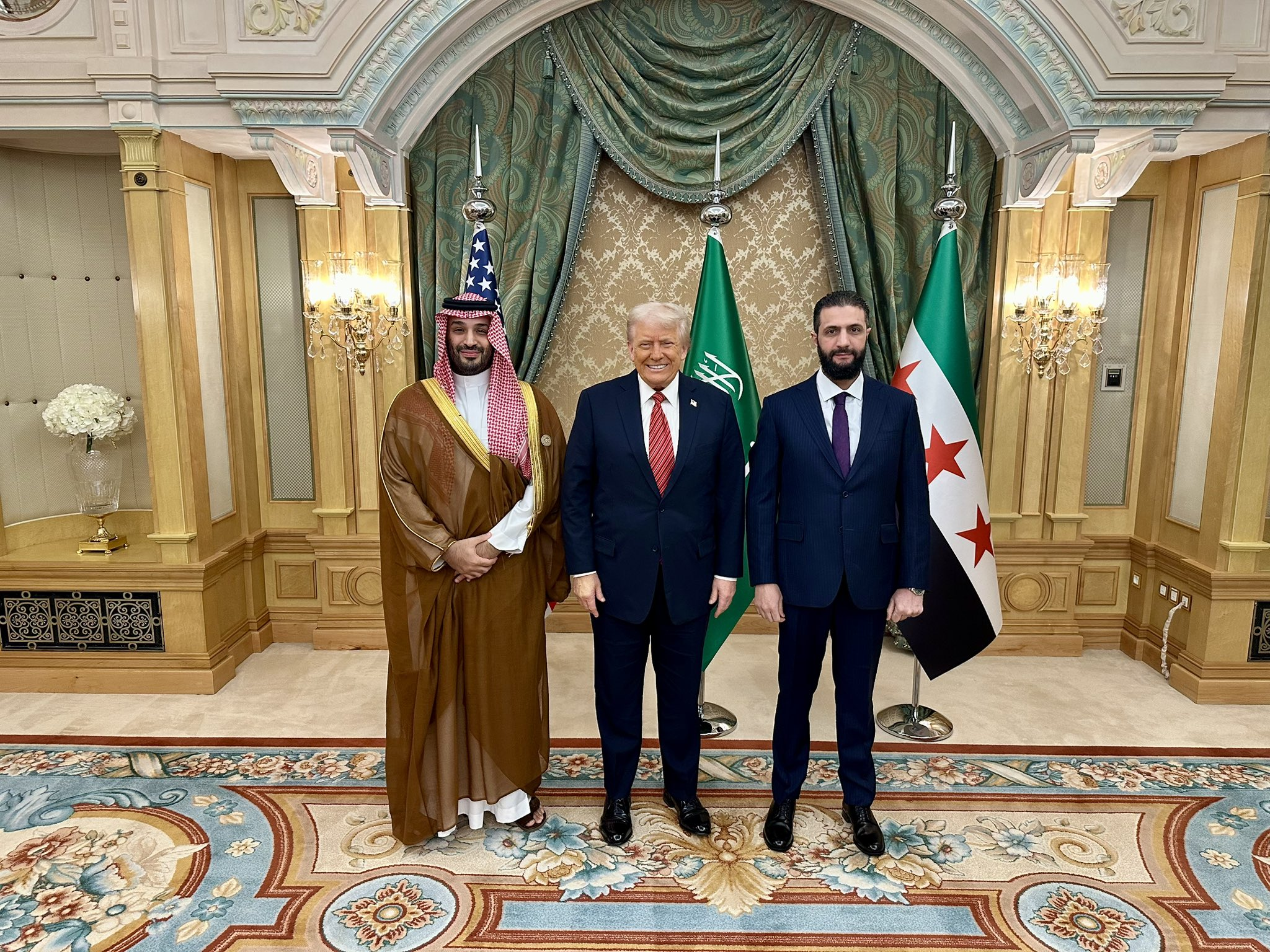
Al-Sharaa with U.S. President Donald Trump and Saudi Crown Prince Mohammed bin Salman, 14 May 2025

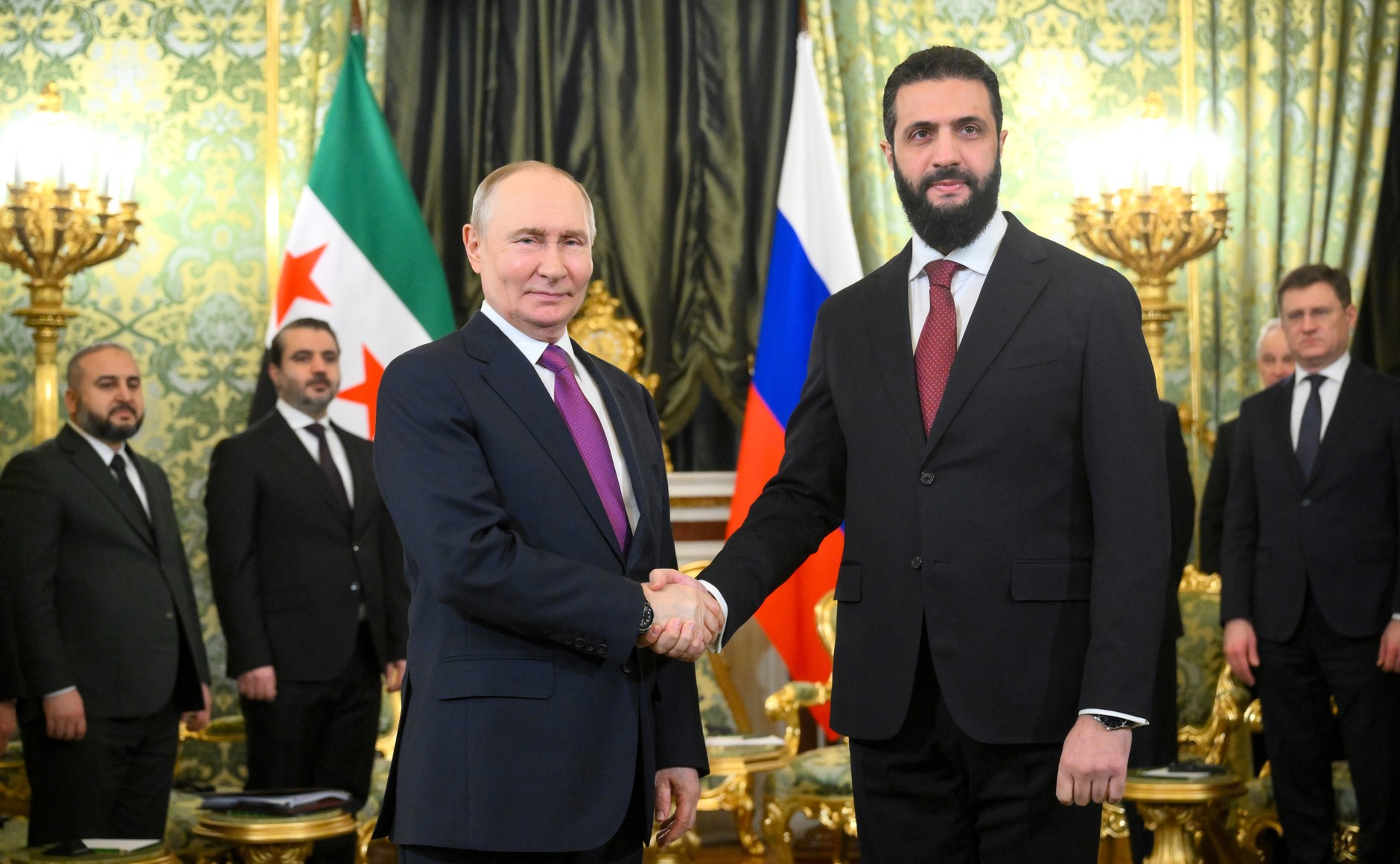
Al-Sharaa with Russian president Vladimir Putin, 28 January 2026

On 2 February 2025, al-Sharaa and Foreign Minister Asaad al-Shaibani visited Saudi Arabia and met with Saudi Crown Prince Mohammed bin Salman, marking al-Sharaa's first foreign visit since the fall of the Assad regime.

On 7 May 2025, he met with French President Emmanuel Macron in Paris on his first official visit to Europe since becoming president of Syria, and on 14 May, he met with U.S. President Donald Trump in Saudi Arabia—the first meeting between American and Syrian presidents since Bill Clinton and Hafez al-Assad met in Geneva in 2000—during which Trump urged him to join the Abraham Accords.

On 24 September, he addressed the general debate of the 80th session of the United Nations General Assembly, becoming the first Syrian leader to do so since Nureddin al-Atassi in 1967. (Note: Nureddin al-Atassi spoke after the Six-Day War, not during the general debate. Neither Hafez al-Assad nor Bashar al-Assad spoke at the UNGA during their presidencies.) He also met with Ukrainian president Volodymyr Zelenskyy, after which the latter announced the restoration of diplomatic relations between their countries that had been severed following the Assad regime's decision to recognize the independence of the Donetsk and Luhansk People's Republics in June 2022.

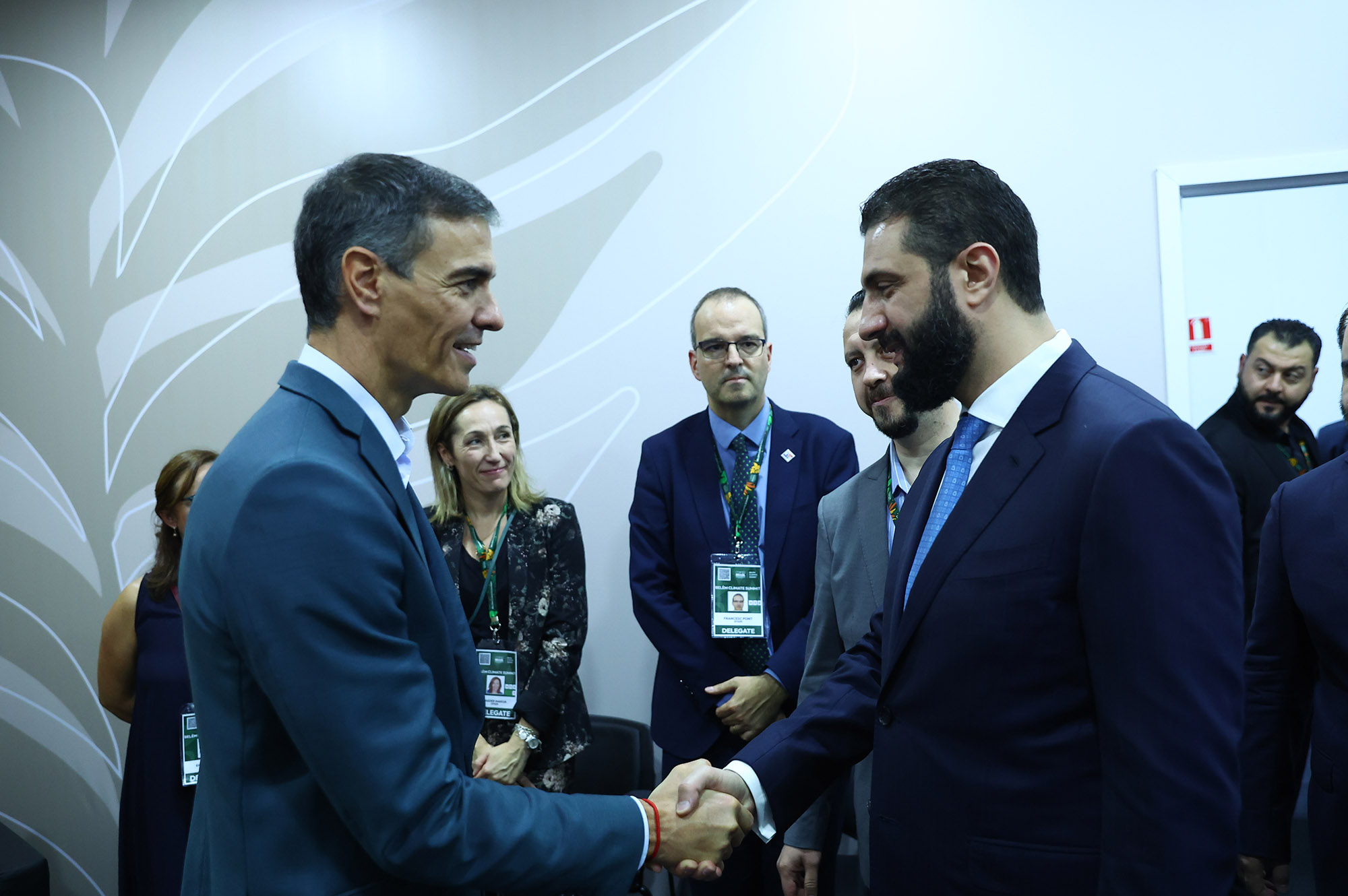
Al-Sharaa and Spanish Prime Minister Pedro Sánchez, 7 November 2025

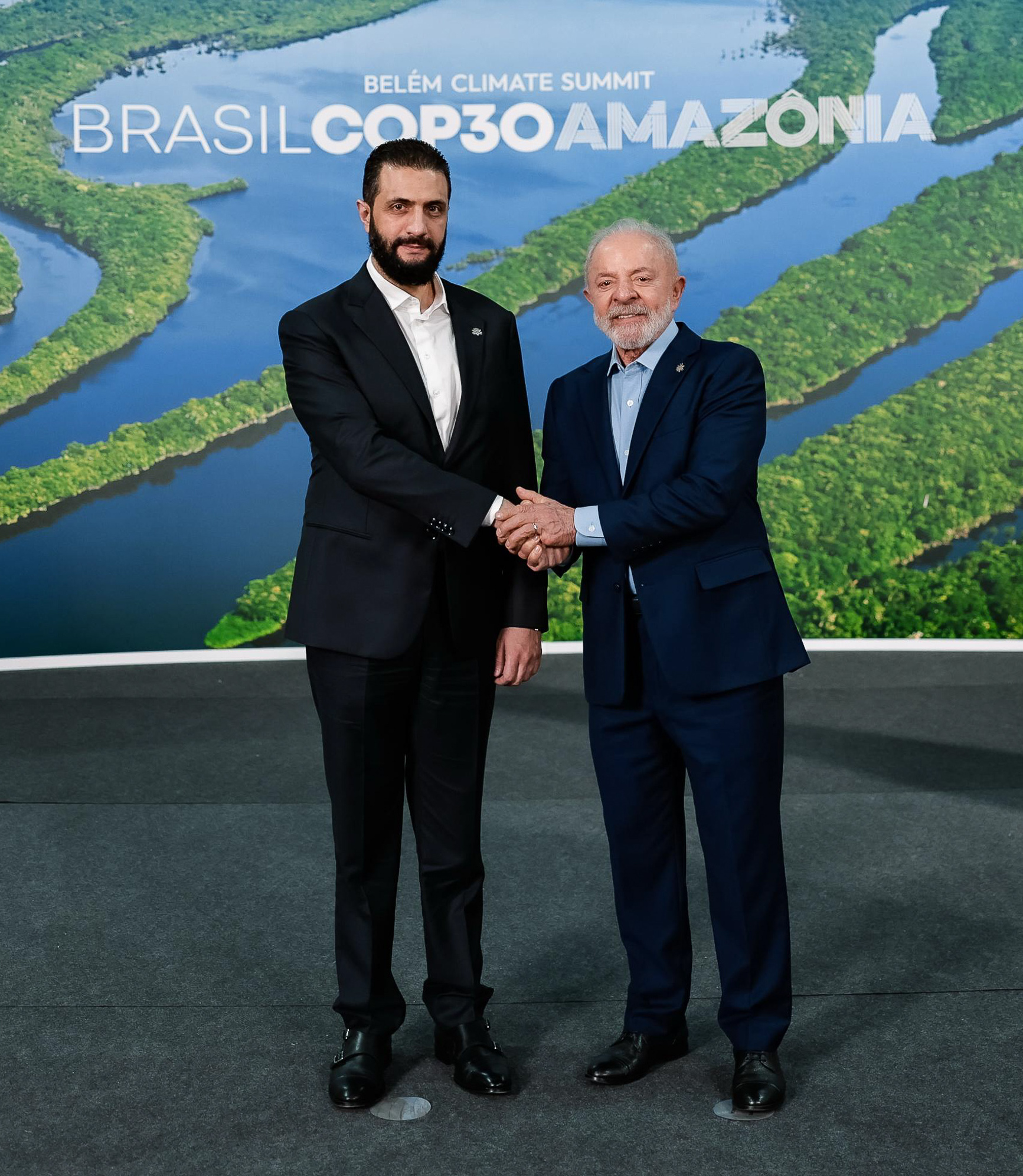
Al-Sharaa with Brazilian President Luiz Inácio Lula da Silva, 6 November 2025

On 15 October, he met with President Vladimir Putin in Russia, declaring Syria's intention to "redefine" its relations while reaffirming existing agreements, and marking the first official visit since the fall of Kremlin ally Bashar al-Assad; Putin praised Syria's recent election and expressed support for continued cooperation.

On 29 October, he met with Saudi Crown Prince Mohammed bin Salman and Kosovan President Vjosa Osmani in Saudi Arabia, during which Syria officially recognized the Republic of Kosovo as an independent and sovereign state, following a trilateral meeting in Riyadh that included officials from Syria, Saudi Arabia, and Kosovo.

In November 2025, al-Sharaa arrived in Brazil to attend the 2025 United Nations Climate Change Conference, marking the first time a Syrian president has participated in the annual climate summit since its establishment in 1995. On 10 November, al-Sharaa met U.S. President Donald Trump in the Oval Office, marking the first visit by a Syrian president to the White House since Syria gained independence in 1946, during which Trump praised al-Sharaa as a "strong leader" and expressed confidence in him, saying, "We'll do everything we can to make Syria successful." Before the visit, Syria formally joined the US-led coalition against the Islamic State.

On 28 January 2026, al-Sharaa met with President Vladimir Putin in Moscow for the second time to discuss Russia's military presence in Syria, during which Putin reaffirmed Moscow's support for Syria's unity and territorial integrity, congratulated Damascus on recent political developments, and expressed hope that the return of the al-Jazira region would advance the full restoration of Syrian sovereignty, while both sides also emphasised continued economic and reconstruction cooperation.

Two months later, on 30 March, al-Sharaa visited Berlin, where he met with President Frank-Walter Steinmeier and Chancellor Friedrich Merz. The visit included talks with a German government and business delegation, focusing on Syria's reconstruction, refugee return, and economic cooperation.

On 31 March, al-Sharaa met UK Prime Minister Keir Starmer in London to discuss cooperation, security, and reconstruction. The following day, he was received by King Charles III at Buckingham Palace, in a symbolic step reflecting renewed engagement between the United Kingdom and Syria. Al-Sharaa became the first Syrian head of state to visit London since former president Bashar al-Assad visited the United Kingdom in 2002.

On 8 July, al-Sharaa met U.S. President Donald Trump on the sidelines of the 2026 NATO summit in Ankara, Turkey to discuss Syrian–American relations and regional issues. Trump praised al-Sharaa as a "fantastic" and "highly respected" leader and said he expected to remove Syria from the U.S. list of state sponsors of terrorism, potentially opening the way for greater economic engagement.

=== Easing sanctions in Syria ===
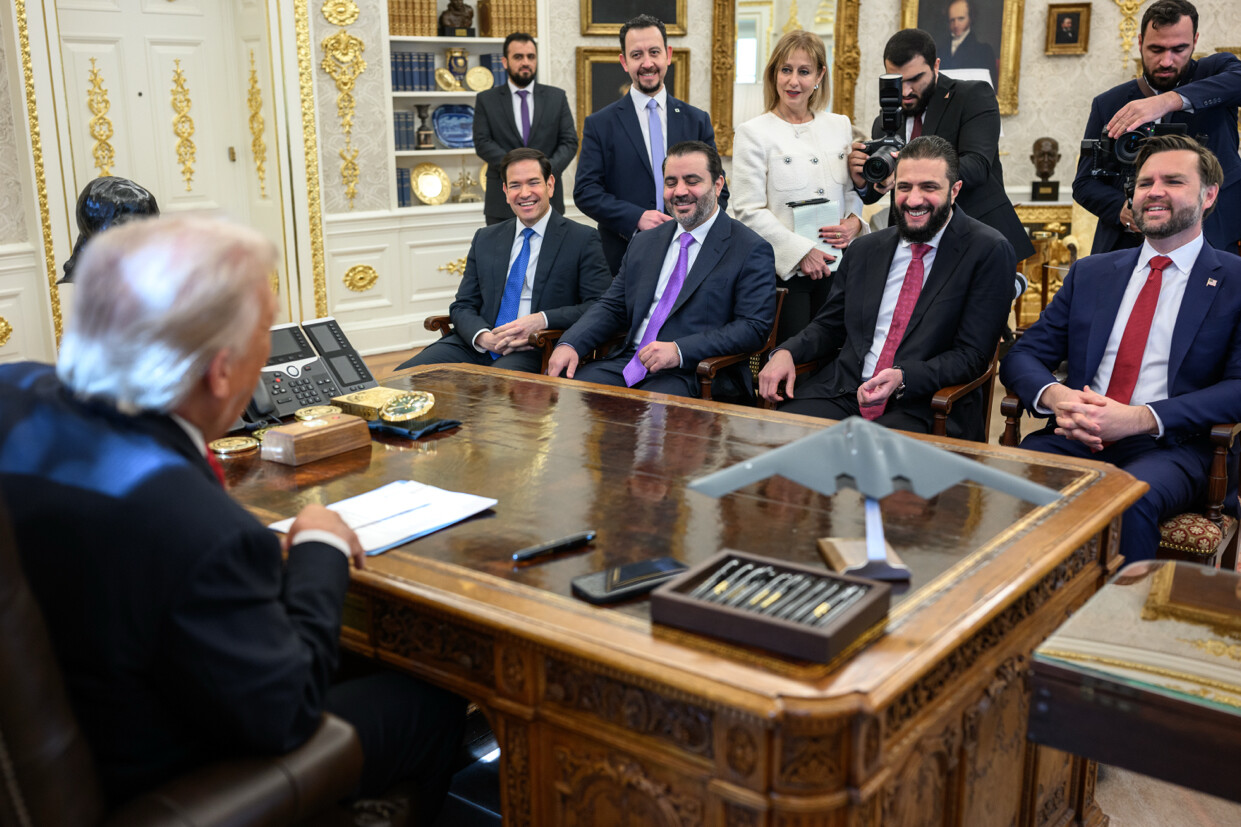
Al-Sharaa in the Oval Office with U.S. Secretary of State Marco Rubio, Syrian Foreign Minister Asaad al-Shaibani, U.S. Vice President JD Vance, and U.S. President Donald Trump, 10 November 2025

Since 2011, several countries and international bodies have imposed sanctions on Syria under Bashar al-Assad's rule, mainly due to the regime's violent crackdown on civilians during the civil war. In an interview with The New York Times in April 2025, al-Sharaa stated that the sanctions should be permanently lifted, as they were imposed on the Assad regime. He noted that the sanctions were damaging his government and slowing economic recovery.

The following month, Trump and the European Union communicated intentions to relax sanctions against Syria. In May 2025, the Trump administration issued a 180-day waiver under the Caesar Syria Civilian Protection Act to ease certain sanctions and support humanitarian relief and early recovery efforts in Syria, and on 30 June, Trump signed an executive order lifting U.S. sanctions on Syria, except those targeting the Assad family, their associates, and related institutions.

In November 2025, with the support of the United States and other countries, the UN Security Council removed al-Sharaa and Syrian Interior Minister Anas Khattab from the sanctions list of the ISIL and Al-Qaida Sanctions Committee. On 7 November, the United States also delisted him from its Specially Designated Global Terrorist (SDGT) sanctions list, while the United Kingdom announced the removal of both him and Khattab from its consolidated sanctions list, stating that he was no longer subject to asset freezes.

The waiver was extended for an additional 180 days in November 2025 following meetings between U.S. officials and al-Sharaa, signaling a shift toward conditional engagement while retaining legal pressure mechanisms, and in December 2025, the United States Congress voted to repeal the Caesar Act as part of the National Defense Authorization Act for Fiscal Year 2026, which, according to France 24, passed the Senate by a vote of 77–20 after prior approval by the House of Representatives and was sent to President Trump for signature, before being signed into law on 18 December 2025.

On 8 July 2026, Secretary of State Marco Rubio notified Congress that President Donald Trump decided to rescind Syria's designation as a state sponsor of terrorism. Under U.S. law, the notification started a 45-day congressional review before the rescission could take effect. The mandatory 45-day congressional review period ended on 22 August without any reported action to block the move, with the final step being the formal publication of the rescission in the Federal Register by Secretary of State Marco Rubio. On 24 August, Syria's designation was formally removed by the Department of State.

== Opinion polling ==
In January 2026, a YouGov opinion poll conducted by the Council for a Secure America showed largely favourable views of Ahmed al-Sharaa's presidency among Syrians, with 69% of respondents rating his performance as "good," 12% rating it as poor, and 19% saying they were undecided.

== Notes ==
Syrian presidential administrations
Preceded by Himself as De facto leader	President of Syria; 2025–present	Incumbent
Head of state of Syria
Preceded by Bashar al-Assad as President	Himself as De facto leader 2024–2025	Succeeded by Himself as President
