= Proposed handover of Bashar al-Assad to Syria =

Extradition of Syria's former president from Russia

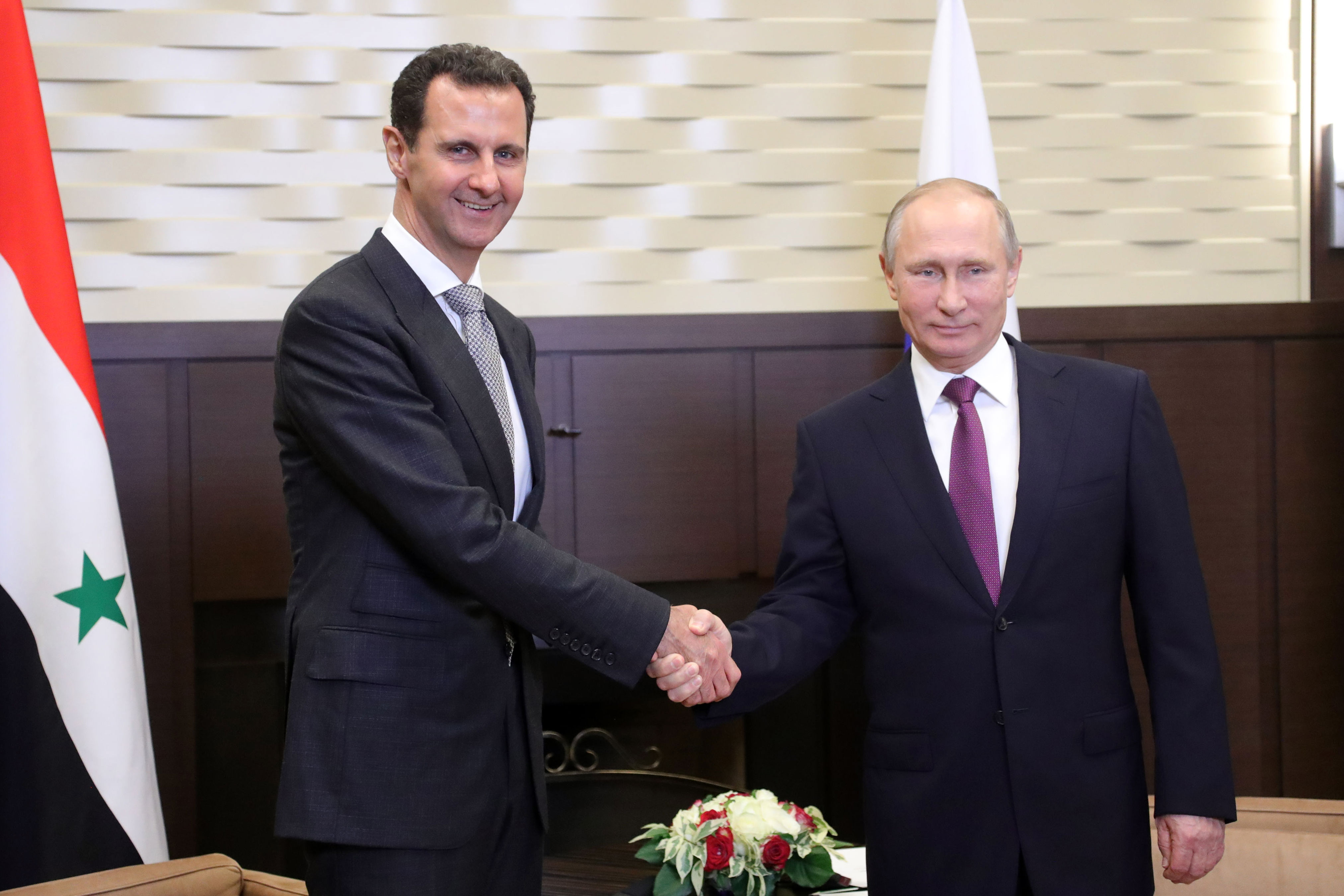
Bashar al-Assad with Vladimir Putin in 2017

The Syrian government has requested that Russia handover former Syrian President Bashar al-Assad to Syria on multiple occasions so that he can be tried for crimes against humanity and potentially other charges stemming mainly from his violent crackdown on the Syrian revolution. Bashar al-Assad served as President of Syria until his flight to Russia during the fall of the Assad regime where he was granted asylum by the Russian government. Discussions over the handover of al-Assad are a recurring dispute between Syria and Russia, who were closely aligned under the leadership of al-Assad.

== Background ==
Bashar al-Assad was the president of Syria from 2000 until his overthrow on 8 December 2024. His presidency was characterized by authoritarian rule and the suppression of political dissent. His government faced mounting criticism for corruption, human rights abuses, and the violent crackdown on the 2011 protests, which eventually led to the outbreak of the Syrian civil war.

The war involved numerous international actors, with countries like Russia and Iran supporting Assad's regime, while opposition groups received backing from Western and regional powers. On 8 December 2024, after a series of offensives by the Syrian armed opposition, Assad was overthrown and imposed a self-exile along with his wife Asma al-Assad in Moscow, Russia, where he was granted asylum together with his family.

Immediately following the fall of Damascus, advancing rebel forces dispatched scouting teams to locate and apprehend Assad, and announced a 10 million US$ reward for information leading to his capture.

== Exile ==
On 20 September 2025, while in exile in Moscow, Bashar al-Assad was hospitalized in critical condition. The Syrian Observatory for Human Rights has alleged he was poisoned in his home, though not specifying whether this was intentional or accidental. He was eventually discharged nine days later. On 13 October 2025, Russian Foreign Minister Sergey Lavrov denied reports that Assad was poisoned, saying Russia granted asylum to Assad and his family for humanitarian reasons and that Assad "has no issues living in our capital."

On 8 October 2025, the German outlet Die Zeit reported that Assad and his family had settled into a luxury skyscraper apartment, where he reportedly made occasional visits to a shopping mall and spent much of his time playing online games while remaining under Putin's protection and control. The Guardian reported that Assad was likely residing in the upscale neighbourhood of Rublyovka, had returned to his medical training, and was back in the classroom, studying Russian and taking ophthalmology lessons.

In June 2026, the Yedioth Ahronoth newspaper stated that the family had requested relocation to Abu Dhabi; however, the UAE refused due to security considerations, such as the threat of assassination or being targeted.

== Handover demands ==
The first request for Russia to hand over Bashar al-Assad reportedly came in January 2025, during the first visit by a Russian delegation to Syria after the fall of the Assad regime. The request was allegedly made by then de facto leader Ahmed al-Sharaa, who later became president, to a Russian delegation led by Deputy Foreign Minister Mikhail Bogdanov. The Kremlin refused to comment on the matter.

In February 2025, Syrian Defense Minister Murhaf Abu Qasra was asked in an interview with The Washington Post whether President al-Sharaa had formally requested Assad's extradition. He declined to confirm but acknowledged that discussions about holding Assad accountable had taken place.

By early March 2025, Reuters reported that during the January meeting, Syrian officials had briefly raised the possibility of Assad returning to Syria but did not consider it a major obstacle to restoring relations. A senior Russian official stated that Moscow would not agree to extradite Assad and had not been formally asked to do so. On 10 March 2025, in an interview with Reuters, al-Sharaa declined to confirm whether he had made such a request to Moscow.

Meanwhile, on 6 March 2025, the Wall Street Journal, citing Syrian and European officials, reported that Russia was negotiating an agreement with Syria to maintain its military bases and secure various investment contracts. As part of these talks, Damascus allegedly requested Assad's handover, but Russia refused to discuss the issue.

On 22 March 2025, Al Arabiya reported, citing unnamed sources, that al-Sharaa had asked Russian President Vladimir Putin to hand over Assad for trial in Syria. On 7 April 2025, Russian Ambassador to Iraq Elbrus Kutrashev told the Islamic Republic News Agency that Assad's settlement in Moscow was conditional on his total withdrawal from media and political activities. He added that the asylum granted to Assad and his family had been personally ordered by Putin and would remain unchanged.

In an interview with The New York Times in April 2025, al-Sharaa said that Syrian officials requested Russia to extradite Assad as a condition for allowing their military presence in Syria, but Russia refused.

On 5 August 2025, Abdulbaset Abdullatif, head of the National Commission for Transitional Justice in Syria, stated in an interview with Al Arabiya that the commission was engaging with Interpol and all relevant international bodies to seek the legal prosecution of Bashar al-Assad, his brother Maher al-Assad—the former commander of the 4th Armoured Division—and additional individuals. (Note: Maher al-Assad was reportedly spotted in Moscow in June 2025.) However, Fadel Abdul Ghany, director of the Syrian Network for Human Rights, told Syria TV that the National Commission for Transitional Justice was not the competent authority to engage with Interpol regarding the prosecution of the former president. He explained that Interpol only processes such requests through the National Central Bureau of each member state, which in Syria is under the jurisdiction of the Ministry of Interior. Abdul Ghany added that direct contact from non-authorized bodies, whether by email or official correspondence, carries no legal weight and typically results only in a formal acknowledgment of receipt. He compared the situation to cases where individuals or organizations have submitted documents to the International Criminal Court and received nothing more than a confirmation of submission without legal effect.

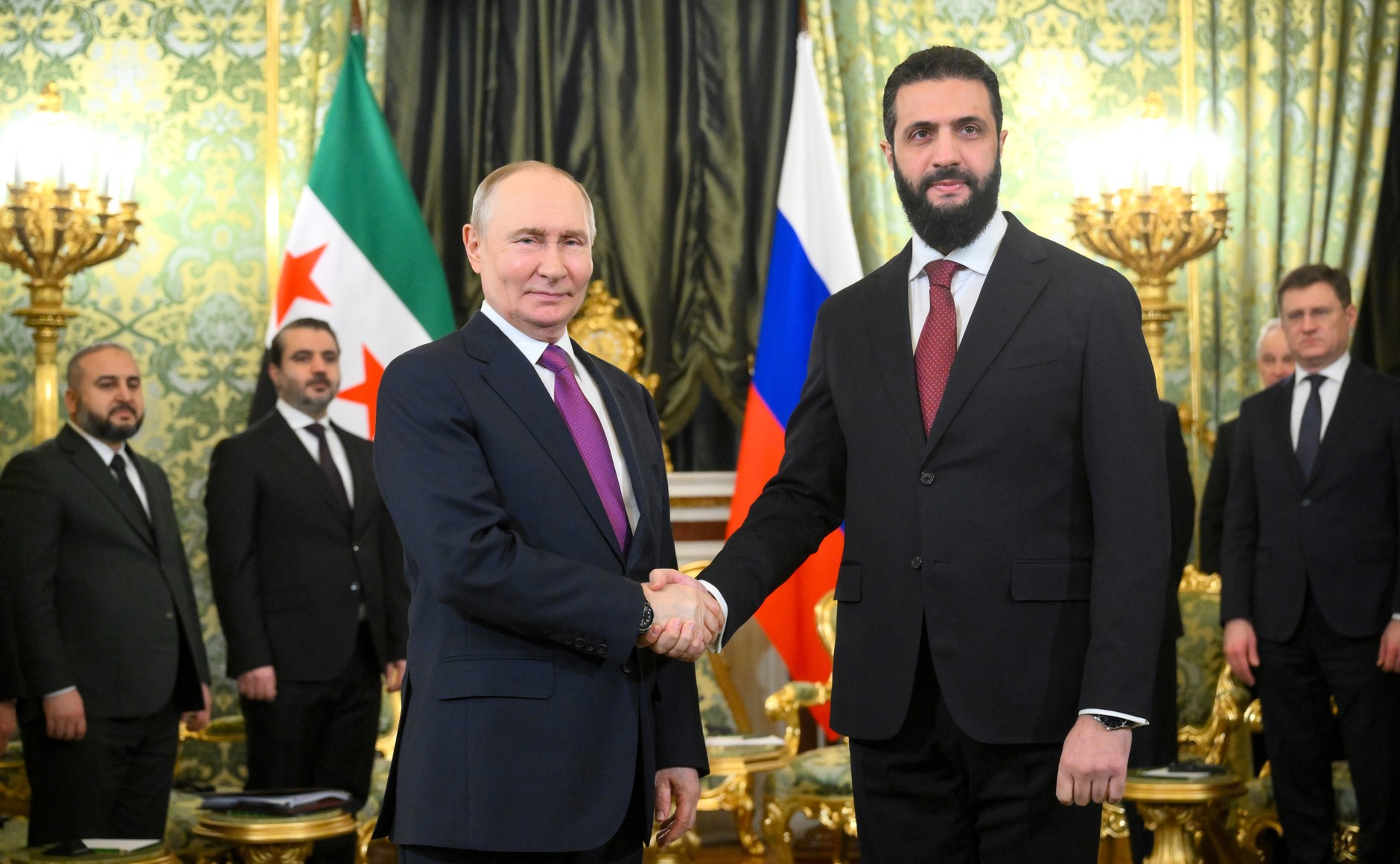
Ahmed al-Sharaa with Vladimir Putin in Moscow in 2026

On 27 September 2025, a Syrian court issued an arrest warrant for Assad over the 2011 Daraa incidents, paving the way for its circulation through Interpol and international prosecution. The arrest warrant cited charges such as premeditated murder, torture leading to death, and deprivation of liberty, and was based on lawsuits submitted by the families of victims in Daraa governorate over events that occurred in November 2011.

In a September 2025 interview with 60 Minutes, al-Sharaa said he still intends to pursue justice against Assad through legal means.

On 15 October 2025, al-Sharaa visited Moscow, Russia, where he met with Russian President Vladimir Putin. According to Syrian officials, discussions during the visit were also expected to include a request for the handover of Assad. On 16 October 2025, Kremlin spokesperson Dmitry Peskov refused to comment on whether extraditing Assad was raised during talks, saying, "We have nothing to report on Assad here; we have nothing to report in this context." In an interview with Syrian media, Ashhad Salibi, the deputy director of the Department of Russia and Eastern Europe at the Syrian Ministry of Foreign Affairs and Expatriates, stated that al-Sharaa explicitly demanded during his meeting with Putin to extradite Assad. On 5 November 2025, Russian Ambassador to Iraq Elbrus Kutrashev told the Rudaw Media Network that Bashar al-Assad's extradition was not raised during Ahmed al-Sharaa's visit. The Ambassador said that Assad is in the country for humanitarian reasons, is barred from political and media activities, and cannot be extradited because his life would be at risk.

In a Fox News interview on 10 November 2025, al-Sharaa said that Russia has a different view on sending wanted individuals back to Syria, but he stressed that justice must be carried out through a transitional justice committee to ensure accountability for all perpetrators, including Assad. In a November 2025 interview with The Washington Post, al-Sharaa said that the issue of Bashar al-Assad remains sensitive for Russia, with Syria's relationship with Moscow still in its early stages, and emphasized that "Syria will preserve its right to demand Assad’s trial."

On 26 January 2026, al-Sharaa visited Moscow, Russia for the second time, where he met Putin. According to Al Jazeera, the Kremlin has not said whether it will grant his repeated requests for Bashar al-Assad's extradition. On 22 February 2026, Syrian Justice Minister Mazhar al-Wais stated that the government was pushing for the extradition of former President Bashar al-Assad and his allies as part of its transitional justice efforts.

== Analysis ==
In August 2025, Syrian analyst Hussam Talib told Enab Baladi that Russia is unlikely to hand over Bashar al-Assad to Damascus, explaining that since he has been granted asylum, Moscow has no intention of extraditing him and may instead focus on recovering looted Syrian funds or restricting the activities of Assad, his family, and associates.

In October 2025, The Guardian reported that Moscow was unlikely to extradite Assad, citing its record as a refuge for fugitives such as Ukraine's former president Viktor Yanukovych and the former Wirecard executive Jan Marsalek. Syrian journalist Omar Alhariri told TRT World that Russia would never surrender Assad to Syria, “as the matter appears deeply personal, tied directly to Vladimir Putin himself, who granted Assad asylum through a personal decision.”

== See also ==
- Capture of Mohammad Kanjo Hassan
- Capture and trial of Saddam Hussein
- Killing of Muammar Gaddafi
- Capture and trial of Nicolás Maduro
