= Opinion polling on the Ahmed al-Sharaa presidency =

Surveying on the Syrian administration since 2025

This article summarizes the results of polls conducted during the presidency of Ahmed al-Sharaa, which gather and analyse public opinion on his administration's performance and policies.

== 2025 ==
Fieldwork date(s)	Pollster	Sample size	Approve	Disapprove	Undecided/no opinion
March	The Economist	1,500	81	19	49
14–21 October	Council for a Secure America	257	61	13	12
29 October–17 November	Arab Barometer	1,229	81	-	-
11–20 November	EtanaSyria	1,515	63	20	-

== 2026 ==
Fieldwork date(s)	Pollster	Sample size	Approve	Disapprove	Undecided/no opinion
8–15 January	Council for a Secure America	260	69	12	11

== See also ==
- List of heads of the executive by approval rating
