= Political strongman =

Authoritarian political leader

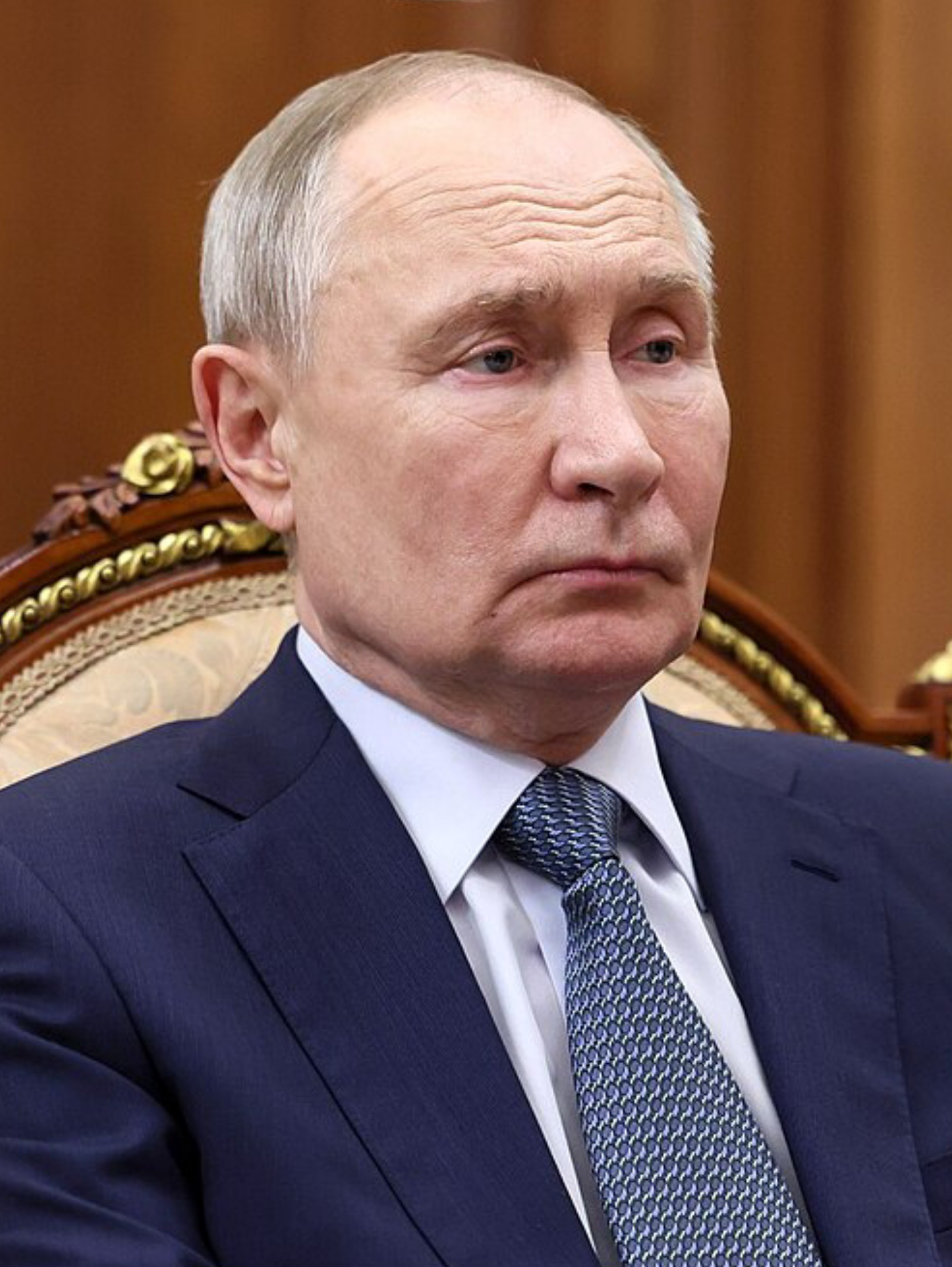
British journalist Gideon Rachman described Vladimir Putin as "the archetype and the model" for modern political strongmen.

In politics, a strongman is a type of authoritarian political leader who exerts control through military enforcement and has, or has claimed to have, strong popular support. Strongmen typically claim to have widespread popular support, portray themselves as the only one capable of solving the country's problems, and espouse a disdain for liberalism and democracy.

== Functions ==
A strongman can be either a civilian or a military leader and can exist in both democracies and autocracies. Military dictatorships ruled by military strongmen differ from military juntas as the strongman rules alone and does not have to negotiate with other military officers to rule.

Political scientists Brian Lai and Dan Slater identified strongmen as ruling in an autocratic way which exercises power through the military; typically, strongmen do not share power collectively and do not rely on a political party to exert power. Strongmen are more likely to initiate international conflicts than democracies, military juntas, and partisan dictatorships. Political scientists Barbara Geddes, Erica Frantz, and Joseph G. Wright argue that dictatorships led by strongmen are more likely to "commit human rights abuses" and "become embroiled in civil wars" than other dictatorships. They also stated that strongmen are more likely to be overthrown by an insurgency, revolution, or foreign invasion than civilian dictators and military juntas.

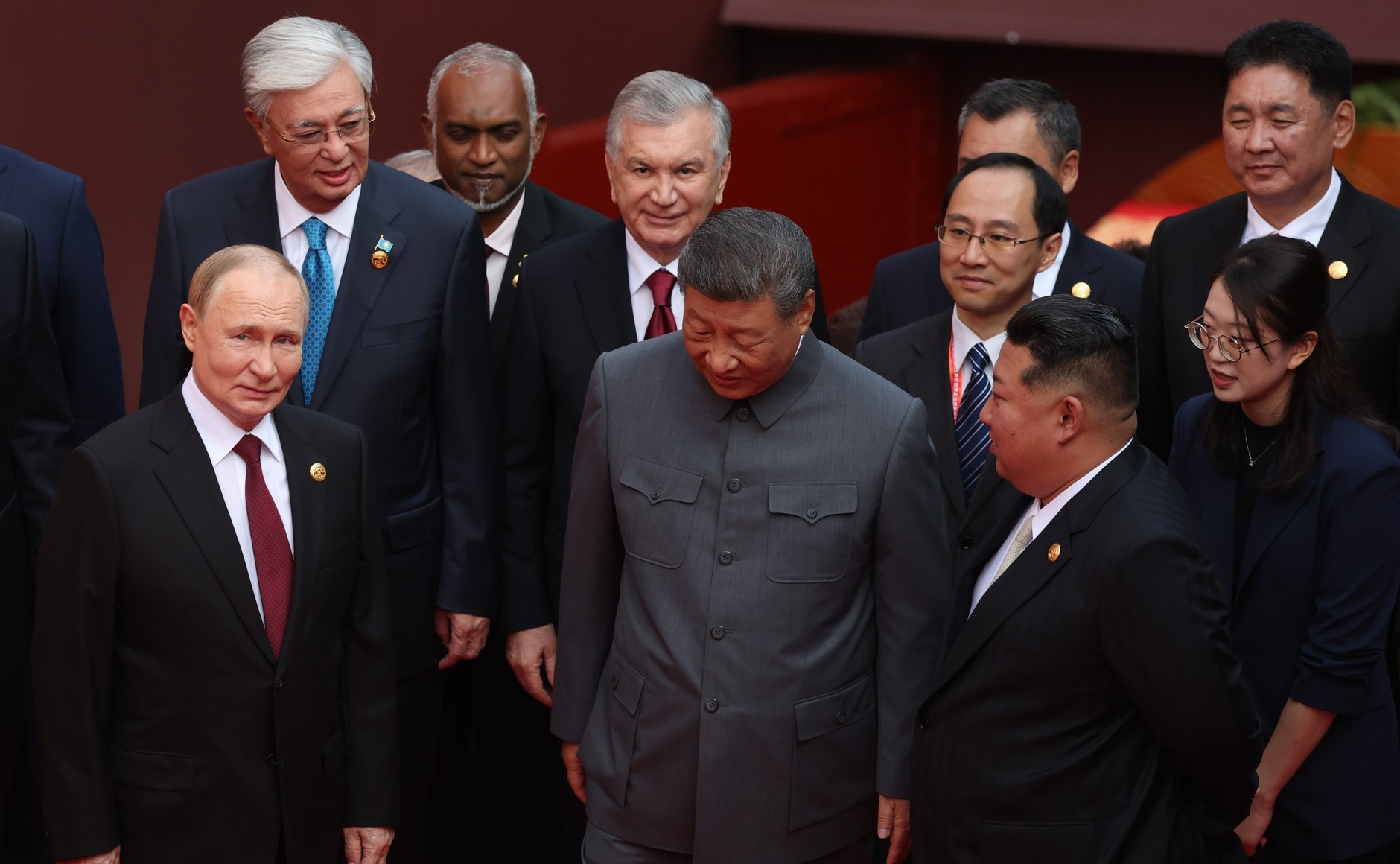
General Secretary Xi Jinping of China, General Secretary Kim Jong Un of North Korea and President Vladimir Putin of Russia met in Beijing.

Regimes led by strongmen are less likely to transition to democracy than military juntas as the strongman is more likely to fear imprisonment or death as a consequence for their actions once out of office more than a collective of military officers likely would. Some scholars described the "strongman's dilemma" as the process of establishing a successor once out of office without creating a political rival. Strongmen typically appoint family members to important government positions, but appointing family members as a successor is also a way to ensure themselves that they would not be imprisoned upon leaving office. Meanwhile, some strongmen attempt to remain in power indefinitely but face the risk of being removed once their health diminishes and rivals seek an opportunity to seize power. Even when overthrown, regimes previously led by strongmen are likely to be continued by another strongman.

Strongmen can assume political office either via democratic institutions or through a forceful seizure of power, such as a coup d'état or a revolution. In situations where a new government is formed democratically, strongmen typically erode a country's democratic institutions to consolidate power through democratic backsliding. In situations where a new government is formed by force, strongmen typically manifest gradually rather than immediately upon assuming power, especially following military coups.

== Politics ==
Strongmen are typically nationalist leaders; they portray themselves as having strong popular support and claim to represent the people "against the elites". Strongmen may also build a cult of personality around themselves and espouse a disdain for liberalism and democracy. Strongmen can push a narrative that they alone have the capability to solve their respective country's problems and wish to be admired "not just for their strength but also for their morality and their intellect". Although almost all strongmen express their distrust or disdain for democracy, many continue to portray themselves as being democratic.

Strong leaders generally express contempt for the rule of law; however, they also utilize the law as a weapon against their political opponents, such as launching investigations into alleged crimes or outright imprisoning their opponents. To exert this authority, strongmen appoint loyalists to their country's judiciary and purge those who the strongman see as disloyal or as a threat.

Strongmen frequently criticize journalists and the press; they may dismiss negative press and information contrary to their rule as "fake news", label anyone who reports said information as an "enemy of the people", and even counter such information through manipulation or with their own reporting. Strongmen utilize social media to reach out to their supporters.

One view sees the trend in strongman politics in terms of "masculine authoritarianism" and of a revival of the great man theory.

== History ==
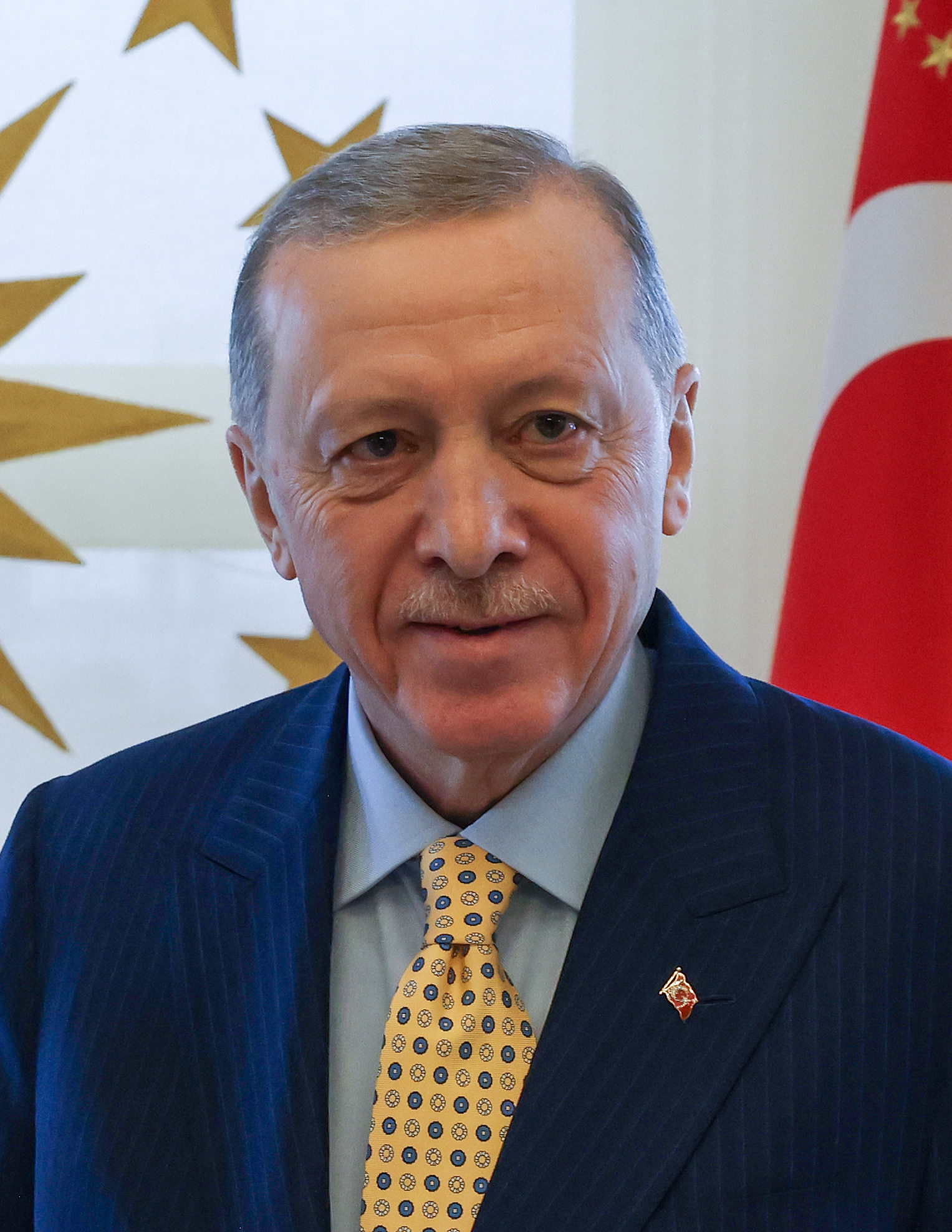
Turkish President Recep Tayyip Erdoğan has been described as a strongman.

Historically, authoritarian leaders, commonly referred to as dictators, exerted political control through mass murder, holding sham elections, and holding total control of the press. Such leaders included Joseph Stalin, Idi Amin, and Augusto Pinochet. Several modern rulers such as Kim Jong Un and Bashar al-Assad exerted their power in a similar manner. Such trends of total control and repression have shifted since the end of the 20th century.

Vladimir Putin is commonly cited as one of the first cases of a modern political strongman, with British journalist Gideon Rachman describing Putin as "the archetype and the model for the current generation of strongman leaders" in his 2022 book The Age of the Strongman. Rachman outlined that Putin began his presidency by portraying himself as respectful of Russia's democratic institutions but slowly consolidated his power over the course of the 2000s and 2010s. Similar to Putin, Recep Tayyip Erdoğan began his rule of Turkey as a liberal reformer, but gradually consolidated his power throughout his premiership and later his presidency. Other post-Soviet leaders have also been described as strongmen, such as Alexander Lukashenko, Gurbanguly Berdimuhamedow, and Nursultan Nazarbayev.

In China, Xi Jinping has been described as a strongman after succeeding the General Secretary of the Chinese Communist Party. Political observers have called Xi the most powerful Chinese Communist Party leader since Mao Zedong, especially since having passed a constitutional amendment in 2018 that removed term limits for the position of President of China. Nevertheless, Xi also holds two concurrent positions, General Secretary of the Chinese Communist Party and Chairman of the Central Military Commission, neither of which have term limits.

In India, Narendra Modi has been described as a strongman. In Syria, Ahmed al-Sharaa has been described as a strongman since his appointment as President of Syria following the fall of the Assad regime. Political analysts said that al-Sharaa consolidated his power by signing a constitutional declaration that granted sweeping powers to the presidency. In Latin America, state leaders such as Daniel Ortega, Nayib Bukele, Hugo Chávez, Nicolás Maduro, Andrés Manuel López Obrador, and Manuel Noriega have been described as strongmen.

== See also ==
- Big man
- Caesarism
- Caudillo
- Demagogue
- Fascism
- Pharaonism
- Political boss
- President for life
- Supreme Leader (disambiguation)
- Warlord
