= Ministry of Sports and Youth (Syria) =

Government ministry of Syria

- وزارة الرياضة والشباب

Agency overview
- Formed: March 29, 2025; 16 months ago
- Preceding agency: General Sports Federation
- Jurisdiction: Syria
- Headquarters: Damascus
- Minister responsible: Mohammad Sameh Hamedh
- Website: www.mosy.sy

The Ministry of Sports and Youth (Arabic: وزارة الرياضة والشباب, romanized: Wizārat al-Riyāḍah wa-al-Shabāb) is a ministry of the government of Syria formed on 29 March 2025. It was created with the formation of the Syrian transitional government to take over responsibilities previously managed by the General Sports Federation, which had served as the highest sports authority in the country since 1971.

== History ==
The Ministry was formed on 29 March 2025 with the formation of the Syrian transitional government.

The ministry replaced the General Sports Federation (Arabic: الاتحاد الرياضي العام), which had served as the highest sports authority in Syria since its establishment in 1971.

The establishment of the ministry reportedly came in response to long-standing demands for the creation of a dedicated body to address youth affairs on one hand, and to end the dominance of the "General Sports Federation" over Syrian sports on the other. The move also aims to ensure accountability by making the ministry answerable for its achievements and activities.

== Tasks ==
During the speech he delivered in front of the Syrian president before taking the oath of office, Minister Mohammed Sameh Hamedh pledged to rehabilitate all stadiums and sports halls in the country that were destroyed during the years of the war.

== Ministers ==
| No. | Name | Term of office | | Ref. |
| No. | Name | Took office | Left office | Ref. |
|---|---|---|---|---|
| 1 | Mohammed Sameh Hamedh | 29 March 2025 | Incumbent | |
