= National Commission for Missing Persons (Syria) =

Commission for investigating the fate of missing persons during the Syrian civil war

- الهيئة الوطنية للمفقودين
- The Commission's Headquarters in Damascus

Commission overview
- Formed: 17 May 2025; 17 months ago
- Jurisdiction: Syria
- Status: Active
- Headquarters: Damascus
- Commission executive: Mohammad Reda Jalkhi, Head

The National Commission for Missing Persons (Arabic: الهيئة الوطنية للمفقودين) is a governmental body in Syria responsible for investigating the fate of missing and forcibly disappeared persons, documenting cases, and supporting their families through legal and humanitarian means.

== Background ==
The Syrian civil war has led to a large number of disappearances, many of which remain unresolved. Victims include those detained without acknowledgment, abducted, or otherwise lost in the context of war. Human rights organizations and families of the missing have repeatedly called for an official mechanism to clarify the fate of these individuals. In response, the Syrian transitional government established the National Commission for the Missing as a dedicated national institution to address this humanitarian and legal crisis.

== Establishment ==
The commission was established on 17 May 2025 by Decree No. 19 of the year 2025, issued by President Ahmed al-Sharaa. Mohammad Reda Jalkhi was appointed as head of the commission and was given a deadline of 30 days from the date of the decree to form a working team and draft the internal regulations necessary for the functioning of the commission.

UN High Commissioner for Human Rights, Volker Türk, welcomed the formation of the commission and said that its formation is an integral step towards building a better future for all Syrians.

The European Union welcomed the formation of the commission, calling it an important step towards the comprehensive justice and truth which the Syrian people deserve.

== Mandate ==
The Commission is tasked with:

- Investigating cases of missing and forcibly disappeared persons.
- Establishing and maintaining a national database of all documented cases.
- Providing legal and humanitarian support to affected families.
- Coordinating with relevant state institutions and international bodies.

== Legal status and structure ==
The commission operates with full legal personality and administrative and financial independence. Its authority extends across all Syrian territory.

== See also ==
- National Commission for Transitional Justice (Syria)
- Enforced disappearance
- Human rights in Ba'athist Syria
- Political prisoners in Ba'athist Syria
- War crimes in the Syrian civil war
