= Mohammad Reda Jalkhi =

Syrian official and academic

- محمد رضا جلخي

Head of the National Commission for the Missing
- Incumbent
- Assumed office 17 May 2025
- President: Ahmed al-Sharaa

Personal details
- Born: Salqin, Idlib, Syria
- Education: Idlib University

Mohammad Reda Jalkhi (Arabic: محمد رضا جلخي) (Note: Also spelled "محمد رضى جلخي") is a Syrian official and academic. On 17 May 2025, he was appointed head of the National Commission for the Missing.

== Early life and education ==
He was born in Salqin, Idlib Governorate. He earned a PhD in international law at Idlib University in 2023.

== Career ==
He has held several administrative positions in higher education, including serving as Secretary of Idlib University since 2024, a member of the committee charged with running Damascus University, serving in the Faculty of Political Science and Media in Idlib University, and as Vice President of Idlib University for Administrative Affairs.

After the fall of the Assad regime, he was appointed Dean of the Faculty of Political Science at Damascus University in 2025.

On 6 February 2025, he was appointed to serve on the Board of Trustees of the Syrian Development Organization, formerly known as the Syrian Trust for Development.

On 18 February 2025, he was appointed chairman of the Board of Trustees of Syrian Virtual University by Minister of Higher Education Marwan al-Halabi.

On 2 March 2025, he was appointed a member of the committee tasked with drafting the Syrian Constitutional Declaration.

On 17 May 2025, he was appointed chairman of the National Commission for the Missing, an independent body tasked with investigating the fates of missing and forcibly disappeared persons.
