= List of ambassadors of Russia to Iraq =

Ambassador of the Russian Federation to the Republic of Iraq
- سفير الاتحاد الروسي لدى جمهورية العراق
- Emblem of the Ministry of Foreign Affairs

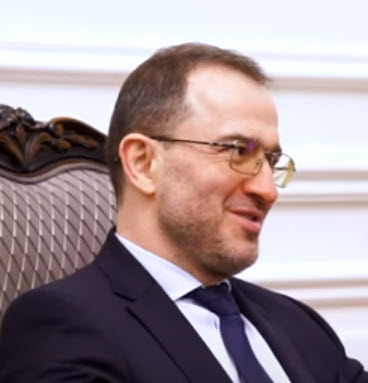
- Incumbent; Elbrus Kutrashev since 8 April 2021
- Ministry of Foreign Affairs; Embassy of Russia in Baghdad
- Style: His Excellency; The Honorable
- Reports to: Minister of Foreign Affairs
- Residence: The Embassy
- Seat: Baghdad, Iraq
- Appointer: The president
- Term length: At the pleasure of the president
- Formation: 29 November 1944
- First holder: Grigory Zaitsev
- Website: Embassy of Russia- Baghdad

The ambassador extraordinary and plenipotentiary of the Russian Federation to the Republic of Iraq is the official representative of the president and the government of the Russian Federation to the prime minister and the government of Iraq.

The ambassador and his staff work at large in the Embassy of Russia in Baghdad. There is a Russian consulate-general in Erbil. The current ambassador is Elbrus Kutrashev, incumbent since 8 April 2021.

== Background ==
The historic relations between Russia and Iraq began when the latter was part of the Ottoman Empire. The Russian imperial government still showed wide interest in the region. Since the 19th century, a Russian consulate was functioning in Baghdad, due to the Shia Muslims' pilgrimage to the holy cities of Baghdad, Karbala and Najaf. After the Russian Empire annexed the North Caucasus and Central Asia this further increased due to the large Shia populations native to those regions. According to the Russian consul in Baghdad on 19 November 1890, 19,500 pilgrims from the North Caucasus and Central Asia visited the holy shrines in Iraq. However, after the end of the Ottoman rule in the region, the diplomatic mission was ended.

Soviet Union re-established diplomatic ties with newly independent Iraq on 9 September 1944. In 1955, relations were disrupted by the Iraqi side. In July 1958, both countries resumed diplomatic relations.

=== Timeline of the diplomatic relations ===
- 25 August - 9 September 1944 - diplomatic relations were established at the mission level.
- 3 January - 8 January 1955 - diplomatic relations were interrupted by the Iraqi government.
- 18 July 1958 - an agreement was reached on the resumption of diplomatic relations at the embassy level.

== List of representatives (1944–present) ==
=== Soviet Union to the Kingdom of Iraq (1944–1958) ===
Name	Title	Appointment	Termination	Notes
Grigory Zaitsev	Envoy	29 November 1944	20 January 1949	
Ivan Yakushin	Chargé d'affaires	1952	8 January 1955	
Diplomatic relations interrupted (1955 - 1958)

=== Soviet Union to the First Iraqi Republic (1958–1968) ===
Name	Title	Appointment	Termination	Notes
Grigory Zaitsev	Ambassador	31 July 1958	15 October 1961	
Mikhail Yakovlev	Ambassador	15 October 1961	7 August 1965	
Vasily Nikolayev	Ambassador	7 August 1965	1968	

=== Soviet Union to the Second Iraqi Republic (1968–1991) ===
Name	Title	Appointment	Termination	Notes
Vasily Nikolayev	Ambassador	1968	17 December 1969	
Veniamin Likhachyov	Ambassador	20 February 1970	29 December 1973	
Anatoly Barkovsky	Ambassador	29 December 1973	17 March 1982	
Viktor Minin	Ambassador	17 March 1982	19 December 1989	
Viktor Posluvalyuk	Ambassador	13 March 1990	25 December 1991	

=== Russian Federation to the Second Iraqi Republic (1991–2003) ===
Name	Title	Appointment	Termination	Notes
Viktor Posluvalyuk	Ambassador	13 March 1990	22 April 1992	
Nikolai Kartuzov	Ambassador	22 August 1994	6 August 1999	
Aleksandr Shein	Ambassador	9 August 1999	29 March 2002	
Vladimir Titorenko	Ambassador	29 March 2002	16 May 2003	

=== Russian Federation to the Coalition Provisional Authority (2003–2004) ===
Name	Title	Appointment	Termination	Notes
Vladimir Titorenko	Ambassador	16 May 2003	8 December 2003	
Ilya Morgunov	Chargé d'affaires	8 December 2003	28 June 2004	

=== Russian Federation to the Republic of Iraq (2004–present) ===
Name	Title	Appointment	Termination	Notes
Ilya Morgunov	Chargé d'affaires	28 June 2004	3 March 2005	
Vladimir Chamov	Ambassador	3 March 2005	16 October 2008	
Valerian Shuvaev	Ambassador	16 October 2008	2 March 2012	
Ilya Morgunov	Ambassador	2 March 2012	3 October 2016	
Maksim Maksimov	Ambassador	3 October 2016	8 April 2021	
Elbrus Kutrashev	Ambassador	8 April 2021		

== See also ==
- Foreign relations of Iraq
