= Abdulbaset Abdullatif =

Syrian politician (born 1963)

- عبد الباسط عبد اللطيف

Head of the National Commission for Transitional Justice
- Incumbent
- Assumed office 17 May 2025
- President: Ahmed al-Sharaa

Secretary of the Political Committee of the Syrian National Coalition
- In office 2023 – 12 February 2025
- President: Hadi al-Bahra
- Prime Minister: Abdurrahman Mustafa
- Preceded by: Abdulmajeed Barakat
- Succeeded by: Position abolished

Secretary General of the National Coalition of Syrian Revolutionary and Opposition Forces
- In office 29 June 2019 – 12 July 2021
- President: Anas al-Abdah (2019–2020); Nasr al-Hariri (2020–2021)
- Prime Minister: Abdurrahman Mustafa
- Preceded by: Nazir al-Hakim
- Succeeded by: Haytham Rahmeh

Personal details
- Born: 9 January 1963 (age 63) Deir ez-Zor, Syria
- Education: University of Aleppo (LLB)

Military service
- Rank: Brigadier General

Abdulbaset Abdullatif (Note: Arabic: عبد الباسط عبد اللطيف) (born 9 January 1963) is a Syrian politician who formerly served as secretary general of the National Coalition of Syrian Revolutionary and Opposition Forces. On 17 May 2025, he was appointed head of the National Commission for Transitional Justice.

== Early life and education ==
He was born in the city of Deir ez-Zor on 9 January 1963. He earned a bachelor's degree in law from the University of Aleppo in 1986, and first started working as a police officer in 1987. He obtained a postgraduate certificate in police and legal sciences in 2008.

He served as chief of the police force in Qamishli Subdistrict until he defected from the Assad regime in 2012 with the rank of brigadier general and joined the Syrian opposition.

== Political career ==
He served as chief of the political bureau of the Lions of the East Army, and he joined the National Coalition for Syrian Revolutionary and Opposition Forces (Syrian National Coalition) as a military representative. He also served as director of the Bridges of Hope Social Services Organization from 2017 to 2019, and formerly served as vice chairman of the Syrian Supreme Hajj Committee.

In 2018, he was appointed vice president of the Deir ez-Zor Provincial Council in the Syrian Interim Government.

On 29 June 2019, he was elected Secretary General of the Syrian National Coalition with 75 votes, succeeding Nazir al-Hakim. He was reelected with 84 votes on 11 July 2020.

He served as a member of the Syrian Constitutional Committee in September 2019, representing the Syrian opposition.

On 25 December 2019, he signed an agreement to arrange the affairs of Syrian pilgrims for the 2020 Hajj season with Deputy Minister of Hajj and Umrah Abdulfattah Mashat.

On 12 July 2021, he was succeeded by Haytham Rahmeh as Secretary General, and was elected into the Syrian National Coalition's Political Committee by its General Assembly.

On 12 September 2023, he was elected as a member of the Political Committee of the Syrian National Coalition by its General Assembly. Later in 2023, he served as secretary of the Political Committee, succeeding Abdulmajeed Barakat.

On 17 May 2025, he was appointed chairman of the National Commission for Transitional Justice, an independent body tasked with investigating and addressing human rights violations committed during the Assad regime.
