= Elbrus Kutrashev =

Russian diplomat (born 1975)

- Эльбрус Кутрашев
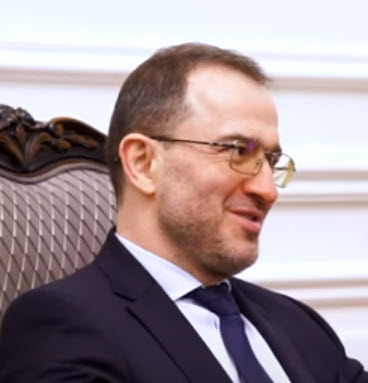
- Kutrashev in 2023

Ambassador Extraordinary and Plenipotentiary of Russia to Iraq
- Incumbent
- Assumed office 8 April 2021
- President: Vladimir Putin
- Preceded by: Maksim Konstantinovich Maksimov

Personal details
- Born: 27 September 1975 (age 49); Grozny, Chechen-Ingush ASSR, RSFSR, USSR
- Education: Moscow State Institute of International Relations
- Awards: Order of Friendship (2024); Medal of the Order "For Merit to the Fatherland", 1st class (2018); Medal of the Order "For Merit to the Fatherland", 2nd class (2013); Medal "For Courage"

Elbrus Kirillovich Kutrashev (Note: Russian: Эльбрус Кириллович Кутрашев) (born 1975), is a Russian diplomat. He serves as the Ambassador of Russia to Iraq.

== Early life and education ==
Kutrashev was born on 27 September 1975 in Grozny and is of Chechen descent. He earned his degree from the Moscow State Institute of International Relations (MGIMO) in 1998. He is reportedly fluent in both English and Arabic.

== Career ==
Kutrashev has been a career diplomat since 1998. From 2003 to 2005, he served at the Russian Embassy in Iraq. Between 2015 and 2018, he held the position of Counselor-Envoy at the Russian Embassy in Syria. From 2018 to 2021, he headed a division within the Middle East and North Africa Department at the Russian Ministry of Foreign Affairs.

Since 8 April 2021, he has served as the Ambassador Extraordinary and Plenipotentiary of the Russian Federation to the Republic of Iraq.

== Awards ==
- Order of Friendship (17 October 2024) — For significant contribution to the implementation of the foreign policy course of the Russian Federation and many years of dedicated diplomatic service.
- Medal of the Order "For Merit to the Fatherland", 1st class (25 September 2018) — For significant contribution to the implementation of the foreign policy course of the Russian Federation and many years of dedicated work.
- Medal of the Order "For Merit to the Fatherland", 2nd class (25 July 2013) — For significant contribution to the implementation of the foreign policy course of the Russian Federation in the Syrian direction.
- Medal "For Courage".

== Personal life ==
Kutrashev is married, with two sons and two daughters.
