= Syrian national anthem =

Syrian national anthem may refer to:

- Ḥumāt ad-Diyār (English: Guardians of the Homeland), de jure national anthem with an ambiguous status after the fall of the Ba'athist regime.
- Fī Sabīli al-Majd (English: In pursuit of Glory), de facto used as an anthem for Syria after the fall of the Ba'athist regime.
