= Mohammad Sameh Hamedh =

Syrian politician

- محمد سامح حامض

Minister of Youth and Sports
- Incumbent
- Assumed office 29 March 2025
- President: Ahmed al-Sharaa
- Preceded by: Position established

Personal details
- Born: 1976 (age 49–50) Kafr Takharim, Idlib, Syria

Mohammad Sameh Hamedh (Arabic: محمد سامح حامض; born 1976) is a Syrian politician and sports official who serves as the country's first Minister of Youth and Sports since March 2025.

== Life and career ==
Hamedh was born in 1976 and is known for his long involvement in Syrian sports. He began his career as a basketball player, later earning certifications in basketball coaching and officiating at the second and third levels.

He managed Kafr Takharim Club from 2008 to 2011 and later served as president of the Nukhba Club between 2018 and 2021. From 2021 to 2024, he was the director of the General Directorate of Youth and Sports in the Syrian Salvation Government, where he played a role in rehabilitating the municipal stadium in Idlib and founding sports federations for team and individual sports, as well as athletics.

Following the fall of the Assad regime, Hamedh was appointed head of the General Sports Federation in 2024, replacing Firas Moualla. He later transitioned to lead the newly established ministry of youth and sports in the Syrian transitional government. On 9 April 2026, Hamedh announced he was resigning from his office due to health reasons, but president Ahmed al-Sharaa said he did not accept the resignation.
