= Presidency of Bashar al-Assad =

Syrian presidential administration from 2000 to 2024

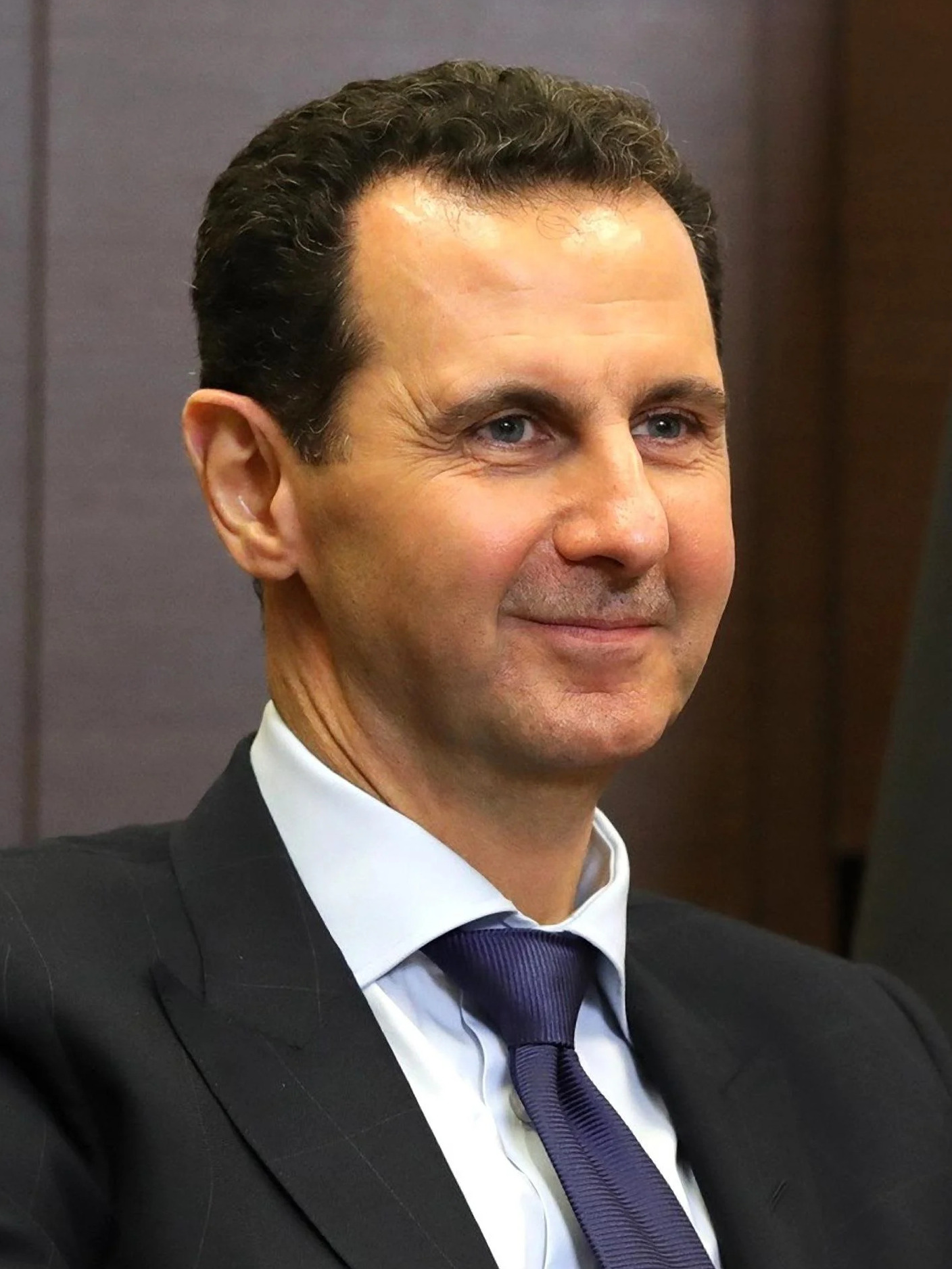
- Presidency of Bashar al-Assad; 17 July 2000 – 8 December 2024
- Party: Ba'ath Party
- Election: 2000; 2007; 2014; 2021
- Seat: Presidential Palace, Damascus

Bashar al-Assad became president of Syria on 17 July 2000, succeeding his father Hafez al-Assad, who had died the month prior. Assad served until his overthrow on 8 December 2024, during the Syrian civil war.

Assad's early economic liberalisation programs worsened inequalities and centralized the socio-political power of the loyalist Damascene elite of the Assad family, alienating the Syrian rural population, urban working classes, businessmen, industrialists, and people from once-traditional Ba'ath strongholds. The Cedar Revolution in Lebanon in February 2005, triggered by the assassination of Lebanese Prime Minister Rafic Hariri, forced Assad to end the Syrian occupation of Lebanon.

In 2011 Arab Spring protests began in Syria to which Assad responded with a brutal crackdown during the events of the Syrian revolution, which led to the Syrian civil war. The United States, European Union, and the majority of the Arab League called for Assad to resign. The civil war has killed around 580,000 people, of which a minimum of 306,000 deaths are non-combatant; according to the Syrian Network for Human Rights, pro-Assad forces caused more than 90% of those civilian deaths. The Assad government perpetrated numerous war crimes during the course of the Syrian civil war, while its army has carried out several attacks with chemical weapons (most notably, the Ghouta chemical attack which killed hundreds mostly civilians on 21 August 2013) The UN High Commissioner for Human Rights stated that findings from an inquiry by the UN implicated Assad in war crimes, and he faced international investigations and condemnation for his actions.

In November 2024, a coalition of Syrian rebels mounted several offensives with the intention of ousting Assad. On the morning of 8 December, as rebel troops first entered Damascus, Assad fled to Moscow and was granted political asylum by the Russian government. Later that day, Damascus fell to rebel forces, and Assad's regime collapsed. After his departure, mass graves were discovered with the largest believed to contain 100,000 bodies of those who opposed Assad’s administration.

Academics and analysts characterized Assad's presidency as a highly personalist dictatorship, which governed Syria as a totalitarian police state and was marked by numerous human rights violations and severe repression. While the Assad government described itself as secular, various political scientists and observers noted that his regime exploited sectarian tensions in the country. Although Assad inherited the power structures and personality cult nurtured by his father, he lacked the loyalty received by his father and faced rising discontent against his rule. As a result, many people from his father's regime resigned or were purged, and the political inner circle was replaced by staunch loyalists from Alawite clans.

== Background ==
In 1988, Assad graduated from medical school and began working as an army doctor at Tishreen Military Hospital on the outskirts of Damascus. Four years later, he settled in London to start postgraduate training in ophthalmology at the Western Eye Hospital. He was described as a "geeky I.T. guy" during his time in London. Bashar had few political aspirations, and his father had been grooming Bashar's older brother Bassel as the future president. Bashar lacked interest in politics or the military unlike Bassel, his younger brother Maher, and second sister Bushra. The Assad children reportedly rarely saw their father, and Bashar later stated that he only entered his father's office once while he was president.

On 21 January 1994, Bassel was driving his luxury Mercedes at a high speed through fog to Damascus International Airport for a privately chartered flight to Frankfurt, Germany, on his way to a ski vacation in the Alps in the early hours of the morning, Bassel collided with a barrier and, not wearing a seatbelt, died instantly. Hafez Makhlouf was with him and was hospitalized with injuries after the accident; a chauffeur in the back seat was unhurt.

Soon after Bassel's death, Hafez al-Assad decided to make Bashar the new heir apparent. Over the next six and a half years, until his death in 2000, Hafez prepared Bashar for taking over power. General Bahjat Suleiman, an officer in the Defense Companies, was entrusted with overseeing preparations for a smooth transition, which were made on three levels. First, support was built up for Bashar in the military and security apparatus. Second, Bashar's image was established with the public. And lastly, Bashar was familiarised with the mechanisms of running the country.

To establish his credentials in the military, Bashar entered the military academy at Homs in 1994 and was propelled through the ranks to become a colonel of the elite Syrian Republican Guard in January 1999. To establish a power base for Bashar in the military, old divisional commanders were pushed into retirement, and new, young, Alawite officers with loyalties to him took their place.

In 1998, Bashar took charge of Syria's Lebanon file, which had since the 1970s been handled by Vice President Abdul Halim Khaddam, who had until then been a potential contender for president. By taking charge of Syrian affairs in Lebanon, Bashar was able to push Khaddam aside and establish his own power base in Lebanon. In the same year, after minor consultation with Lebanese politicians, Bashar installed Emile Lahoud, a loyal ally of his, as the President of Lebanon and pushed former Lebanese Prime Minister Rafic Hariri aside, by not placing his political weight behind his nomination as prime minister. To further weaken the old Syrian order in Lebanon, Bashar replaced the long-serving de facto Syrian High Commissioner of Lebanon, Ghazi Kanaan, with Rustum Ghazaleh.

Parallel to his military career, Bashar was engaged in public affairs. He was granted wide powers and became head of the bureau to receive complaints and appeals of citizens, and led a campaign against corruption. As a result of this campaign, many of Bashar's potential rivals for president were put on trial for corruption. Bashar also became the President of the Syrian Computer Society and helped to introduce the internet in Syria, which aided his image as a modernizer and reformer. Ba'athist loyalists in the party, military, and the Alawite sect were supportive of Bashar al-Assad, enabling him to become his father's successor.

== Early years ==
After the death of Hafez al-Assad on 10 June 2000, the Constitution of Syria was amended. The minimum age requirement for the presidency was lowered from 40 to 34, which was Bashar's age at the time. Assad contested as the only candidate and was subsequently confirmed president on 10 July 2000, with 97.29% support for his leadership. In line with his role as President of Syria, he was also appointed the commander-in-chief of the Syrian Armed Forces and Regional Secretary of the Ba'ath Party. A series of state elections were held every seven years which Assad won with overwhelming majority of votes. The elections are unanimously regarded by independent observers as a sham process and boycotted by the opposition. (Note: Sources:) (Note: Sources:) The last two elections – held in 2014 and 2021 – were conducted only in areas controlled by the Syrian government during the country's civil war and condemned by the United Nations.

== Syrian civil war ==
=== Downfall ===
On 27 November 2024, the Syrian opposition would launch an offensive against the Assad regime. On the 8 December the opposition groups captured Damascus. The Fall of Damascus would lead to the collapse of the Assad regime and the end of his presidency. Assad and his family then left the country to go to Moscow and were granted asylum by the Russian government.

== References and notes ==
=== Sources ===
- Blanford, Nicholas (2006). Killing Mr Lebanon: The Assassination of Rafik Hariri and Its Impact on the Middle East. I.B. Tauris. ISBN 978-1-84511-202-8.
- Leverett, Flynt L. (2005). Inheriting Syria: Bashar's Trial By Fire. Brookings Institution. ISBN 978-0-8157-5204-2.
- Ma'oz, Moshe; Ginat, Joseph; Winckler, Onn (1999). Modern Syria: From Ottoman Rule to Pivotal Role in the Middle East. Sussex Academic Press. ISBN 1-898723-83-4.
- Minahan, James (2002). Encyclopedia of the Stateless Nations: A–C. Greenwood Press. ISBN 978-0-313-32109-2.
- Tucker, Spencer C.; Roberts, Priscilla (2008). The Encyclopedia of the Arab-Israeli Conflict: A Political, Social, and Military History. ABC-CLIO. ISBN 978-1-85109-841-5.
- Zisser, Eyal (2007). Commanding Syria: Bashar Al-Asad And the First Years in Power. I.B. Tauris. ISBN 978-1-84511-153-3.

Syrian presidential administrations
Preceded by Hafez al-Assad	Bashar al-Assad	Succeeded by Ahmed al-Sharaa as De facto leader
