= Abdulfattah S. Mashat =

He also serving as Deputy minister in Hajj and Umrah ministry to Saudi Arabia

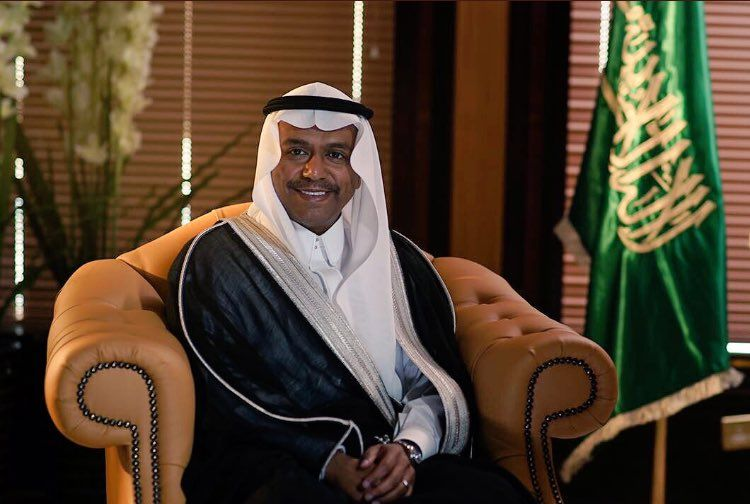

President of University of Jeddah
- Incumbent
- Assumed office July 2016
- Preceded by: No one

Vice-President for Development - King Abdulaziz University
- In office 2013–2016

Dean of Faculty of Computing & Information Technologies - King Abdulaziz University
- In office 2012–2013

Dean of Admissions - King Abdulaziz University
- In office 2006–2012

Director of Information Technology Center - King Abdulaziz University
- In office 2004–2006

Personal details
- Born: January 20, 1967 (age 59) Mecca, Kingdom of Saudi Arabia

Professor 'Abdulfattah bin Suleiman Al Mashat is the Rector of the newly established Jeddah University, Saudi Arabia since June 23, 2016. He was previously at King Abdulaziz University, holding the positions of Dean of Admission and Registration, director of the Center for Information Technology from 2004 to 2006, Dean of the Faculty of Computing and Information Technology from 2012 to 2016, both at King Abdulaziz University. ad then Vice Rector for Development (2013–2016).

== Early life ==
Al Mashat was born in Mecca in 1386 AH and descended from the well respected family of Bany Mashat Almonayfiyyen, which produced a number of Islamic clergymen like Shaikh Abdul Qadir Bin Ali Mashat Al-Munafy.
