= National Commission for Transitional Justice (Syria) =

Syrian governmental body

- الهيئة الوطنية للعدالة الانتقالية

Commission overview
- Formed: 17 May 2025; 17 months ago
- Jurisdiction: Syria
- Status: Active
- Headquarters: Damascus
- Commission executive: Abdulbaset Abdullatif, Head

The National Commission for Transitional Justice (Arabic: الهيئة الوطنية للعدالة الانتقالية, romanized: al-Hayʾah al-Waṭanīyah li-l-ʿAdālah al-Intiqālīyah) is a Syrian governmental body tasked with addressing past human rights violations, ensuring accountability, and supporting national reconciliation. The Commission was established in 2025 to contribute to justice and healing in the aftermath of the fall of the Ba'athist-led regime.

== Background ==
Following years of conflict and systemic human rights violations during the Syrian civil war, calls intensified for a national mechanism to address the legacies of past abuses. Transitional justice emerged as a key demand of victims' groups, civil society organizations, and international bodies seeking accountability and reconciliation.

== Establishment ==
The commission was established on 17 May 2025 by Decree No. 20 of the year 2025, issued by President Ahmed al-Sharaa. Abdulbaset Abdullatif was appointed as head of the commission and was given a deadline of 30 days from the date of the decree to form a working team and draft the internal regulations necessary for the functioning of the commission.

UN High Commissioner for Human Rights, Volker Türk, welcomed the formation of the commission and said that its formation is an integral step towards building a better future for all Syrians.

The European Union welcomed the formation of the commission, calling it an important step towards the comprehensive justice and truth which the Syrian people deserve.

== Mandate ==
The commission's primary responsibilities include:

- Uncovering the truth about serious violations committed under the former regime.
- Coordinating with relevant institutions to hold perpetrators accountable.
- Providing reparations to victims and their families.
- Promoting guarantees of non-repetition and supporting processes of national reconciliation.

A Syrian official told Reuters on 18 May that Ibrahim Huweija will be among those to stand trial.

== Legal status and structure ==
The commission operates with full legal personality and enjoys administrative and financial independence. It carries out its mandate across the entire territory of Syria.

== Criticism ==
The commission had been criticized for having its focus solely on atrocities committed by the Ba'athist regime, raising concerns about its exclusion of victims of other factions during the civil war, including the opposition forces. Critics also questioned whether the commission's mandate would expand to include violent acts committed by forces associated with the new authorities.

Human Rights Watch stated that "the Transitional Justice Commission's mandate, as laid out in the decree, is troublingly narrow and excludes many victims", and that "[the] decree limits its focus to crimes committed by the Assad government, excluding victims of abuses by non-state actors", adding that "recent atrocities and rising sectarian rhetoric underscore the urgent need for an inclusive transitional justice process—one for all Syrians, not just some".

== See also ==
- National Commission for the Missing (Syria)
- Transitional justice
- Human rights in Ba'athist Syria
- War crimes in the Syrian civil war
