= George Sabra =

President of the Syrian National Council

George Sabra جورج صبرة
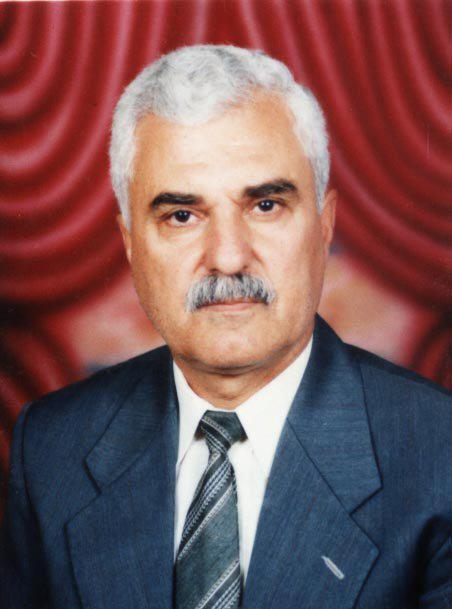

President of the Syrian National Coalition Acting
- In office 22 April 2013 – 6 July 2013
- Prime Minister: Ghassan Hitto
- Preceded by: Moaz al-Khatib
- Succeeded by: Ahmad Jarba

President of the Syrian National Council
- Incumbent
- Assumed office 10 June 2012
- Preceded by: Abdulbaset Sieda

Personal details
- Born: 11 July 1947 (age 78) Qatana, Syria
- Party: Syrian Democratic People's Party (since 1973)
- Other political affiliations: Syrian National Coalition (2012–2018)
- Education: Damascus University (BA); Indiana University Bloomington
- Occupation: Educator; politician; writer

George Sabra (Arabic: جورج صبرة, born 11 July 1947) is a Syrian educator and politician who has served as president of the Syrian National Council since 2012. A member of the Syrian Democratic People's Party, he previously served as acting president of the Syrian National Coalition from 22 April – 6 July 2013. He resigned from the National Coalition on 25 April 2018.

== Early life and education ==
Sabra was born to a Christian family in the city of Qatana in Rif Dimashq Governorate on 11 July 1947. He graduated with a geography degree from Damascus University in 1971 and a degree in educational technology systems from Indiana University in 1978. He since became a geography teacher, as well as a screenwriter. He is one of the writers for the Arabic version, Iftah Ya Simsim, of the children's show Sesame Street.

== Political career ==
Sabra has been politically active in the Syrian opposition movement since the 1970s. He joined the Syrian Communist Party (Political Bureau) in 1970 and was elected to its Central Committee in 1985. He was arrested in 1987 during one of many government crackdowns on the party and imprisoned for eight years. A few years after his release, in 2000, he was assigned to represent his party in the National Democratic Rally, a coalition of leftist parties that was originally formed in 1979, and he was subsequently elected to the rally's Central Committee. After the death of President Hafez al-Assad, his son, Bashar al-Assad allowed a brief toleration of opposition that was known as the Damascus Spring. Sabra was one of 250 people who signed the Damascus Declaration in 2005, which called for peaceful reform in Syria.

Sabra was arrested on 10 April 2011. He was arrested again on 20 July 2011 and was released two months later, having been held incommunicado. He left Syria in January 2012 to join the Paris-based Syrian National Council. Almost immediately he unsuccessfully challenged Burhan Ghalioun for the leadership of the SNC. He stood again in April, when he received 11 out of 40 votes against Ghalioun's 21 votes.

On 22 April 2013, president of the National Coalition for Syrian Revolutionary and Opposition Forces, Moaz al-Khatib resigned in protest of the lack of international aid to the Syrian opposition by the Friends of Syria Group. George Sabra was then appointed as Khatib's successor.

On 25 April 2018, George Sabra, along with former SNC vice president Suheir Atassi and president Khaled Khoja, resigned from the Syrian National Coalition. Sabra said that the SNC is "no longer devoted to the principles of the revolution and the goals of the Syrian] people".

On 7 June 2025, following the fall of the Assad regime, Sabra returned to Damascus.

Political offices
Preceded by Moaz al-Khatib	President of the National Coalition for Syrian Revolutionary and Opposition Forces; Acting; 2013	Succeeded by Ahmad Jarba
