= Syrian opposition =

Syrian groups opposed to the Assad regime during the Syrian revolution

- المعارضة السورية al-Muʿaraḍah as-Sūrīyyah
- The Syrian revolution flag, used by opponents to Ba'athist rule
- Other name: Syrian revolutionaries; Syrian rebels
- Dates active: 15 March 2011 – 8 December 2024 (merged with the Syrian Armed Forces)
- Country: States: Syrian Arab Republic (caretaker and transitional governments); Quasi-states: Syrian Interim Government; Syrian Salvation Government
- Headquarters: List: Istanbul (Syrian National Council and Syrian National Coalition, from 2012); Azaz (Syrian Interim Government and Syrian National Army, from 2016); Idlib (Syrian Salvation Government and Hay'at Tahrir al-Sham, from 2017); Al-Tanf (Syrian Free Army, from 2016); Daraa (Southern Operations Room); Amman (Southern Front, from 2014 to 2018); Mare' (Mare' Operations Room); Hawar Kilis (Hawar Kilis Operations Room); Babisqa (Ahrar al-Sham)
- Ideology: Anti–Assadism; Factions: Regionalism; Democracy; Syrian nationalism; Religious nationalism; Secular nationalism; Sunni Islamism; Islamic fundamentalism; Wahhabism; Salafism; Secularism
- Political position: Big tent

The Syrian opposition was an umbrella term for the Syrian revolutionary organizations that opposed Bashar al-Assad's Ba'athist regime during the Syrian revolution and the Syrian civil war. The opposition factions in Syria became active as grassroots movements during the mass demonstrations against the Ba'athist regime. The Free Syrian Army (FSA) was the most prominent armed revolutionary group in the initial stages of the war; but it later declined and became decentralized by 2015. By 2021, Hay'at Tahrir al-Sham (HTS) had become the strongest faction within the armed forces of the Syrian opposition.

In July 2011, as the situation turned into a civil war, defectors from the Syrian Arab Armed Forces formed the Free Syrian Army. In August 2011, dissident groups operating from abroad formed a coalition called the Syrian National Council. A broader organization, the Syrian National Coalition (SNC), was formed in November 2012. Although the groups based abroad established contact with those in Syria, the Syrian opposition suffered during the whole conflict from infighting and a lack of unified leadership, as well as lack of foreign aid as the war became deadlocked.

In 2013, the Syrian National Coalition formed the Syrian Interim Government (SIG), which operated first as a government-in-exile and, from 2015, in certain zones of Syria. From 2016, the SIG was present in the Turkish-occupied zones, while the SNC operated from Istanbul. In 2017, the Islamist group Hay'at Tahrir al-Sham (HTS), unaffiliated to the SNC, formed the Syrian Salvation Government (SSG) in the areas it controlled. Both opposition governments operated as quasi-states. Rebel armed forces during the civil war have included the Turkish-backed Syrian National Army, affiliated to the SIG, the Syrian Liberation Front, the National Front for Liberation, the Southern Front, the Southern Operations Room, and the American-backed Syrian Free Army (previously known as the Revolutionary Commando Army).

On 27 November 2024, Hay'at Tahrir al-Sham and a coalition of Syrian armed opposition groups launched 2024 Syrian opposition offensives which led to the fall of the Assad regime after 11 days of fighting. The HTS-led Syrian Salvation Government became the foundation for the Syrian transitional government. During the Syrian Revolution Victory Conference, held in Damascus on 29 January 2025, the dissolution of several armed revolutionary factions and their merger into the newly overhauled Syrian Armed Forces was officially announced. At the event, the Syrian General Command appointed former HTS general commander Ahmed al-Sharaa as president of Syria for the transitional phase.

== Background ==
Syria has been an independent republic since 1946 after the expulsion of French forces. For decades, the country was partially stable with a series of coups until the Ba'ath Party seized power in Syria in 1963 after a coup d'état. In 1970, Hafez al-Assad seized power, beginning the rule of the Assad family. Syria was under emergency law from the time of the 1963 Syrian coup d'état until 21 April 2011, when it was rescinded by Bashar al-Assad, Hafez's eldest surviving son and his successor as president of Syria.

The rule of Assad dynasty was marked by heavy repression of secular opposition factions such as the Arab nationalist Nasserists and liberal democrats. The largest organised resistance to the Ba'athist rule has been the Syrian Muslim Brotherhood, which successfully capitalised on the widespread Sunni resentment against the Alawite hegemony. An Islamist uprising developed in Syria from 1976. In response, the Assad regime introduced Law No. 49 in 1980 which banned the movement and instituted death penalty of anyone accused of membership in the Brotherhood. The Syrian Muslim Brotherhood rose as the most powerful opposition force in Syria until it was brutally crushed in 1982.

Prior to the civil war that started in 2011, "opposition" (Arabic: المعارضة, romanized: al-muʕāraḍat) referred to traditional political actors such as political exiles, the public platforms that had emerged during the Damascus Spring and those who later formed the Damascus Declaration alliance; that is, groups and individuals with a history of dissidence against the Syrian state.

== History ==
As the revolutionary wave commonly referred to as the Arab Spring began to take shape in early 2011, Syrian protesters began consolidating opposition councils. Spontaneous protests became more planned and organized. The uprising, from March 2011 until the start of August 2011, was characterized by a consensus for nonviolent struggle among the participants. The opposition councils inside the country became known as the Local Coordination Committees of Syria.

The Istanbul Meeting for Syria, the first convention of the Syrian opposition, took place on 26 April 2011, during the early phase of the civil uprising. There followed the Antalya Conference for Change in Syria or Antalya Opposition Conference, a three-day conference of representatives of the Syrian opposition held from 31 May until 3 June 2011 in Antalya, Turkey. Organized by Ammar al-Qurabi's National Organization for Human Rights in Syria and financed by the wealthy Damascene Sanqar family, it led to a final statement refusing compromise or reform solutions, and to the election of a 31-member leadership.

After the Antalya conference, a follow-up meeting took place two days later in Brussels, then another gathering in Paris that was addressed by Bernard-Henri Lévy, a French author who was involved at the same time in support for the Libyan uprising. It took a number of further meetings in Istanbul and Doha before yet another meeting on 23 August 2011 in Istanbul set up a permanent transitional council in form of the Syrian National Council, which received significant international support and recognition as a partner for dialogue. The Syrian National Council was recognized or supported in some capacity by at least 17 member states of the United Nations, with three of those (France, the United Kingdom, and the United States) being permanent members of the Security Council.

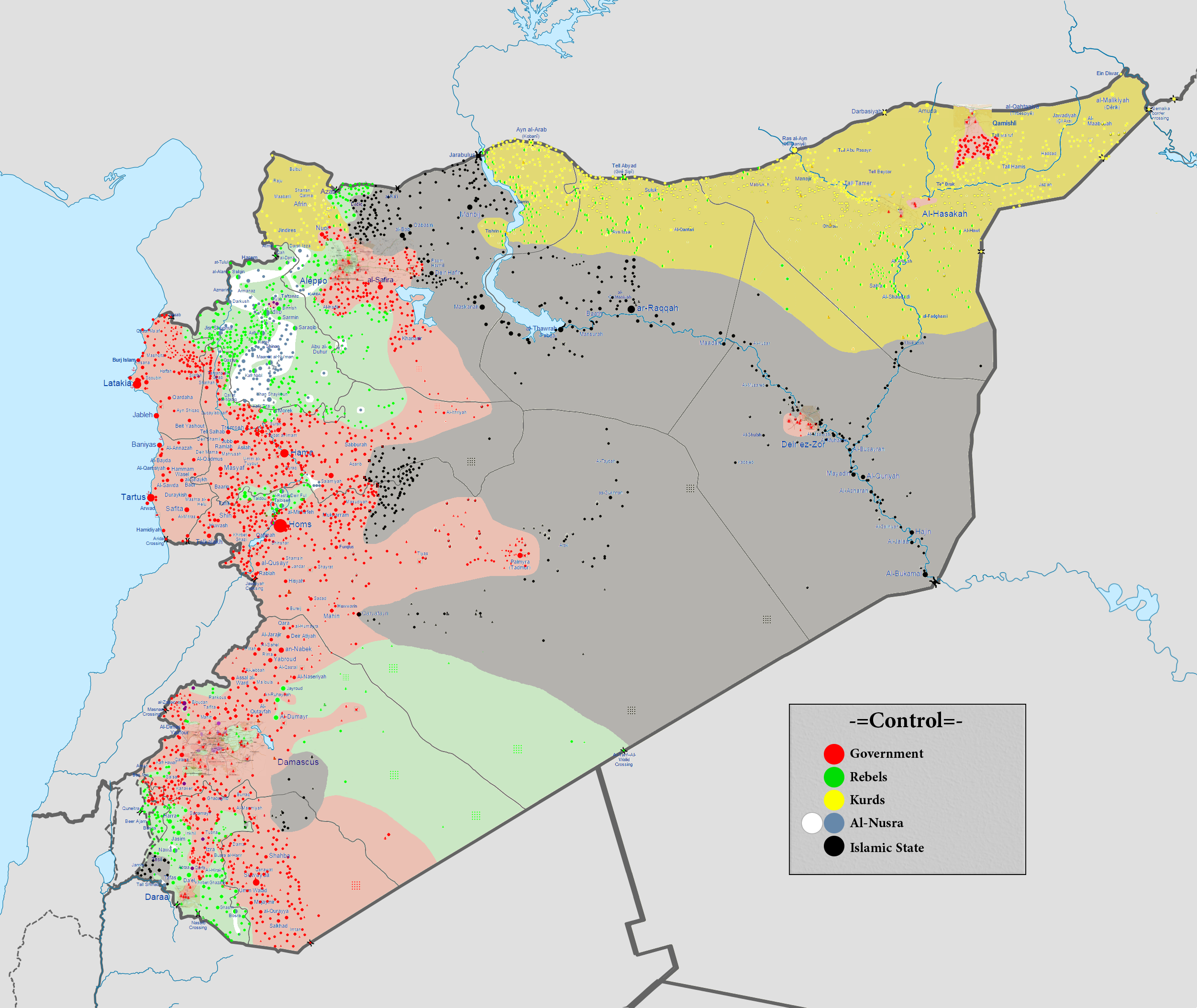
Opposition control (in green and white; Rojava control in yellow; Islamic State control in grey; Assad regime control in pink) in April 2016.

The National Coalition of Syrian Revolutionary and Opposition Forces (commonly known as the Syrian National Coalition), a broader umbrella organization formed in November 2012, gained recognition as the "legitimate representative of the Syrian people" by the Cooperation Council for the Arab States of the Gulf (CCASG) and as a "representative of aspirations of Syrian people" by the Arab League. The Friends of Syria Group transferred its recognition from the Syrian National Council to the Syrian National Coalition. The Syrian National Coalition subsequently took the seat of Syria in the Arab League, with the representative of Bashar Al-Assad's government suspended that year. The Syrian National Council, initially a part of the Syrian National Coalition, withdrew on 20 January 2014 in protest at the decision of the coalition to attend the Geneva talks. Despite tensions, the Syrian National Council retained a degree of ties with the Syrian National Coalition.

A July 2015 ORB International poll of 1,365 adults across all of Syria's 14 governorates found that about 26 percent of the population supported the Syrian opposition (41 percent in the areas it controlled), compared to 47 percent who supported the Ba'athist government (73 percent in the areas it controlled), 35 percent who supported the Al-Nusra Front (58 percent in the areas it controlled), and 22 percent who supported the Islamic State (74 percent in the areas it controlled). A March 2018 ORB International Poll with a similar method and sample size found that support had changed to 40% Syrian government, 40% Syrian opposition (in general), 15% Syrian Democratic Forces, 10% al-Nusra Front, and 4% Islamic State (crossover may exist between supporters of factions).

Opposition control in August 2024.

While rebel forces initially made significant advances against government forces, the Iranian and Russian interventions in support of the Assad regime shifted the balance of the conflict. Syrian rebel forces were also under attack by the Islamic State as the conflict became multi-sided. Ba'athist forces gradually recaptured most rebel strongholds except the Idlib Governorate and Turkish-occupied zones. A major battle between rebel groups and government forces took place in Aleppo, which was recaptured by the regime in late 2016. In the meantime, Syrian opposition groups, including the Syrian National Coalition, tried to negotiate with the regime as part of a peace process that failed to produce results. The Syrian National Coalition remained fraught with internal conflict and leadership problems. Qatar and Saudi Arabia competed for influence over it. Eventually, the Istanbul-based SNC became essentially a platform for Turkish influence and lost much of its international clout.

In late 2016, the Syrian Interim Government relocated its headquarters to the city of Azaz in North Syria and began to execute some authority in the area. From 2017, the opposition government in the Idlib Governorate was challenged by the rival Syrian Salvation Government, backed by the Islamist faction Hayat Tahrir al-Sham (HTS). Moreover, in the areas it nominally controlled, the SIG remained wholly dependent on Turkish support. As of 2022, the Syrian opposition had to deal with Turkey's willingness to normalize relations with the Assad regime. This, together with Turkey's local interference and its handling of the Syrian refugee situation, led in July 2024 to anti-Turkish riots in opposition-held areas.

In January 2025, opposition groups announced their disbandment during the Syrian Revolution Victory Conference, with areas in green being under their control at the time.

In late 2024, opposition forces led a series of lightning offensives, routing Ba'athist forces and taking Damascus on December 8. The regime collapsed as Bashar al-Assad fled to Moscow. On December 10, Mohammed al-Bashir, previously head of the Syrian Salvation Government, became prime minister of the Syrian transitional government that replaced both the SSG and the last Ba'athist government in Damascus. With one exception, all ministers in the transitional government previously held similar portfolios in the SSG. Ahmed al-Sharaa, leader of HTS, became regarded as Syria's de facto head of state. In January 2025, opposition groups held the Syrian Revolution Victory Conference, where the Syrian General Command formally announced al-Sharaa as the interim president of Syria. Additionally, opposition groups agreed to disband themselves and integrate into the newly reformed Syrian Armed Forces.

== Political groups ==
The Syrian opposition never had a definitive political structure. In December 2015, members of the Syrian opposition convened in Riyadh, Saudi Arabia: 34 groups attended the convention, which aimed to produce a unified delegation for negotiations with the Syrian government. Notable groups present included:

- the National Coalition of Syrian Revolutionary and Opposition Forces, which supported the implementation of the 2012 Geneva Communique, which calls for the establishment of a transitional governing body in Syria
- the National Coordination Committee for Democratic Change, which called for negotiations on a peaceful transition
- armed groups:
  - Jaysh al-Islam
  - Ahrar al-Sham
  - the Southern Front

The December 2015 convention notably did not include:

- the Kurdish PYD party and its affiliates
- Salafi armed groups such as Al-Nusra Front.

=== National Coalition of Syrian Revolutionary and Opposition Forces ===
Official logo of the National Coalition of Syrian Revolutionary and Opposition Forces

The National Coalition of Syrian Revolutionary and Opposition Forces, commonly known as the Syrian National Coalition (SNC), is a coalition of opposition groups and individuals, mostly exilic, who support the Syrian revolutionary side and oppose the Assad government ruling Syria. It formed on 11 November 2012 at a conference of opposition groups and individuals held in Doha, Qatar. It has relations with other opposition organizations such as the Syrian National Council, the previous iteration of an exilic political body attempting to represent the grassroots movement; the union of the two was planned, but has failed to realize. Moderate Islamic preacher Moaz al-Khatib, who had protested on the Syrian street in the early nonviolent phase of the uprising, served a term as the president of the coalition, but soon resigned his post, frustrated with the gap between the body and the grassroots of the uprising inside Syria. Riad Seif and Suheir Atassi, both of whom had also protested on the street in Syria early in the uprising, were elected as vice presidents. Mustafa Sabbagh is the coalition's secretary-general.

Notable members of the Coalition include:

- the Assyrian Democratic Organization: a party representing the Assyrian minority and long repressed by the Assad government, it has participated in opposition structures since the beginning of the conflict. Abdul-Ahad Astepho is a member of the SNC.
- The Syrian Turkmen Assembly.

=== Syrian National Council ===
The Syrian National Council (SNC), sometimes known as the Syrian National Transitional Council or the National Council of Syria, is a Syrian opposition coalition based in Istanbul (Turkey) that was formed in August 2011 during the Syrian civil uprising against the government of Bashar al-Assad.

Initially, the council denied seeking to play the role of a government in exile, but this changed a few months later when violence in Syria intensified. The Syrian National Council seeks the end of Bashar al-Assad's rule and the establishment of a modern, civil, democratic state. The SNC National Charter lists human rights, judicial independence, press freedom, democracy and political pluralism as its guiding principles.

In November 2012, the Council agreed to unite with several other opposition groups to form the National Coalition of Syrian Revolutionary and Opposition Forces, with the SNC having 22 out of 60 seats. The Council withdrew from the Coalition on 20 January 2014 in protest at the decision of the Coalition to attend talks in Geneva.

Notable members of the Council include:

- the Syrian Democratic People's Party, a socialist party which played a "key role" in forming the SNC. The Party's leader George Sabra (a secularist born into a Christian family) is the official spokesman of the SNC, and also ran for chairman.
- the Supreme Council of the Syrian Revolution, a Syrian opposition group supporting the overthrow of Bashar al-Assad's government. It grants local opposition groups representation in its national organization.
- the Syrian Democratic Turkmen Movement: An opposition party, constituted in Istanbul on 21 March 2012, of Syrian Turkmens. Ziyad Hasan leads the Syrian Democratic Turkmen Movement.

=== National Coordination Committee for Democratic Change ===
The National Coordination Committee for Democratic Change (NCC), or the National Coordination Body for Democratic Change (NCB), is a Syrian bloc chaired by Hassan Abdel Azim and consisting of 13 left-wing political parties and "independent political and youth activists". Reuters has defined the committee as the internal opposition's main umbrella group. The NCC initially had several Kurdish political parties as members, but all except for the Democratic Union Party left in October 2011 to join the Kurdish National Council. The NCC proved controversial among other opposition groups, with activists rejecting its calls for dialogue with Bashar al-Assad and accusing it of being a "front organization" for the Ba'athist regime.

The NCC generally has poor relationships with other Syrian political opposition groups. The Syrian Revolution General Commission, the Local Coordination Committees of Syria, and the Supreme Council of the Syrian Revolution oppose the NCC calls to dialogue with the Syrian government. In September 2012 the Syrian National Council (SNC) reaffirmed that despite broadening its membership, it would not join with "currents close to [the] NCC". Despite the NCC recognizing the Free Syrian Army (FSA) on 23 September 2012, the FSA has dismissed the NCC as an extension of the government, stating that "this opposition is just the other face of the same coin".

Notable former members of the Committee have included:

- the Syriac Union Party, a party representing the interests of Syriac Christians and affiliated with the Syriac Union Party in Lebanon (itself part of the anti-Assad March 14 Alliance). It has taken part in numerous opposition demonstrations, including storming the Syrian embassy in Stockholm in August 2012. It later left the NCC and joined the Syrian Democratic Council in late 2015.
- the Democratic Union Party, the main Kurdish party in Syria and the dominant party in the de facto Democratic Federation of Northern Syria. It later left the NCC and joined the Syrian Democratic Council in late 2015.

=== Syrian Democratic Council ===
The Syrian Democratic Council was established on 10 December 2015 in al-Malikiyah. It was co-founded by prominent human rights activist Haytham Manna and was intended as the political wing of the Syrian Democratic Forces. The council includes more than a dozen blocs and coalitions that support federalism in Syria, including the Movement for a Democratic Society, the Kurdish National Alliance in Syria, the Law–Citizenship–Rights Movement, and since September 2016 the Syria's Tomorrow Movement. The last group is led by former National Coalition president and Syrian National Council Ahmad Jarba. In August 2016 the SDC opened a public office in al-Hasakah.

The Syrian Democratic Council is considered an "alternative opposition" bloc. Its leaders included former NCC members such as Riad Darar, a "key figure" in the Syrian opposition, and Haytham Manna, who resigned from the SDC in March 2016 in protest of its announcement of the Northern Syria Federation. The SDC was rejected by some other opposition groups due to its system of federalism.

The Syrian Democratic Council was invited to participate in the international Geneva III peace talks on Syria in March 2016. However, it rejected the invitations because no representatives of the Movement for a Democratic Society, led by the Democratic Union Party, were invited.

=== Other groups affiliated with the Syrian opposition ===
- Muslim Brotherhood: Islamist party founded in 1930. The brotherhood was behind the Islamic uprising in Syria between 1976 until 1982. The party is banned in Syria and membership became a capital offence in 1980. The Muslim Brotherhood has issued statements of support for the Syrian uprising. Other sources have described the group as having "risen from the ashes", "resurrected itself" to be a dominant force in the uprising. The Syrian Muslim Brotherhood has constantly lost influence with militants on the ground, who have defected from the Muslim Brotherhood affiliated Shields of the Revolution Council to the Islamic Front.
- Coalition of Secular and Democratic Syrians: a grouping of Syrian secular and democratic opposition members, which came about through the union of a dozen Muslim and Christian, Arab and Kurd parties, who called the minorities of Syria to support the fight against the government of Bashar al-Assad. This group, chaired by Randa Kassis, has also called for military intervention in Syria, under the form of a no-fly zone similar to that of Kosovo, with a safe zone and cities. Kassis, who chaired talks as part of the Astana Platform, has expressed support for the Russian intervention in Syria. Kassis' initiatives proved controversial among other members of the opposition, who considered them to be part of an "acceptable" opposition backed by Russia.
- Syrian Turkmen Assembly: An assembly of Syrian Turkmens, formed in 2012, which constitutes a coalition of Turkmen parties and groups in Syria. It is against the partition of Syria after the collapse of Baath government. The common decision of Syrian Turkmen Assembly is: "Regardless of any ethnic or religious identity, a future in which everybody can be able to live commonly under the identity of Syrian is targeted in the future of Syria." In 2019, Abdurrahman Mustafa, president of the Syrian Turkmen Assembly, became the president of the Turkish-supported Syrian Interim Government. He also chaired the Syrian National Coalition between 2018 and 2019.
  - Syrian Turkmen National Bloc: An opposition party of Syrian Turkmens, which was founded in February 2012. The chairman of the political party is Yusuf Molla.
- Local Coordination Committees of Syria: Network of local protest groups that organise and report on protests as part of the Syrian civil war, founded in 2011. As of August 2011, the network supported civil disobedience and opposed local armed resistance and international military intervention as methods of opposing the Syrian government. Key people are activists Razan Zaitouneh and Suhair al-Atassi.
- Syrian National Democratic Council: formed in Paris on 13 November 2011 during the Syrian civil war by Rifaat al-Assad, uncle of Bashar al-Assad. Rifaat al-Assad has expressed the wish to replace Bashar al-Assad with the authoritarian state apparatus intact, and to guarantee the safety of government members, while also making vague allusions to a "transition". Rifaat has his own political organisation, the United National Democratic Rally.
- Syrian Revolution General Commission: Syrian coalition of 40 Syrian opposition groups to unite their efforts during the Syrian civil war that was announced on 19 August 2011 in Istanbul.

=== Other opposition groups ===
- The Democratic National Assembly: Political gathering of political parties and organizations, citizens independent of parties, and public figures. It was established in 1979 and consists of five parties: the Democratic Arab Socialists Union, the Syrian Democratic People's Party, the Arab Revolutionary Workers' Party, the Arab Socialists Movement, and the Arab Socialist Democratic Ba'ath Party. In 2006, the Communist Labour Party joined this coalition, and it was one of the participants in the "Damascus Spring".
- The National Salvation Front in Syria: It was founded in 2005 by Abdul Halim Khaddam, who is the former vice-president, along with a number of opposition figures abroad. He was previously one of the symbols of the regime during the days of former President Hafez al-Assad.
- Ahrar - The Syrian Liberal Party: This party was founded in February 2000. It is a social liberal political party. It is headed by Mrs. Yasmine Merhi and her deputy, Mr. Khaled al-Bitar. It is the first opposition political party headed by a Syrian woman.

=== Opposition within the People's Assembly ===
Several political parties and organizations opposing the Ba'athist-led regime existed inside Syria, and had been briefly represented in the People's Assembly, serving as the official political opposition to the Ba'athist-led National Progressive Front. Among these parties are included:

- The Popular Front for Change and Liberation: The front was founded in August 2011 in Damascus. It established in its national charter the launch of public freedoms, the start of a national dialogue, and work on drafting a new constitution. The Front participated in the 2012 elections and achieving 5 seats in the People's Assembly. Among the different parties united in the Front are:
  - Syrian Social Nationalist Party – Intifada Wing: A splinter group, founded in 1957, of the Syrian Social Nationalist Party. This ideology was more attractive to minorities in that region, at the expense of Arab nationalism and Islamic ideologies. The party took part to the parliamentary opposition but supported in 2014 Assad's reelection.
  - Popular Will Party: Founded on August 21, 2012 by Qadri Jamil. It is a communist-associated Syrian political party that affirms the interests of the working class and other hard-working Syrians. They also fight for the recognition of them as a representative of these interests.

The Popular Front for Change and Liberation decided to boycott the 2016 elections because the regime had not upheld its promise to amend to the constitution.

== Governance ==
=== Syrian Interim Government ===
At a conference held in Istanbul on 19 March 2013 members of the National Coalition elected Ghassan Hitto as prime minister of an interim government for Syria, the Syrian Interim Government (SIG). Hitto has announced that a technical government will be formed which will be led by between 10 and 12 ministers, with the Free Syrian Army choosing the Minister of Defense. The SIG is based in Turkey. It has been the primary civilian authority throughout most of opposition-held Syria. Its system of administrative local councils operate services such as schools and hospitals in these areas, as well as the Free Aleppo University. By late 2017, it presided over 12 provincial councils and over 400 elected local councils. It also operates a major border crossing between Syria and Turkey, which generates an estimated $1 million revenue each month. It is internationally recognized by the European Union and the United States, among others. It maintains diplomatic ties with some non-FSA rebel groups, such as Ahrar al-Sham, but has been in conflict with the more hardline Hay'at Tahrir al-Sham, which is one of the largest armed groups in Idlib Governorate.

=== Syrian Salvation Government ===
The Syrian Salvation Government was an alternative government of the Syrian opposition seated within Idlib Governorate, which was formed by the General Syrian Conference in September 2017. The domestic group has appointed Mohammed al-Sheikh as head of the Government with 11 more ministers for Interior, Justice, Endowment, Higher Education, Education, Health, Agriculture, Economy, Social Affairs and Displaced, Housing and Reconstruction and Local Administration and Services. Al-Sheikh, in a press conference held at the Bab al-Hawa Border Crossing has also announced the formation of four commissions: Inspection Authority, Prisoners and missing Affairs, Planning and Statistics Authority, and the Union of Trade Unions. The founder of the Free Syrian Army, Col. Riad al-Asaad, was appointed as deputy prime minister for military affairs. The SSG is associated with Hay'at Tahrir al-Sham (HTS) and not recognised by the rest of the opposition, which is in conflict with HTS.

There was a sharp ideological divide between the two competing opposition civil authorities: The SIG espouses secular, moderate values and regularly participated in international peace talks; the SSG enforced a strict interpretation of Islamic law and stringently rejected talks with the Syrian regime.

After the fall of the Assad regime, the SSG was replaced by the Syrian transitional government, installed in Damascus.

=== Autonomous Administration of North and East Syria ===
The Democratic Autonomous Administration of North and East Syria was an area that extended across northeastern Syria and included parts of the governorates of Al-Hasakah, Al-Raqqa, Aleppo, and Deir ez-Zor. The capital of the area was Ain Issa, a town belonging to the Al-Raqqa governorate. The Administration was headed by Siham Qaryo and Farid Atti as joint heads. In January 2014, a number of parties, social actors, and civil institutions announced the formation of the Autonomous Administration to fill the power vacuum that existed at that time in the Syrian Kurdish regions. Although its authority had not been recognized or authorized by any formal agreement involving the sovereign Syrian state or any international power, its presence in the region and its ability to wield power were unchallenged.

== Territorial control ==
Territorial control following the 2024 Syrian opposition offensives and the fall of the Assad regime in December.

Following the fall of the Assad regime, various Syrian opposition groups have a notable presence in Syria. The primary group is Hay'at Tahrir al-Sham, which led the 2024 Syrian opposition offensives. Their forces controlled most major cities in Syria, including Aleppo, Hama, Homs, and Damascus. Other groups include the Syrian National Army which controlled significant areas in Northern Syria, along with the Southern Operations Room which is present in Southern Syria. Besides that, the Syrian Democratic Forces also maintained a presence in Northeastern Syria in several governorates, including Hasakah, Raqqa, Aleppo, and Deir ez-Zor.

=== Interim Government ===
In April 2015, after the Second Battle of Idlib, the interim seat of the Syrian Interim Government was proposed to be Idlib, in the Idlib Governorate. However, this move was rejected by the al-Nusra Front and Ahrar al-Sham-led Army of Conquest, which between them controlled Idlib. According to the Syrian National Coalition, in 2017 there were 404 opposition-aligned local councils operating in villages, towns, and cities controlled by rebel forces. In 2016, the Syrian Interim Government became established within the Turkish-controlled areas.

=== Salvation Government ===
The Salvation Government extends authority in Idlib, Aleppo, Hama, Homs, and the coastal regions of Northwestern Syria.

=== Al-Tanf Garrison ===
The Al-Tanf Garrison controls the city of Palmyra and surrounding areas near the Al-Tanf military base.

=== Southern Front ===
The Southern Front controls areas on the border with Jordan and the Golan Heights, including all of the Daraa Governorate and part of the Quneitra Governorate.

== Recognition and foreign relations ==
During the civil war, the opposition worked to establish diplomatic relations with various countries and international organizations. Turkey recognized the Syrian opposition as the genuine Syrian Arab Republic and hosted several of its institutions on its territory. The Qatari government has also been a key ally in supporting the Syrian opposition's efforts to establish a new government. The Syrian National Coalition was granted Syria's seat in the Arab League in 2013, but the next year it was decided that the seat would remain vacant until the opposition stabilized its institutions. SNC representatives were allowed to participate in the Arab League's meetings on an exceptional basis. France was one of the first Western countries to recognize the Syrian opposition and has maintained its support for the transitional government. The European Union recognized the Syrian National Coalition as the legitimate representative of the Syrian people in 2012.

During the civil war, the opposition as a whole was characterised as "terrorist" by Iran, Russia and Syria.

In December 2024, the Afghan Taliban Administration congratulated Hay’at Tahrir al-Sham on its victory over the Assad regime.

== Military forces ==
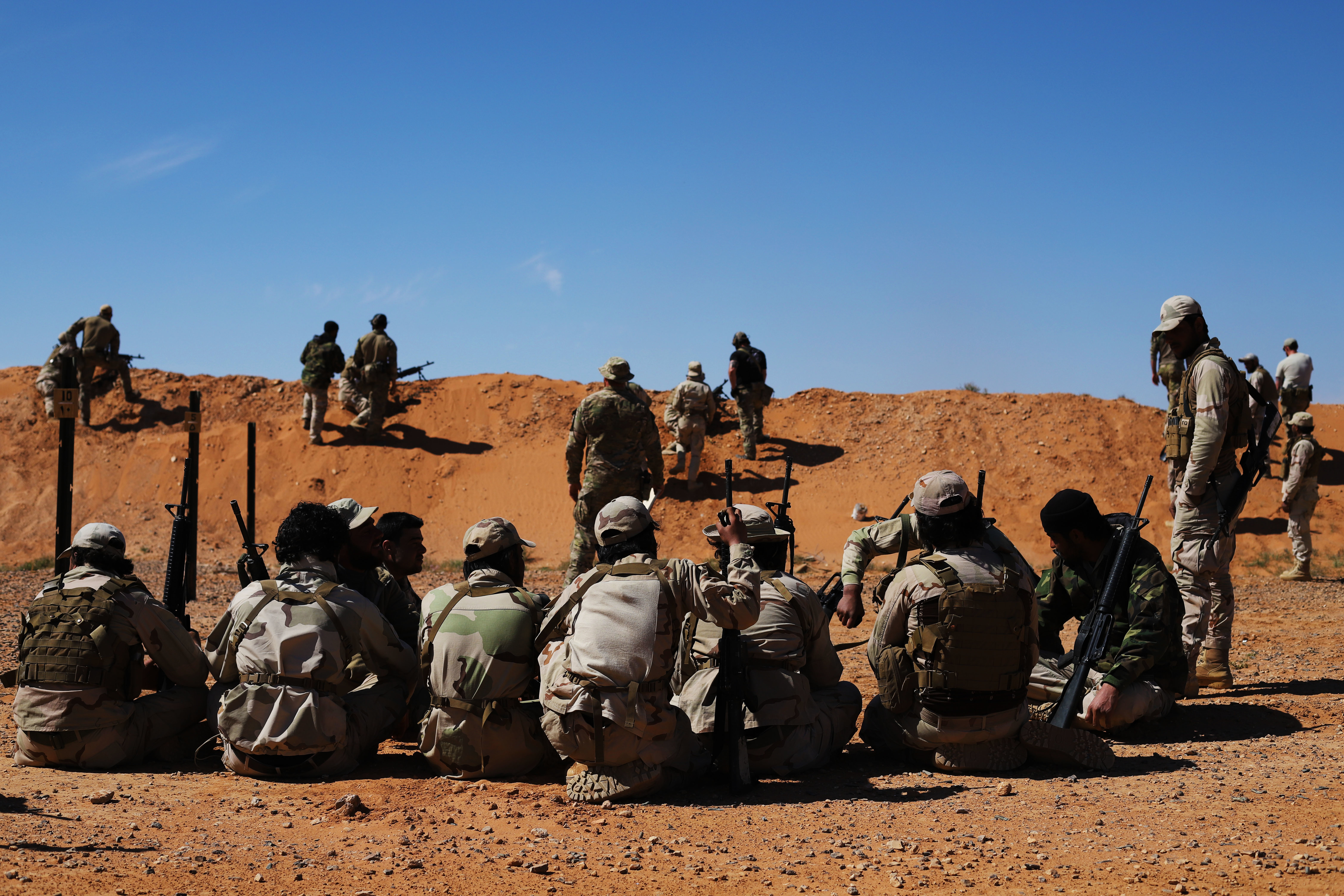
Revolutionary Commando Army fighters during M240B machine gun training with U.S. Army Special Forces, al-Tanf, 4 March 2020

Initially, the Free Syrian Army was perceived as the ultimate military force of the Syrian Opposition, but with the collapse of many FSA factions and emergence of powerful Islamist groups, it became clear to the opposition that only a cooperation of secular military forces and moderate Islamists could form a sufficient coalition to battle both the Syrian Government forces and radical Jihadists such as ISIL and in some cases al-Nusra Front.

In 2014, the military forces associated with the Syrian Opposition were defined by the Syrian Revolutionary Command Council, which in turn was mainly relying on the Free Syrian Army (with links to Syrian National Coalition) and the Islamic Front. Members of the Syrian Revolutionary Command Council:

- Free Syrian Army: Paramilitary that has been active during the Syrian civil war. Composed mainly of defected Syrian Armed Forces personnel, its formation was announced on 29 July 2011 in a video released on the Internet by a uniformed group of deserters from the Syrian military who called upon members of the Syrian army to defect and join them. The leader of the group, who identified himself as Colonel Riad al-Asaad, announced that the Free Syrian Army would work with demonstrators to bring down the system, and declared that all security forces attacking civilians are justified targets. It has also been reported that many former Syrian Consulates are trying to band together a Free Syrian Navy from fishermen and defectors to secure the coast.
  - Syrian Turkmen Brigades: An armed opposition structure of Syrian Turkmens fighting against Syrian Armed Forces. It is also the military wing of Syrian Turkmen Assembly. It is led by Colonel Muhammad Awad and Ali Basher.
  - Syrian Free Army – Free Syrian Army unit trained by, and politically very close to, the United States. It remains the last unit in the Al-Tanf area, and functions as the de facto opposition government there.
- Islamic Front: An Islamist rebel group formed in November 2013 and led by Ahrar al-Sham. It was always a loose alliance and was defunct by 2015.
- Syrian Democratic Forces (SDF): An alliance that brings together many multi-ethnic and multi-religious militias, and is controlled by the forces affiliated with the Kurdish Democratic Union Party represented by the People's Protection Units and the Women's Protection Units. These forces are characterized by a less hostile attitude towards the Syrian regime than other opposition brigades. They function de facto as the armed forces of the Autonomous Administration of North and East Syria and are also recognized as such by the Administration.

Other rebel fighting forces:

- Syrian Islamic Front: An Insurgent umbrella organisation of Salafist Rebels that were led by Ahrar al-Sham, It Merged with the Syrian Islamic Liberation Front to the form the Islamic Front.
- Syrian Islamic Liberation Front: The major rebel fighting coalition independent of the FSA in the period 2012–2013, including the moderate Islamist groups Suqour al-Sham, Al-Tawhid Brigade and Jaysh al-Islam, deploying up to half the opposition's fighting force. Its main members joined the Islamic Front in 2013.
- Turkish-backed Free Syrian Army: A coalition of mainly Arab and Turkmen opposition fighters in Northern Syria, armed and backed by Turkey since May 2017, partially reorganized as the Syrian National Army in December 2017.
- National Front for Liberation: A coalition of FSA groups in Idlib and NW Syria formed in early 2018 and backed by Turkey.
- Syrian Liberation Front: An Islamist rebel group formed in early 2018 and including Ahrar al-Sham and the Nour al-Din al-Zenki Movement, the largest rebel fighting groups in NW Syria.

== List of opposition figures ==
- Abdulrazak Eid, Syrian writer and thinker, participated in finding the Committees for the Civil Society in Syria, wrote the first draft of the Statement of 1000, and participated in drafting the Damascus Declaration.
- Ammar Abdulhamid, leading Human-Rights Advocate, Founder of Tharwa Foundation, first Syrian to testify in front of American Congress 2006/2008, briefed Presidents of the United States, and called for Syrian Revolution in 2006.
- Aref Dalilah, prominent economist, professor, former member of Syrian Parliament and a member of the Damascus Declaration
- Burhan Ghalioun, former head of the SNC
- Riad al-Asaad, leader of the Free Syrian Army
- Riad Seif, former head of the Forum for National Dialogue
- Riyad al-Turk, ex-communist politician and liberal democrat
- Haitham al-Maleh, leading human rights activist and former judge
- Anwar al-Bunni, human rights lawyer, democracy activist and political prisoner
- Maher Arar, Syrian-Canadian human rights activist
- Marwan Habash, politician, writer and Minister of Industry pre-Assad
- Michel Kilo, Christian writer and human rights activist, who has been called "one of Syria's leading opposition thinkers"
- Kamal al-Labwani, doctor and artist, considered one of the most prominent members of the Syrian opposition movement
- Tal al-Mallohi, blogger from Homs and world's youngest prisoner of conscience
- Yassin al-Haj Saleh, writer and political dissident
- Ahmed al-Sharaa, leader of Hay'at Tahrir al-Sham, de facto leader of Syria from December 2024 to January 2025 after Assad's downfall, president of Syria since 2025
- Fares Tammo, son of assassinated Kurdish politician Mashaal Tammo
- Bassma Kodmani, an academic and former spokesperson of the SNC
- Radwan Ziadeh, co-spokesperson for the SNC
- Randa Kassis, president of the Coalition of Secular and Democratic Syrians
- Fadwa Suleiman, leader of protests in Homs
- Razan Ghazzawi, prominent blogger
- Samar Yazbek, Syrian author and journalist. She was awarded the 2012 PEN Pinter International Writer of Courage Award for her book, A Woman in the Crossfire: Diaries of the Syrian Revolution. She fled Syria in 2011 but continues to be an outspoken critic of the al-Assad government from abroad, from Europe and the US.
- Razan Zaitouneh, leader in the Local Coordination Committees of Syria and the 2011 Sakharov Prize winner
- Muhammad al-Yaqoubi, Sunni Muslim scholar and preacher, currently residing in exile in Morocco
- Hussam Awak, ex-Syrian Air Force and Air Force Intelligence Directorate officer who later joined the Syrian Democratic Forces
- Abdulhakim Bachar, one of the most prominent Kurdish figures participating in the National Coalition, where he served as Vice President of the National Coalition for several sessions. He is also a founding member of the Damascus Declaration, as well as a founding member of the Kurdish National Council and its first elected president.
- Omar Aziz, Anarchist revolutionary, particularly noteworthy in the initial phase of the Syrian Revolution, affiliated with the Local Coordination Committees of Syria.

== See also ==
- Belligerents in the Syrian Civil War
- List of political parties in Syria
- Syrian civil war

=== Similar factions ===
- Libyan opposition (2011)
- Iranian opposition
