= Haitham al-Maleh =

Syrian human rights activist

Haitham al-Maleh هيثم المالح
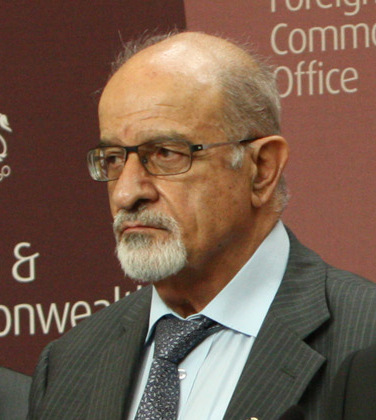
- Born: 15 August 1931 (age 94); Damascus, Syria
- Occupations: Judge, activist
- Known for: Democracy campaigner Human rights activist Lawyer of political prisoners in Syria

Haitham al-Maleh (Arabic: هيثم المالح, born August 15, 1931) is a Syrian human rights activist and former judge. An independent Islamist and longtime critic of Syria's Ba'athist regime, he was imprisoned several times after standing for human rights and calling for constitutional reforms. In the early 2000s, al-Maleh was a figure of the Damascus Spring. During the Syrian Civil War, he was active in opposition groups. He was a member of the Syrian National Council then of the Syrian National Coalition.

== Background ==
Born in Sarouja, Damascus, Haitham al-Maleh earned a degree in law and a diploma in international law from the Damascus University. He was first arrested in 1951 at the age of twenty when he called for an independent judiciary; he was imprisoned for three weeks. He became a judge in 1958. The first Ba'athist government dismissed him from the judicial bench because of his public criticism of the 1963 Emergency Law, which suspended constitutional rights and codified martial law. He returned to the practice of law after his dismissal.

While originally an advocate for democratic reforms, by the early 1970s, Maleh became an outspoken critic of the situation in Syria. The Syrian government ordered Maleh's arrest and detention numerous times because of his political activities. Maleh was jailed as a political prisoner between 1980 and 1986 because he publicly criticized the Syrian government's lack of commitment to repeal the Emergency Law and suppression of the Muslim Brotherhood in Syria, culminating in the quelling of the group in 1982. He went on hunger strikes at least twice during his detention. He has been active in Amnesty International since 1989.

In 2001, along with Riad Seif and other activists, Maleh was one of the major figures of the Damascus Spring. When the Human Rights Association in Syria was started in July 2001, he was elected president of the organization, a position he held until 2006. He also supported the 2005 Damascus Declaration.

Maleh wrote several times to Syrian President Bashar al-Assad criticizing the human rights violation in the country. Writing as the president of the Syrian Human Rights Association, he demanded the lifting of the Emergency Law. In 2003, he spoke before the German Parliament on the issue of Syrian human rights, describing al-Assad's rule as "a fascist dictatorship". When he returned, the Syrian government banned him from leaving the country for the next seven years.

He has received awards for his defence of human rights in Syria, including the Dutch Human Rights Prize awarded to him in 2006. The Syrian Government refused to allow him to leave the country to receive the award in the Netherlands. After weeks of uncertainty he learned of the final refusal to grant him an exit visa only the day before the ceremony. In 2004 Maleh received the French National Consultative Commission of Human Rights "Human Rights Honor Award" for his research on torture in Syria, and the annual award for the dignity of the Geneva Human Rights Defenders in 2010, in addition to other awards and honors.

== 2009 arrest ==
Maleh's most recent arrest was on 14 October 2009, a day after giving an interview on 'Panorama', a political analysis show on Barada TV, a London-based satellite channel operated by Syrian dissidents. He was referred to the Damascus military court and tried on charges of spreading false and misleading information that would "affect the morale of the nation", and sentenced to three years prison. Amnesty International named him a prisoner of conscience, "detained solely for the peaceful exercise of his right to freedom of expression", and called for his immediate release.

He was released on 8 March 2011 after a presidential amnesty on the anniversary of the arrival of the Ba'ath party's ascension to power, which was extended only to prisoners over 70 years old.

Maleh requested Syrian authorities to cease political detention permanently, release all political prisoners, and affirm the right of every Syrian citizen to express his opinion. He noted that political prisoners are those who voice their opinions, and are not advocates of violence.

== Syrian Civil War ==
On July 16 2011, at the beginning of the Syrian civil war, Maleh and other Islamist opposition activists held a "Syrian National Salvation Congress" and called for a unified leadership of the Syrian opposition. Maleh later participated to the creation of the Syrian National Council.

In an interview with The Daily Telegraph on 30 January 2012, Maleh stated that the situation in Syria had passed the point where peaceful resolution was possible and stated that "Assad and his family will be killed in Syria...the end for them will be that they are killed like Gaddafi."

In late February 2012, shortly before the second conference of the Friends of Syria Group in Istanbul, al-Maleh, together with several other high-profile members including Kamal al-Labwani, left the Syrian National Council and formed another group, the "Patriotic Action Front", ostensibly to demand more support for the Free Syrian Army. Al-Maleh commented that the split had been motivated by the leadership of SNC president Burhan Ghalioun and by the undue dominance of the Syrian Muslim Brotherhood over the council. On March 27, al-Maleh attended talks in Istanbul with the Syrian National Council but withdrew from the start, accusing the SNC of not respecting others and imposing its will. The Patriotic Action Front soon disintegrated due to internal conflicts.

In July 2012, it was announced that a Syrian coalition of "independent revolutionaries" had tasked al-Maleh to form a government-in-exile. Eventually, al-Maleh joined the Syrian National Coalition that was formed in November 2012, becoming head of its legal committee. In March 2013, he announced on behalf of the coalition that Ghassan Hitto would lead the Syrian Interim Government.

In February 2014, al-Maleh was appointed by the Syrian National Coalition as Syria's envoy to the Arab League.

After the fall of the Assad regime in December 2024, al-Maleh returned to Damascus and attempted to deliver a speech at the Umayyad Mosque. However, members of Hay'at Tahrir al-Sham forcibly removed him from the minbar.

== See also ==
- Kamal al-Labwani
- Aref Dalila
- Damascus Spring
- Damascus Declaration
- Sednaya Prison
