= Ahmad Jarba =

Syrian lawyer and politician (born 1969)

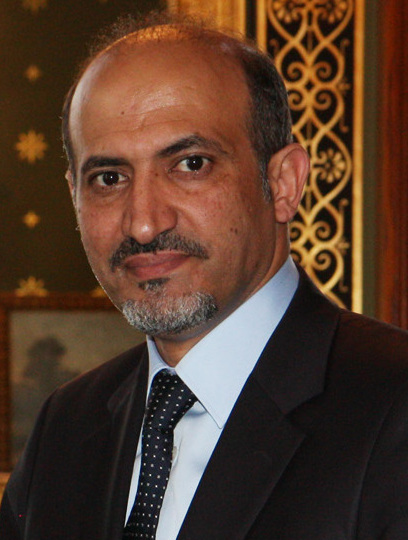
- Jarba in 2013

President of the Syrian National Coalition
- In office 6 July 2013 – 12 July 2014
- Prime Minister: Ghassan Hitto (Acting); Ahmad Tu'mah
- Preceded by: George Sabra (Acting)
- Succeeded by: Hadi al-Bahra

President of the Syria's Tomorrow Movement
- Incumbent
- Assumed office 11 March 2016
- Preceded by: Party established

Personal details
- Born: Ahmad al-Assi al-Jarba; 15 September 1969 (age 56) Qamishli, Hasakah Governorate, Syria
- Party: Syria's Tomorrow Movement (since 2016)
- Other political affiliations: Syrian National Coalition (2012–2025)
- Education: Beirut Arab University (LLB)

Ahmad al-Assi al-Jarba (Arabic: أحمد عوينان العاصي الجربا; born 25 October 1969) is a Syrian lawyer and politician who served as President of the Syrian National Coalition from 2013 to 2014. The leader of the Syria's Tomorrow Movement, Jarba has been widely described as a secular politician despite his leadership role within the traditionally conservative Shammar tribal confederation.

Jarba was born in Qamishli, Syria, into the Shammar tribal confederation, one of the largest Arab tribal groupings in Syria, Iraq, Jordan, and Saudi Arabia. He graduated in law from the Beirut Arab University. Before becoming active in the Syrian opposition, he was imprisoned by the Syrian government and was later recognized as a former political prisoner.

Following the outbreak of the Syrian civil war, Jarba became a member of the Syrian National Council and subsequently joined the National Coalition for Syrian Revolutionary and Opposition Forces, the principal political umbrella organization representing the Syrian opposition.

On 6 July 2013, Jarba was elected President of the Syrian National Coalition after defeating Mustafa Sabbagh, who was supported by Qatar, in a second round of voting during the coalition's general assembly. He succeeded Moaz al-Khatib and served as president until 11 July 2014. On 5 January 2014, he was re-elected to a second term, defeating former Syrian prime minister Riad Hijab by 13 votes. During his presidency, Jarba represented the coalition in international diplomatic efforts related to the Syrian conflict and sought to strengthen ties among the coalition's various political and military factions.

After leaving the coalition's presidency, Jarba founded the Syria's Tomorrow Movement, a secular political movement advocating a democratic and pluralistic Syrian state. The movement established an armed wing, the Elite Forces (Quwwat al-Nukhba), which later joined the Syrian Democratic Forces (SDF).

In September 2018, Jarba met with representatives of the Movement for a Democratic Society (TEV-DEM), a leading political organization in the Autonomous Administration of North and East Syria. The two sides issued a joint declaration calling for a democratic, pluralistic, and united Syria and expressed support for greater political cooperation in northeastern Syria.

Political offices
Preceded by George Sabra; Acting	President of the National Coalition for Syrian Revolutionary and Opposition Forces; 2013–2014	Succeeded by Hadi al-Bahra
