= Monzer Makhous =

Syrian geologist, politician, diplomat

Monzer Makhous منذر ماخوس
- Born: 1946 (age 79–80); Latakia Governorate
- Occupation: sedimentologist
- Known for: as of November 2012, representative of the Syrian National Coalition and future Syrian Ambassador to France "once a provisional government is established and recognised internationally."

Monzer Makhous (also Mounzir, منذر ماخوس; born 1946)) is a Syrian sedimentologist who became a member of the Syrian National Council during the Syrian civil war. As of November 2012, he was recognised by France as a representative of the National Coalition for Syrian Revolutionary and Opposition Forces and as the future Syrian Ambassador "once a provisional government is established and recognised internationally."

== Education and academic career ==
Makhous is a geologist specialising in the sedimentology of North African sedimentary basins.

== Political career ==
During the Syrian civil war, Makhous was a member of the Syrian National Council, affiliated with the National Bloc. After the National Coalition for Syrian Revolutionary and Opposition Forces was created in November 2012 and its leader, Moaz al-Khatib, held talks with French president François Hollande, Makhous was chosen to initially become "a representative of the coalition" in France and then the future Syrian Ambassador to France "once a provisional government is established and recognised internationally."

== Points of view ==
=== Alawite role in the Syrian civil war ===
Makhous, a member of the Alawi community, stated in December 2011, "The fact that Alawites have never been able to voice their anger at the regime is not because they supported it but because they have been suppressed for more than 40 years". He said that Alawis "have been the most affected by the brutality of Assad's regime," that Alawis participated in protests against the Bashar al-Assad government in Baniyas and Jableh and that Alawis "all have to declare that the Syrian regime does not represent them and that they condemn its brutality against the Syrian people. This is of vital importance for the Alawite community and for national unity in general."
