= Ahmad Tu'mah =

Syrian politician

Prime Minister of the Syrian Interim Government
- In office 14 October 2014 – 17 May 2016
- President: Hadi al-Bahra; Khaled Khoja; Anas al-Abdah
- Preceded by: Himself
- Succeeded by: Jawad Abu Hatab
- In office 14 September 2013 – 22 July 2014
- President: Ahmad Jarba; Hadi al-Bahra
- Preceded by: Ghassan Hitto (Acting)
- Succeeded by: Himself

Personal details
- Born: 1965 (age 60–61) Deir ez-Zor, Syria
- Party: Independent

Ahmad Saleh Tu'mah al-Khader (also spelled Tumeh, Touma and Tohme, Arabic: أحمد طعمة; born 1965, in Deir ez-Zor, Syria) is a Syrian politician who was elected as Prime Minister of the Syrian interim government created by the National Coalition for Syrian Revolutionary and Opposition Forces.

Tu'mah, a self-proclaimed moderate Islamist, won with 75 out of the 97 votes on a meeting held by the National Coalition in Istanbul and, as was with his predecessor Ghassan Hitto, has been tasked to create a government with 13 ministers to govern the zones in Syria currently under the control of the Free Syrian Army forces.

In a statement against the local Kurdish autonomy movement, Tu'mah said: "This movement is the mere product of the Democratic Union Party, and as soon as we topple the Assad regime we will end its short existence."

The interim government was dissolved on 22 July 2014. He was reelected on 14 October 2014 after several days of debate, and getting 63 votes out of 65 cast, although the coalition has 109 members with right to vote.
