= Syria's Tomorrow Movement =

Syria's Tomorrow Movement تيار الغد السوري
- Leader: Fouad Humeira
- President: Ahmad Jarba
- General Secretary: Ali el-Assy; Ahmad Awad
- Spokesperson: Monzer Akbik
- Founded: 11 March 2016 in Cairo, Egypt
- Ideology: Pluralist democracy Liberal democracy Secularism
- Democratic Council: 1 / 43

Party flag

Website
- http://www.alghadalsoury.com/

The Syria's Tomorrow Movement (Arabic: تيار الغد السوري) is a Syrian opposition party founded in March 2016 in Cairo by Ahmad Jarba, a Syrian National Council member. The party was backed by Egypt and the United Arab Emirates and cooperates with the National Coalition for Syrian Revolutionary and Opposition Forces, although it is not part of the coalition. They also cooperate with the Syrian Democratic Council of the Autonomous Administration of North and East Syria.

== Ideology ==
The movement aims to decentralize Syria and implement pluralist democracy. However, it opposes any partition of the state. The party considers Alawites, as with all other ethnic groups in Syria, to be an essential component of the Syrian people and called for greater inclusion of them in the opposition.

== Relations with other parties and states ==
During the formation of the movement, Egyptian and Lebanese officials attended the announcement. Although the party aims to oppose the government of Bashar al-Assad, a Russian embassy official and pro-Assad Syrians attended the official launch of the party, along with the Palestinian official Mohammed Dahlan. A Kurdistan Regional Government representative also attended the meeting.

In early April 2016, the head of Syria's Tomorrow Movement, Fouad Humeira, met with Anas Al-Abdah, the head of the Movement for Justice and Development in Syria and the overall president of the Syrian National Coalition. Al-Abdah expressed the SNC's readiness to cooperate with Syria's Tomorrow Movement.

In September, Ahmad Jarba met with the leader of the Movement for a Democratic Society, representing the de facto autonomous administration of the Federation of Northern Syria - Rojava, in order to form an agreement to participate in the governing of northeastern Syria. They issued a joint statement that "the monist powers insisting on one party, one flag and one nation are doomed to fail, and peoples are trying to realize their dreams for a democratic, pluralist and united Syria."

Weeks later, the Local Coordination Committees of Syria reported that a US helicopter transported Ahmed Jarba and Syrian actor Jamal Suliman from Iraqi Kurdistan to the Abu Hajar Airport near the town of Rmelan in northeastern Syria. After they arrived, the two met with the PYD official Eldar Khalil, along with politicians from other Kurdish parties in Syria.

The movement also signed an agreement with the National Coordination Committee for Democratic Change.

On 22 July 2017, the Syria's Tomorrow Movement, led by Ahmad Jarba, was involved in negotiations in Egypt between Russia and Jaysh al-Islam to implement a partial ceasefire in East Ghouta.

== Military wing ==
Elite Forces
- قوات النخبة
- Leaders: Muhedi Jayila (overall military commander); Muhammad Khalid Shakir (spokesman and commander); Muhammad Ramadan † (Saadallah al-Jabiri Battalion commander)
- Dates active: 2016 — ? (much of the unit defected to the SDF in 2017; its current status is unclear)
- Groups: Saadallah al-Jabiri Battalion; Gathering of al-Baggara Youth (until August 2017)
- Headquarters: Al-Shaddadah Subdistrict
- Active regions: Deir ez-Zor Governorate; Hasakah Governorate; Raqqa Governorate
- Ideology: Pluralist democracy
- Size: 3,500 (self claim, March 2017): 200–650 (other claims, April 2017); 1,000 (Rudaw claim, June 2017)
- Part of: Syrian Democratic Forces (entire militia officially 2016–17; some sub-units before and after these dates)
- Wars: the Syrian Civil War

On 18 April 2016, a unit of Free Syrian Army fighters of al-Shaitat and Shammar, originally from Deir ez-Zor Governorate and the Hasakah Governorate and calling themselves the Elite Forces, declared themselves to be the armed wing of Syria's Tomorrow Movement and stressed Kurdish-Arab unity in Syria. The group claimed to have captured 3 villages from the Islamic State 60 kilometres north of Deir ez-Zor. The Syrian Democratic Forces welcomed the presence of the Elite Forces although the group is not officially allied with it. Ahmad Jarba reportedly shipped weapons from Iraqi Kurdistan to Syria in order to arm the faction.

On 10 April 2017, a purported spokesman for the Elite Forces claimed that the group was not part of the SDF, would cooperate with both the SDF and Peshmerga Roj to capture Deir ez-Zor, and rejected federalism. On 15 April, this statement was denied by Muhammad Khalid Shakir, the official spokesman of the Elite Forces. He denied any disagreements between the Elite Forces and the SDF and said that "We are in the framework of the international coalition. The leadership of the coalition manages the operations on the ground. Our troops did not withdraw. We have completed the third phase of the Wrath of Euphrates Operation, and we will participate in all stages until Raqqa and Deir ez-Zor are freed." While the battle of Raqqa was still ongoing, the Elite Forces officially left the SDF, though elements of the group continued to cooperate with the SDF.

On 25 August 2017, 800 fighters left the Elite Forces and were fully integrated into the ranks of the SDF and its Deir ez-Zor Military Council. The fighters accused the Elite Forces of corruption. These forces consisted of 7 units of al-Baggara and al-Shaitat tribal fighters stationed in the eastern Raqqa and southern Hasaka countrysides, including the Gathering of al-Baggara Youth, led by Yasser al-Dahla. By early 2019, the Elite Forces were still active, but had very few troops left.
