= Yaser Tabbara =

American-Syrian activist

M. Yaser Tabbara served as the spokesperson and legal advisor for the President of the Syrian Interim Government (SIG), the National Coalition of Syrian Revolution and Opposition Forces (SOC), and the Syrian National Council (SNC). He was also a founding member of the SNC (National Council of Syria).

Tabbara is the Legal and Strategy Advisor and co-founder of the Syrian Forum. He is also the Managing Partner of the US-based Law Firm of Zarzour, Khalil and Tabbara, LLC, since 2008.

An international human rights attorney by profession Tabbara helped assemble evidence of Syrian regime crimes against humanity, in 2011, for submission to the International Criminal Court. He is a frequent media contributor and commentator on issues related to the Syrian uprising. He has long played a role in Syrian politics and has been working to bring educational reforms to Syria. During the 2011 Syrian uprising Tabbara took a stance in opposition to the government.

Tabbara also served as Executive Director of the Syrian American Council (SAC), Syrian American Council,

An advocate of Arab and Muslim American rights, Tabbara established Project Mobilize to support disenfranchised political candidates around Chicago. In 2004 Tabbara co-founded the Chicago Office of the Council for American Islamic Relations (CAIR-Chicago) and served as its Executive Director until deciding to relocate to Damascus, Syria.

In Damascus, Tabbara taught at the University of Kalamoon subjects related to Public International Law at the College of International Relations and Diplomacy. Shortly after, Tabbara worked with the International Bar Association (IBA) towards supporting judicial and legal reform in Syria.

Tabbara was born in Chicago but grew up in Damascus, Syria, before moving back to Chicago in 1993 to complete his undergraduate studies in Political Science and Economics from University of Illinois. Tabbara then went on to finish his Juris Doctor degree from the DePaul University College of Law, where he was a research assistant to M. Cherif Bassiouni. Upon graduating in 2002, Tabbara initiated the Post 9/11 Immigrant Legal Rights Project at Midwest Immigrant and Human Rights Center (MIHRC). Subsequently, he coordinated the Legal Education Reform Project, which was tasked with improving legal education standards at three Iraqi law faculties.
