= Syrian National Council =

Syrian opposition structure

- المجلس الوطني السوري; Al-Majlis al-Waṭanī as-Sūri
- Abbreviation: SNC
- Formation: 23 August 2011 (15 years ago)
- Purpose: Opposition to the Syria Ba'athist regime
- Headquarters: Istanbul, Turkey
- Region served: Syria
- Members: 420 members (in November 2012)
- Official language: Arabic
- Chairperson: Ahmad Jarba
- Executive Board: Abdulbaset Sieda; Mohamad Faruq Tayfur; Ahmad Ramadan; Hisham Marwah; Salem al-Musallat; Hussein al-Said; Abdulahad Astepho; Jamal al-Wared; Nazir al-Hakim; Khaled al-Saleh
- Spokesperson: Radwan Ziadeh
- Affiliations: Syrian National Coalition (11 November 2012 to 20 January 2014)
- Website: www.syriancouncil.org

The Syrian National Council (SNC), (Note: Arabic: المجلس الوطني السوري, romanized: Al-Majlis al-Waṭanī as-Sūri, French: Conseil national syrien) also known as the Syrian National Transitional Council or the National Council of Syria, was a Syrian opposition coalition based in Istanbul, Turkey. It was formed in August 2011 during the Syrian civil uprising (which escalated into civil war) against the government of Bashar al-Assad.

Initially, the council denied seeking to play the role of a government in exile, but this changed a few months later when violence in Syria intensified. The Syrian National Council sought the end of Bashar al-Assad's rule and the establishment of a modern, civil, democratic state. The SNC National Charter lists human rights, judicial independence, press freedom, democracy and political pluralism as its guiding principles. It acted as a conduit by which the factionalised Syrian opposition attracted and distributed money and arms from foreign sponsors.

On 28 October 2011, the SNC expressed worries about the Libyan scenario (with the violent overthrow of Muammar Gaddafi) being reiterated in Syria. It warned against a militarization of the conflict and insisted that the revolution was not sectarian but included all factions of the Syrian society. It also put its hopes in the multiplications of acts of civil disobedience as they "can be generalized, developed and expanded. This is because they are peaceful. These will be supported by businesses and others who are afraid of the costs of war. Peaceful methods are generalizable."

In November 2012, the Syrian National Council agreed to unify with several other opposition groups to form the National Coalition for Syrian Revolutionary and Opposition Forces, commonly named the Syrian National Coalition.

The Syrian National Council withdrew from the Syrian National Coalition on 20 January 2014 in protest at the decision of the coalition to attend the Geneva II Conference on Syria. The Coalition eventually supplanted the Council as the main representative body of the opposition. As of the mid-2010s, the Syrian National Council is no longer active.

== History ==
The SNC's formation was announced in the city of Istanbul, Turkey on 23 August 2011, after a succession of meetings in Turkey and elsewhere. Its stated purpose was to "represent the concerns and demands of the Syrian people." The creation of the SNC was celebrated by the Syrian protestors since the Friday protest following its establishment was dubbed "The Syrian National Council Represents Me". Yaser Tabbara, the council's spokesman at that time, said the membership of the council would include 115 to 120 members from all Syrian opposition groups, including the now defunct National Council of Syria. On 2 October 2011, the council formally declared its organisational affiliations and structure, to include a general assembly, a general secretariat and an executive board.

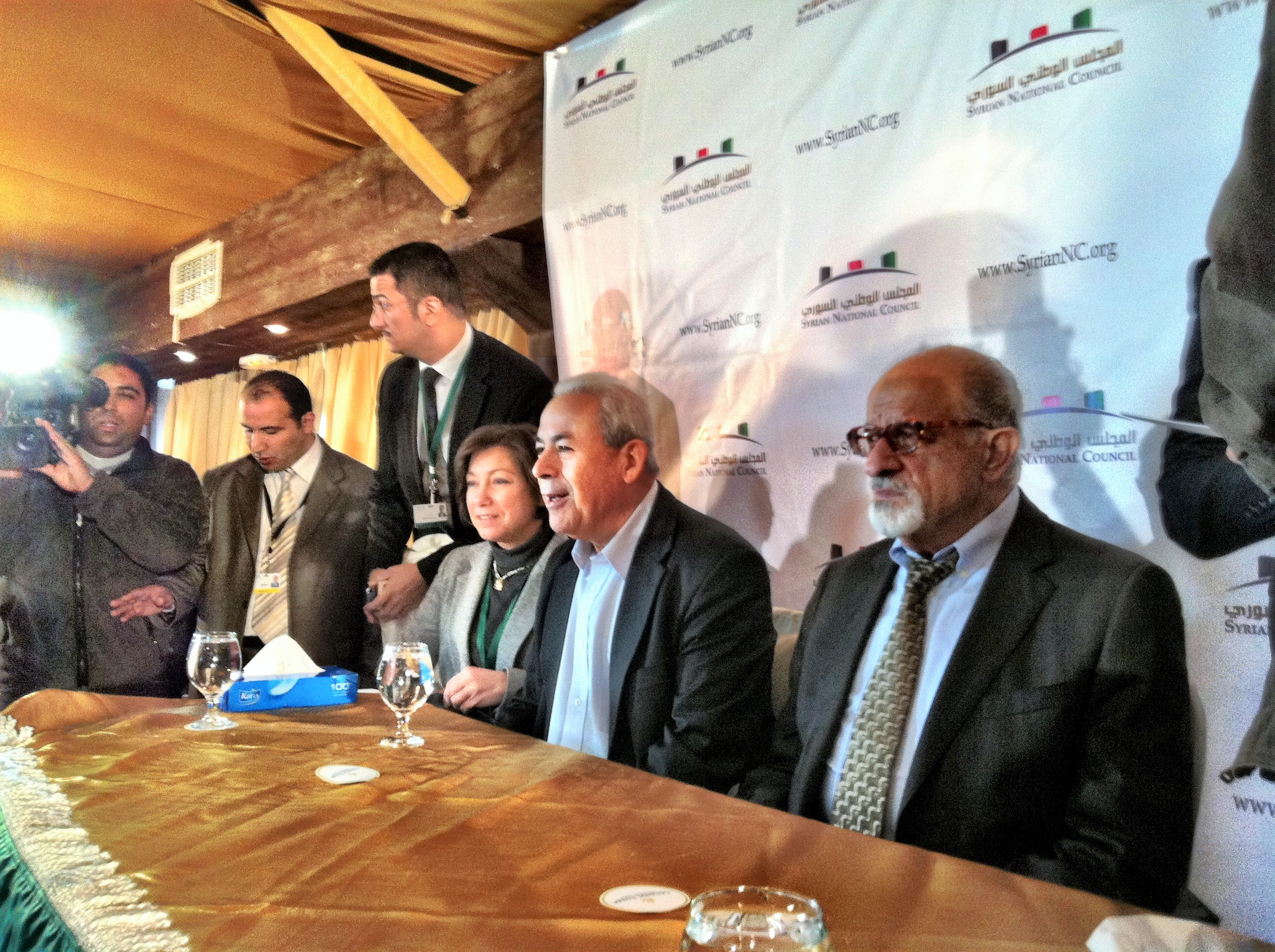
Bassma Kodmani (L), Burhan Ghalioun (C) and Haitham al-Maleh (R) at SNC's first congress in Tunis, 19 December 2011.

The SNC included many members of the exiled Syrian wing of the Muslim Brotherhood and was supported by the Damascus Declaration's exile wing. In 2011, the SNC itself claimed to represent approximately 60 per cent of the Syrian opposition.

Paris-based Syrian academic Burhan Ghalioun originally served as the SNC's most prominent spokesperson and was named in September 2011 as chair of the council. Former Muslim Brotherhood leader Ali Sadr el-Din Bayanouni stated that Ghalioun had been chosen because he "is accepted in the West and at home and, to prevent the regime from capitalising on the presence of an Islamist at the top of the SNC."

The SNC, despite having had a Kurdish chairman, did not have Kurdish nationalist members. The only Kurdish party from inside Syria to declare itself an affiliate of the SNC was the Kurdish Future Movement under the leadership of Mashaal Tammo, who was assassinated shortly after the announcement in the northeastern city of Qamishli. Abdulhakim Bashar, Secretary-General of the Kurdish Democratic Party of Syria, claims the SNC is too "much influenced by Turkey" and demanded guarantees for the Kurds in Syria by the SNC and says that Turkey would, in turn, be obliged to grant full rights to Turkey's Kurds.

In January 2012, the SNC came to review its position on the peaceful nature of the uprising. According to the SNC, the opposition was now faced with two options: "greater militarization of local resistance or foreign intervention." With China and Russia veto impeding a Security Council resolution, the international intervention scenario is unlikely to unfold. As a result, in the context of increasing defections in the military and the escalating violence in Syria, the SNC and the Free Syrian Army struck a deal in January 2012, recognising the units of anti-government rebels fighting in Syria. The SNC said that it was the duty of the opposition "to assist the rebels." While the SNC asserted that it would not provide arms directly to the Free Syrian Army, it would provide funds to "keep the Free Syrian Army afloat" and solicited donations to that effect.

In 2011 and 2012, the Syrian National Council was recognized as the legitimate representative of the Syrian people by several UN member states, including France, Spain, the United States, and the United Kingdom. Turkey expressed its support for the SNC. The European Union also recognized the SNC as legitimate representative. Other states established informal relations with the SNC, such as Japan.

The SNC was soon plagued with internal conflict. One secular member of the SNC claimed that more than half of the council are Islamists. On 13 March 2012, shortly before the second meeting of the Friends of Syria Group, three prominent members of the SNC resigned, giving as their reason that the SNC "had not gotten very far in working to arm the rebels". and demanding more support for the Free Syrian Army. The three were Haitham al-Maleh, a former judge and long-standing dissident, Islamist-leaning liberal and opposition leader Kamal al-Labwani and human rights lawyer Catherine al-Talli. They also protested Ghalioun's leadership and accused the SNC of being corrupt and a liberal front for the Muslim Brotherhood. They founded another opposition group called the Patriotic Action Front (also translated as "Syrian Patriotic Group") and announced that they would speed up "backing the national effort to bring down the regime with all available resistance means including supporting the Free Syrian Army". Even though the Patriotic Action Front soon disintegrated due to internal strife, the split caused the SNC to lose about one third of its members.

On 27 March 2012, during an Istanbul meeting called by Turkey and Qatar, all opposition groups - except the National Coordination Committee for Democratic Change, which had not attended - agreed to recognize the Syrian National Council as the "formal interlocutor and formal representative of the Syrian people". Abdual al-Haj of the SNC said that "now the international community no longer has an excuse to withhold support for the revolution, help arm the Free Syrian Army and establish safe zones to protect the civilian Syrian population." The BBC reported from the meeting that "[a]ll but one of Syria's disparate opposition groups have agreed to unite behind the Syrian National Council."

On April 1, 2012, the Friends of Syria Group - which includes most members of the Arab League, the United States, the European Union, and Turkey - formally recognized the Syrian National Council as the principal opposition structure and as a legitimate representative of the Syrian people. However, the SNC remained reluctant to form a government, whose authority would have superseded its own. It also had no presence on the ground in Syria, and played no role in military operations, which weakened its legitimacy.

On 10 June 2012, a new leader for Syrian National council was elected. Swedish based Abdulbaset Sida, a Kurd, took over for three months after Burhan Ghalioun was forced away.

In November 2012, the Syrian National Council agreed to unify with several other opposition groups to form the National Coalition for Syrian Revolutionary and Opposition Forces, commonly named the Syrian National Coalition, with the SNC having 22 out of 60 seats, not counting dissenters like al-Maleh and Riad Seif. Two members of the National Council, George Sabra and Ahmad Jarba, were successively presidents of the Coalition in 2013 and 2014.

In December 2012, the Friends of Syria Group transferred its recognition to the Syrian National Coalition, which was declared the "sole legitimate representative" of the Syrian people.

On 20 January 2014, the Syrian National Council announced that it was leaving the Syrian National Coalition in protest at the decision of the coalition to attend the Geneva II Conference on Syria. The Syrian National Council stated that participating in the talks would go backwards on its stance "to not enter negotiations" until president al-Assad left office.

The Syrian National Council was effectively replaced by the Coalition as the Syrian opposition's umbrella organization. In 2016, Jarba launched another group, Syria's Tomorrow Movement. In 2018, Al Jazeera English mentioned the Syrian National Council as "defunct".

== See also ==
- National Council for the Forces of the Peaceful Revolution (Yemen)
- National Transitional Council (Libya)
