= Hisham Marwah =

Syrian Lawyer

- Occupation: Syrian Lawyer
- Known for: member of the Syrian National Council

Hisham Marwah is a Syrian lawyer. He is the director of the legal office of the Syrian National Council.
