= Ghassan Hitto =

Syrian politician and businessman

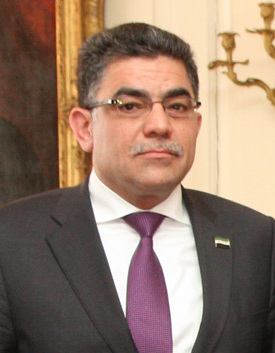
- Ghassan Hitto in 2013

Prime Minister of the Syrian Interim Government Acting
- In office 18 March 2013 – 14 September 2013
- President: Moaz al-Khatib; George Sabra (acting); Ahmad al-Jarba
- Preceded by: Position established
- Succeeded by: Ahmad Tu'mah

Personal details
- Born: 1963 (age 62–63) Damascus, Syria
- Party: Independent
- Education: Indiana University-Purdue University, Indianapolis; Indiana Wesleyan University

Ghassan Hitto (Arabic: غسان هيتو; born 1963) is a Syrian businessman, NGO executive and politician. In 2013, he was the first head of the interim government established by the Syrian opposition's National Coalition. Born in Damascus into a Kurdish family, he left Syria to the U.S. in 1980, became a naturalized American citizen and worked as an information technology executive and lived in Texas until the Syrian civil war. In late 2012, he relocated to Turkey. He was elected prime minister on 18 March 2013 by a narrow margin over former Ba'athist agricultural minister Assad Mustafa. Hitto resigned on 8 July 2013.

== Education ==
Hitto graduated from Indiana University-Purdue University at Indianapolis in 1989 with degrees in mathematics and computer science. He also received an M.B.A. at Indiana Wesleyan University in 1994.

== Career ==
Hitto is a former businessman who has lived in the United States for decades, most recently in Murphy, Texas. Before joining the opposition, he worked with Inovar, a Telecommunication firm, from 2001 to 2012.

Hitto's candidacy as primer minister of the opposition's government was backed by Qatar. France 24 reported that he was seen as close to the opposition's Islamist ranks. He received 35 of 48 votes cast for the premiership, according to the BBC. Following his election, at least 12 key members of the SNC suspended their membership partly in protest of Hitto's election on a majority vote instead of a consensus vote.

Hitto was unable to form a government because of persistent divisions within the coalition. On 8 July 2013, he announced his resignation as prime minister.

Later, Hitto was active as the CEO of Syrian Forum, a humanitarian NGO that intervened in favor of Syrian refugees.

== Personal life ==
Hitto is married to Suzanne Hitto, an American schoolteacher; they have four children, Amer, Imran, Obaida, Lama all born in the United States. He has worked in the technology sector and supported the private school Brighter Horizons Academy founded in 1989 by the Islamic Services Foundation (ISF). He is also a founding member of the Muslim Legal Fund of America created after the 11 September 2001 attacks to give legal aid to Muslims.

On June 26, 2026, Ghassan Hitto was featured on The Thinking Muslim podcast.
