= Abdul Hakim Bashar =

Syrian politician (born 1958)

Abdul Hakim Hawas Bashar
- عبد الحكيم حواس بشار

Member of the People's Assembly
- Incumbent
- Assumed office 1 July 2026
- Appointed by: Ahmed al-Sharaa

Personal details
- Born: 15 May 1958 (age 68) Khalid, Hasakah Governorate, United Arab Republic
- Party: Kurdistan Democratic Party of Syria
- Other political affiliations: Kurdish National Council
- Education: Damascus University

Abdul Hakim Hawas Bashar (Note: Arabic: عبد الحكيم حواس بشار. Also translated as Abdulhakim Bashar) (born 15 May 1958) is a Syrian paediatrician and politician who was appointed as a member of the People's Assembly on 1 July 2026. A member of the Kurdish National Council (ENKS), he co-founded the party and was formerly its president. In 2026, he was appointed to the People's Assembly by Ahmed al-Sharaa.

== Early life and career ==
Abdul Hakim Hawas Bashar was born on 15 May 1958 in Khalid, a village near the town of Amuda in Hasakah Governorate. He graduated from Damascus University in 1987 as a paediatrician. He joined the Kurdistan Democratic Party. Bashar was elected member of the party's central committee in 1991, and a member of its political bureau in 1996.

Bashar formerly led the Kurdistan Democratic Party - Syria, and is currently a member of its political bureau. He also served as the second vice president of the Syrian Interim Government from 2016 to 2017. He attended the 2017 Geneva peace talks on Syria as a delegate of ENKS, and in 2021, he was part of a group that met the UN secretary general.
