= Suheir Atassi =

Syrian politician

Suheir al-Atassi
- سهير الأتاسي
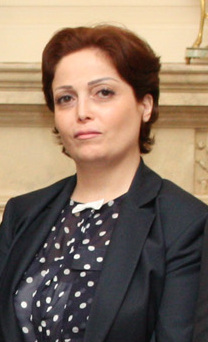
- Atassi in 2013

Vice President of the National Coalition for Syrian Revolutionary and Opposition Forces
- In office 12 November 2012 – 4 January 2015 Serving with Riad Seif
- President: Moaz al-Khatib
- Preceded by: Position established
- Succeeded by: Noura al-Ameer

Personal details
- Born: 1971 (age 54–55) Damascus, Syria
- Relations: Jamal al-Atassi (father)
- Education: Damascus University
- Occupation: Vice-president of the National Coalition for Syrian Revolutionary and Opposition Forces; Lawyer
- Known for: Democracy activist Women's activist Secular activist

Suheir al-Atassi (Arabic: سهير الأتاسي, romanized: Suhair al-ʾAtāsī; born 1971) is a Syrian secular activist in the Syrian opposition, and co-vice-president of the National Coalition for Syrian Revolutionary and Opposition Forces between November 2012 and December 2013. She has been called the "Lady of the Revolution" and is widely respected in secular and intellectual circles within the Syrian opposition structure. She had previously run the media wing of the banned Jamal Atassi Forum, which was named after her father, a founding member of the Ba'ath Party who later left and founded the Democratic Arab Socialist Union.

Suheir Atassi was born in Damascus in 1971 to a prominent political family from Homs. She is daughter of Jamal al-Din al-Atassi, prominent pan-Arabist in Syria. She studied French literature and education at the University of Damascus, and was active in the Damascus Spring, helping to form and run the Jamal al-Atassi Forum. She revived the forum online in 2009 in order to help promote democracy and human rights in Syria. On 16 March 2011 she was arrested for her activities. After her release, she had to go into hiding before fleeing Syria to Jordan and then France.

In December 2013, Atassi resigned as Vice-President of the exile 'National Coalition' after the Assistance Coordination Unit, an opposition aid agency, went on strike over claims of mismanagement of aid delivery and funding. She said she would keep her position as chairwoman for the Assistance Coordination Unit, based in Turkey. On 25 April 2018, Atassi resigned from the National Coalition itself, citing the SNC's relations with Russia.
