= 2024 anti-Turkish riots in Syria =

Escalation of violence in northern Syria

- Part of the Syrian civil war and the Turkish occupation of northern Syria
| Date | 1 – 3 July 2024 (2 days) |
| Location | Aleppo Governorate; al-Hasakah Governorate; Idlib Governorate;damascus Governorate; Syria |
| Result | Turkish and pro-Turkey SNA victory: Riots suppressed |

Belligerents
| Protestors; Anti-Turkey factions of the Syrian National Army | Turkey; Syrian Interim Government |

Casualties and losses
| 5 killed | None |
- 3 protestors killed, 20 injured

In early July 2024, violent anti-Turkish riots occurred in northern Syria, within areas occupied by Turkey and Turkish-backed Syrian opposition forces. Local protesters and armed militants attacked and set fire to Turkish government buildings, military bases, and attacked Turkish civilians in the region. The clashes coincided with anti-Syrian riots in Turkey.

== Background ==
Prior to the clashes, tensions between Syrian refugees and Turks had been intensifying in Turkey. The country, which hosts over 3 million Syrian refugees, has faced accusations of discrimination against this population. Furthermore, nearly 30,000 Syrian refugees were forcibly deported from Turkey in 2023 and subjected to inhumane treatment, according to the Syrians for Truth and Justice Institute.

In a speech on 28 June 2024, Turkish President Erdoğan expressed his willingness to restore relations with the Syrian government under Bashar al-Assad, inciting anger among the Syrian opposition and refugees. On the same day, Turkey reopened the Abu al-Zandin crossing near al-Bab, facilitating commercial connections between Turkish-controlled areas and Syrian government-held territories in the eastern Aleppo countryside. Subsequently, on 30 June 2024, an anti-Syrian pogrom erupted in the Turkish city of Kayseri after a Syrian national was accused of sexually abusing a child. Dozens of Syrian-owned shops and offices were set ablaze, and 14 police officers were injured.

== Clashes ==
On 1 July 2024, violent riots erupted in Turkish-occupied Northern Syria and the rebel-held Idlib Governorate, where several Turkish military bases are located. In the town of Al-Rai, protesters removed Turkish flags from government institutions and military bases, obstructing the passage of commercial convoys and trucks from Turkey. In the town of Azaz, employees of the Turkish postal service, PTT, were expelled from their offices. Subsequently, armed clashes erupted in Afrin, where gunmen attacked the Turkish military headquarters. At the Syria-Turkey border, militants opened fire on trucks coming from the Turkish border, resulting in the burning of 11 trucks in total. At least three protesters and five militants were killed during the clashes.

On 2 July 2024, Turkey shut down all its border crossings with Syria, including the Bab al-Hawa Border Crossing, which serves as a trade and transit route for over 3 million people. Additionally, reports emerged of internet and power outages in Syrian opposition-controlled areas.

On 3 July 2024, traffic resumed through the Bab al-Hawa Border Crossing after a two day hiatus. In the town of Ras al-Ayn, fighters from the Hamza Division and Ahrar al-Sharqiya, along with local residents, demonstrated against the ongoing attacks on Syrians in Turkey. The former reportedly pulled some of its fighters from the frontline town of Abu Rasin in protest.

== Reactions ==
Syrian Democratic Forces: Leader, Mazloum Abdi said that, despite differences, Syrians were united by national honor and independence. Abdi condemned the attacks on Syrians in Kayseri, and called for the protection of their lives and dignity. Abdi also welcomed all Syrians who rioted to SDF controlled areas in north and eastern Syria, extending a hand to save the country together.

== See also ==
- Inter-rebel conflict during the Syrian civil war
