= Abdulbaset Sieda =

Kurdish-Syrian politician

Abdulbaset Sieda عبد الباسط سيدا Ebdilbasit Seyda

President of the Syrian National Council
- In office 10 June 2012 – 9 November 2012
- Preceded by: Burhan Ghalioun
- Succeeded by: George Sabra

Personal details
- Born: 22 June 1956 (age 70) Amuda, Syrian Republic
- Education: Damascus University

Abdulbaset Sieda (/ˌɑːbdəlˈbɑːsət ˈsiːdə/ AHB-dəl-BAH-set SEE-də; Arabic: عبد الباسط سيدا / ALA-LC: Abd al-Bāsiṭ Sīdā; Kurdish: Ebdilbasit Seyda; born 22 June 1956) is a Kurdish-Syrian academic and politician. He is the former President of the Syrian National Council (SNC), succeeding Burhan Ghalioun in June 2012. He has written a number of books on the Kurds in Syria and his academic work specializes in ancient civilizations.

== Background ==
Sieda was born in Amuda, a town populated by Kurds in Al-Hasakah Governorate, Syria. He obtained a Ph.D. from the University of Damascus and was a university professor in Libya from 1991 to 1994. He has written a number of books on the Kurds in Syria. After Libya he went into exile to Sweden and specialized in the study of ancient civilizations.

He joined the SNC in 2011 as an independent activist (not a member of a political party) and was elected to the executive. He was chosen as the head of its human rights department. In June 2012 he was the consensus candidate for the three-month presidency of the SNC, succeeding Burhan Ghalioun, who had headed it since it was formed in 2011. SNC officials described him as an honest and conciliatory figure who could unite the SNC's factions and appeal to ethnic and religious minorities in Syria who fear the opposition.

After his election he said his main task was to expand and reform the SNC, making it more inclusive and democratic. Within Syria, he said he wanted to strengthen links with the Free Syrian Army, a loose coalition of army defectors. He called on the United Nations Security Council to pass a resolution under Chapter VII of the U.N. Charter, which allows for the use of force.

However, Kurdish activists and politicians in his native province distanced themselves from him. Anti-government protests after his election raised banners saying he did not represent him because he opposed federalism. A spokesman of the Kurdish Youth Movement—the largest youth movement in the Kurdish areas of Syria and a component of the main Kurdish opposition Kurdish National Council—said Sieda "joined the ranks of the enemies of Kurdish people" when he refused to walk out of the SNC in March when the other Kurdish parties left. A representative of the Kurdistan Democratic Party of Syria accused him of "following the Turkish agenda" and said he "represents only himself".

== Selected publications ==
- ——— (2003). المسألة الكردية في سورية : فصول منسية من معاناة مستمرة [The Kurdish Issue in Syria: Forgotten Chapters From an Ongoing Tragedy]. Uppsala: ʻAbd al-Bāsiṭ Sīdā. ISBN 916314171X.
