= Kamal al-Labwani =

Syrian doctor and artist (born 1957)

- Born: October 10, 1957 (age 69); Zabadani, Syria
- Occupations: Doctor, activist

Kamal al-Labwani (Arabic: كمال اللبواني; born October 10, 1957, in Zabadani, Syria) is a Syrian doctor and artist, known for being imprisoned for several years by Bashar al-Assad's regime. He was released from Adra Prison, near Damascus on November 15, 2011. Before his release, Amnesty International called him a prisoner of conscience. At the beginning of the Syrian civil war, he was briefly a member of the Syrian National Council.

== Life ==
Al-Labwani comes from the small town of Zabadani in the Rif Dimashq province, close to the Lebanese border.

In 1982, while serving as a military doctor, he observed the Hama massacre, in which the government crushed the uprising by the Muslim Brotherhood. This induced him to oppose Syria's Ba'athist regime.

He founded the Syrian Liberal Democratic Union and joined the "Damascus Spring" movement, which briefly flourished after Bashar al-Assad became President of Syria in June 2001 after the death of his father.

Al-Labwani was arrested in September 2001 after attending a political seminar in the house of fellow activist and politician Riad Seif. Al-Labwani was taken to ‘Adra prison and held initially in incommunicado detention and then in solitary confinement. Subsequently he gained access to his lawyer and he was allowed family visits. On 28 August 2002 the Supreme State Security Court (SSSC) sentenced him to three years in prison on charges including "inciting armed revolt". After serving his sentence he was released in September 2004.

During his first imprisonment al-Labwani was not allowed writing or reading materials but obtained painting supplies in his cell after holding a hunger strike, during which he lost 20 kg. He wrote two books and several poems "in his head", but most of his paintings were confiscated. In 2005, he managed to bring about 40 of his paintings to England, which were then shown at an exhibition in Basildon. With the sale of some of his paintings, he financed his trips to the U.S. and through Europe, attempting to raise support for the opposition in Syria, on a platform of democracy and human rights. During these trips he attended the Liberal Democrats’ Conference and visited the UK Houses of Parliament, the European Parliament, and the White House. He was the first human rights defender and dissident from inside Syria to be invited to discuss the case for Syrian Democracy at the White House.

On his return to Syria on 8 November 2005, al-Labwani was arrested at Damascus International Airport, and was imprisoned in Adra prison in Damascus. His cell, intended to house 32 but containing more than 60, was in Wing 5, normally reserved for violent prisoners.

On 10 May 2007, al-Labwani was sentenced by the criminal court in Damascus to 12 years in prison, with hard labour, on charges of "communicating with a foreign country and inciting it to initiate aggression against Syria", despite no evidence being presented by the prosecution other than their interpretation of “diplomatic pressure” to mean “violent aggression".

On 23 April 2008 he was sentenced by a military court in Damascus to an additional three years in prison, on charges of "weakening national sentiment" and "insulting the head of state", bringing his total sentence to 15 years. The only evidence against him was that prepared for them and read out by his fellow prisoners.

In May 2008, the European Union Presidency issued a Declaration condemning the additional sentence handed down to Dr. al-Labwani, and called for his immediate release and for him to be treated humanely whilst imprisoned. The Declaration asserted that the sentence clearly violated the principles of the rule of law and contradicted Syria's international obligations and commitments, specifically citing the Universal Declaration on Human Rights and the International Covenant on Civil and Political Rights, to both of which Syria is a signatory.

In March 2009, the United Nations Working Group on Arbitrary Detention, a UN body responsible for the investigation of complaints of arbitrary detention, released its opinion that al-Labwani’s imprisonment constituted arbitrary detention. The Working Group concluded that Dr. Labwani “had been condemned for the peaceful expression of his political views and for having carried out political activities” that are protected under international law, and also deemed his trial unfair.

Months into the uprising in Syria, the Syrian government announced on November 15, 2011, that it had released 1,180 prisoners, in what appeared to be an effort to show flexibility and sincerity only hours before the Arab League was set to suspend Syria as punishment for President Bashar al-Assad’s repression of dissent. Rights activists confirmed that the freed prisoners included Kamal al-Labwani, halfway through his 15-year sentence. Reuters quoted his daughter as saying that Mr. Labwani had no idea that Syria was in the throes of an upheaval, having been denied outside contact.

After his release, Labwani and his family obtained asylum in Sweden. He joined the Syrian National Council and became a member of its general secretariat. However, in March 2012, Labwani and several other high-profile members including Haitham al-Maleh left the SNC in protest of the leadership of Burhan Ghalioun and the Muslim Brotherhood's influence over the council. They founded a rival group, the "Patriotic Action Front", which demanded more support for the Free Syrian Army. However, the Patriotic Action Front soon disintegrated due to internal conflicts.

In March 2014, he suggested in an interview with the London newspaper "Al-Arab" a military intervention by Israel in support of the Syrian armed opposition. In return, he proposed to renounce all Syrian claims to the Golan Heights.

In September 2014 he visited Israel for the World Summit on Counter-Terrorism of the International Institute for Counter-Terrorism in Herzliya. He met wounded Syrian civilians being treated in Ziv Hospital (Tsfat) and said "I visited Jerusalem, Tel Aviv and I saw your society and your state, and I promised to write articles about this visit. We are neighbors and we could be friends."

In February 2016 he again visited Israel, and called for a small safe-zone to be created in Syria near the border with the Israeli held part of the Golan Heights. He said the local population there would defend itself from Islamist groups, the regime, and Hezbollah if given the weapons and assistance to do so.

== Family ==
In May 2011, two of Labwani's children, Hind al-Labwani and Omar al-Labwani, went into hiding after taking part in the 2011 anti-government protests.
