= Syria Direct =

Independent news organization based in Germany

Syria Direct or Syria:direct (Arabic: سوريا على طول), founded in 2013, is an independent news organization based in Berlin, Germany, that provides news coverage on Syria's war and politics, and trains journalists. It was originally funded in Amman, Jordan by an American organization, the Global Peace and Development (GPD) Charitable Trust, as well as by the US State Department and several embassies in Amman.

== Online news ==
Syria Direct is published in English and Arabic. The articles are for readers who are already knowledgeable about Syria but want more detailed information. Syria Direct employs a small team of Syrian and international reporters who talk to Syrian activists and civilians on both sides of the conflict every day. Syrian journalists write the stories in Arabic and English. The website is bilingual so all articles are translated into English/Arabic, fact-checked and edited, then published. Their Facebook page has 144,000 followers. Thousands of people follow their Twitter account.

== Journalism training ==
Syria Direct also has a training program for journalists from Syria. In the past, the training program has received funding from the US Embassy Amman's Public Affairs Section, the Syria-Iraq office of the Konrad Adenauer Stiftung organization, and the Canadian Embassy in Amman. Every six months they train twelve new Syrian journalists. The trainees' stories have been published in USA Today, CNN.com, Radio Free Europe, and international new organizations like Le Monde and The Toronto Globe and Mail. Syria Direct had, as of September 2016, trained 70 journalists, some of whom have since started their own news organizations. By April 2018, this number had risen to 150 journalists from 10 cohorts, made possible by a grant from the US State Department.
