= Moaz al-Khatib =

Syrian politician

- معاذ الخطيب
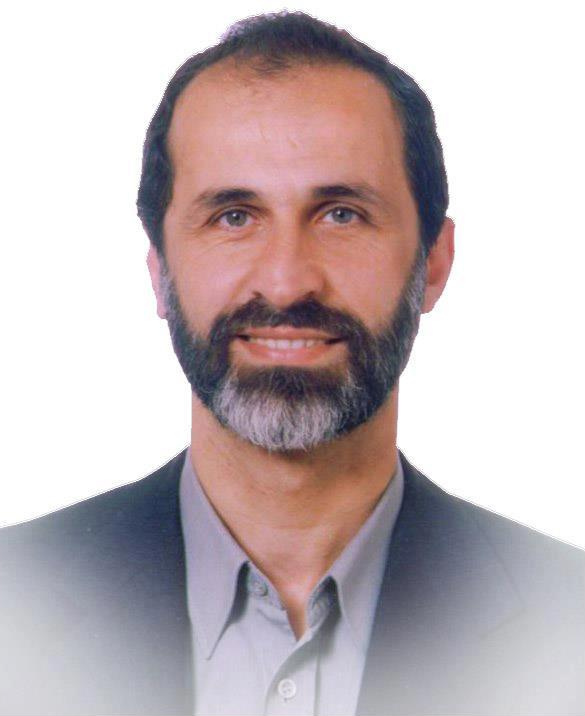

1st President of the National Coalition for Syrian Revolutionary and Opposition Forces
- In office 11 November 2012 – 22 April 2013
- Prime Minister: Ghassan Hitto
- Vice President: Riad Seif; Suheir Atassi
- Preceded by: Position established
- Succeeded by: George Sabra (Acting)

Personal details
- Born: 1960 (age 65–66) Damascus, United Arab Republic (now Syria)
- Party: Independent

Ahmad Moaz Al-Khatib Al-Hasani (Arabic: أحمد معاذ الخطيب الحسني, born 1960) is a former president of the National Coalition for Syrian Revolutionary and Opposition Forces. He is also a former imam of the Umayyad Mosque in Damascus.

== Early life and career ==
Born in 1960, Khatib comes from a well-known and notable Sunni Muslim Damascene family. His father, Sheikh Mohammed Abu al-Faraj al-Khatib, was a prominent Islamic scholar and preacher at the Umayyad Mosque.

At university, Khatib studied applied geophysics. He spent six years working for the Al-Furat Petroleum Company, Syria's main oil producer. He is also a member of the Syrian Geological Society and the Syrian Society for Psychological Science; he was president of the Islamic Society of Urbanization. His status as the former imam made him a key figure in Syria's Sunni religious establishment.

Khatib established the Islamic Civilization Society. He taught Sharia (Islamic Law) at the Dutch Institute Sheikh Badr al-Din al-Husni in Damascus, and Daawa (Call to Islam) studies at the Tahzib Institute for Sharia Sciences, as well as traveling extensively to teach internationally.

== Political and religious views ==
Khatib has been described as a moderate Islamist. Foreign Policy questioned this, pointing to articles on his website that contained numerous instances of antisemitic writing; including in Khatib's own articles, which also contained a degree of animosity towards the West.

The Syrian journalist and writer Rana Kabbani, a long time friend of Khatib, said, "Over the years, we have had a very intense political conversation about what needed to be done in Syria, long discussions about what was wrong with the society and what could be done about it." Kabbani continued to say, "He comes from an area in the old city of Damascus, a part of the city that was noted for its advocacy against French colonialists, producing freedom fighters. It was a traditional Damascene Muslim scene, a devout Sunni area with a long history of resistance. He cared very deeply about the victims of the 1982 massacre [in the Syrian city of Hama]. He was always seeking for ways to house or educate those [survivors] that the state wanted killed or banished."

He is a supporter of Qatar-based Egyptian Sunni Muslim cleric and preacher Yusuf al-Qaradawi. He even placed al-Qaradawi on equal footing with the Tunisian Mohamed Bouazizi, whose self-immolation marked beginning of the Arab Spring. He referred to al-Qaradawi as "our great Imam". Khatib has also referred to Shia Muslims as "rejectionists" and stated that the Shi'ites "establish lies and follow them", on occasions when he spoke to an Arab public. Analysts thus suspect him of adhering to some sectarian anti-Shia (and thus anti-Alawi) resentment. In an interview with Al Jazeera he said it would be better if Alawites would convert to Shia Islam, so they could follow a clear and structured faith. In stark contrast to his speeches and statements in Arabic, on other occasions Khatib has stressed that all creeds will need to be respected within Syria.

He was imprisoned several times for his criticism of the Syrian government during the ongoing armed uprising against President Bashar al-Assad before he fled the country and settled in Cairo. Khatib himself is not allied to any political party. Khatib is an active proponent of political plurality, including equality for women.

In October 2012, he was critical of the role Salafist militants had played as the civil war violence escalated, saying their prominence had allowed western and other countries to portray the uprising in Syria as "extremist".

In his statement to a crowd near Damascus soon after the Syrian uprising in 2011, he said "My brothers, we lived all our lives, Sunnis, Shiites, Alawites, and Druze, as a one-hearted community. And with us lived our dear brothers [Christians] who follow Isa [Jesus], peace be upon him. We should adhere to this bond between us and protect it at all times." Adding that "Any garden is so nice if full of flowers of all kinds." After being elected president of the National Coalition for Revolutionary Forces and the Syrian Opposition he said “I say to you that Alawites are closer to me than many other people I know,” and “When we talk about freedom, we mean freedom for every single person in this country.” Despite this, he does not favour secular government; in a November 2011 interview, Khatib called for Sunni scholars and Islamic Sharia law to form the base of any future Syrian political and judicial system, which was realised shortly before his resignation from the role of president.

== Involvement in the Syrian civil war ==
In July 2012, Khatib fled Syria following multiple periods of imprisonment.

On 11 November 2012, Khatib was elected President of the National Coalition for Syrian Revolutionary and Opposition Forces, a coalition of opposition groups formed the same day. The coalition has since been recognized as the legitimate government of Syria by a number of countries. After his election, Khatib called on world powers to fully arm the Free Syrian Army. He has also called on the U.S. to reconsider its 2012 decision to declare the Al-Nusra Front as a terrorist organization, describing Al-Nusra as an ally in the rebellion to topple the Assad government and refusing US requests to denounce Al-Nusra's tactics.

Prior to his appointment, Khatib was open to negotiating with President Bashar al-Assad, arguing that dialogue did not mean "surrendering to the regime's cruelty" and was the "lesser of two evils." On 30 January 2013 he created controversy in the Syrian opposition by offering to meet with Assad.

Khatib resigned his post on 24 March 2013, although he continued in office until 21 April. Khatib did not specify the reason for his resignation. The refusal of Western powers to provide military support appeared to be a factor, as was the controversial election of Ghassan Hitto as prime minister of a government in exile, a development that seemed to reduce the likelihood of successful peace negotiations. In a subsequent interview, Khatib cited interference by regional funding nations—apparently Saudi Arabia and Qatar—as his reason for quitting.

Political offices
New office	President of the National Coalition for Syrian Revolutionary and Opposition Forces; 2012–2013	Succeeded by George Sabra; Acting
