= Friends of Syria Group =

International diplomatic collective of countries and bodies

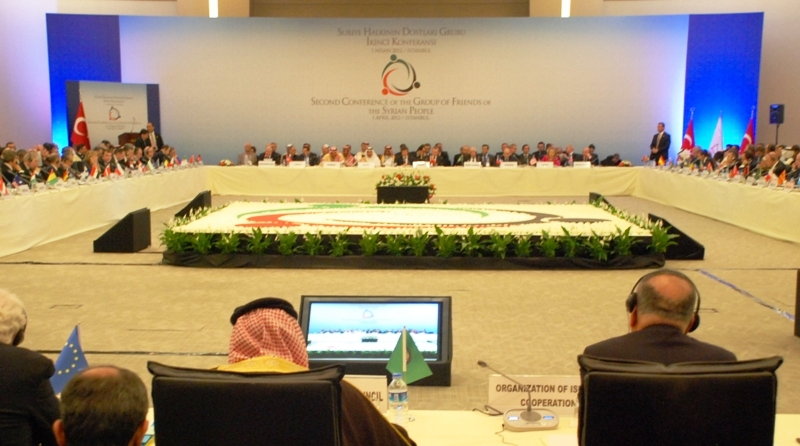
The second Group of Friends of the Syrian People meeting in Istanbul, Turkey on 1 April 2012

The Group of Friends of the Syrian People (sometimes Friends of Syria Group, Friends of the Syrian People Group, Friends of Democratic Syria or simply Friends of Syria) was an international diplomatic collective of countries and bodies convening periodically on the topic of Syria outside the U.N. Security Council. The collective was created in response to a Russian and Chinese veto on a Security Council resolution condemning the actions of the Syrian Ba'athist government during the Syrian civil war.

== History, purpose ==
The group was initiated by then-French president Nicolas Sarkozy, with the purpose to find a solution to the Syrian conflict, after Russia and China had vetoed a 4 February 2012 UN Security Council resolution. Its first meeting took place on 24 February 2012 in Tunisia. The second meeting took place the same year on 1 April in Istanbul, Turkey. The third meeting of the Friends of Syria took place in Paris in early July 2012. The fourth summit took place in Marrakesh in December 2012.

== Inaugural conference in Tunisia ==
On 24 February 2012, the Friends of Syria met for the first time, in Tunis. Then U.S. Secretary of State Hillary Clinton and U.S. officials Anne-Marie Slaughter and Michael Hirsh advocated that Turkey, Qatar, Saudi Arabia and Jordan would be able to create "no-kill zones", and argued that Syria was more central to American interests than Libya had been. The Syrian National Council featured prominently at the conference, and issued a seven-point list of demands, among which,

If the regime fails to accept the terms of the political initiative outlined by the Arab League and end violence against citizens, the Friends of Syria should not constrain individual countries from aiding the Syrian opposition by means of military advisers, training and provision of arms to defend themselves.

== Istanbul conference ==
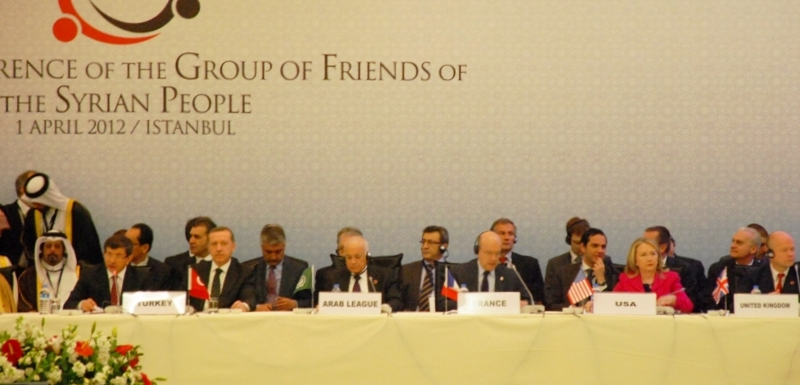
Participants at the Istanbul conference on 1 April 2012

Seventy nations participated in the conference held on 1 April 2012 to support Syrian opposition and increase pressure on the Syrian government. The Syrian National Council claiming the opposition is now united called for "serious action" and said they will "take charge of the payment of fixed salaries of Free Syrian Army". The Turkish PM defended what he called "Syrians' right to self-defence" and demanded the international community to speak up for the Syrian people. "We also believe the international community has a moral obligation to act. The bloodshed in Syria must stop," He added. Hamad bin Jassim bin Jaber Al Thani (Qatari Prime Minister), Arab League Secretariat and contemporary US Secretary of State Hillary Clinton supported taking stronger measures against the Syrian government.

The Government-owned Syrian Arab News Agency denounced the meeting calling it "a series of related circles of conspiracy against Syria" and identified participants as "enemies of Syria".

== Paris conference ==
The third meeting of the Friends of Syria group opened on 6 July 2012 in Paris, France. Speakers addressing the meeting included William Hague, Laurent Fabius, Ahmet Davutoğlu and Hillary Clinton.

== Marrakesh conference ==
The fourth meeting of the Friends of Syria group opened on 12 December 2012 in Marrakesh, Morocco.

== Rome February 2013 meeting ==
On 28 February 2013, only 11 members of the Friends of Syria held their meeting in Rome.

== Amman conference ==
On 22 May 2013, a conference in Amman was opened to discuss the US-Russian proposal for peace talks.

== Doha conference ==
On 22 June 2013, a conference in Doha was opened to discuss how to organise the delivery of military and other kinds of aid for Syrian rebels.

== Participants ==
The conference in Marrakech, on 12 December 2012, was attended by delegates of 114 states.

In 2013, however, the number of nations represented at the meetings fell to 11.

=== Countries ===
Members of the Friends of Syria group, which met in 2013 in Rome, Istanbul and London, are often referred to as the 'London 11'.

- Egypt
- France
- Germany
- Italy
- Jordan
- Qatar
- Saudi Arabia
- Turkey
- United Arab Emirates
- United Kingdom
- United States

=== Syrian opposition groups ===
- National Coalition of Syrian Revolution and Opposition Forces

=== International organisations ===
International organisations participating in the Friends of Syria conference included:

- African Union
- Arab League
- Arab Maghreb Union
- European Union
- Gulf Cooperation Council
- Organisation of Islamic Cooperation
- United Nations

== See also ==
- Friends of Libya
- Syrian peace process
