= Syrian Interim Government =

Quasistate of a faction within the Syrian opposition

Syrian Interim Government الحكومة السورية المؤقتة Ḥukūmat as-Sūriyya al-Muwaqqata
- 2013–2025
- Flag Emblem

- Territories administered by the SIG on 24 November 2023, prior to the 2024 Syrian opposition offensives
- Status: Government-in-exile (2013–2016); Client state of Turkey (2016–2025)
- Capital: Istanbul (until 2016); Azaz (until 2025)
- Official languages: Arabic
- Religion: Islam (de jure)
- Government: Unitary provisional government
- President of Syrian National Coalition
  - 2012–2013 (first): Moaz al-Khatib
  - 2023–2025 (last): Hadi al-Bahra
- Prime Minister
  - 2013 (first): Ghassan Hitto
  - 2019–2025 (last): Abdurrahman Mustafa
- Historical era: Syrian civil war
  - Foundation of the SNC in Doha: 11 November 2012
  - Foundation of the SIG in Istanbul: 18 March 2013
  - Relocation into Turkish‑occupied northern Syria: 24 August 2016
  - Creation of Syrian National Army: 30 December 2017
  - Operation Dawn of Freedom: 30 November – 12 December 2024
  - Union with the Syrian caretaker government: 30 January 2025
  - SNC disbanded: 12 February 2025
- Currency: Syrian pound, Turkish lira, US dollar
- Time zone: UTC+3 (AST)
- Website syriaig.net/ar/home
Preceded by
Syrian National Coalition
DAANES
Islamic State
Succeeded by
Syrian caretaker government

The Syrian Interim Government (Arabic: حكومة السورية المؤقتة, romanized: Ḥukūmat as-Sūriyya al-Muwaqqata) was a government-in-exile and later a quasi-state in Syria that existed during the Syrian civil war. It was formed on 18 March 2013 by the National Coalition of Syrian Revolutionary and Opposition Forces (Syrian National Coalition, SNC), an umbrella opposition group. First operating from Istanbul, the Syrian Interim Government constituted from 2016 a separate administration in the Turkish-controlled territories in northern Syria and had partial authority there. The interim government's headquarters in Syria were located in the city of Azaz in Aleppo Governorate. While responsible to the Syrian National Coalition, the SIG was closely aligned with Turkey. The SIG's armed forces were the SNA.

After the fall of the Assad regime in December 2024, the SIG coexisted for a short period of time with the Syrian caretaker government headed by Mohammed al-Bashir in Damascus, while the SNC expressed its support for the caretaker government and called for the formation of a government that would be "inclusive of everyone." On 30 January 2025, the SIG officially "placed itself at the disposal" of the caretaker government, which began deploying its forces across former SIG territory in early February 2025.

== History ==
At a conference held in Istanbul on 19 March 2013, the Syrian National Coalition (SNC) elected Ghassan Hitto as prime minister of the Syrian opposition's interim government. Hitto announced that a technical government would be formed led by 10 to 12 ministers, with the minister of defence to be chosen by the Free Syrian Army. At first, the SIG was "based in exile and lack[ed] an organizational base inside Syria." It was intended that the new ministries would not be placed in a single location but distributed in regions under the control of the Syrian opposition.

In July 2013, Hitto resigned from his post, having been unable to form a cabinet. He was replaced by "moderate Islamist" Ahmad Tu'mah, who formed a cabinet that included a Christian, a Kurd and a woman; Ahmad Ramadan of the SNC stated that the cabinet was appointed on a meritocratic basis. The Assyrian component of the National Coalition said that they were not given any attention in the selection of the cabinet. Its General Assembly has an administrative function. The first interim cabinet was dissolved in July 2014. A new cabinet was formed in October 2014.

The SIG has been the primary civilian authority throughout most of Syria's opposition-held areas. Its system of administrative local councils operate services such as schools and hospitals in these areas. In December 2015, the SIG founded the Free Aleppo University (FAU), as an alternative to government-run universities; an estimated 7,000 students were enrolled in FAU in early 2018, with campuses in opposition-held territory across five provinces. In January 2018, the SIG moved the University's administration from Idlib to the west Aleppo town of Bashqateen. In late September 2016, the Syrian interim government minister for local administration was among a dozen people killed by an ISIL suicide bomber in the southern city of Inkhil.

The interim government was based in Turkey and has received direct funding from the United States. In January 2015, the Syrian interim government received US$6 million from the United States, the first funding of this kind. The funds were to be used for reconstruction efforts and the strengthening of local government in opposition-held parts of Syria such as northern Aleppo and northwestern Idlib, with the interim government planning to expand into northern Latakia and northern Hama in the following months. By August 2017, the Syrian interim government stopped paying salaries to workers, and work within the interim government became voluntary work. As the Turkish occupation of northern Syria grew from 2016, the SIG moved into the Turkish-controlled territories and began to exert partial authority there, including providing documents to Syrian citizens.

By late 2017, the SIG presided over 12 provincial councils and over 400 elected local councils. It held elections across Idlib Governorate in 2017. It also operates a major border crossing between Syria and Turkey, which generates an estimated $1 million revenue each month. In opposition areas outside the Turkish-occupied ones, the SIG has been in conflict with the Islamist Syrian Salvation Government for control since September 2017.

On 30 December 2017, at least 30 factions operating under the banner of the Syrian Interim Government merged in a unified armed group after four months of preparations. Jawad Abu Hatab, the SIG's Prime Minister and Defence Minister, announced the formation of the Syrian National Army (SNA) after meeting with rebel commanders in the town of Azaz. The newly formed body claimed to have 22,000 fighters, many of them trained and equipped by Turkey. The National Front for Liberation was also aligned to the Syrian Interim Government, and eventually became a subgroup of the SNA.

In 2023, Syria Direct reported that while the Syrian National Coalition was officially a higher authority than the SIG, it was the Turkish-backed SIG that actually wielded power over it, as a sign that the SNC was now operating essentially under Turkish control. According to another report by Syria Direct, as of 2023 the SIG was still wholly dependent on Turkish support in the areas that it controlled nominally. Each Syrian local council in those areas was tied to a corresponding Turkish province. The councils' coordinators had to report to the Turkish governor who was to be consulted before making decisions on strategic matters. Syrian councils were freely elected but, once elected, had to work with Turkish governors to implement policies. In July 2024, riots erupted in SIG-held areas to protest Turkish policies and Turkey's attempts to normalize relations with the Assad regime.

In late 2024, the Syrian National Army participated in the surprise offensives that led to the fall of the Assad regime, while also capturing territories from the Kurdish-led Autonomous Administration of North and East Syria.

Abdurrahman Mustafa, head of the Syrian interim government, signed an order on 30 January 2025 to hand over all his powers and cadres to the Syrian caretaker government in Damascus. The statement was not published on its official account, but a report from the Enab Baladi said that a copy of the statement had been obtained from Yasser Haji, director of the interim government's foreign affairs and international cooperation department, and confirmed its authenticity. The SIG said: "We will provide our capabilities, cadres and expertise to the Syrian state to serve the project of building a new Syria."

The SNA began a process of integration into the new Syrian armed forces. On 3 February 2025, it was reported that two SNA leaders were appointed as division commanders in the armed forces by the caretaker government's defense ministry. On 5 and 6 February 2025, caretaker government forces were deployed across former SIG territories.

== Prime ministers ==
No.	Portrait	Name (Birth–Death)	Took office	Left office	Political party	Note(s)
—		Ghassan Hitto (born 1963); Acting Prime Minister	18 March 2013	14 September 2013	Independent	Failed to form a government; resigned on 8 July
1		Ahmad Tu'mah (born 1965)	14 September 2013	22 July 2014	Independent	—
1		Ahmad Tu'mah (born 1965)	14 October 2014	17 May 2016	Independent	Second term
2		Jawad Abu Hatab (born 1962)	17 May 2016	10 March 2019	Independent	—
3		Abdurrahman Mustafa (born 1964)	30 June 2019	30 January 2025	Syrian Turkmen Assembly	—

== List of ministers ==
Last ministers	Office	Since	Until
Akram Tomeh	Vice Prime Minister	12 July 2016	30 August 2019
Hassan Hamada	Minister of Defense	15 November 2021	30 January 2025
Jawad Abu Hatab	Minister of the Interior	12 July 2016	30 August 2019
Abdel Moneim Alhalabi	Minister of Finance	12 July 2016	30 January 2025
Mohammed Firas Aljundi	Minister of Health	12 July 2016	30 August 2019
Abdul Aziz Aldughem	Minister of Higher Education	12 July 2016	30 August 2019
Imad Barq	Minister of Education	12 July 2016	30 August 2019
Yaaqoub Alammar	Minister of Local Administration	12 July 2016	30 August 2019
Jamal Kallash	Minister of Agriculture	12 July 2016	30 August 2019
Abdullah Razzouk	Minister of Services	12 July 2016	30 August 2019

== See also ==
- Politics of Syria
- Syrian Salvation Government
- Syrian National Coalition
- Turkish occupation of northern Syria
