= Burhan Ghalioun =

Syrian political scientist, opposition figure

Burhan Ghalioun برهان غليون
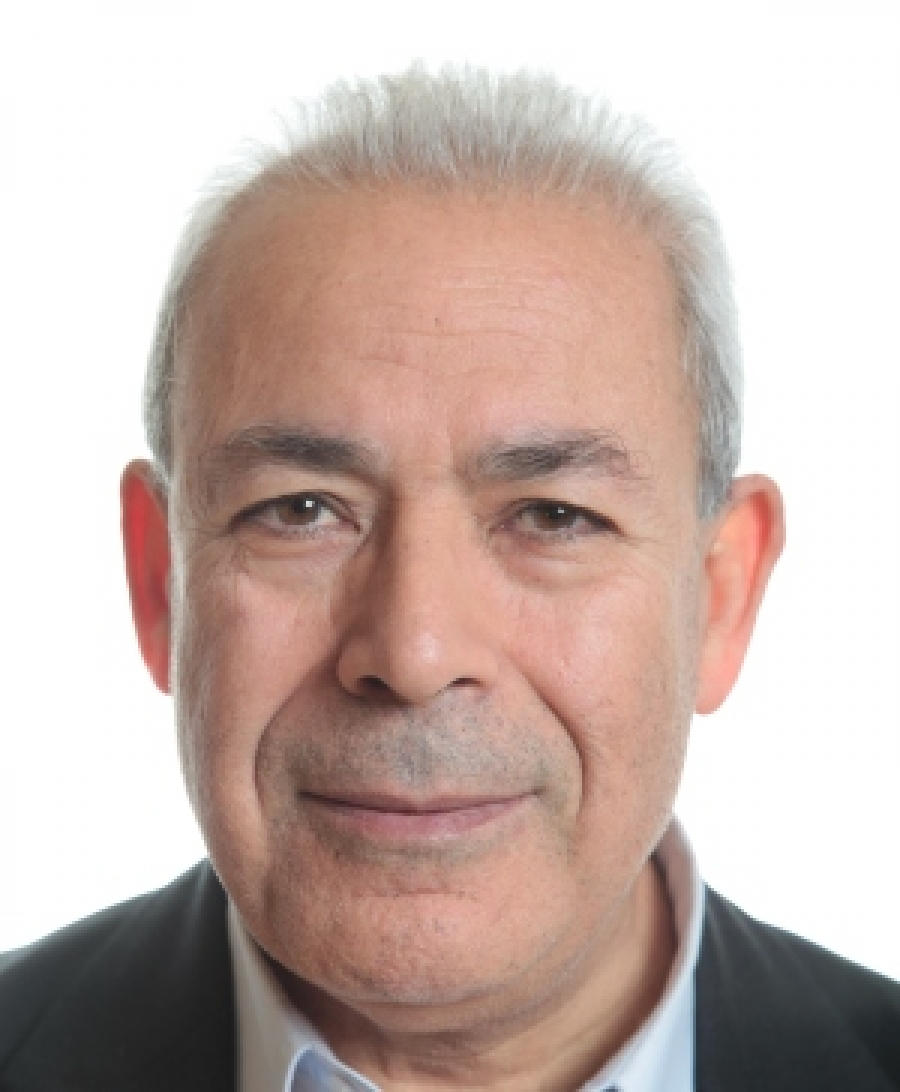

President of the Syrian National Council
- In office 29 August 2011 – 10 June 2012
- Deputy: Haitham al-Maleh
- Preceded by: Position established
- Succeeded by: Abdulbaset Sieda

Personal details
- Born: 11 February 1945 (age 81) Homs, Syria
- Education: Damascus University

Burhan Ghalioun (Arabic: برهان غليون, romanized: Burhān Ghalyūn; born 11 February 1945 in Homs, Syria) is a French-Syrian professor of sociology at the Université de Paris III Sorbonne University in Paris, and the first chairman of the Syrian National Council (SNC). He was named chairman on 29 August 2011. His chairmanship was criticized for his perceived closeness to the Muslim Brotherhood, his early reluctance to arm opposition forces, and what opponents called the autocratic nature of his leadership. On 17 May 2012, feeling he had become an increasingly divisive figure for the council, Ghalioun resigned.

== Early career ==
Born in Homs in 1945, Ghalioun is a Sunni Muslim. He studied sociology and philosophy at the University of Damascus. In 1969, he moved to Paris, where he received a PhD in social science from the University of Paris VIII and another in humanities from Sorbonne University. In the late 1970s, he made a name as an opponent of President Hafez al-Assad by publishing a pamphlet titled "A Manifesto for Democracy". Drawing on the tradition of the European Enlightenment, the pamphlet made the case that Arab states had become the enemies of their societies, and that democratic reform was needed to take back state power.

Though the pamphlet gave Ghalioun a reputation as a leading opposition figure, he avoided party politics throughout the 1980s. However, he remained a public critic of the Assad government and a supporter of the Palestinian cause. In 1983, he was one of the founders of the Arab Organization for Human Rights, and he also led the Syrian Cultural and Social Forum, an organization of anti-Assad Syrian expatriates.

== Role in Damascus Spring ==
At the beginning of Bashar al-Assad's rule, Syria saw what some considered a period of greater "political openness" known as the Damascus Spring. Ghalioun, from his home in Paris, began to visit Syria more frequently for the next 12 months, and became more active in Syrian politics. In 2001, he discussed a lecture with Jadaliyya: "The Ba'th authority was shocked that over 700 people attended my lecture, news of which spread by word of mouth with no advertisement or organization. They lost their minds; how could all these people come with no organization? Because when they host a lecture, maybe three people show up who are not Ba'thist, and they are there because of personal interests. This scared them, it made them feel there was a strong, deep wave that may become stronger, more developed, possibly to the point of no return. They decided this was a dangerous tidal wave, and they must oppress the Damascus Spring at any price. And that's what happened: arresting participants, closing the forums, tracking the intellectuals."

He soon after decided that the new "political openness" had come to an end later in 2001 and chose to stay in France, now his home country of 32 years, to concentrate on his academic work.

In 2005, Ghalioun returned to political activity in the period of the Damascus Declaration. He argued that Syrian opposition groups should avoid alliances with Western governments against the government, but rather work from within.

== Role in the Syrian uprising ==
When Syria saw the first popular protests in March 2011 as part of the broader Arab Spring, Ghalioun immediately supported the protesters in the media. He also began working to bring together opposition groups.

Following the Antalya Conference for Change in Syria in early June 2011, Ghalioun criticized the event as "serving foreign agendas," which prompted one of the organizers, Abdulrazak Eid, to accuse Ghalioun of attempting to appease the regime.

In August 2011, the Syrian National Council (SNC) was established as an umbrella group to unify the many factions opposed to Assad's government. Ghalioun was named its head and was viewed as a leader who could work with both Western governments and Syrian Islamists. However, his leadership was criticized from the start by some fellow opposition members, who felt he was "not up to the job". Others stated that he was too close to the Muslim Brotherhood and was attempting to monopolize power. Ghalioun initially opposed the militarization of the opposition, preferring to work to a negotiated solution to the crisis.

He was named for an additional three-month term in February 2012, a decision which caused several member organizations to resign from the council in protest. On May 15, his term was renewed for another three months. In an attempt to heal growing divisions in the SNC, Ghalioun announced for the first time his support for providing weapons to the Free Syrian Army. When the Local Coordination Committees threatened to leave the SNC, however, Ghalioun resigned two days later, stating that he did not wish to be "the candidate of division". His resignation was welcomed by some SNC members but criticized by others, who felt that resigning immediately following his re-election gave the SNC a further appearance of being in disarray. On 10 June, he was replaced by Kurdish activist Abdulbaset Sieda.

Ghalioun visited Syria on 19 June, crossing into the north of the country from Turkey and traveling incognito. He met with rebels and activists, and stated that he concluded from his visit that Assad had "lost control on the ground". The visit was his first since the beginning of the uprising.

== Political views ==
Ghalioun has generally avoided association with political movements such as Nasserism, Islamism, or Communism. He sees democracy as "a panacea for the Arab world" and a "historical necessity", arguing that Arab governments have failed to build successful nation states out of their nationalist movements, and that opposition to those governments must center on demands for democratic reforms.

In 2011, he stated his belief that given the Assad administration's persistent repressive policies and its "refusal to reach an understanding with its people", Syrians have only two options. They can either unite and cooperate to bring about "a pluralist, civil, democratic order in which all Syrian citizens are equal", or there will be "a certain slide into violence, anarchy, and destruction". He also stated that if the SNC took over Syria it would end the military relationship to Iran and cut off arms supplies to Hezbollah and Hamas.
