= Mouaffaq Nyrabia =

Syrian engineer (born 1949)

Mouaffaq Nyrabia موفق نيربية
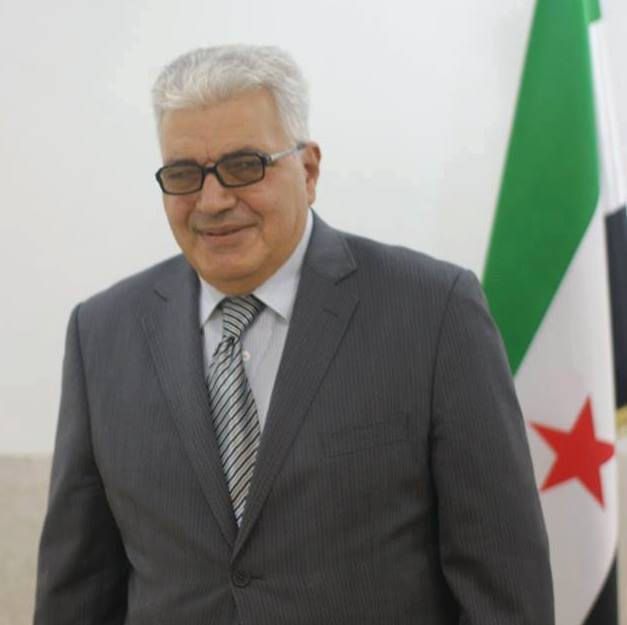
- Born: 1949 (age 76–77); Homs, Syria
- Citizenship: Syria
- Occupations: Politician and engineer
- Years active: 1970—present
- Spouse: Amal Mohammad
- Children: Orwa Nyrabia, Layla Nyrabia

Mouaffaq Nyrabia (Arabic: موفق نيربية; born 28 November 1949) is a Syrian dissident, politician, political writer and mechanical engineer, best known for his pivotal role in the creation of Damascus Declaration, a prominent Syrian Opposition structure until the Syrian Revolution erupted in March 2011. Since he left Syria, in early 2013, he has been an active member of the National Coalition for Syrian Revolutionary and Opposition Forces, a member of its executive board, representing the secular political current Muwatanah (Arabic for "Citizenship"). Nyrabia worked on founding a democratic bloc inside the Syrian Coalition and joined the similar attempts led by dissident writer and politician Michael Kilo. In June 2014, the democratic bloc, which became a major force inside the coalition, voted Nyrabia to be its candidate to preside over the coalition, after Ahmad Jarba, who is a member of the same bloc. However, in March 2016, Nyrabia was elected as First Vice President of the coalition.

== Biography ==
Nyrabia was born on November 28, 1949, in Hama.

He moved from Homs, where he did high school, to Damascus in 1969 to study mechanical engineering at Damascus University. He graduated in 1974 as a mechanical engineer. He wrote about the cultural experience of those years, post 6 Day War in 1967, for a Goethe Institute publication, where he considered it a crucial disillusionment: "We were totally convinced that winning the war would be easy for us, due to the propaganda our governments and political leaders had made".

He married Amal Mohammad, a civil engineer and also a leftist activist, from Latakia, in 1976, in Damascus, and they had their first child Orwa Nyrabia in 1977

He was detained in September 1980, by the Military Intelligence apparatus of Hafez al-Assad's government, and was released from prison in November 1985, without charges. His second child, Layla, was born in 1988 in Homs.

He lived with his family in Homs until 2007, when he was pursued by the government again, and moved to Damascus. Nyrabia left Syria for the first time to Germany, via Turkey, in February 2013

== Political career ==
In addition to a successful career as a senior mechanical engineer, managing major industrial projects in Syria, Nyrabia had a long political career, starting from being the head of the Students organization of Syria's non-soviet communist party, usually referred to as "The Political Bureau", led by veteran dissident Riad al-Turk, and one of the founding bodies of the National Democratic Rally, a prominent opposition constellation of the country in the 1970s and 80s. In the late 1970s, Nyrabia became the party's head for Homs and As-Suwayda.

Nyrabia started writing in leading regional newspaper al-Hayat in 1998, and later in Al-Jarida, his op-eds in both were among the most read in the country, providing analysis and views on Syrian political map and possibilities. His writings were thought to have leftist traits in philosophy, however, they were generally seen as promoting democracy and human rights more than any particular ideology. In the period known as Damascus Spring, Nyrabia was one of the initiators of the Statement of 99, a leading manifesto signed in 2000 by 99 leading Syrian intellectuals and opinion leaders.

In the period 2002 to 2004, Nyrabia worked on the development of the party he was a member of in the 1970s, known as the Political Bureau, into what is known today as Syrian Democratic People's Party, giving it a modernised approach towards democracy and social justice, before he resigned his position in the party, and worked independently on the creation of the Damascus Declaration national council; a convention of a wide array of Syrian Opposition forces, that took place in December 2007 in the home of known Syrian dissident Riad Seif in Damascus. Nyrabia was the president of the preparatory committee for the convention. Nyrabia was later on a member of the Central Committee of the Damascus Declaration, until he resigned his position in early 2013 in protest to the committee's objection to the establishing of the wider and more representative National Coalition for Syrian Revolutionary and Opposition Forces. In a February, 2015 a Princeton University, Princeton Interactive Crisis Simulation (PICSIM) paper, it was suggested that "his [Nyrabia's] ideas can be considered the structural basis for the revolution. His position is key to maintaining strong diplomatic connections with other nations if crises were to erupt".

Nyrabia served as a member of the executive board of the coalition for 9 months in 2014, and was appointed representative (acting ambassador) to Germany,; and then as representative of the coalition to the EU and the Benelux countries.

In June 2014 Nyrabia was voted by the Democratic Bloc in the Coalition as their main candidate for presidency of the coalition, However, he lost the election to Hadi Al Bahra, with a vote count of 62 to 41
