= Syrian opposition (disambiguation) =

Syrian opposition refers to groups opposing the Ba'athist Syrian government and former president Bashar al-Assad during the Syrian civil war. Jihadist groups such as the Islamic State are generally not included under that definition.

Syrian opposition may specifically refer to:

== Civil society ==
=== Before Syrian civil war ===
- Organizations founded abroad to oppose the Assad regime:
  - National Democratic Rally
  - Reform Party of Syria
  - Syrian Democratic People's Party
  - National Salvation Front in Syria
  - Movement for Justice and Development in Syria
  - National Alliance for the Liberation of Syria
- Signatories of the statement of 99 and the statement of 1000
- Platforms that emerged during the Damascus Spring
  - Riad Seif Forum
- Organizations associated with the Damascus Declaration
- Muslim Brotherhood in Syria, opposition to Syria since Hafez al-Assad

=== During Syrian civil war ===
- Syrian National Council, a major opposition coalition founded in 2011
- National Coalition of Syrian Revolutionary and Opposition Forces, or Syrian National Coalition (SNC), successor to the Syrian National Council founded in 2012
- Local Coordination Committees of Syria, groups formed in Syria during the early stages of the uprising
- National Coordination Committee for Democratic Change, an opposition coalition that favored negotiations with the regime
- Other groups:
  - Supreme Council of the Syrian Revolution
  - Syrian Revolution General Commission
  - Syrian Revolution Coordinators Union

== Others ==
- Syrian Negotiation Commission (known from 2015 to 2017 as the High Negotiations Committee) in the context of the Syrian peace negotiations
- Democratic Autonomous Administration of North and East Syria (Rojava), a de facto Kurdish-led autonomous region
  - Syrian Democratic Council, lawmaking body
  - Syrian Democratic Forces, military forces

== Political groups ==
=== Systemic opposition ===
- Popular Front for Change and Liberation, a coalition of Syrian political parties and the official political opposition within the People's Assembly of Syria during Bashar al-Assad's rule

=== Non-systemic opposition ===
- Syrian Salvation Government, affiliated with HTS
- Syrian Interim Government, affiliated with the SNC

== Armed factions ==
- Free Syrian Army, the main armed rebel faction during the early stages of the civil war
- Several Islamist groups:
  - Hay'at Tahrir al-Sham (HTS)
  - Ahrar al-Sham
  - Jaysh al-Islam
- Other armed factions in the Syrian civil war opposed to the Ba'athist regime during the civil war:
  - Military Operations Command (affiliated with HTS)
  - Syrian National Army (affiliated with the Syrian Interim Government)
  - Southern Front
  - Syrian Liberation Front
  - Syrian Free Army

== See also ==
- Syrian civil war, 2011-2024 multi-sided civil war in Syria
- Inter-rebel conflict during the Syrian civil war, conflict among factions of the Syrian opposition and Free Syrian Army throughout the Syrian Civil War
- Syrian Social Nationalist Party, a party in Lebanon, Syria, Jordan, Iraq and Palestine that advocates a Greater Syrian nation state
- Hizb ut-Tahrir, an international pan-Islamist and fundamentalist political organization
