= Human rights in Ba'athist Syria =

Human rights issues from 1963 to 2024

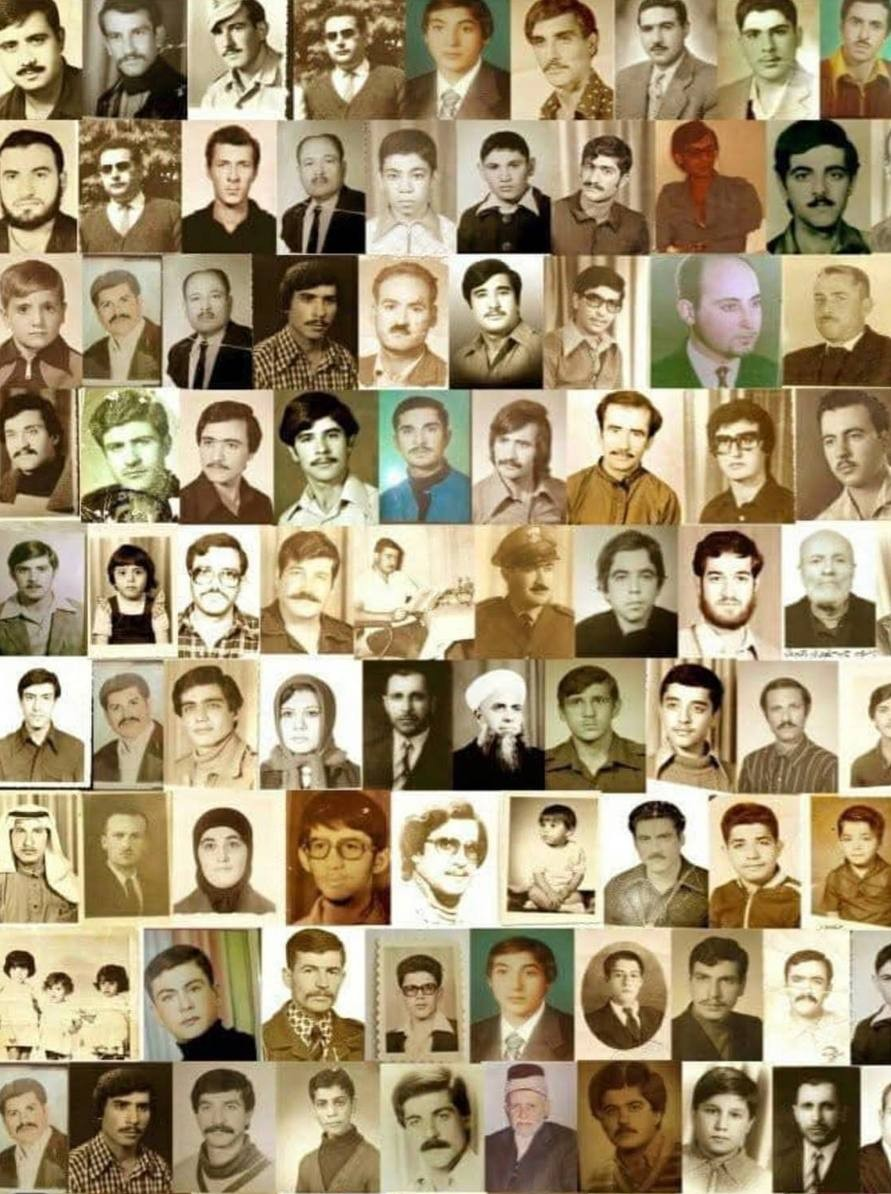
Photos of victims of the 1982 Hama massacre

Human rights in Ba'athist Syria were effectively non-existent. The government's human rights record was considered one of the worst in the world. As a result, Ba'athist Syria was globally condemned by prominent international organizations, including the United Nations, Human Rights Watch, Amnesty International, and the European Union. Civil liberties, political rights, freedom of speech and assembly were severely restricted under the neo-Ba'athist government of Bashar al-Assad, which was regarded as "one of the world's most repressive regimes". The 50th edition of Freedom in the World, the annual report published by Freedom House since 1973, designated Syria as "Worst of the Worst" among the "Not Free" countries. The report listed Syria as one of the two countries to get the lowest possible score (1/100). During the Ba'ath Party's rule, several repressive political laws were passed, such as Law No. 49, Revolution Protection Law, Economic Sanctions Law and Arab Socialist Ba'ath Party Security Law.

The 1963 coup d'état by the Military Committee of the Syrian Ba'ath party propelled the neo-Ba'athists into power, allowing them to establish a totalitarian state in Syria. Following a period of intra-party power-struggles that culminated in the 1970 coup, General Hafez al-Assad became the Syrian President; establishing a hereditary dictatorship of the Assad family. During the six decades of its rule, the security apparatus banned all social, political and economic groups independent of the Ba'ath party or the regime; ensuring that the state had total monopoly over all forms of organizations. A state of emergency was in effect from 1963 until April 2011, giving security forces sweeping powers of arbitrary arrests and detentions of civilians; including prisoners of conscience. From 1973 to 2012, Syria was a single-party state. While the 2012 Syrian constitution nominally affirmed the formation of political parties; registration process in practice was difficult and thoroughly scrutinized by the regime. Political activities independent of the Ba'ath were discouraged in regime-controlled territories and strictly monitored by the Mukhabarat.

There was no independent judiciary, as it was mandatory for all judges and prosecutors to be approved members of the Ba'ath party. The Ba'athist military forces had the power to arbitrarily arrest civilians and put them to trial. The authorities have been accused of harassing and imprisoning human rights activists and other critics of the government. Freedom of expression, association and assembly were strictly controlled, and ethnic minorities faced discrimination. Throughout the decades-long reign of Assad dynasty between 1970 and 2011; over 70,000 Syrians were subjected to forced disappearances, more than 40,000 were executed through extrajudicial killings and hundreds of thousands of civilians became displaced through deportations.

After an initial period of economic liberalization that failed to improve human rights in the early 2000s, Bashar al-Assad launched a string of crackdowns that imprisoned numerous intellectuals and cultural activists; thereby ending the Damascus Spring. At the onset of the Arab Spring in 2011, the country's human rights situation remained among the worst in the world; characterized by arbitrary arrests, mass surveillance by the dreaded secret police and systematic repression of ethnic minorities, such as the Kurds. The government was guilty of crimes against humanity based on witness accounts of deaths in custody including extrajudicial executions, (Note: Sources:) torture, (Note: Sources:) rape, (Note: Sources:) arbitrary detentions, ethnic cleansing, genocides, massacres, state terrorism and forced disappearances during the crackdown against the 2011 Syrian Revolution and the ensuing Civil War. The government had also conducted numerous chemical attacks against its own civilians. (Note: Sources:)

== History of human rights ==
The coup d'état in 1963 staged by the Military Committee of the Syrian Ba'ath party overthrew the Second Syrian Republic headed by President Nazim al-Qudsi, ushering in decades-long Baathist rule. The new regime implemented social engineering policies such as large-scale confiscation of properties, state directed re-distribution of lands and wealth, massive censorship, elimination of independent publishing centres, nationalization of banks, education system and industries. A state of emergency was declared which abolished all other political parties and bestowed sweeping powers upon the military; effectively ruling the country as police state. Purges were carried out throughout the civil society, bureaucracy; and the army was packed with party loyalists. Syrian Ba'athists were highly influenced by Akram Hawrani's Arab Socialist party which adhered to Marxism.

In March 1964, Jews were banned from traveling more than 5 kilometres (3 mi) from their hometowns.(citation needed, the reference does not contain any information proving this ) Jews were not allowed to work for the government or banks, could not acquire drivers' licenses, and were banned from purchasing property. Although Jews were prohibited from leaving the country, they were sometimes allowed to travel abroad for commercial or medical reasons. Any Jew granted clearance to leave the country had to leave behind a bond of $300–$1,000 and family members to be used as hostages to ensure they returned. An airport road was paved over the Jewish cemetery in Damascus, and Jewish schools were closed and handed over to Muslims. The Jewish Quarter of Damascus was under constant surveillance by the secret police, who were present at synagogue services, weddings, bar mitzvahs, and other Jewish gatherings. The secret police closely monitored contact between Syrian Jews and foreigners and kept a file on every member of the Jewish community. Jews also had their phones tapped and their mail read by the secret police. After Israel's victory in the 1967 Six-Day War, restrictions were further tightened, and 57 Jews in Qamishli may have been killed in a pogrom. The communities of Damascus, Aleppo, and Qamishli were under house arrest for eight months following the war. Many Jewish workers were laid off following the Six-Day War.

After purging rival Baathist factions through a coup in 1970, Hafez al-Assad established total dominance over the Ba'ath party and established a dictatorship centered around his personality cult. Structure of Assad's police state revolved around the Ba'ath party organization, Syrian military establishment packed with Ba'athist elites and Assad family's Alawite loyalists. Hafez ruled Syria for three decades, deploying repressive measures ranging from censorship to violent methods of state terror such as mass murders, deportations and practices such as torture, which were unleashed collectively upon the civilian population. SS-Haupsturmfuhrer Alois Brunner, who played a significant role in the implementation of the Holocaust as the right-hand man of Adolf Eichmann, assisted al-Assad in organizing the Ba'athist secret police and trained them on Nazi Germany's torture practices. Such practices remained in use by 2021.

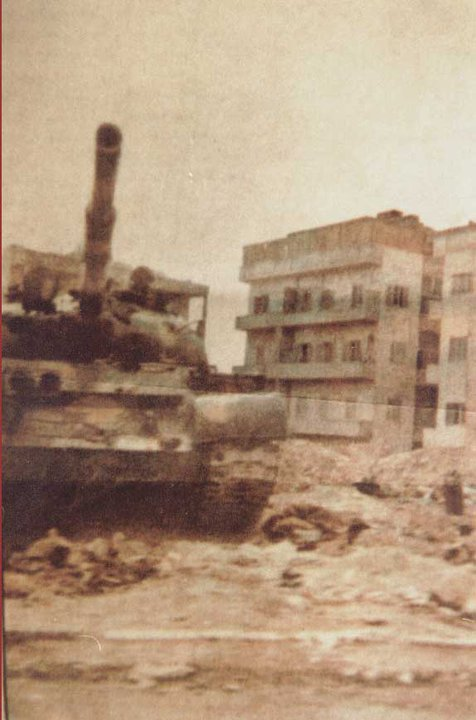
A Ba'athist Syrian army tank rolls over the ruins of the city suburbs shortly after the 1982 Hama massacre, which killed an estimated 40,000 civilians

In 1982, Hafez al-Assad responded to an insurrection led by the Muslim Brotherhood in the city of Hama by sending paramilitary forces that indiscriminately killed between 40,000 and 55,000 civilians including children, women, and the elderly during the Hama massacre. State-violence perpetrated by Assad's reign have targeted women extensively, subjecting them to discrimination and gender-based violence. Between 1980 and 2000, more than 17,000 Syrian civilians were subjected to forced disappearance from the Ba'athist regime. During Baathist occupation of Lebanon, numerous Lebanese, Palestinian and other Arab civilians went missing. More than 35 torture techniques were reported to be employed in Syrian prisons and military detention centres during this time. A 1983 report published by Amnesty International revealed that Assad regime routinely committed mass-executions of alleged dissidents and engaged in the extensive torture of prisoners of conscience. Various torture methods in Syrian prisons include electrocutions, immolation, sexual violence, castration, etc.

In 2000, Bashar al-Assad inherited the totalitarian system of Ba'athist Syria following the death of his father. His regime was characterized by even more systemic violence and repression than that of Hafez al-Assad. This has been widely attributed to Bashar's inexperience in security and political affairs, in addition to personal insecurities regarding the survival of his family regime. 2006 Freedom House report listed Syria amongst the worst countries to restrict civil liberties and political freedoms; giving it the lowest possible scores in both measures. In 2023, Freedom House rated people's access to political rights in Syria as the lowest on its Freedom in the World annual report on 210 countries. Syria ranked "-3" in political rights – lower than its scale of 1 to 7, alongside South Sudan and Western Sahara – and Syria was given a rating of "Not Free." Since 2022, Syria has the lowest ranked country in report.

According to the 2008 report on human rights by the U.S. State Department, the Syrian government's "respect for human rights worsened". Members of the security forces arrested and detained individuals without providing just cause, often held prisoners in "lengthy pretrial and incommunicado detention", and "tortured and physically abused prisoners and detainees". The government imposed significant restrictions on freedom of speech, press, assembly, and association, amid an atmosphere of government corruption. According to Arab Press Network, "despite a generally repressive political climate", there were "signs of positive change," during the 2007 elections. According to a 2008 report by Reporters without Borders, "Journalists have to tightly censor themselves for fear of being thrown into Adra Prison."

In 2009 Syria was included in Freedom House's "Worst of the Worst" section and given a rating of 7 for Political Rights: and 6 for Civil Liberties. According to Human Rights Watch, as of 2009 Syria's poor human rights situation had "deteriorated further". Authorities arrested political and human rights activists, censored websites, detained bloggers, and imposed travel bans. Syria's multiple security agencies continue to detain people without arrest warrants. No political parties were licensed and emergency rule, imposed in 1963, remained in effect. Various torture techniques deployed in Syrian detention centres and prisons include routine beatings, rapes, sexual violence, "Bisat al-rih" (flying carpet), etc.

Before the outbreak of Syrian revolution in 2011, Ba'athist Syria's human rights situation was regarded as among the worst in the world. Ba'athist military apparatus arbitrarily arrested numerous civilians, tortured dissidents and violently persecuted Syrian Kurds. The Syrian police continued to arrest journalists, target human rights activists, censor websites, ban media outlets, detain bloggers, and impose travel bans. Arbitrary detentions, torture, and forced disappearances were widespread. Kurdish dissidents and political activists were regularly arrested and imprisoned. Expressions of Kurdish identity were banned, with Kurds being systematically discriminated and treated as "second-class citizens" in Ba'athist Syria.

The scale of the brutal violence and state terrorism unleashed by the Assad regime and his foreign backers across the country after the eruption of the 2011 Syrian revolution was unprecedented, far outstripping the actions of other Arab autocrats who repressed the Arab Spring. It even exceeded the brutal violence unleashed by Hafez al-Assad during the Hama Massacre. By pursuing scorched-earth policies to crush the armed resistance, Bashar had destroyed majority of Syria's civilian, cultural and economic infrastructure. Unlike his father, Bashar killed far more Syrian civilians and has also lost significant amount of his political independence to foreign actors like Russia and Iran.

In April 2017, the U.S. Navy carried out a missile attack against a Syrian air base which had been used to conduct a chemical weapons attack on Syrian civilians. This attack is also known as the 2017 Shayrat missile strike. In 2018, coalition forces including United States, France, and the United Kingdom also carried out a series of military strikes in Syria.

== Judicial process ==
Ba'athist Syria had a long history of arbitrary arrest, unfair trials and prolonged detention of suspects. Thousands of political prisoners remain in detention, with many belonging to the banned Muslim Brotherhood and the Communist Party. Since June 2000, more than 700 long-term political prisoners have been freed by President al-Assad, though an estimated 4,000 are reportedly still imprisoned. Information regarding those detained in relation to political or security-related charges is not divulged by the authorities. The government has not acknowledged responsibility for around 17,000 Lebanese citizens and Palestinians who "disappeared" in Lebanon in the 1980s and early 1990s and are thought to be imprisoned in Syria. In 2009, hundreds of people were arrested and imprisoned for political reasons. Military police were reported to have killed at least 17 detainees. Human rights activists are continually targeted and imprisoned by the government.

On 18 September 2020, Netherlands demanded that the Syrian president Bashar al-Assad be held accountable for the war crimes and crimes against humanity committed during the civilian war. The Dutch officials sent a notice to the Syrian regime on the legal actions to be taken and submitted a case at the International Court of Justice on the Syrian government's failure to negotiate under the UN framework.

== Prisoners of conscience ==
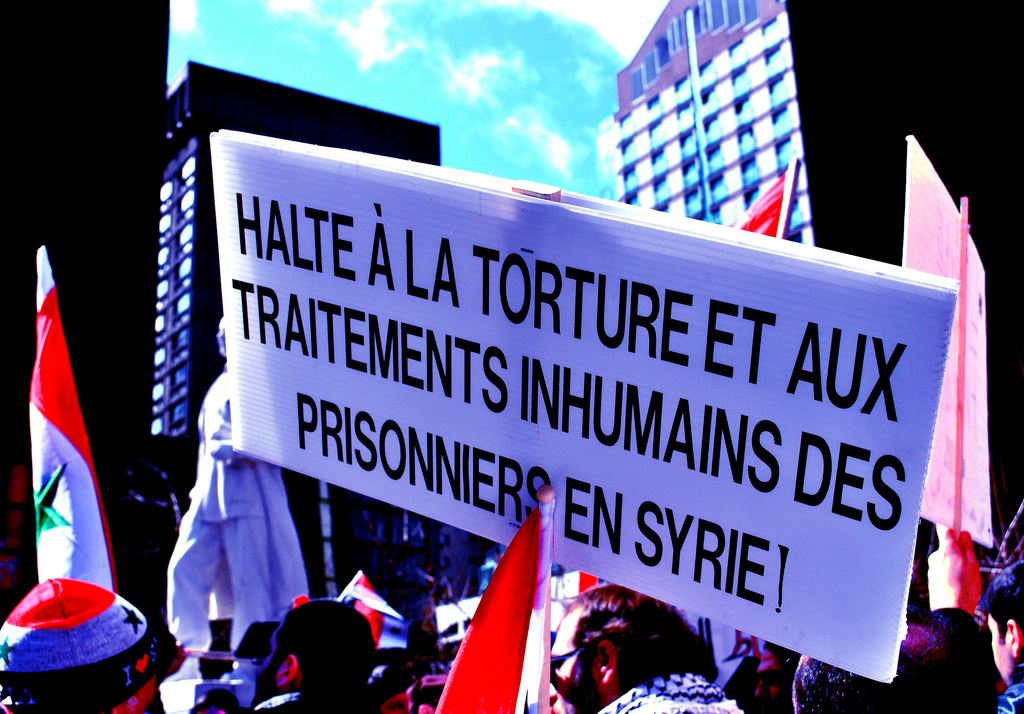
Demonstration in Montreal in solidarity with the people of Syria. The sign reads: "Stop torture and inhumane treatment of prisoners in Syria!"

Among the scores of prisoners of conscience arrested in 2009, and hundreds of political prisoners already in prison, some of the more prominent prisoners were:

- Kamal al-Labwani, a prisoner of conscience who had three years added to his 12-year sentence for allegedly "broadcasting false or exaggerated news which could affect the morale of the country", on account of remarks he was alleged to have made in his prison cell.
- Nabil Khlioui, an alleged Islamist from Deir ez-Zor, who with at least 10 other Islamists, most are presumed to be from Deir al-Zour, remained in incommunicado detention without charge or trial at the end of 2009.
- Mashaal Tammo, the killed spokesperson for the unauthorized Kurdish Future Current group, who was 'held incommunicado for 12 days and charged with "aiming to provoke civil war or sectarian fighting", "conspiracy" and three other charges commonly brought against Kurdish activists, charges that could lead to the death penalty.
- Twelve leaders of a prominent gathering of opposition groups, the Damascus Declaration, continue to serve 30-month prison terms. Among those detained is Riad Seif, 62, a former member of parliament who is in poor health.
- Habib Saleh was sentenced to three years in jail for "spreading false information" and "weakening national sentiment" in the form of writing articles criticizing the government and defending opposition figure Riad al-Turk.
- One released prisoner was Aref Dalila. He had served seven of the ten years in his prison sentence, much of it in solitary confinement and in increasingly poor health, for his involvement in the so-called "Damascus Spring" before being released by a presidential pardon.
- In June 2010, Mohannad al-Hassani, head of the Syrian Organisation for Human Rights (Swasiya) and winner of the 2010 Martin Ennals Award for Human Rights Defenders, was convicted of "weakening national morale" and "conveying within Syria false news that could debilitate the morale of the nation." He was sentenced to three years in prison.

That night, Hamada woke up needing to use the bathroom. A guard hit him all the way to the toilets, but he went in alone. When he opened the first stall, he saw a pile of corpses, battered and blue. He found two more in the second stall, emaciated and missing their eyes. There was another body by the sink. Hamada came out in panic, but the guard sent him back in and told him, "Pee on top of the bodies." He couldn't. He started to feel that he was losing his grip on reality. According to the U.N. inquiry, dead detainees were "kept in the toilets" at multiple security branches in Damascus.

— Description of mass-killings and torture of inmates in Hospital 606, a Syrian military hospital near Mezzeh

Sednaya Prison alone housed more than 600 political prisoners. The authorities have kept many for years behind bars, often well past their legal sentence. Mass graves across the country were also discovered by forces from the Syrian transitional government after the fall of the Assad regime in December 2024.

In a 2006 report, Human Rights Watch reported on the continued detention of "thousands" of political prisoners in Syria, "many of them members of the banned Muslim Brotherhood and the Communist Party." According to the Syrian Human Rights Committee that there were 4,000 political prisoners held in Syrian jails in 2006.

== Torture ==
SS-Haupsturmfuhrer Alois Brunner, the right-hand man of Adolf Eichmann, assisted Hafez al-Assad in organizing the Ba'athist secret police and trained them on Nazi torture practices, under secret asylum in Syria.

August 2016, Amnesty International released a report tackling the issue of torture and ill-treatment in Syrian government prisons which amount to crimes against humanity. Since the crisis began in March 2011, the international organization estimated that 17,723 people have died in custody in Syria – an average rate of more than 300 deaths each month. According to the report, governmental forces have used torture to scare the opponents. But today, they use it as a part of systematic attack against opposition members. According to testimonies of some survivors, detainees were subjected to numerous kind of torture aiming at dehumanizing them, and in many cases killing them. Amnesty international said that those, who are responsible for these atrocities, must be brought to justice.

In Sednaya Prison alone, up to 13,000 detainees were executed extrajudicially in secret between 2011 and 2015, mostly through mass-hangings. This was part of Assad's push to eliminate all dissent to his rule. On 6 July 2020, families of detainees in Syrian government prisons found the pictures of their dead relatives in the media graphics of a forensic police photographer-turned-whistleblower, codenamed, Caesar. The photos are among tens of thousands of images of torture victims, smuggled out of Syria in 2013. Numerous European citizens were also revealed to be among the torture victims.

Chilling revelations of torture, rape, massacres, extermination were revealed through the 2014 Caesar Report, which documented photographic evidences of industrial-scale atrocities occurring in Syrian military prisons. The report documented a total of 55,000 digital images of tortured or dismembered human bodies of around 11,000 detainees. Describing some of the torture techniques unleashed on Syrians held captive in military prisons, the military defector Caesar states:

"It was very clear that they were tortured, not tortured for a day or two, tortured for many, many long months. They were emaciated bodies, purely skeletons. There were people, most of them had their eyes gouged out. There was electrocution, you could tell by the dark spots on their body that was used there. There was utilization of knives and also big cables and belts that was used to beat them. And so, we could see every type of torture on the bodies of these individuals. 'Every type of torture,' but the depravity of the gouged eyes leaves to the imagination how maiming was calculated to coerce information. By 2013, the bodies overflowed the morgues and spilled across a parking garage at a military hospital."

In 2023, Canada and Netherlands jointly filed a lawsuit against the Assad regime at the International Court of Justice (ICJ); charging Assad with ordering torture, rapes and other de-humanising tactics on hundreds of thousands of detainees in Syrian prison networks, including women and children. The joint petition denounced the Ba'athist regime for inflicting "unimaginable physical and mental pain and suffering" as a deliberate strategy to collectively punish the Syrian population. In a separate statement, Dutch Foreign Ministry accused Bashar al-Assad of committing severe human rights violations, war crimes and inhumane tactics against the Syrian people "on a grand scale". The joint proceedings were after repeated Russian vetoes in the UN Security Council that blocked efforts to prosecute Bashar al-Assad over war crimes in International Criminal Court.

In September 2026, former Adra Prison director Samir Alsheikh was sentenced to 60 years in federal prison in the United States. He was previously convicted in March 2026 of torture and conspiracy to commit torture while he headed the prison from 2005 to 2008.

== Freedom of religion ==
The Constitution provides for freedom of religion. However, the Government restricts this right. While there is no official state religion, the Constitution requires that the president be Muslim and stipulates that Islamic jurisprudence, an expansion of Sharia Islamic law, is a principal source of legislation. According to the U.S. Department of State's "International Religious Freedom Report 2007", the Constitution provides for freedom of faith and religious practice, provided that the religious rites do not disturb the public order. According to the report, the Syrian Government monitored the activities of all groups, including religious groups, discouraged proselytism, which it deemed a threat to relations among religious groups. The report said that the Government discriminated against the Jehovah's Witnesses and that there were occasional reports of minor tensions between religious groups, some attributable to economic rivalries rather than religious affiliation. There is some concern among religious minorities that democratic reforms will result in oppression of religious minorities by Islamist movements that are now repressed.

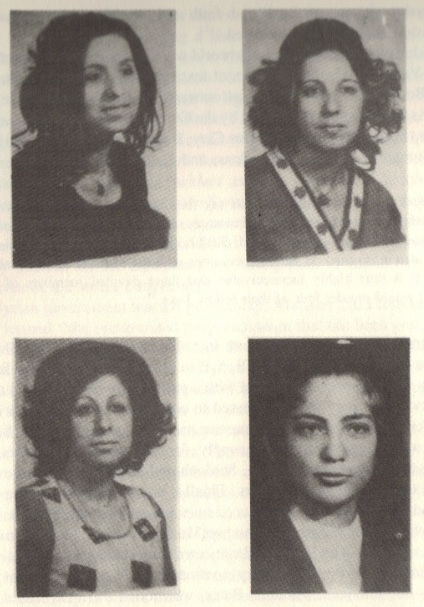
The Zeibak sisters: Four Syrian-Jewish girls (three sisters and their cousin) who were raped, killed, and mutilated while trying to flee to Israel in 1974

On 14 April 1974, four Jewish girls were raped, murdered and mutilated after attempting to flee to Israel. Their bodies were discovered by border police in a cave in the Zabdani Mountains northwest of Damascus along with the remains of two Jewish boys, Natan Shaya, 18 and Kassem Abadi 20, victims of an earlier massacre. Syrian authorities deposited the bodies of all six in sacks before the homes of their parents in the Jewish quarter of Damascus.

Syrian Sunnis were subject to severe and brutal discrimination from the Alawite-dominated Baathist apparatus; since the regime elites associated them with the Syrian opposition. As a result, Syria's Sunni community has suffered the vast majority of the brutalities and war crimes perpetrated by the Ba'athist regime during the Syrian Civil War.

== Women's rights ==
The Ba'athist regime in Syria discriminated against women through administrative measures that silenced their voices and through deploying political violence disproportionately against women. Sexual violence has long been a strategy of the regime to enforce the compliance of the populace. During the Syrian civil war, mass-rapes have been weaponized as a large-scale war-tactic by the Assad regime and the Ba'athist militant forces across Syria. Sexual violence against women on a political and sectarian basis has been described as a fundamental pillar of the regime's military strategy. Anti-Sunni Shabiha and other pro-Assad death squads carry out this policy on a sectarian basis, against Sunni women and girls. Many women suspected of pro-opposition sympathies are rounded up by Ba'athist paramilitaries and sexually assaulted in government detention centres and military prisons. Rural and poor women get disproportionately raped, assaulted, beaten and tortured in military prisons. Several women get abducted by dreaded Mukhabarat and raped in the offices of the secret police. According to many survivors, they can't return to their society without justice against the perpetrators.

== LGBT rights ==
Article 520 of the penal code of 1949, prohibits having homosexual relations, i.e. "carnal relations against the order of nature", and provides for up to three-years imprisonment.

In 2010 the Public Security Police began a crackdown that led to the arrest of over 25 men. The men were charged with various crimes ranging from homosexual acts and illegal drug use, to encouraging homosexual behavior and organizing obscene parties.

== Freedom of movement ==
Syrians can not leave the country without an "exit visa" granted by the authorities. Article 13 of the Universal Declaration of Human Rights provides for the human right of Freedom of Movement as such "(1) Everyone has the right to freedom of movement and residence within the borders of each state. (2) Everyone has the right to leave any country, including his own, and return to his country." Bans have been said to have increased significantly since 2006, though exact statistics are hard to come by as secret security agencies are commonly the ones issuing the bans. The Syrian Constitution, in Article 38(3), allows freedom of movement "within the territories of the state unless restricted by a judicial decision or by the implementation of laws of public health and safety."

After winning the 2007 presidential election in Syria with 99.82% of the declared votes, Bashar al-Assad implemented numerous measures that further intensified political and cultural repression in Syria. Assad government expanded travel bans against numerous dissidents, intellectuals, authors and artists living in Syria; preventing them and their families from travelling abroad. In 2010, The Economist newspaper described Syrian government as "the worst offender among Arab states", that engaged in imposing travel bans and restricted free movement of people. More than 400 individuals in Syria were restricted by Assad regime's travel bans in 2010. During this period, the Assad government arrested numerous journalists and shut down independent press centres, in addition to tightening its censorship of the Internet.

From 2011 to 2015, the last four years of the Syrian war, the freedom of movement has been most widely restricted in certain areas and on certain individuals. Restrictions vary between regions, partly because of continuous fighting in certain areas. In rebel held areas there are severe restrictions on the movement of government supporters (or people thought to be government supporters). Foreign diplomats are unable to visit a majority of Syria, and are often not allowed outside of Damascus (Syrian capital).

In the areas of Jindires in Afrin, and Ras al Ayn, curfews were executed in 2012 and 2013 as rebel groups put in place a curfew of 5 pm, after which nobody could be seen in public. Then in December 2014, a travel ban was announced on Syrian men aged 18 to 42 (military age). The memorandum supposedly states that all Syrian males must have special permission to leave the country, obtained from army officials.

An example of an individual travel ban is Louay Hussein, president of an opposition group in Syria (Building the Syrian State, or the BSS party), was unable to attend peace talks in Moscow in April 2015 because the government refused to rid of his lifelong travel ban, however on 26 April 2015 Hussein managed to evade his ban and flee to Spain. Also Syrian human rights defenders are having their movement restrained by being held in arbitrary arrest. The human rights defenders Mazen Darwish, Hani Al-Zitani, and Hussein Gharir were arrested in February 2012 for 'publicizing terrorist acts'. The United Nations General Assembly has repeatedly called for their release.

Al-Furat University in the city of Deir ez-Zor has been facing movement restrictions by ISIS recently. In January 2015 circulars were issued to ISIS checkpoints in the area to scrutinize all university students passing. To encourage students to abandon their studies and join the ranks of ISIS, the rebels have been restricting the students from traveling between government areas and ISIS-held areas, preventing many students from entering or exiting the university grounds.

Further from this, there are certain restrictions on movement placed on Women, for example, Syrian law now allows males to place restrictions on certain female relatives. Women over the age of 18 are entitled to travel outside of Syria, however, a woman's husband may file a request for his wife to be banned from leaving the country. From July 2013, in certain villages in Syria (namely Mosul, Raqqu and Deir el-Zour), ISIS no longer allow women to appear in public alone, they must be accompanied by a male relative/guardian known as a mahram. Security checkpoints in civilian areas set up by the government and by ISIS have allowed them to monitor these restrictions. With the males of Syria often being involved in the fighting, no matter which side, this is leaving many Syrian women at home alone with the children, stranded and unable to leave to purchase food and supplies. Further, women in Tel Abyad and Idlib city have been banned from driving by ISIS and Jabhat al-Nursa.

Other countries have begun closing their borders to Syrian refugees. On 7 October 2013, Turkey built a two-meter wall on the Syrian border in the Nusaybin district where there was frequent fighting with the rebels. Then on 9 March Turkey closed a further two of its border crossings from Syria, Oncupinar and Cilvegozu, in response to the escalating violence and worries of a terrorist plot. Up until this date Turkey had accepted nearly 2 million Syrian refugees. Aid trucks are still welcome to cross the border, but it is strictly closed to individuals.

The Ba'athist regime pursued practice of issuing exit visas with strict requirements. It also closed the Damascus airport frequently because of growing violence. Bans on travel were frequently used against human rights activists and their associates, often these people would not learn about their travel ban until they were prevented leaving the country. Usually no explanations are given for these travel restrictions. The government often bans members of the opposition and their families from traveling abroad, and they are targeted if they attempt to, causing opposition families to fear to attempt to leave Syria for fear of being attacked at the airport or border crossing. Though this action is illegal under international law, Syrian courts have been known to decline to interfere in matters of national security.

Article 38(1) of Ba'athist Syria's constitution stated that "no citizen may be deported from the country, or prevented from returning to it". This, along with Article 13 of the Universal Declaration of Human Rights creates a general legal right to travel internationally. As well as preventing citizens from leaving Syria, there have also been many instances of citizens being prevented from returning to Syria, whether they left illegally or not. A positive step in regards to this was taken on 28 April 2015, when it was announced by Syrian authorities that citizens who had previously fled the war would be able to re-attain passports without a review by the intelligence service, or going through the Department of emigration and passports. These citizens had fled the country illegally and either not taken their passports, or lost them.

Human Rights Watch reported in October 2021 that refugees who went back to Syria by their own choice, "suffered severe human rights abuses and persecution at the hands of Syrian government and affiliated militias, including torture, extra-judicial killings, and kidnappings."

== Freedom of speech and the media ==
Although the number of local news media outlets had increased in the 2000s, the Ba'ath Party continued to maintain its tight control and censorship of the press. Journalists and bloggers have been arrested and tried. In 2009, the committee to Protect Journalists named Syria number three in a list of the ten worst countries in which to be a blogger, given the arrests, harassment, and restrictions which online writers in Syria faced.

Internet censorship in Ba'athist Syria was extensive. The Ba'athist government banned websites over political reasons and arrests people accessing them. Internet cafes are required to record all the comments users post on chat forums. Websites such as Wikipedia Arabic, YouTube and Facebook were blocked from 2008 to 2011. Filtering and blocking was found to be pervasive in the political and Internet tools areas, and selective in the social and conflict/security areas by the OpenNet Initiative in August 2009. Syria has been on Reporters Without Borders' Enemy of the Internet list since 2006 when the list was established.

In addition to filtering a wide range of Web content, the Ba'athist Syrian government monitored Internet use very closely and detained citizens "for expressing their opinions or reporting information online." Vague and broadly worded laws invite government abuse and have prompted Internet users to engage in self-censorship to avoid the state's ambiguous grounds for arrest.

The Syrian Centre for Media and Free Expression was closed by the Ba'athist government in September 2009. It was the country's only NGO specializing in media issues, Internet access, and media monitoring during election campaigns. It had operated without government approval, and had monitored violations of journalists' rights and had taken up the cause of the ban on the dissemination of many newspapers and magazines.

Ba'athist Syrian security forces arrested and beat up protestors on 15 June 2020. The protest started on 7 June 2020, in front of the governorate center against government's failure of handling economic downfall, deteriorating living conditions and corruption. HRW appealed the Syrian authority to release the peacefully protesting detainees. Pro-regime journalists who were allowed to report within the country were arrested by security forces over social media posts or ambiguous charges like being "out of line".

== Discrimination against ethnic minorities ==
Non-Arab ethnic groups in Syrian society were heavily marginalized in Ba'athist Syria. Ethnic minority groups in Syria like the Kurds, Turkmen, Circassians, Chechens, etc. were systematically persecuted and racially discriminated under Ba'athist state practices. Ba'ath party's front organizations such as the "Ba'ath Vanguard" and "Shabibat al-Thawra" imposed a racially discriminatory Arab nationalist ideology through Syrian state educational institutions. Languages other than Arabic were not recognized in the Ba'athist constitutions. The 2012 constitution pushed by Bashar al-Assad, which was widely criticized by Syrian opposition and civil society activists, further entrenched the discriminatory policies of the Ba'athist system.

Syrian Kurds, in particular, were heavily brutalized and systemically targeted by the state apparatus. During the 1970s, the Hafez al-Assad launched the Ba'ath party's ethnic cleansing policy of Arab Belt project along north-eastern Syria, seizing lands owned by Kurdish families and forcibly displacing them. Hundreds of thousands of Kurds were stripped of citizenship, and several Kurdish localities were Arabized. Assad regime also banned the speaking of Kurdish language in workplaces and public events, and launched crackdowns against those who taught the Kurdish language privately. Kurdish tutors were forcibly disappeared or subjected to prolonged imprisonments under charges of fomenting "separatism", treason, and undermining the stability of the Ba'athist state. During the 2000s, the Assad regime imposed further discriminatory policies that prevented Kurds from owning property.

== Mass surveillance ==
The Ba'athist regime ruled Syria as a totalitarian surveillance state and policed every aspect of Syrian society for decades. The commanders of the government's security forces – which consisted of the Syrian Arab Army, secret police, and Ba'athist paramilitaries – directly implemented the executive functions of the Syrian state with scant regard for due process and the rule of law. The security services had shut down civil society organizations, curtailed freedom of movement within the country and banned non-Ba'athist political literature and symbols. During Ba'athist rule, the militarization of Syrian society intensified. The number of personnel in the Syrian military and various intelligence entities expanded drastically from 65,000 in 1965 to 530,000 in 1991; and surpassed 700,000 in 2004.

The Ba'athist secret police consisted of four wings: the general intelligence and the political security directorates, which were supervised by the Syrian Ministry of Interior, as well as the military intelligence and the air force intelligence directorates, which were supervised by the Syrian Ministry of Defence. The four directorates were directly controlled by the National Security Bureau of the Arab Socialist Ba'ath Party, and the heads of the four branches reported directly to the Syrian president, who was also the secretary general of the Ba'ath Party. The surveillance system of the Mukhabarat was pervasive, and over 65,000 full-time officers were estimated to be working in its various branches during the 2000s. In addition, there were hundreds of thousands of part-time employees and informers in various Syrian intelligence departments. According to estimates, there was one member of various branches of the Ba'athist secret police for every 158 citizens, which was said to be one of the largest ratios in the world.

The general intelligence, political security, and military intelligence divisions of the Ba'athist secret police had several branches in all governorates controlled by the Assad regime, where they were all headquartered in Damascus. With state impunity granted by the Assad regime, officers of the Mukhabarat wielded pervasive influence over local bodies, civil associations and bureaucracy, where they played a major role in shaping Ba'athist administrative decisions. Additionally, intense factional rivalries and power struggles existed among various branches of the secret police. Several academics have described the military, bureaucratic, and secret police apparatus of the Ba'athist state as constituting a pyramidal socio-political structure with an Orwellian surveillance system designed to neutralize independent civic activities and political dissent from its very onset.

During Ba'athist rule, Syria was one of the five countries listed on Reporters Without Borders' list of "State Enemies of the Internet" in March 2013, which was a list of countries ruled by governments that perpetrate pervasive surveillance of news providers that resulted in harsh restrictions on access to information and personal lives. The Assad regime had intensified its web censorship and cyber-monitoring during the course of the Syrian civil war and its cyber forces engaged in several social engineering techniques and surveillance measures such as phishing, malware attacks and the interception of Skype calls.

== Syrian civil war ==
During the Syrian civil war, a UN report described actions by the security forces as being "gross violations of human rights". The UN report documented shooting recruits that refused to fire into peaceful crowds without warning, brutal interrogations including elements of sexual abuse of men and gang rape of young boys, staking out hospitals when wounded sought assistance, and shooting of children as young as two. In 2011, Human Rights Watch stated that Syria's bleak human rights record stood out in the region. While Human Rights Watch doesn't rank offenders, many have characterized Syria's human rights report as among the worst in the world in 2010.

As early as his public speech delivered on 30 March 2011, Assad had declared his intention to wipe out the protests with as much brute force as possible. He labelled the protests as an anti-Syrian conspiracy to foment "Fitna" and doubled down on his anti-Arab Spring stance stating: "Burying sedition is a national, moral, and religious duty, and all those who can contribute to burying it and do not are part of it. There is no compromise or middle way in this." In April 2011, Assad formed the Central Crisis Management Cell, a secret committee composed of high-ranking Baath party and Assad family elites, which centrally planned the national crackdown to suppress protests of the Syrian revolution.

As the revolution spread across all the provinces in Syria, the Crisis Management Cell decided to intensify the repression by unleashing more violence and co-ordinate the security response, in a Ba'ath Party meeting. The key aspects of the new crackdown strategy included:

- Secret police and armed forces were ordered to initiate large-scale incursions into the houses of protest planners and independent journalists
- "once each sector has been cleansed of wanted people", Ba'athist paramilitaries were to occupy these areas under protection of Syrian military and prevent survivors from returning to their homes
- Formation of "joint investigation committees" headed by leaders of the Baathist security departments across all provinces to incarcerate suspected activists and cross-examining them in prisons
- Transfer of the findings across all security branches for pinpointing of additional suspects
- The commands were passed down to the provincial leaders of the party who were instructed to swiftly execute the orders in their respective regions

We have murder, we have extermination, we have torture, we have rape, we have other forms of sexual violence. We have cruel detention. We have mutilation. There's no question they lead all the way to President Assad. I mean, this is a top down, organized effort. There are documents with his name on it. Clearly, he organizes this strategy,.. We've got better evidence against Assad and his clique than we had against Milosevic in Yugoslavia… even better than we had against the Nazis at Nuremberg, because the Nazis didn't actually take individual pictures of each of their victims with identifying information on them.

— Lawyer Stephen Rapp, Chairman of Commission for International Justice and Accountability (CIJA), on Assad regime's war-crimes

While Navi Pillay, the UN High Commissioner for Human Rights, said that both sides in the conflict appeared to have committed war crimes in 2012, United Nations' Independent International Commission of Inquiry on Syria also blamed the vast majority of atrocities on the Assad government forces. Baathist forces were responsible for vast majority of the killings during the war, far outstripping casualties inflicted by groups like IS. Over 21,000 deaths occurred in 2015 alone, with more than 75% of them (over 15,700) being perpetrated by Syrian regime forces. Regime attacks also resulted in more than 12,000 civilian deaths, with around 38% of the victims being women and children.

On 2 March 2018, UN High Commissioner for Human Rights, Zeid Ra'ad Al Hussein said, "Syria must be referred to the International Criminal Court. Attempts to thwart justice, and shield these criminals, are disgraceful." Commission for International Justice and Accountability (CIJA), an independent war-crimes documentation agency has been conducting investigations on the crimes and atrocities committed during the Syrian war, with the organization employing around a hundred Syrians and Iraqis in the country, some of them insiders within the state bureaucratic apparatus. In December 2018, CIJA chief Stephen Rapp who formerly served as the US Ambassador for Global Criminal Justice, stated that war-crimes committed by the Syrian regime constituted a "solid kind of evidence that we haven't really had since Nuremberg, when the Nazis were prosecuted." The proofs of documented crimes included a vast array of sources, ranging from 2 million video footages to the documents seized from the Baathist regional committees and command crisis centres. Rapp asserted that despite Russian objections in the UN Security Council, the evidences are sufficient for an international arrest warrant.

=== Detention centers ===
Detention Centers run by the Assad government have been one of the most glaring human rights abuses in Syria. In 2014, the Caesar Report showed gruesome photographs smuggled out of a Syria detention center showed "the systematic killing of more than 11,000 detainees by the Syrian government in one region" during a two and a half year period of the Syria Civil War. A 2016 United Nations investigative report described the detainees in Syrian prisons as suffering under "inhuman living conditions" characterized by unclean environment, lack of sanitation and food as well as systematic torture. Following the death of prisoners in custody, fake certificates were often distributed by the government to claim that the prisoners "died of natural causes". The report further denounced Assad regime's policies of torture and summary executions in detention centres as "extermination as a crime against humanity". Syrian dungeons have been compared to the Nazi extermination camps of World War II, due to the scale of torture and mass killings going on in its prison networks. Journalist Russ Wellen reports that the "state killing machine exceeds the capacity of the system to process".

In 2017 details emerged about Sednaya Prison, a military prison near Damascus operated by the Assad government. The prison has been used to hold thousands of prisoners, both civilian and government opposition. Amnesty International estimated that between 5,000 and 13,000 people were extrajudicially executed at the one prison between September 2011 and December 2015. Survivor accounts from state-run prisons describe inhumane conditions, starvation, psychological trauma, and torture.

Women have also faced human rights abuses and war crimes inside Assad prisons. A 2017 report by Lawyers and Doctors for Human Rights (LDHR) collected first-hand accounts from women who survived rape and torture in Assad prisons. The 2017 Amnesty report on Syria's Sednaya Prison described the torture methods and living conditions of military detention centres and prisons as "subhuman", stating:

"Detainees are tortured beginning from the moment of their arrest, during their "welcome parties" – a term commonly used by Syrian detainees and guards to refer to the severe beatings received upon arrival at a detention facility – and throughout their interrogations.. Common methods of torture include severe beating, the use of electric shocks, sexual violence including rape and stress positions. These methods are often used in combination during multiple sessions over the course of days, weeks or months... detainees are held in subhuman conditions and systematically denied their basic needs, including food, water, medicine, medical care and sanitation. They are packed into filthy, overcrowded cells without access to fresh air, sunlight or ventilation. In these conditions, scabies, lice, infections and diseases run rampant, and many detainees develop serious mental illnesses such as psychosis. As a result of the torture and conditions they are forced to endure, detainees in government custody are dying on a massive scale."

On 23 April 2020, two ex-Syrian secret police officers, Anwar R. and Eyad A., accused of committing war crimes in Syria's government-run detention center, appeared in a German court for a first of its kind trial. According to a 2018 report released by the expert panel of United Nations, the Assad government-run detention centers tortured more than 4,000 of the detained protestors and murdered at least 58 others.

=== Forced disappearances ===
Since the start of the civil war in 2011, more than 100,000 people have been detained, forcibly disappeared or went missing in Syria as of 2019. At least 90,000 of them are thought to have been detained or forcibly disappeared in Syria's state prisons. Other reports estimate that more than 128,000 civilians have been kidnapped or forcibly disappeared by the regime forces by 2019. Amnesty International stated in a 2019 press release:

"Until today, the Syrian government has failed to disclose the fate, names and location of people arbitrarily detained and disappeared by Syrian security forces. Some families were notified about the death of their relatives in detention, or were eventually able to find out that their loved one died in custody. Those who receive a death certificate – the only piece of "evidence" provided – are legally bound to then register the person's death in civil records, in order to obtain an official death certificate."

Between 2011 and 2015, more than 17,700 civilians captured under regime prisons were summarily executed. Between March 2011 and March 2023, an estimated 154,000 civilians have been forcibly disappeared, abducted or subject to arbitrary detentions in Syria; with over 135,000 individuals being tortured, imprisoned or dead in government detention centres as of 2023.

In June 2023, UN General Assembly voted in favour of establishing an independent body to investigate the whereabouts hundreds of thousands of missing civilians who have been forcibly disappeared, killed or languishing in Syrian government prisons. This was after increasing demands to establish a UN approved body by more than a hundred Syrian civil society groups and human rights organizations like the Amnesty International, Human Rights Watch and International Committee of the Red Cross. The objective of the new body is to ensure better co-ordination to collect information of disappeared individuals. The Assad regime denounced the vote as "flagrant interference" in Syria's domestic issues.

=== Child abductions ===
Navi Pillay, the United Nations High Commissioner for Human Rights, stated in March 2012 that Syrian military forces and Ba'athist paramilitaries were systemically abducting, detaining and torturing children. Suggesting that the UN Security Council should turn Bashar al-Assad over for prosecution in the International Criminal Court (ICC), Navi Pillay said:

"They've gone for the children - for whatever purposes - in large numbers. Hundreds detained and tortured... it's just horrendous, ...Children shot in the knees, held together with adults in really inhumane conditions, denied medical treatment for their injuries, either held as hostages or as sources of information."

Prior to its collapse on December 8th, 2024, the Ba'athist regime had arrested and detained children without trial until the age of 18, after which they were transferred to Ba'athist military field courts and killed. A 2024 investigative report by the Syrian Investigative Journalism Unit (SIRAJ) identified 24 Syrian children who were forcibly disappeared, had their assets confiscated, detained and later killed after they reached the age of 18.

The report, based on inside sources within the Ba'athist regime, interviews with victims' families, and public sources, estimated that more than 6,000 detainees who reached the age of 18 were ordered to killed by two Ba'athist military field courts in the Sednaya Prison and in al-Dimas town between 2014 and 2017, citing eyewitness accounts of an insider within the Ba'athist military police.

== See also ==
- Al-Marsad
- Caesar Syria Civilian Protection Act
- Human rights in Islamic countries
- Human rights in the Democratic Federation of Northern Syria
- Human rights in the Middle East
- Human trafficking in Syria
- Syrian Civil War
- Syrian Observatory for Human Rights
- Wissam Tarif

== References and footnotes ==
- – Syria profile
