= Joumana Seif =

Syrian human rights activist (born 1970)

- جمانة سيف
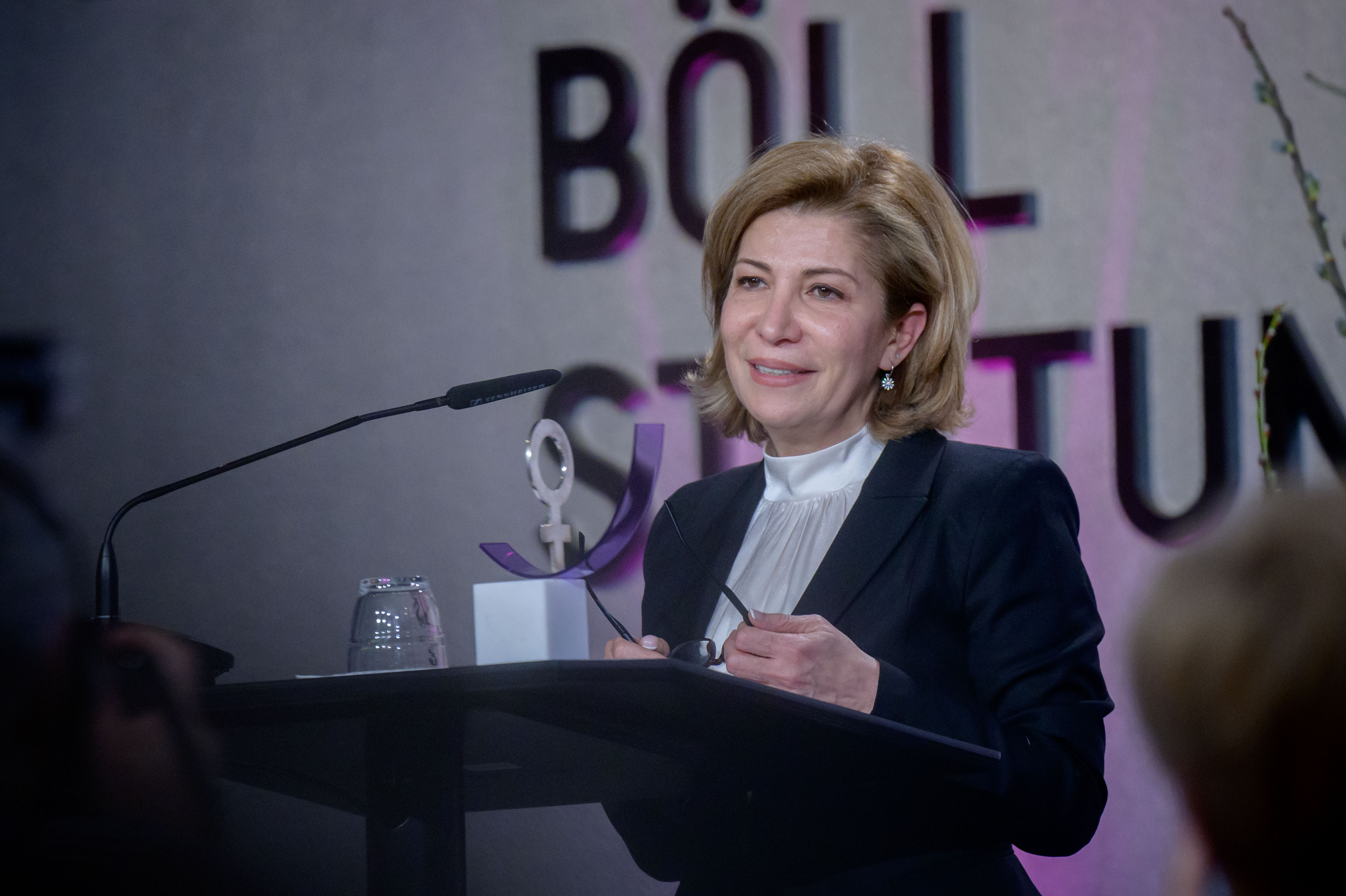
- Seif receiving the Anne Klein Women's Award in 2023
- Born: 1970 (age 55–56); Damascus, Syria
- Education: Beirut Arab University; Damascus University
- Occupations: Human rights activist Lawyer
- Years active: 2000–present
- Organization: Syrian Women's Network
- Known for: Advocating for the inclusion of women in the Syrian peace process
- Father: Riad Seif
- Awards: Anne Klein Women's Award (2023)

Joumana Seif (Arabic: جمانة سيف; born 1970) is a Syrian human rights activist and former businesswoman. The daughter of textile manufacturer and political dissident Riad Seif, Seif started her career working at her father's factory, before training as a lawyer following his arrest and imprisonment in 2001. Living in exile from Syria since 2012, Seif has advocated for the inclusion of women in the rebuilding of Syrian society following the civil war, for which she received the 2023 Anne Klein Women's Award from the Heinrich Böll Foundation.

== Early life and education ==
Seif was born in 1970 and raised in the conservative Al-Midan neighbourhood of Damascus. Her father, Riad Seif, was a textile manufacturer who became a member of parliament as an opposition politician against Hafez al-Assad during the 1990s. As a child, Seif's uncle disappeared after being detained by Syrian soldiers, while her cousin was imprisoned and tortured over 13 years at Tadmor Prison and Sednaya Prison; in 1991, Seif's brother Eyad disappeared while on a trip to Latakia. Seif's family were regularly spied on by government forces.

After graduating from high school, Seif began studying French literature at university, but soon dropped out to work at her father's factory. She later became the manager of its social welfare and development department, which she had initiated, providing educational programmes, healthcare and social services for the factory's workers, and was a member of the Chamber of Commerce and the Damascus Businesswomen's Council. Due to her father's opposition and criticisms of the Syrian government, he experienced harassment from authorities, including a high level of taxation, which led to the factory closing and him declaring bankruptcy in 2000.

== Activism ==
=== In Syria (2000–2012) ===
In 2000, following the death of Hafez al-Assad, Seif's father became a key member of what became the Damascus Spring, wherein calls were made to open up Syria's political system to respect human rights, democracy, and civil society. The subsequent crackdown on the Spring by Assad's successor and son, Bashar al-Assad, led to him being arrested and imprisoned between 2001 and 2012.

During her father's imprisonment, Seif acted as a liaison between him, other dissidents and activists, and national and international human rights organisations, culminating with her accepting the Weimar Human Rights Prize on his behalf in 2003. A member of the Syrian democracy movement, in 2005 Seif was among the signatories of the Damascus Declaration, which decried the Assad regime as being "authoritarian, totalitarian and cliquish" and called for "peaceful, gradual" reform.

In 2003, Seif began studying law, first at Beirut Arab University in Lebanon, and later at Damascus University. She primarily focused on representing and supporting political prisoners in Syria, though her registration with the Syrian Bar Association was revoked by the government; it was only reinstated in 2012.

=== In exile (2012–present) ===
In 2012, the year after the Syrian revolution, Seif left Syria, citing concerns for her safety after she and her family received death threats. In 2013, after periods living in the United States and Egypt, she settled in Berlin, Germany.

While Seif initially campaigned for rights for men and women alike, citing the universality of oppression under the Assad regime, she later decided to focus on campaigning for rights for women after attending a 2012 meeting of the Syrian National Council in Qatar, following which none of the 30 elected representatives to the council were women. In 2013, Seif co-founded the Syrian Women's Network, which advocated for gender equality and the inclusion of women in decision-making concerning the future of Syria.

Seif went on to establish other Syrian women's groups, including the Syrian Feminist Lobby in 2014, which campaigned for equal political rights for women; and the Syrian Women's Political Movement in 2017, which called for 30% of people involved in the decision-making for Syria's future to be women. Seif also participated in the Civil Society Support Rooms programme, to call publicly for inclusive peace talks in Geneva. Since 2020, Seif has served as the chairperson of the Day After: Supporting Democratic Transition in Syria.

In May 2017, Seif joined the European Centre for Constitutional and Human Rights' International Crimes and Legal Responsibility programme as a research associate. In March 2022, she was appointed the ECCHR's legal advisor on Syria and gender-based violence.

Between 2020 and 2022, Seif attended the al-Khatib trial in Germany at the Higher Regional Court of Koblenz, the first trial addressing state torture in Syria from the intelligence agency al-Khatib; she supported the survivors taking part in the trial.

Following the fall of the Assad regime in 2025, Seif was named as a member of the National Transitional Justice Commission, established by the new President of Syria, Ahmed al-Sharaa, to investigate crimes initiated by the previous government. In March 2026, Seif announced she had resigned from the commission.

Seif is a member of the Policy Coordination Group, a Syrian-led initiative on missing and disappeared people facilitated by the International Commission on Missing Persons. In 2026, Seif became the director of the Riad Seif Foundation for Human Rights, which trains people in international law.

== Recognition ==
In 2023, Seif received the Anne Klein Women's Award from the Heinrich Böll Foundation due to her work to have sexual violence classified as a war crime and a crime against humanity.
