= Hussein Aoudat =

Syrian writer and journalist

Hussein Aloudat
- حسين العودات
- Born: 1937; Umm Al-Mayathen, Daraa Governorate, Syria
- Died: 7 April 2016 (aged 78–79); Damascus, Syria
- Education: Licensed in geography and French language, and held a diploma in journalism

Hussein Aloudat (Arabic: حسين العودات; 1937–2016) was a Syrian writer and journalist, born in the countryside village of Umm Al-Mayathen, Daraa Governorate. He was licensed in geography and the French language, and held a diploma in journalism. He was the consultant of the Prime Minister for Culture and Journalism in Syria. He ran the Syrian Arabian News Agency and Dar Al-Ahali Publishing House. He prepared several studies on media and cultural affairs in Arab countries for ALECSO, ASBU, UNESCO, and ACRESEG.

== Early life ==
Aloudat was one of the most prominent symbols of the opposition since the beginning of the past decade, as he was among the founders of the Syrian cultural, social and political movement after the year 2001 known as the "Damascus Spring".

He participated in establishing civil society committees, and he was among its leaders.

He participated in the Syrian Forum's activity that was launched by Syrian people to discuss the Syrian situation and related issues, and he was arrested by the Political security at the time, then he participated in establishing the Damascus Declaration for National Democratic Change in 2005 as the main opposition coalition in Syria.

After the start of the Syrian revolution in 2011, Aloudat was among its most prominent supporters and participants, which exposed him to prosecution and security follow-up many times.

In 2011, he participated in establishing The National Coordination Committee for Democratic Change, and was also among the active participants in the Syrian Opposition Conference in Cairo in 2015. In addition to his activity in the opposition ranks, Aloudat was among the top Syrian journalists and writers.

== Career ==
1. Teacher 1956–1963.
2. Inspector of Education 1963–1964.
3. Director of Education in Dara’a Governorate 1964–1966.
4. Director General of the Syrian Arabian News Agency – SANA 1966–1970.
5. Consultant of the Prime Minister for cultural and journalism affairs 1971–1986.
6. Lecturer at the Department of Journalism, Damascus University, 1985–1986.
7. general manager of Dar Al-Ahali Publishing House 1987.
8. Part-time expert at the Arab League Educational, Cultural and Scientific Organization (ALECSO).

== Literary biography ==
In the journalism field, he established several media platforms, including the Syrian Arab News Agency "SANA" in 1966, and "Arab News" newspaper in 1990. He wrote articles and studies in dozens of Arab newspapers and periodicals.

He founded and took over the management of the "Dar Al-Ahali" for printing and publishing in Damascus in 1987, which is considered one of the most important Arab publishing houses. He has authored many books, including Death in Eastern Religions, Christian Arabs, The Arab Women in Religion and Society, the Other in Arab Culture, and Palestine Documents (1879–1987), and participated with others in authoring books, including the Encyclopaedia of Press in the Levant, and supervised the Palestinian Cities Encyclopaedia.

== Books ==
1. Death in the Eastern Religions, Damascus 1986.
2. Palestine documents (1879–1987) Tunisia 1989.
3. General Supervisor of the Palestinian Cities Encyclopaedia, Tunisia 1990.
4. Journalism in the Levant Encyclopaedia (with others) Tunisia 1991.
5. Journalism in the Diaspora Encyclopaedia (with others) Tunisia 1991.
6. The Christian Arabs, Damascus 1992.
7. Arab Women in Religion and Society, Damascus 1996.
8. Media Studies, 2006.
9. The Other in Arab Culture, Beirut 2010.
10. Participated with Professor Saad Labib in editing the New Arab System for Information and Communication, 1985.

== Latest activities ==
Aloudat's last political activity was signing with a group of Opponents in September 2015, a message to world leaders entitled "Alassad is not the saviour" during which they called on the General assembly to issue a historic resolution affirming the commitment of the international community to safeguard the rights of Syrians and protect the population of Syria, and to affirm the sovereignty and unity of its people in the face of all foreign ambitions and tutelage." As for the last post by Hussein Aloudat, it was about the suspension of his retirement salary by the President of the Writers' Union. Before that, he wrote, "I lost my sight and hope that I do not lose my insight."

== Death ==
He died in Damascus on Thursday 7 April 2016 at the age of eighty after struggling with illness for the last few years and reached deprivation of his sight.
