= Arab Revolutionary Workers Party =

Arab Revolutionary Workers Party حزب العمال الثوري العربي
- Chairman: Tariq Abu Al-Hassan
- Secretary-General: Abdul Hafiz Hafiz
- Founder: Yasin al-Hafiz
- Founded: 1966
- Split from: Ba'ath Party
- Ideology: Marxism; Scientific socialism Arab nationalism
- Political position: Left-wing
- National affiliation: National Democratic Rally
- Council of Representatives of Iraq: 0 / 328
- People's Council of Syria: 0 / 250

The Arab Revolutionary Workers Party (Arabic: حزب العمال الثوري العربي, romanized: Hizb Al-'Amal Al-Thawriy Al-'Arabi) is a political party active in Iraq and Syria. As of 2008 the general secretary of the party is Abdul Hafiz Hafiz. As of 2011, the chairman of the party is Tariq Abu Al-Hassan.

The party was founded in 1966 by Yasin al-Hafiz, as a Marxist splinter group of the Ba'ath Party. The party rejected the Ba'athist ideology of Michel Aflaq as reactionary and backward-looking. Instead the party opted for scientific socialism. Another early prominent leader of the party was Ali Salah Saadi. This split in the Ba'ath Party emerged parallel to the growth of leftist dissent in the Arab Nationalist Movement.

The party was active in Lebanon during the 1970s. During the initial years of the Lebanese Civil War (1975–76), al-Hafiz lived in Beirut. Al-Hafiz died in Beirut in October 1978.

During the "Damascus Spring", the initial period of Bashar al-Assad's rule, the party could meet somewhat undisturbed under the guise of the 'Left Forum'. The party, along with other left-wing groups in Syria, decided to boycott the 2003 parliamentary election. The party was one of the forces behind the National Democratic Gathering and the Damascus Declaration.

The party is part of the Syrian opposition and was active in the civil uprising phase of the Syrian Civil War. On June 30, 2011, the party took part in forming the National Coordination Committee for Democratic Change. A politburo member of the party, Hazem Al-Nahhar was included in the leadership of the Association. On October 10, 2011, the party decided to withdraw from the Coordination, but retained its commitment to working with the National Democratic Rally.
