= Statement of 99 =

2000 statement by Syrian intellectuals

The Statement of 99 was a statement made by 99 Syrian intellectuals on 27 September 2000, during the Damascus Spring that followed Hafez al-Assad's death in June of the same year. The intellectuals called for the state of emergency to be ended, for political prisoners to be pardoned, for deportees and exiles to be allowed to return, for legal protection for free speech and freedom of assembly, and to "free public life from the laws, constraints and various forms of surveillance imposed on it". Prominent signers included Abdulrazak Eid, Anwar al-Bunni, Mamdouh Adwan, Haidar Haidar, Ali al-Jundi, Ali Kanaan, and Michel Kilo.

After his death, it became known that Syrian renowned documentary filmmaker Omar Amiralay wrote the first draft of the statement, and developed it in collaboration with fellow filmmaker Usama Muhammad and writer/politician Mouaffaq Nyrabia.

== See also ==
- Politics of Ba'athist Syria
- Statement of 1000
- Damascus Declaration
- Arab Spring
- Syrian revolution
- Syrian opposition to Bashar al-Assad
