= Riad Seif Forum =

Political organization in Syria

The Riad Seif Forum (also called Forum for National Dialogue) is or was a political forum, or muntadat, founded by "businessman-turned-dissident" Riad Seif, promoting political debate and freedom in Syria. It was considered one of the two most famous such forums of the Damascus Spring during 2000-2001 in Syria.

Following the death of Syrian leader Hafez al-Assad in June 2000, Seif assembled "leading [Syrian] intellectuals and independent voices" to discuss "how to open up Syria's ... political system." The group — which met on Wednesdays evenings, in Seif's living room — "debated human rights, pluralism, press and academic freedoms, and how to build a civil society," and was the first of ten such forums that "marked the onset" of the Damascus Spring. It was later dubbed the Forum for National Dialogue according to journalist Robin Wright. In January 2001, Seif announced his intention to create a new political party to compete with the ruling Ba'th Party. A major seminar/meeting of the Forum was held on 5 September 2001. Several hundred people attended and leaders of the Syrian opposition called for political reform and democratic elections and discussed amending the constitution and issuing a call for a civil disobedience campaign. Following this Seif and the nine other opposition leaders were arrested.

According to Human Rights Watch, the two members of parliament, Riad Seif and Ma'mun al-Homsi, were accused of "attempting to change the constitution by illegal means" and "inciting racial and sectarian strife" and sentenced by the Damascus Criminal Court to five years in jail. The eight other activists — Riad al-Turk, Aref Dalila, Walid al-Bunni, Kamal al-Labwani, Habib Salih, Hasan Sa`dun, Habib `Isa, and Fawwaz Tello — were referred to the Supreme State Security Court which issued prison sentences between two and ten years. Seif was convicted and sentenced to five years in prison and released in January 2006.

== See also ==
- Politics of Syria
- Damascus Spring
