= Syrian National Democratic Council =

Syrian political opposition council

The Syrian National Democratic Council (SNDC) is a Syrian political opposition council created in November 2011 to oppose the current Syrian government. The council consists of Syrian opposition figures in exile. The group was organised by Rifaat al-Assad, Bashar al-Assad's uncle.

== See also ==
- Coalition of Secular and Democratic Syrians
- Damascus Declaration
- National Alliance for the Liberation of Syria
- National Coalition for Syrian Revolutionary and Opposition Forces
- National Coordination Committee for Democratic Change
- National Democratic Rally
- Popular Front for Change and Liberation
- Supreme Council of the Syrian Revolution
- Syrian National Council
- Syrian Revolution General Commission
