= NDG =

NDG may refer to:

- National Democratic Gathering, a Syrian political alliance
- New Dance Group, in New York City, United States
- Notre-Dame-de-Grâce, Montreal, Canada
- Qiqihar Sanjiazi Airport, China (IATA:NDG)
- Numero di Gestione (Italian Number management)
