= Faeq al-Mir arrest controversy =

Arrest, imprisonment, and calls for release of Faeq al-Mir

The Faeq al-Mir arrest controversy refers to the arrest, imprisonment, and calls for release of Faeq al-Mir, leader of the Syrian People’s Democratic Party, after he telephoned Elias Atallah, a Lebanese politician critical of Syrian policies there. In the call, taped by Syrian Intelligence forces, al-Mir gave condolences to Atallah regarding the assassination of Pierre Gemayel, Lebanon's Minister of Industry. Al-Mir was detained by Syrian security forces at his home in Latakia on December 13, 2006, and charged in March 2007 with "undertaking acts that weaken national sentiment during times of conflict" and "communicating with a foreign country to incite it to initiate aggression against Syria or to provide it with the means to do so." On December 31, 2007, Damascus's First Criminal Court ruled him guilty of "circulating false or exaggerated news which would weaken the morale of the nation" and sentenced him to three years in prison, though the duration was immediately reduced to 18 months. Human rights groups, including Human Rights Watch and Amnesty International, criticized the arrest and demanded al-Mir's unconditional release.

== Background ==
Having worked together for communist organizations in the mid-1980s, Faeq al-Mir and Elias Atallah boasted a close relationship at the time of the arrest. Al-Mir, a human rights activist, led the left-wing People’s Democratic Party, an unauthorized party critical of the Syrian government. Atallah was the leader and sole parliamentarian of the Democratic Left Movement, a leftist Lebanese party. He was also a senior figure in the March 14 Alliance, a Lebanese parliamentary coalition critical of Syrian policies. The two conversed over the phone several times prior to the arrest. They often lamented the assassinations of anti-Syrian Lebanese figures like Samir Kassir. Al-Mir, who was released from a previous ten-year prison sentence related to political activism in 1999, visited Lebanon in 2006 to mourn the killing of George Hawi, a former leader of the Lebanese Communist Party. According to Amnesty International and Human Rights Watch, this contributed to al-Mir's arrest at the end of the year.

While the Syrian constitution liberally grants free speech, a state of emergency in effect since the Baath Party seized power suspends this freedom. Syria has stringently approached dissidents who question its policies in neighboring Lebanon; Syrian authorities detained and imprisoned ten activists who signed the Beirut-Damascus Declaration petition in May 2006. The petition, of which al-Mir was a signatory, advocated the withdrawal of Syrian troops from Lebanon and the normalization of relations between the two countries.

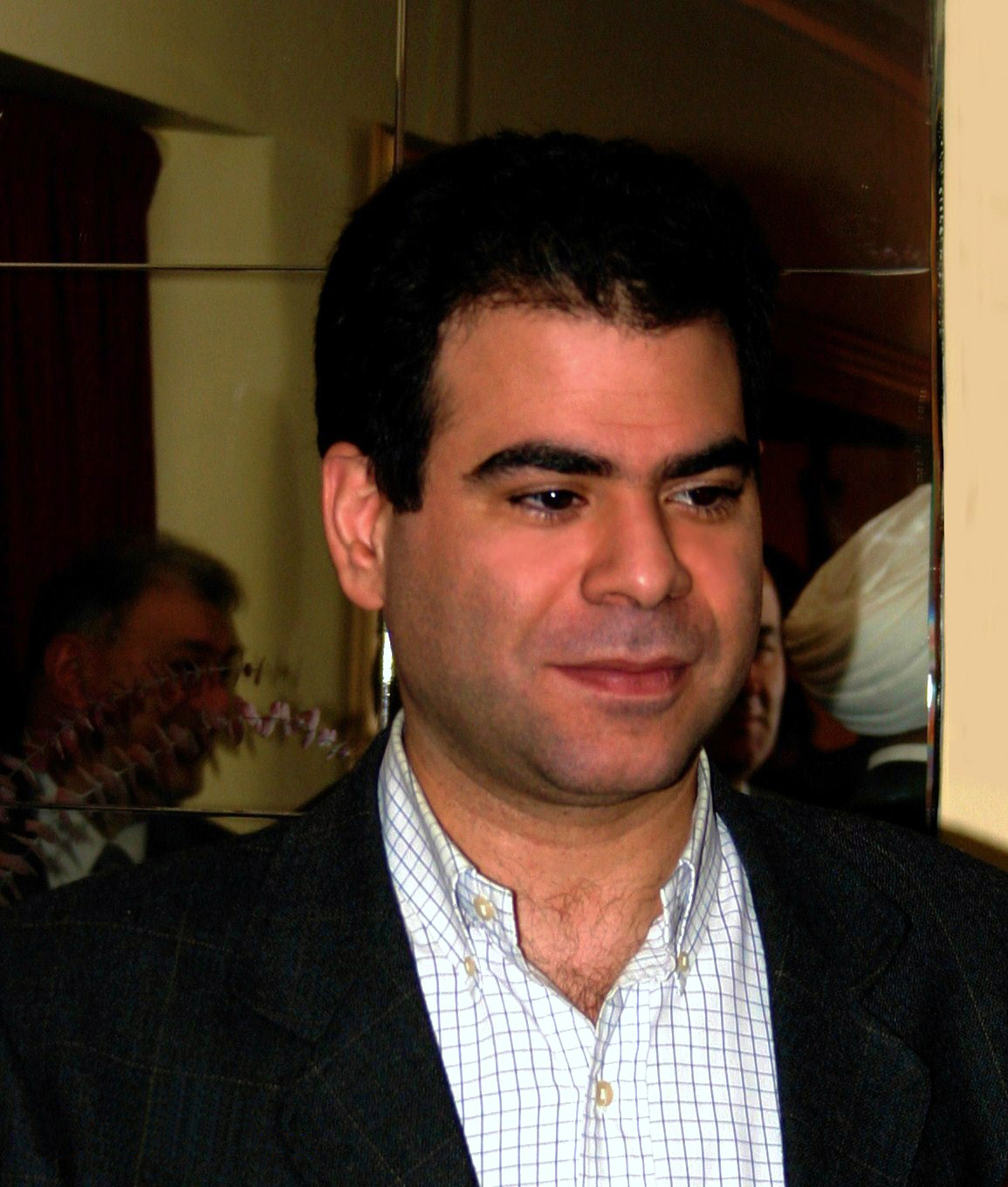
Pierre Amine Gemayel prior to his assassination

=== The call ===
In a December 2006 phone call, al-Mir bestowed his condolences to Atallah regarding the November 21 assassination of Pierre Gemayel, Lebanon's Minister of Industry and an anti-Syrian politician. The call was taped by Syrian intelligence forces, known as the Mukhabarat.

== Arrest and Trial ==
On December 13, 2006, Syrian security forces arrested al-Mir at his home in Latakia on Syria's western coast, and he has remained in detention since.

In March 2007, Syrian authorities charged al-Mir with "undertaking acts that weaken national sentiment" during times of conflict and "communicating with a foreign country to incite it to initiate aggression against Syria or to provide it with the means to do so." The second charge bears a life sentence and could entail the death penalty if the foreign nation initiates aggression against Syria.

Al-Mir's trial began before the Damascus First Criminal Court on August 29, 2007. His indictment stated he "contacted enemies of the state in Lebanon including members of the March 14 group, and he knows that the ideas and direction of this group are in accordance with the American and Zionist direction which are against the national approach of the Syrian government." It accused al-Mir of conveying "support for the approach and direction of March 14" during the phone call. Al-Mir denied this, stating that he called Atallah only as head of the Democratic Left Movement. On November 8, the court adjourned his trial, postponing the verdict until November 28 as a result of the defense filing a petition to dismiss the judge in session.

On December 31, 2007, the Damascus First Criminal Court ruled al-Mir guilty of "circulating false or exaggerated news which would weaken the morale of the nation". In accordance with an amnesty provision, the court dropped the charge of "circulating knowingly false or exaggerated news abroad, which would harm the State or its financial standing". He was sentenced to three years in prison, though the duration was immediately commuted to one and a half years. The court elected to consider al-Mir's detention before the trial as part of his prison term.

== Aftermath ==
Syria’s arrest and prosecution of Faeq al-Mir reveals the government’s intolerance for even the slightest hint of opposition. Al-Mir face[d] the possibility of life in prison or even execution for phoning a Lebanese opponent of Syria’s policies there.

— Sarah Leah Whitson, Middle East director at Human Rights Watch

Deeming the charges against him "politically motivated", Human Rights Watch called for al-Mir's immediate release. The organization included his arrest in the Syrian section of its 2008 World Report, a human rights assessment. Amnesty International judged al-Mir a "prisoner of conscience" and called for "his immediate and unconditional release." Atallah — speaking to NOW Lebanon, a Lebanese newspaper — praised al-Mir's human-rights activism and commented "arresting someone for a phone call is unheard of... every free and democratic Lebanese citizen is in solidarity with [Mir] and his comrades, and they demand that he is set free along with all the political prisoners in Syria.”

According to NOW Lebanon, al-Mir's indictment implied that "any support for March 14 – the ruling parliamentary majority in Lebanon – is tantamount to treason," a precedent that was "portentous for the future of Lebanese-Syrian relations or for the revitalization of democracy inside of Syria." In a letter smuggled out of Adra Prison and published by a Lebanese newspaper, al-Mir and five other imprisoned activists denounced the "repressive climate" in their country and wrote "Our situation as prisoners of conscience is part ... of the crisis of public freedoms and human rights in Syria, which started with the state of emergency imposed 44 years ago."

Al-Mir was released from prison on July 13, 2008 after spending a year and a half in prison.

== During the Syrian Uprising ==
Faeq al-Mir became actively involved in the Syrian Revolution right from the beginning. As a result, he went into hiding in Ghouta near Damascus to avoid arrest by the security agencies of the Syrian government. However, on Monday October 7, 2013, he was arrested during a visit to the city of Damascus.

Faeq al-Mir is known among supporters of the Syrian opposition with the title "al-e'mem" (Levantine Arabic: العميم, meaning "the uncle") in recognition for his lifelong political activism against the dictatorship of Al-Assad family in Syria.

== See also ==
- National Progressive Front
- Politics of Syria
