= Ali al-Jundi =

Syrian poet (1928–2009)

Ali al-Jundi علي الجندي
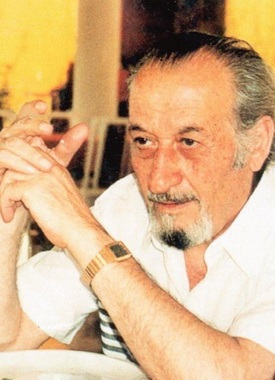
- Al-Jundi in his seventies
- Born: March 17, 1928; Salamiyah
- Died: August 7, 2009 (aged 81); Latakia
- Occupations: poet, journalist

Ali al-Jundi (March 17, 1928 – August 7, 2009) was a renowned Syrian poet. He is considered one of the pioneers of Arabic free verse poetry.

== Biography ==
Ali al-Jundi was born in Salamiyah, Syria in the Hama Governorate. He was from a well-known Ismaili family, although he himself rejected organized religions. His brother was politician Sami al-Jundi, and his cousin was Abd al-Karim al-Jundi. After graduating with a BA in Philosophy from Damascus University in 1955, he worked as a teacher and journalist in Damascus and Beirut, then as head of the Directorate of News and Media in Syria. He eventually became the editor of the main government newspaper, where he worked until his retirement. He was one of the founding members of the Arab Writers Union in 1962, of which he was made vice president in 1969. Following the death of Hafez al-Assad in 2000, he joined 98 other prominent Syrian intellectuals as a signatory of the Statement of 99.

He wrote poetry throughout most of his life. He died on August 7, 2009, and was buried in his hometown of Salamiyah near the grave of Muhammad al-Maghut.

== Poetry ==
Al-Jundi was one of several free verse poets who rejected traditional Arabic prosody in the early 1960s, part of a larger movement of Middle Eastern modernization at the time. The lack of steady meter and rhyming couplets was controversial, as was the investigation of more existential topics such as the nature of being, nothingness, and death. Though disdained by many contemporaries, the movement was well received by the younger generation in Beirut and soon gained popularity throughout the region.

== Poetry collections ==
- The Felled Banner, 1962
- In the Beginning There Was Silence, 1964
- Earthy Fever, 1969
- The Sun and the Fingers of the Dead, 1972
- The Black Mediterranean, 1975
- Tarafa in the Tropic of Cancer, 1975
- Bleeding Under the Skin, 1978
- Al-Rubaiyat, 1980
- Far Away in Silence, Close By in Forgetfulness, 1981
- Timed Poems, 1980
- Became Ashes, 1987
- A Swallow for the Last Light, 1992
