= Abdulrazak Eid =

Syrian writer and dissident (born 1950)

Abdulrazak Eid عبد الرزاق عيد
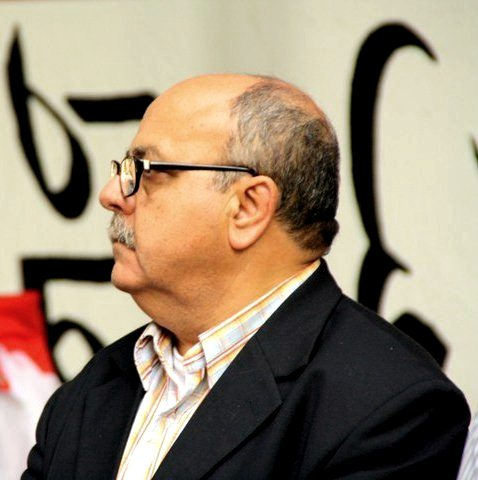
- Abdulrazak Eid
- Born: September 10, 1950 (age 76); Ariha, Syria
- Occupations: Writer and thinker
- Board member of: President of the national council of Damascus Declaration abroad

Abdulrazak Eid, (Note: Also spelled Abdul razzak Eid, Abdul razaq Eid, Abdel razzak Eid, Abdul razzaq Eid, or Abd al Razzaq 'Id) (Arabic:عبد الرزاق عيد; born September 10, 1950) is a Syrian writer and thinker and one of Syria's leading reformers. He helped to found the Committees of Civil Society in Syria, drafted the Statement of 1000 and helped to draft the Damascus Declaration. Because of his opposition writings and political actions, he was arrested many times in Syria, banned from working and traveling, kidnapped by the Syrian intelligence forces, and was threatened with being assassinated. He fled Syria in 2008 for exile in Europe where he was elected president of the National Council of Damascus Declaration in exile.

== Childhood and education ==
Eid was born on September 10, 1950, in the small city of Ariha, Syria, where he spent the first five years of his childhood before moving with his family to Aleppo. He finished his undergraduate studies in Arabic Literature at Aleppo University in 1974. In 1978, he traveled to France to continue his studies, where he received a diploma in Modern Literary Criticism from the Sorbonne (Paris III) on June 29, 1981. In 1983 he obtained a PhD in the same field in the Islamic studies department at the Sorbonne.

== Work ==
After obtaining his PhD, Eid returned to Syria to teach at Aleppo University, where he taught Modern Literature in the Faculty of Arts and Human Sciences in 1983. He was expelled by the Syrian Intelligence Security Forces Mukhabarat after 2 months for political reasons. He was banned from any professional work for most of his life because of his opposing political opinions.

He worked as a full-time researcher in the Palestinian Institute of "Ibal 1989–1992", where he helped to publish its Journal Kadaya wa Shahadat and published one of his books in the same institute. He taught in the Faculty of Education, Arts and Sciences in Aden University, Yemen, in the academic years 1991–1994. Eid spent most of his time reading and writing books. He has published more than 30 books and written and published many research articles.

Eid's main studies were in critiquing novels, so he wrote books about critiquing Arab and Syrian novels. Yet his major work is in sociology, philosophy, and Islamic philosophy. His book The crisis of Enlightenment is considered by many Arabic writers as one of the important books in Arabic enlightenment library. From 1999 to 2010 he worked on critiquing the Islamic mentality and wrote two books under the title The Custodians of the Delusion Temples / Critic of the doctrinal mentality, in which he discussed and critiqued the work of two of the most influential Islamic clerics, Muhammad Sa'id Ramadan al-Buti and Yusuf al-Qaradawi.

== Political life ==
Eid has been an opponent of the Syrian government all of his life. He was banned from working, arrested many times, tried by the Military Court for his articles, kidnapped and threatened with assassination because of his opposing positions and writings.

His main political activity started in 2000, after the death of Hafez al-Assad, when he joined with 98 other Syrian intellectuals in issuing a statement called the Statement of 99, calling for democratic reform in Syria. In 2001, he and a number of Syrian writers, thinkers and intellectuals founded the Committees of Civil Society in Syria by issuing the Statement of 1000, which he had drafted, calling for reform and democracy in Syria. It was so named because 1000 Syrian intellectuals signed it. During this period, known as the Damascus Spring, Eid helped to establish many cultural forums around Syria. One of the most recognized was the Jamal al-Atassi Forum in Damascus, where Eid delivered its first lecture, entitled "The Culture of Fear". This democratic movement was brought to an end by closing all the forums and arresting 12 opponents, who were sentenced to prison for 5–12 years.

For four years, Eid wrote from time to time in the An-Nahar newspaper, which became the main publisher of his critical and opposition articles. These articles were published later in his book Questions about the Civil Society. He was brought in front of the Military Court in Aleppo in June 2004 because of them.

=== Speeches Abroad ===
In the period between November 15, 2002, and January 15, 2003, Eid was invited by the French Ministry of Higher Education to conduct scientific research at the Sorbonne. This invitation came after huge media attacks against him because of one of his articles in the An-Nahar newspaper of August 23, 2002. A member of the Syrian parliament called for Eid to be prosecuted for treason, claiming that Eid has called for international intervention in Syria similar to the one in Iraq.

In 2005, The Goethe Institute was forced to cancel a lecture by Eid on aspects of Germany's Iraq Policy. According to a German diplomat, Eid's presentation made heavy use of veiled language about the Iraqi Ba'ath Party to criticize the Syrian Ba'ath Party. The same year and after the assassination of Rafic Hariri, Eid and other Syrian intellectuals and human rights activists urged withdrawal of the Syrian army from Lebanon

=== Kidnapping ===
Eid was kidnapped by the Mukhbarat in the street at midnight on February 8, 2007, because of an article in As-Safir newspaper in which he criticized Hezbollah and its alliance with Syria and Iran. He was freed the next day after they threatened to cut out his tongue if he spoke against Hezbollah again. Later the same year he was banned from traveling to France for medication after being diagnosed with prostate cancer. He was finally allowed to travel after a major two-month support campaign.

After his prostate surgery, he insisted on going back to Syria, where he was threatened with assassination by the security forces. The threat said that it would be made to look as if the Salafists had killed him to avenge the assassination of their leader Abul-Kaka, who was mentioned in an article by Neil MacFarquhar in The New York Times, for which Eid had been interviewed.

In February 2008, the security forces put his house under siege to arrest him, but he escaped to Lebanon after being hidden for a month in Syria. He spent two months in Beirut, then went with his family into exile in France. He has been living there as a political refugee since then, supported by human rights organizations such as Amnesty International and Revivre. He was elected president of the National Council of Damascus Declaration in Exile in October 2010.

He is one of the main figures in the Syrian opposition and plays a major role in the Syrian Revolution. In May 2011, Eid invited Syrian opposition members and figures to the Antalya Conference for Change in Syria, second of its kind since the beginning of the uprising, which he organized together with Ammar al-Qurabi. When Burhan Ghalioun, first chairman of the later Syrian National Council, criticized the Antalya Conference as "serving foreign agendas," Eid accused Ghalioun of attempting to appease the regime.

On the March 26–27, 2012, he led the initiative of uniting the Syrian opposition groups and figures in Istanbul Conference for the Syrian opposition.

== Bibliography – Selected Works in Arabic ==
Eid has published in many journals, magazines, and newspapers since 1975. He has published around 30 books since 1979:

- The Story world of Hanna Mina – Dar el Adab – Beirut, 1979.
- The Cultural, The Aesthetic, and The Ideological – Dar El Hewar – Latakia, 1988
- In the sociology of the Novel Text – Dar El ahali – Damascus, 1988
- The Story world of Zakaria Tamer – Dar El Farabi – Beirut, 1990
- An introduction to Raif Khoury Thought – Ibal Institution – Cyprus, 1990.
- We and the Bureaustroika – Dar El Hewar – Latakia, 1991.
- Taha Hussein: The mind and the religion "An approach to the problem of Methodology" – Inmaa Hadari Centre – Aleppo, 1995 – Published in an extended and edited version by Roya in Cairo, 2009.
- Yassin el-hafez: Critic of the backward modernism – Dar El sadaka – Aleppo, 1996
- The crisis of Enlightenment – Dar El ahali – 1st Ed Damascus, 1997 – 2nd Ed Inmaa Hadari Centre, 2005.
- Democracy between Secularism and Islam – Dar El fikr – Damascus, 1999
- Abū Hayyān al-Tawhīdī (Separation of Religion and State/ Separation of religion and philosophy) – Dar El ahali – Damascus, 2001
- The Forbiddance Mentality – Dar El hewar – Latakia – 1st edition, 2001 – 2nd Edition by Roya in Cairo, (2009).
- The Custodians of the Delusion Temples / Critic of the doctrinal mentality: Muhammad Sa'id Ramadan al-Buti as an example – Dar El Talia'a – Beirut, 2003.
- Questions about the Civil Society (burying the spring of Damascus alive) – Dar El Tanweer – Beirut and Dar El inmaa hadari in Cairo, 2003 (1st ed) 2005 (2nd ed).
- The Custodians of the Delusion Temples / Critic of the doctrinal mentality: Yusuf al-Qaradawi between Tolerance and Terrorism – Published by The League of Rational Arabs – Dar El Taliaa – Beirut, 1st ed. 2005 – 2nd ed. 2007
- Muhammad Abduh: The Constitution's Imam – The Iraqi Strategic Research Centre – Beirut and Baghdad, 2006.
- Islam and Modernism – Muhammad Abduh's Experience – The Iraqi Strategic Research Centre – Beirut and Baghdad, 2006.
- Critic of the Political and patriarchal mentality: Published by The League of Rational Arabs – Dar El Taliaa – Beirut, 2007

== Conferences ==
Eid has participated in many conferences since 1975. The main ones are:

- The Writers conference in Algeria – 1975.
- Aden University Conference – 1991.
- A conference held by the Kuwaiti Writers Union in Kuwait – 1994.
- Ausha Bint Hussien Conference in UAE – 1995.
- A conference held by Sharjah Writers Union – 1995.
- The Research and Studies Center's Conference Egypt – 1995
- Conference Abū Hayyān al-Tawhīdī – Organized by the Highest Council of Culture, literature and Art in Cairo, Egypt – 1995.
- Conference in remembrance of the 1st edition of the Qasim Amin Book Liberation of Women, Organized by the Highest Council of Culture, literature and Art in Cairo – 1999
- The International Conference of the French Institute for the Oriental Studies in Damascus – 2000
- Conference about the Sociological Research: Algeria University – 2001.
- The international conference on Modern Arab Literature, Sorbonne Paris 3 – 2003.
- The second International Conference about the Freedom of Speech in the Library of Alexandria Egypt – 2004.
- The conference of establishing the Arab institution for Modernizing Arab Thinking Beirut – 2004.
- Invitation from the Aspen Institute in Berlin to make a presentation about the human rights in the Arab world and Syria in the years 2005 and 2006.
- Hudson Institute Conference on Syria

Because of his civil and democratic activities in national and international conferences and his writings and participation in political and controversial television programs, Eid was banned from traveling and was prevented from attending a number of conferences. He was prohibited from traveling to Doha, Qatar, to take part in a conference on "Democracy and Human Rights in the Arab World" organized by the Aspen Institute. Eid had returned to Syria on March 11 after participating in a conference in Paris (also organized by the Aspen Institute), which was attended by various opposition groups from inside and outside Syria. He was prohibited from attending another conference organized by the Aspen Institute in Istanbul at the same time.
