= Michel Kilo =

Syrian Christian writer and activist (1940–2021)

Michel Kilo ميشيل كيلو
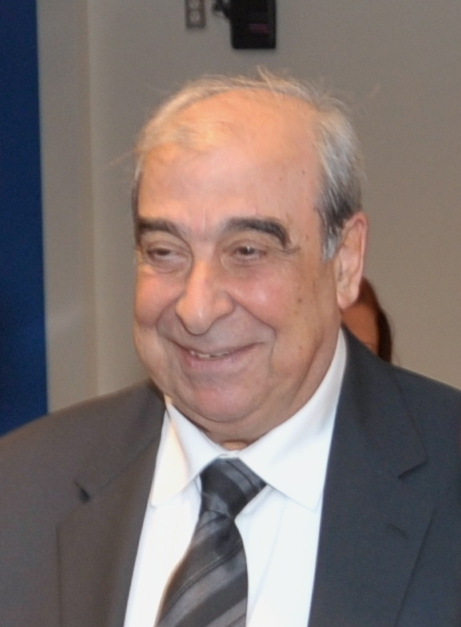
- Born: 1940; Latakia, Syria
- Died: 19 April 2021 (aged 80–81); Paris, France
- Occupation: Writer
- Known for: Democracy activist, political prisoner

Michel Kilo (Arabic: ميشيل كيلو; 1940 – 19 April 2021) was a Syrian writer and human rights activist, who has been called "one of Syria's leading opposition thinkers."

== Career ==
Kilo was born to a Christian family in the Syrian Mediterranean coastal city and province of Latakia in 1940. His family were members of the Syrian Communist Party

He studied journalism in Egypt and Germany. He has translated many political and economics books from German to English. As a columnist he wrote opinion pieces for two Arabic papers, the Lebanese daily Annahar and the London-based Al-Quds Al-Arabi. In 2011 he wrote several articles about the Syrian uprising for the As-Safir Lebanese daily newspaper.

== Troubles with the government ==
Kilo was first arrested by the government in the early 1980s, following this arrest he moved to France but came back to Syria in 1991. Following the Damascus Spring movement, Kilo was a central figure in the Damascus Declaration of 2005 and called for "peaceful, gradual," reform "founded on accord, and based on dialogue and recognition of the other."

On 12 May 2006, the Beirut-Damascus Declaration, calling for normalising Lebanese-Syrian relations after decades of domination by Syria of its smaller neighbour Lebanon, was published with Kilo as one of its signatories. He was arrested yet again and a year later was sentenced to three years in prison on charges of "weakening national sentiment and encouraging sectarian strife." On 19 May 2009, he was released after completing all of his sentence.

In May 2013, Kilo declined to become a member of the Syrian National Coalition after his group was offered only 5 seats on the said coalition.

== Criticizing Kurdish federalism project in Syria ==
Michel Kilo told Madar Daily in April 2016 that the Kurdish Democratic Union Party’s project for federalism is a project to divide Syria. "We refuse it, even when the US support it and there is no historical proof for the existence of a Kurdistan region in Syria. This isn’t a second Israel, they cannot snatch a Kurdistan from Syria, if they try to divide Syria, we will break their backs." These remarks were across political camps in Syrian-Kurdish society rejected as both racist and denying the reality of the Federation of Northern Syria - Rojava.

== Death ==
He died on 19 April 2021, at a hospital in Paris from COVID-19.
