= National Democratic Rally (Syria) =

Banned opposition alliance in Syria

National Democratic Rally التجمع الوطني الديمقراطي
- Leader: Jamal al-Atassi
- Spokesperson: Hassan Ismail Abdelazim
- Founded: January 1980
- Ideology: Arab nationalism Democratic socialism Social democracy Nasserism; Scientific socialism Communism; Marxism
- Political position: Left-wing

The National Democratic Rally or National Democratic Gathering (Arabic: التجمع الوطني الديمقراطي, at-tajammuʻ al-waţanī ad-dīmūqrāţī) is an opposition alliance in Syria previously banned under the Ba'athist government, comprising five political parties of a secularist, pan-Arabist, Arab nationalist and socialist bent.

Hassan Ismail Abdelazim, leader of the Democratic Arab Socialist Union, is the official spokesman of the Rally.

== Member parties ==
The founding member parties were:

- The Democratic Arab Socialist Union - a splinter of the Arab Socialist Union Party of Syria, formerly the main Nasserist party in Syria.
- The Syrian Democratic People's Party - Riad al-Turk's group, formerly called the Syrian Communist Party - Political Bureau, and an offshoot of the Syrian Communist Party.
- The Arab Revolutionary Workers Party - a leftist-Marxist offshoot of the Ba'ath Party from the 1960s, which for some time had active branches in Lebanon and Iraq as well.
- The Arab Socialist Movement - an Arab socialist group with roots in Akram al-Hawrani's pre-Ba'ath peasant movement.
- The Democratic Socialist Arab Ba'ath Party - a remnant of Salah Jadid's left-wing faction of the Ba'ath Party, led by his former Foreign Minister Ibrahim Makhous.

In 2006, a sixth party joined the coalition:

- The Communist Labour Party - the recreation of a hardline communist group repressed in the 1980s, which originally had its roots in 1970s Syrian student radicalism, with pro-Sandinista, Guevarist and Maoist tendencies.

== History ==
The National Democratic Rally was formed in January 1980 by the five member parties listed above, and its membership has not changed since. In several cases these parties were originally opposition wings of parties that had joined the governing National Progressive Front, which is a leftist nationalist party coalition established under the leadership of the Syrian Ba'ath Party. A few parties also had sister parties or factions in other Arab states, such as Nasserist Egypt or Ba'athist Iraq. Its first spokesman was Democratic Arab Socialist Union chairman Jamal al-Atassi. At his death in the year 2000, his role was inherited by his successor at the helm of DASU, Hassan Ismail Abdelazim.

The Rally took part in the opposition movement of 1980 - a period of civil protest by leftist, Islamist, liberal and nationalist groups which coincided with an armed uprising by Islamists in the Muslim Brotherhood and more radical factions. This led to severe repression of the Rally by the Syrian government; several of its main leaders were given long prison sentences (e.g. Riad al-Turk, jailed 1980–98). The Rally was later active in the Damascus Spring of 2000, holding seminars and advocating political freedom. However, its member parties are now relatively marginal on the Syrian political scene, even if they remain an important segment of the organized opposition, due to decades of severe repression and denial of freedom to organize. Most leaders and many members are today old men, after joining or founding their respective parties in the early 1960s to late 1970s, and have had relatively poor success in appealing to younger generations of Syrians.

== See also ==
- Damascus Declaration
- High Negotiations Committee
- Movement for a Democratic Society
- National Alliance for the Liberation of Syria
- National Coalition for Syrian Revolutionary and Opposition Forces
- National Coordination Committee for Democratic Change
- Popular Front for Change and Liberation
- Syrian National Democratic Council
- Syrian National Council
- Syrian Revolution General Commission
