= Wissam Tarif =

Wissam Kassem Tarif
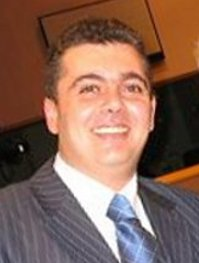
- Tarif. Picture taken in 2008 at the European Parliament
- Born: 10 April 1975 (age 51); Zahle, Lebanon
- Occupations: Democracy & Human Rights defender

Wissam Kassem Tarif (born 10 April 1975) has played a key role in the field of pro-Democracy and Human Rights work in Syria and Lebanon. As director of a Middle East human rights organisation, he advocates for democracy and works on a regional and international level, focusing on the situation in Syria, Iran and Saudi Arabia in particular.

== Biography ==
Tarif was born in Lebanon's Beka'a Valley city of Zahlé, (Arabic: زحلة His family comes from the small mountain town of al-Karaoun on the banks of Lake Litani in the same region. They are known in Lebanon for their courage when faced with the occupation of their town (the family was the first to have their home blown up by the invading army).

"When, at 12 years old, my friend Jude was run over by a military tank, I was splattered by his flesh. I can still taste the burning skin whenever I remember it. It was something that changed my life, made me aware of the importance of being human, being a person," Tarif recalls.

Having grown up with the sounds, smells and tragedy of continuous conflict all his life, at the age of 13, Wissam Tarif was sent by his family to South America (Paraguay and Argentina), where he joined elder brothers who had been sent ahead of him.

Immersing himself in civil society institutions in Beirut, Tarif started by working for Greenpeace where he began to get a feel for the region's concerns at grass roots level, making his initial appearance on the opinion and analysis pages of well-known and respected Middle East newspapers and magazines, such as An-Nahar. Coming, as he did, to the attention of numerous politicians and leading intellectuals in Lebanon (as was the case with the redoubtable Samir Kassir, with whom a warm friendship grew), Tarif soon became an integral part of intellectual life in Beirut. Anxious, however, to continue contributing to democracy and human rights values in the region, he eventually moved to Damascus, Syria, where he founded a cultural centre.

Parallel to this, Tarif became a prime mover of the Opposition forces in Syria, working closely with well-known artist, political dissident, prisoner of conscience and human rights leader Kamal Labwani, (sent to jail in Syria on a 15-year term for his advocacy of democracy) to found the Liberal Democratic Union. Tarif worked to support and promote the values of a movement known as the Damascus Spring, which blossomed following the coming to power of the new President of Syria, Bashaar al-Assad. The tightening of the Syrian regime's grip on power led to the imprisonment of the majority of voices claiming freedom and democracy.

== Working for democracy ==
Interrogated 17 times by the Syrian security police during his time in Syria, there have been various attempts on his life. He continues to campaign as Director of the Middle East human rights organisation, the Foundation for the Defense of Prisoners of Conscience (FDPOC).

== The Foundation for the Defense of Prisoners of Conscience (FDPOC) and INSAN ==
FDPOC (now superseded by the Europe-based NGO INSAN INSAN)worked in Syria, Iran and Saudi Arabia in particular. It received daily monitoring reports from grass roots activists within its countries of focus, in order to ensure that the rest of the world heard about the violations of human rights the authorities preferred to keep silent.

The organisation and its Board of Trustees were also active at an international level.

Wissam Tarif, however, argued for a wider, more global vision for the Organisation, as a result of which FDPOC took a strategic decision in 2009: to maintain its activists and workers in situ in the Middle East but to shift its centre of operations to the European Union in order to not only increase its operational effectiveness, but to ensure a framework of freedom which would better enable it to ensure human rights in the region were better and more immediately projected. The new organisation, under the name of 'INSAN' (www.insanintl.com) is a fully registered NGO with its headquarters in Spain. INSAN thus builds on the previous work done by FDPOC but, at the same time, expands upon it. INSAN's work, while focussing on human rights, also covers the broader fields of democracy and development issues across not only the Middle East but also throughout North Africa (MENA). It was in this wider context (and to facilitate its activist and campaigning work), that the Organisation's offices were transferred to Spain, which is strategically situated to service the logistic and campaigning needs of this already growing but well-established Organisation. This is especially the case with an eye to INSAN's centre of operations in the MENA region and to the closeness of influential EU institutions and politicians in Brussels.

Wissam Tarif is currently executive director of INSAN.

== See also ==
- Human rights in Lebanon
- Human rights in Syria
