= Statement of 1000 =

Syrian political statement

The Statement of 1000 was a statement by 1000 Syrian intellectuals in January 2001, during the Damascus Spring, following the earlier Statement of 99 made in September 2000. The Statement of 1000 was more detailed than the earlier statement, criticising the effective one-party rule of the Ba'ath Party and calling for multiparty democracy, with an independent judiciary and without discrimination against women.

== See also ==
- Politics of Ba'athist Syria
- Damascus Declaration
- Arab Spring
- Syrian revolution
- Syrian opposition to Bashar al-Assad
