= Syrian Democratic People's Party =

Syrian Democratic People's Party حزب الشعب الديمقراطي السوري
- Leader: Ghias Youn al-Soud
- Founder: Riad al-Turk
- Founded: 1973
- Split from: Syrian Communist Party
- Headquarters: Paris, France
- Ideology: Social democracy Democratic socialism Left-wing nationalism Secularism; Left-wing populism Historical: Communism (Until 2005); Marxism-Leninism (Early 1980s–2005)
- Political position: Centre-left to left-wing Historical: Left-wing to far-left
- National affiliation: National Democratic Rally
- International affiliation: Progressive Alliance
- Colors: Red

Website
- www.syria-sdpp.org

Riad al-Turk, founder of the party

The Syrian Democratic People's Party (Arabic: حزب الشعب الديمقراطي السوري, romanized: Hizb Al-Sha'ab Al-Dimuqratiy Al-Suriy) is a centre-left, democratic opposition party in Syria. It is a member of the Syrian opposition, a member of the National Democratic Rally, and a participant in the Damascus Declaration.

The party emerged in 1973 from a split within the Syrian Communist Party. Until 2005, it operated under the name Syrian Communist Party (Political Bureau), and was also known as the Syrian Communist Party (Riyad al-Turk) after its founder Riyad al-Turk. In 2005, the party announced its departure from communism and turned to social democracy and democratic socialism. Today, the party is a member of the Progressive Alliance.

== Origins and split from the SCP ==
The party was formed from a split in the Syrian Communist Party, beginning in the late 1960s with disagreements over Arab nationalism and the authoritarian leadership of Khaled Bakdash. Radicals around Riyad al-Turk criticized Bakdash and asked for internal party democracy, as well as a more favorable view towards Arab nationalism and pan-Arabism. They later objected to the Bakdash leadership's decision to join the pro-government National Progressive Front (NPF) in 1972. Essentially, the choice facing the Communists then was to submit to the leadership of the Ba'ath Party in the NPF, which brought a variety of restrictions, or attempt to function outside the law. The old leadership of the party under Bakdash chose the former option; the more left-wing elements followed Riad al-Turk into opposition, finalizing the split in the party. Turk's faction took the name SCP (Political Bureau), but was also known by the name of its leader, as SCP (Turk).

== In opposition ==
The party was able to operate reasonably effectively at first, although it was never very large, and for some time it negotiated over conditions of joining the NPF. However, Syria's intervention on the side of the Lebanese Front militias and the Lebanese government against Arab nationalist and leftist Lebanese and Palestinian rebels, caused a firm break in relations. The SCP (Political Bureau) publicly and strongly condemned the intervention, provoking a crackdown from the government of Hafez al-Assad. The party then engaged in active opposition to the government, and in 1979 participated in the creation of the National Democratic Rally (NDG), with four other leftist and nationalist opposition parties.

It also, while itself renouncing violence, advocated dialogue with the Muslim Brotherhood and other Sunni Islamists, who would engage in an armed uprising against the government few years later. This led to a harsh campaign of political repression, culminating in 1980 with the arrest of al-Turk and numerous other party members. Turk was not released until 1998, and became known as one of Syria's most prominent prisoners-of-conscience. Central Committee member George Sabra was arrested during another government crackdown on the party in 1987 and was sentenced to eight years in Sednaya Prison by a state security court.

== After the death of Hafez Al-Assad ==
The party benefitted from the decreased political repression of the last two years of Hafez al-Assad's rule and after his death, its members were very active in the Damascus Spring, a brief period of intense political and social debate that flourished in the second half of 2000 and in 2001. During this period, George Sabra, a party member since 1970 and Central Committee member since 1985, represented the party in the National Democratic Rally, a coalition of leftist parties.

Riyad al-Turk was arrested as the government stamped out most of this activity in the autumn of 2001, when he outraged the government's sensibilities by remarking on television that "the dictator has died", in reference to Hafez al-Assad. He was imprisoned, but later released following international pressure.

In 2005, the party held its clandestine sixth conference at which it adopted new rules and changed its name to the Syrian Democratic People's Party, signalling its adoption of western-style social democracy as its ideology, rather than its previous Soviet-style Marxism-Leninism; since the early 1980s, it had been highly focused on democracy issues, and the 2005 conference essentially formalized a development long in being.

The same year, party activists co-founded the Damascus Declaration, a coalition of parties, human rights groups and pro-democracy activists named for their document demanding the country's transformation from a "security state to a political state" based on regular free elections, a democratic constitution, the rule of law, pluralism, and individual rights.

Party leader Faeq al-Mir was arrested in December 2006 after being taped by Syrian intelligence agents calling Lebanese politician Elias Atallah to offer condolences for the death of Pierre Gemayel, Lebanon's Minister of Industry. Al-Mir was charged with "undertaking acts that weaken national sentiment during times of conflict" and "communicating with a foreign country to incite it to initiate aggression against Syria or to provide it with the means to do so" and sentenced to three years in prison. Amnesty International adopted him as a prisoner of conscience and campaigned for his release. He was still missing in 2015.

== During the Syrian Civil War ==
Pro-Assad forces arrested three prominent members of the party, after the beginning of the popular uprisings in 2011; Ghias Youn Soud, the party secretary general, Omar Kashash, trade unionist from the city of Aleppo, and Fahmi Yousef. They were all soon released.

The party joined the Syrian National Council in 2011 through its participation in the Damascus Declaration.

George Sabra was acting president of the Syrian National Coalition from 2012 to 2013.
