= Politics of Ba'athist Syria =

Politics of Ba'athist Syria سياسة سوريا البعثيية
- Coat of arms of Ba'athist Syria
- Polity type: Unitary Neo-Ba'athist presidential republic
- Constitution: Constitution of Syria
- Formation: 8 March 1963; 63 years ago
- Dissolved: 8 December 2024; 22 months ago

Legislative branch
- Name: People's Assembly
- Type: Unicameral
- Meeting place: Parliament Building
- Presiding officer: Speaker of the People's Assembly

Executive branch
- Head of state
- Title: President
- Appointer: Direct popular vote
- Head of government
- Title: Prime Minister
- Appointer: President
- Cabinet
- Name: Council of Ministers
- Leader: Prime Minister
- Deputy leader: Deputy Prime Minister
- Appointer: President
- Ministries: 28

Judicial branch
- Name: Judiciary of Syria
- Supreme Constitutional Court

During the existence of its 61-year Ba'ath party rule, the politics of Ba'athist Syria took place in the framework of a unitary one-party presidential republic where independent parties were outlawed, with a powerful secret police that cracked down on dissidents. with nominal multi-party representation in People's Council under the Ba'athist-dominated National Progressive Front. From the 1963 seizure of power by its neo-Ba'athist Military Committee to the fall of the Assad regime, the Arab Socialist Ba'ath Party operated a totalitarian police state in Syria. (Note: Sources describing Syria as a totalitarian state: Khamis, B. Gold, Vaughn, Sahar, Paul, Katherine (2013). "22. Propaganda in Egypt and Syria's "Cyberwars": Contexts, Actors, Tools, and Tactics". In Auerbach, Castronovo, Jonathan, Russ (ed.). The Oxford Handbook of Propaganda Studies. New York, NY: Oxford University Press. p. 422. ISBN 978-0-19-976441-9.; Wieland, Carsten (2018). "6: De-neutralizing Aid: All Roads Lead to Damascus". Syria and the Neutrality Trap: The Dilemmas of Delivering Humanitarian Aid Through Violent Regimes. London: I. B. Tauris. p. 68. ISBN 978-0-7556-4138-3.; Meininghaus, Esther (2016). "Introduction". Creating Consent in Ba'thist Syria: Women and Welfare in a Totalitarian State. I. B. Tauris. pp. 1–33. ISBN 978-1-78453-115-7.; Sadiki, Larbi; Fares, Obaida (2014). "12: The Arab Spring Comes to Syria: Internal Mobilization for Democratic Change, Militarization and Internationalization". Routledge Handbook of the Arab Spring: Rethinking Democratization. Routledge. p. 147. ISBN 978-0-415-52391-2.) After a period of intra-party strife, Hafez al-Assad gained control of the party following the 1970 coup d'état and his family dominated the country's politics.

Until the early stages of the Syrian uprising, the president had broad and unchecked decree authority under a long-standing state of emergency. The end of this emergency was a key demand of the uprising. Superficial reforms in 2011 made presidential decrees subject to approval by the People's Council, the country's legislature, which was itself dominated to parties loyal to the president. The Ba'ath Party was Syria's ruling party and the previous Syrian constitution of 1973 stated that "the Arab Socialist Ba'ath Party leads society and the state." At least 183 seats of the 250-member parliament were reserved for the National Progressive Front, a Ba'ath Party dominated coalition that consists of nine other satellite parties loyal to Ba'athist rule. The rest of the seats are occupied by independents, who are nominated by the Ba'ath party.

The Syrian Army and security services maintained a considerable presence in the neighbouring Lebanese Republic from 1975 until 24 April 2005. The 50th edition of Freedom in the World, the annual report published by Freedom House since 1973, designated Syria as "Worst of the Worst" among the "Not Free" countries, listing the Assad regime as one of the two regimes to get the lowest possible score (1/100), from the 1970s to 2024.

== Background ==
Hafez al-Assad took power in 1970. After his death in 2000 his son, Bashar al-Assad, succeeded him as president. A surge of interest in political reform took place after Bashar al-Assad assumed power in 2000. Human-rights activists and other civil-society advocates, as well as some parliamentarians, became more outspoken during a period referred to as the "Damascus Spring" (July 2000-February 2001), which was crushed by the Ba'athist government under the pretext of "national unity and stability".

Hafez al-Assad built his government around three pillars, core of which is the Ba'ath party and its affiliated organizations which holds extensive influence over the society through its monopoly over the media and civil activism. Alawite elites who are loyal to the Assad family form another patronage network. The final pillar is the pervasive military apparatus that is managed by the Ba'athist Central Command; consisting of Syrian Arab Armed Forces, Mukhabarat and various Ba'athist paramilitaries, all of which are headed by senior party leaders who directly answer to the Assad patriarch.

== Neo-Ba'athism ==
The Ba'ath platform is proclaimed succinctly in the party's slogan: "Unity, freedom, and socialism." The party is both socialist, advocating state ownership of the means of industrial production and the redistribution of agricultural land (in practice, Syria's nominally socialist economy is effectively a mixed economy, composed of large state enterprises and private small businesses), and revolutionary, dedicated to carrying a pan-Arab revolution to every part of the Arab world. Founded by Michel Aflaq, a Syrian Christian, Salah al-Din al-Bitar, a Syrian Sunni, and Zaki al-Arsuzi, an alawite, the Arab Socialist Ba'ath Party, which was dissolved in 1966 following the 1966 Syrian coup d'état which led to the establishment of one Iraqi-dominated ba'ath movement and one Syrian-led ba'ath movement. The party embraces secularism and has attracted supporters of all faiths in many Arab countries, especially Iraq, Jordan, and Lebanon.

Six smaller political parties are permitted to exist and, along with the Ba'ath Party, make up the National Progressive Front (NPF), a grouping of parties that represents the sole framework of legal political party participation for citizens. While created ostensibly to give the appearance of a multi-party system, the NPF is dominated by the Ba'ath Party and does not change the essentially one-party character of the political system. Non-Ba'ath Party members of the NPF exist as political parties largely in name only and conform strictly to Ba'ath Party and government policies. There were reports in 2000 that the government was considering legislation to expand the NPF to include new parties and several parties previously banned; these changes have not taken place. However, one such party- the Syrian Social Nationalist Party- was legalised in 2005.

Traditionally, the parties of the NPF accepted the Arab nationalist and nominally socialist ideology of the government. However, the SSNP was the first party that is neither socialist nor Arab nationalist in orientation to be legalised and admitted to the NPF. This has given rise to suggestions that broader ideological perspectives would be afforded some degree of toleration in the future, but this did not occur: ethnically-based (Kurdish and Assyrian) parties continue to be repressed, most opposition parties are illegal, and a strict ban on religious parties is still enforced.

Syria's Emergency Law was in force from 1963, when the Ba'ath Party came to power, until 21 April 2011 when it was rescinded by Bashar al-Assad (decree 161). The law, justified on the grounds of the continuing war with Israel and the threats posed by terrorists, suspended most constitutional protections.

== Government administration ==
The previous Syrian constitution of 1973 vested the Ba'ath Party (formally the Arab Ba'ath Socialist Party) with leadership functions in the state and society and provided broad powers to the president. The president, approved by referendum for a 7-year term, was also Secretary General of the Ba'ath Party and leader of the National Progressive Front. During the 2011–2012 Syrian uprising, a new constitution was put to a referendum. Amongst other changes, it abolished the old article 8 which entrenched the power of the Ba'ath party. The new article 8 reads: "The political system of the state shall be based on the principle of political pluralism, and exercising power democratically through the ballot box". In a new article 88, it introduced presidential elections and limited the term of office for the president to seven years with a maximum of one re-election. The referendum resulted in the adoption of the new constitution, which came into force on 27 February 2012. The president has the right to appoint ministers (Council of Ministers), to declare war and states of emergency, to issue laws (which, except in the case of emergency, require ratification by the People's Council), to declare amnesty, to amend the constitution, and to appoint civil servants and military personnel.

Along with the National Progressive Front, the president decides issues of war and peace and approves the state's 5-year economic plans. The National Progressive Front also acts as a forum in which economic policies are debated and the country's political orientation is determined.

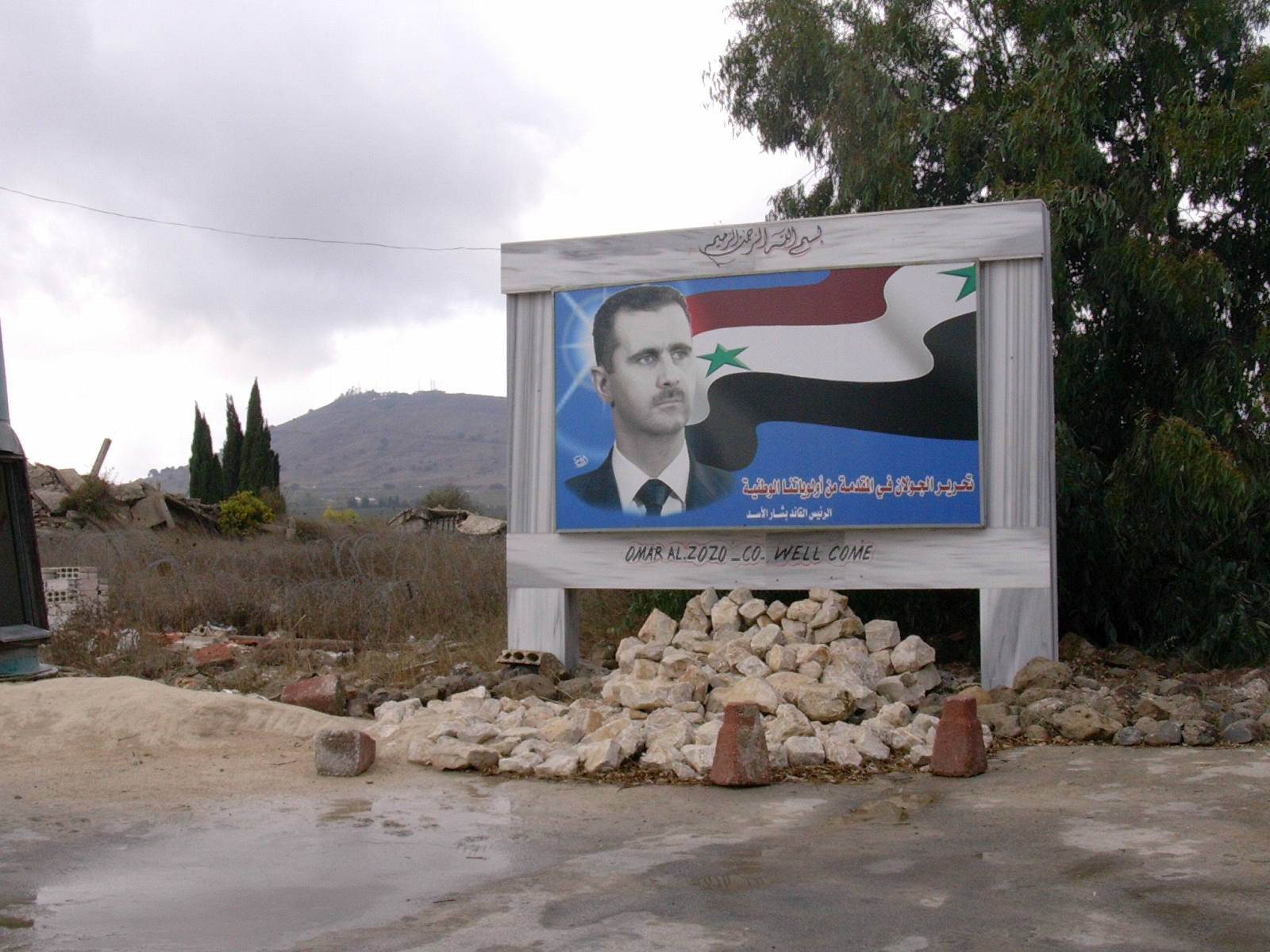
Bashar al-Assad portrait on the UNDOF demarcation line, 2006

The Syrian constitution of 2012 requires that the president be Muslim but does not make Islam the state religion. The judicial system in Syria is an amalgam of Ottoman, French, and Islamic laws, with three levels of courts: courts of first instance, courts of appeals, and the constitutional court, the highest tribunal. In addition, religious courts handle questions of personal and family law. The Ba'ath Party emphasizes Arab socialism and secular Pan-Arabism. Despite the Ba'ath Party's doctrine on building national rather than ethnic identity, the issues of ethnic, religious, and regional allegiances still remain important in Syria.

Political system of the Assad regime has been characterized as a hybrid of absolute monarchy and republic. Syrian security apparatus and the dreaded secret police are instrumentalized by the regime to instill terror among ordinary citizens to prevent critique of the President or organize demonstrations. Political dissidents Riad al-Turk and Suheir Atassi have described Ba'athist Syria as a "Kingdom of Silence" which maintains monopoly over political discourse by seeking the total de-politicization of the society itself.

== Political parties and elections ==
All registered political parties in Syria were participants within the Assadist system, that proclaims its loyalty to the ruling Ba'ath party and are stipulated by the government to advance the interests of the Ba'athist state. Registered parties are constantly surveilled and regulated by the Ba'athist Political Security Directorate (PSD), and were permitted to operate only under the directives issued by the PSD.

The last parliamentary election was on 15 July 2024 and the results were announced on 18 July.

- 2024 Syrian parliamentary election

Party or alliance		Seats
National Progressive Front	Ba'ath Party	169
National Progressive Front	Syrian Social Nationalist Party	3
National Progressive Front	Arab Socialist Union Party	2
National Progressive Front	Syrian Communist Party (Bakdash)	2
National Progressive Front	National Covenant Party	2
National Progressive Front	Socialist Unionist Party	2
National Progressive Front	Arab Democratic Union Party	2
National Progressive Front	Syrian Communist Party (Unified)	2
National Progressive Front	Democratic Socialist Unionist Party	1
Independents		65
Total		250
Source: Middle East Institute
