= Aref Dalila =

Syrian economist

- عارف دليلة
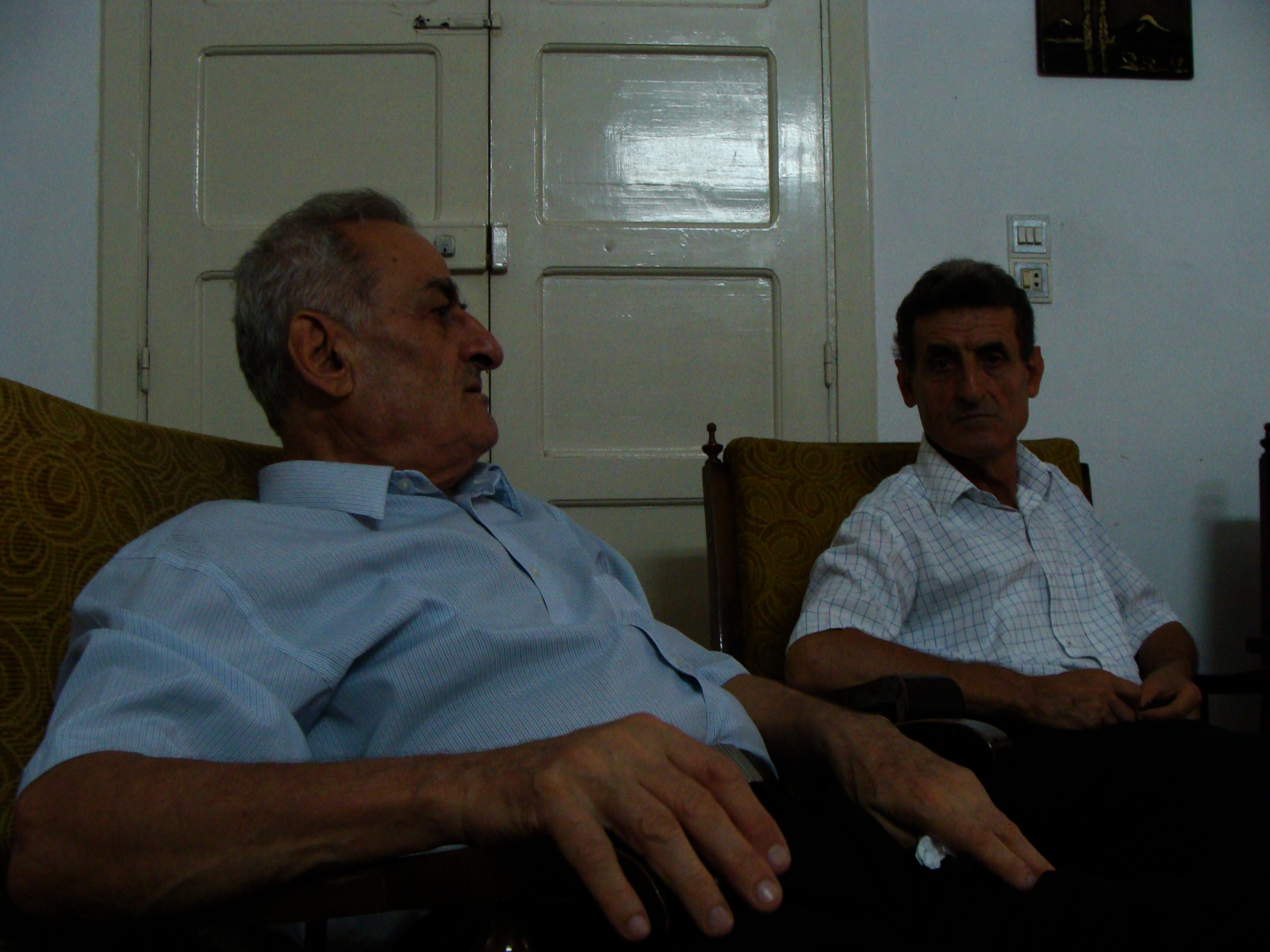
- Aref Dalila (left)
- Born: 1942 (age 83–84); Latakia, Syria
- Education: Moscow University
- Occupations: Dean of the Faculty of Economics in Damascus University (former), economics professor
- Known for: 2001–2008 imprisonment
- Movement: Damascus Spring

Aref Dalila (Arabic: عارف دليلة) (born 1942) is a Syrian economist and former Dean of the Faculty of Economics in Damascus University. He is currently working as a Senior Economic Researcher at Orient Research Center in the UAE. He was sentenced to ten years' imprisonment in 2002 on charges of "trying to corrupt the constitution, inciting armed rebellion and spreading false information" for his political activity during the Damascus Spring period, and imprisoned until released by presidential pardon in 2008.

== Academic career ==
Born in Latakia, Dalila holds a doctorate in economics from Moscow University. In the 1980s, he worked in Kuwait. Later he returned to Syria, taking the post of Dean of Economics at Damascus University. In 1998, however, his criticism of the economic policies of President Hafez al-Assad allegedly led to his being banned from teaching.

Following his dismissal, he ran unsuccessfully for a seat in the People's Council of Syria.

== 2001-2008 imprisonment ==
In 2000, Dalila was active in the "Damascus Spring", the title used for the period of political activism that followed following the death of former president Assad in June 2000 and the succession to the presidency of his son, Bashar al-Assad. During a general crackdown on the Damascus Spring activists, Dalila was arrested in Damascus on 9 September 2001, reportedly following a lecture advocating greater democracy and transparency in government and an end to corruption. The lecture was titled "The Syrian Economy: problems and solutions" and also addressed Syria's worsening economy and called for the abolition of state monopolies.

Dalila's lawyer, Anwar al-Bunni, reported that Dalila was beaten by police during his subsequent interrogation, presenting as evidence a blood-stained handkerchief. Upon making the allegation, al-Bunni was banned from future practice before the Supreme State Security Court. On 31 July 2002, Dalila was sentenced to 10 years' imprisonment.

France and the U.S. objected to Dalila's imprisonment and pressed for his release. In 2006, U.S. President George W. Bush named Dalila in a speech as a political prisoner unfairly jailed by Syria. President Assad responded that the complaints amounted to foreign interference in Syrian domestic affairs. Dalila was later adopted by Amnesty International as a prisoner of conscience. PEN American Center also protested his sentence, stating that his trial "did not comply with international standards."

During his imprisonment, Dalila suffered from diabetes and heart disease, undergoing a heart surgery; both conditions were reportedly worsened by the poor conditions of his confinement. He began a hunger strike to protest these conditions in July 2005. In May 2006, he also suffered a stroke.

When he was released from prison on 7 August 2008 by presidential amnesty, he was the longest-serving prisoner from the Damascus Spring. He had served seven years of his ten-year sentence, the majority of which was spent in solitary confinement.

== Role in Syrian uprising ==
When the Syrian Revolution began in 2011 as a part of the Arab Spring movement, Dalila was active in trying to calm sectarian tensions in his home city of Latakia.

He later served on the executive committee of the National Coordination Committee for Democratic Change, a political bloc calling for democratic reform and opposed to President Assad. In 2012, he criticized the Syrian National Council established by exiled opponents, stating that the situation in Syria has continued to decline since its formation: "Instead of solving the problem, it made it more complicated".
