= Riad Seif =

Syrian businessman and dissident (born 1946)

Riad Seif رياض سيف

President of the National Coalition of Syrian Revolutionary and Opposition Forces
- In office 6 May 2017 – 28 February 2018
- Prime Minister: Jawad Abu Hatab
- Preceded by: Anas al-Abdah
- Succeeded by: Abdurrahman Mustafa

Personal details
- Born: 25 November 1946 (age 79) Damascus, Syria
- Party: Independent
- Children: Joumana Seif

Riad Seif (Arabic: رياض سيف; born 25 November 1946) is a Syrian political dissident and prominent businessman who founded and led the Forum for National Dialogue. Seif was elected to the Parliament of Syria in 1994 as an independent and again in 1998. For several years he owned an Adidas franchise in Damascus. During the Syrian civil war, he was a prominent member of the Syrian opposition and presided for a time over the Syrian National Coalition.

== Career ==
According to Seif, his career in business started with "a workshop for manufacturing shirts in 1963." In 1993, he began "building the New Adidas Company in 1993 ... the first of its kind in Syria", after acquiring a franchise for Syria from the Adidas Corporation.

Following the death of Syrian leader Hafez al-Assad in June 2000, Seif assembled "leading [Syrian] intellectuals and independent voices" to discuss "how to open up Syria's ... political system." The group – which met every Wednesday evening, in Seif's living room and was later dubbed the Forum for National Dialogue – "debated human rights, pluralism, press and academic freedoms, and how to build a civil society," and was the first of several forums that "marked the onset" of the Damascus Spring. In January 2001, Seif announced his intention to create a new political party to compete with the ruling Ba'ath Party. Around this time he also questioned the monopoly on the new cellular telephone system granted to the family of Hafez al-Assad's wife Anisa Makhlouf. Calling the deal "a big scandal that would cost Syria, an underdeveloped country, millions and millions of dollars", Seif "spoke against it loudly in parliament and forced them to investigate it." After a major meeting of the Forum for National Dialogue on 5 September 2001 which several hundred people attended, Seif was arrested. Charged with "defying the state and trying to change the constitution by illegal means," he was convicted and sentenced to five years in prison and released in January 2006. Since then Seif has told journalists that he and his family have been threatened by Syrian Mukhabarat demanding that he not talk to diplomats or any other foreigners, and that his businesses have been forced into bankruptcy; according to Seif, "It started when they cut off supplies for my factories".

Amnesty International reports that since his release from prison he "has been subjected to various forms of harassment and ill-treatment," including the refusal to allow him to leave the country in late August 2007 for treatment of his prostate cancer, "which has advanced to a stage where it is liable to start spreading to other parts of his body without specialist treatment, which is only available outside Syria."

He was again arrested in early 2008 and imprisoned for trying to "overthrow the government", in reference to his work as a leader in the Damascus Declaration. He was then incarcerated in Adra Prison together with other leaders of the Damascus Declarations.

On 6 May 2011, at the beginning of the Syrian uprising, he was arrested again in Damascus. He left Syria in 2012, and joined the Syrian National Council, then the main leadership structure for the Syrian opposition abroad. Later that year, with support from the United States and Qatar, he published a proposal for creating a broader structure that would provide more effective leadership for the opposition and establish connection with the grassroots revolutionary movements within the country. This led in November 2012 to the creation of the Syrian National Coalition (SNC). Seif became one of its vice-presidents. On 6 May 2017, in Doha, Qatar, he was elected president of the coalition.

After 10 months, Seif resigned as president of the coalition, due to health issues and clashes with his vice-president, Abdurrahman Mustafa. He was succeeded by Mustafa.

== Awards ==
- "Menschenrechtspreis der Stadt Weimar" (Translation: "Human Rights Award of the City of Weimar"), Germany 2003
