= Riad al-Turk =

Syrian communist democracy activist and prisoner (1930–2024)

- رياض الترك
- Born: April 17, 1930; Homs, Syria
- Died: 1 January 2024 (aged 93); Paris, France
- Other names: Old Man of the Syrian Opposition
- Occupation: Syrian opposition leader
- Known for: Democracy activist; Political prisoner

Riad al-Turk (Arabic: رياض الترك; 17 April 1930 – 1 January 2024) was a Syrian opposition leader, a political prisoner for about 20 years, and supporter of democracy, who was called "the Old Man of Syrian opposition." He was secretary general of the Syrian Communist Party (Political Bureau) from its foundation in 1973 until 2005.

== Overview ==
Al-Turk joined the Syrian Communist Party while a student. He was imprisoned for the first time in 1952 shortly after finishing law school for opposing the military government that came to power in a coup. He was held for five months and tortured but never tried in court. He later wrote articles for the party newspaper, Al-Nour, and became a leading party ideologue. He was imprisoned again in 1958 under Nasser for opposing the merger of Syria and Egypt in the United Arab Republic and held for sixteen months. Again he was tortured but not tried for any crime.

Turk had for some time been leading a faction within the Communist Party that demanded a more positive view of Arab nationalism, in opposition to Secretary-General Khalid Bakdash, who ruled the party with an iron fist. In 1972, Bakdash decided to merge the party into the National Progressive Front, a coalition of organizations allied with the ruling Arab Baath Socialist Party. Along with supporters on the radical wing of the party, Turk formed the Syrian Communist Party (Political Bureau), consolidating a split that had been apparent since the late 1960s. The SCP-Political Bureau initially negotiated with the government for terms of legalization and membership in the Front. However, it later took a strong opposition stance, especially from 1976 on after the Syrian intervention in favour of the Maronites right-wing government in the Lebanese Civil War. This led to repression of the party, which was stepped up at the beginning of the 1980s when the Hafez al-Assad government felt itself under increasing pressure from both Islamists and the secular opposition. Al-Turk was arrested and imprisoned on 28 October 1980 and held under very difficult conditions for almost 18 years. He spent most of this period in solitary confinement and suffering regular torture. Based on interviews with al-Turk, journalist Robin Wright reports he was "locked way in a windowless underground cell, about the length of his body or the size of a small elevator compartment, at an intelligence headquarters." Al-Turk was "never allowed out of his cell to exercise. Until the final months, he was not allowed a book, newspaper, mail or anything else to keep his mind occupied." For the first thirteen years of his imprisonment he was allowed no communication from, or information about, his friends and family, including his two young daughters. His "only activity was being allowed three times a day to go to a shared toilet." He was never allowed to use it when other prisoners were there but did scrounge the toilet bin for discarded clothing as his own clothing was worn out. One of his few diversions was collecting grains of dark cereal he found in the thin soup he was served in the evening and using the grains to create pictures in his cell. He suffered considerable ill-health, including diabetes for which he was refused treatment. He was released on 30 May 1998.

After his release in 1998, al-Turk was initially not particularly active politically. In June 2000, however, Syrian president Hafez al-Assad died and his son Bashar succeeded him. This was followed by an outburst of political debate and demands for democratic changes, known as the Damascus Spring, and al-Turk resumed a prominent role. His statement on al Jazeera television in August 2001 that "the dictator has died" was seen as a direct cause of renewed repression by an angered government, and al-Turk himself was arrested some days later on September 1, 2001, subjected to a trial widely seen as unfair before a state security court. In June 2002 he was sentenced to three years imprisonment for `attempting to change the constitution by illegal means. This led to international protests, especially given his poor health.

Al-Turk was released after serving fifteen months of his sentence, and resumed his political activities. In spring 2005 the Syrian Communist Party (Political Bureau) held a secret congress at which it decided to change its name to the Syrian Democratic People's Party. At this congress, Turk stepped down as party secretary, but he remained an influential member of the organization. In the same year, he also emerged as a prominent name in the Damascus Declaration, a pro-democracy coalition of Syrian opposition activists and organizations.

In 2011, he welcomed the onset of the Syrian revolution against Bashar al-Assad's regime. However, the country descended into civil war. Initially supporting an alliance under the National Council of all opposition currents, including Islamists, Riyad al-Turk later expressed regret, acknowledging the oversight of ignoring certain violations committed by Islamist groups during the emergency. By 2013, he had been living in seclusion, confined to an apartment in Damascus. Reflecting on his decades-long involvement with the Syrian Communist Party, al-Turk revealed to Le Monde: "Since I joined in the 1950s, clandestine life has been a tradition. My generation understands the importance of secrecy against such a regime. The young revolutionaries were unaware, and they paid a steep price."

His wife left the country at the conflict's onset and died in Canada in 2017. Despite initial reluctance, al-Turk eventually yielded to the persuasion of his daughters, who were already refugees abroad. In late July 2018, he went into exile, passing through Turkey, and eventually settling in Paris, France.

Al-Turk died on 1 January 2024, at the age of 93.
