= Damascus Declaration =

2005 joint statement by Syrian opposition groups

The Damascus Declaration (Arabic: إعلان دمشق) was a statement of unity by Syrian opposition figures issued in October 2005. It criticized the Assad regime as "authoritarian, totalitarian and cliquish," and called for "peaceful, gradual," reform "founded on accord, and based on dialogue and recognition of the other."

The five-page document was signed by more than 250 major opposition figures as well as parties "both secular and religious, Arab and Kurdish." It was considered important that the statement included the Muslim Brotherhood group of Syria, in addition to secular groups.The statement called for a "fair solution for the Kurdish issue in Syria in a way insures the equality of Kurds with all other Syrian citizens".

Syrian journalist and activist Michel Kilo launched the declaration, after the Syrian writer and thinker Abdulrazak Eid had written its first draft. Riad Seif, another democracy activist, was the first signatory. The "five small opposition groups" signing the declaration were the Arab nationalist National Democratic Rally, the Kurdish Democratic Alliance, the Committees of Civil Society, the Kurdish Democratic Front and the Movement of the Future.

Twelve members of the Damascus Declaration National Council were sentenced to two and a half years in prison in October 2008.

During the Syrian civil war, members of the Damascus Declaration who had remained in Syria participated to the National Coordination Committee for Democratic Change while others who operated from abroad joined the Syrian National Council and later the Syrian National Coalition.

== Member groups ==
- Syrian Democratic People's Party
- Movement for Justice and Development in Syria
- National Liberal Alliance
- Arab Socialist Movement
- Arab Revolutionary Workers Party

== Former member groups ==
- Muslim Brotherhood of Syria
- Democratic Socialist Arab Ba'ath Party
- Assyrian Democratic Organization
- Kurdish Democratic Party in Syria (el-Partî)
- Kurdish Democratic Progressive Party
- Kurdish Democratic Unity Party in Syria
- Democratic Union Party
- Kurdish Democratic Equality Party in Syria

== See also ==
- Politics of Ba'athist Syria
- Damascus Spring
- Statement of 99
- Statement of 1000
- Arab Spring
- Syrian opposition to Bashar al-Assad
