= Damascus Spring =

Political development in Syria

The Damascus Spring (Arabic: ربيع دمشق, Rabīʻ Dimashq) was a period of intense political and social debate in Ba'athist Syria which started after the death of President Hafez al-Assad in June 2000 and continued to some degree until autumn 2001, when most of the activities associated with it were suppressed by the government of his son Bashar al-Assad. It started with the Statement of 99 and the establishing of the Committees of Civil Society, then the Statement of 1000 was issued carrying the signature of 1000 Syrian intellectuals in 2001.

== Background ==
Officially a republic, Ba'athist Syria had been governed by the Ba'ath Party since 1963, and by the Assadists since 1970, until they were overthrown in 2024. A state of emergency was in place from 1963 until 2011.

Under Hafez al-Assad, president of Syria from 1971 until his death in 2000, political activity had been strictly controlled, and from 1980 onwards effective opposition activity became almost impossible. Five principal security agencies served primarily to monitor political dissent: a state of emergency had existed since 1963, with military courts applying martial law and special courts trying political cases with little regard for human rights or due process. Prisoners were routinely tortured and held in appalling conditions.

From 1998 on, the level of repression diminished noticeably. Following the death of Hafez in June 2000, his son, Bashar, was installed as president of Syria. Until the Damascus Spring, Bashar had initially presented himself as a reformer to his father’s policies.

== Events ==
The "Damascus Spring" was characterised above all by the emergence of numerous muntadayāt (singular muntadā), referred to in English as "salons" or "forums". Groups of like-minded people met in private houses, with news of the occasion spread by word of mouth, and discussed political matters and wider social questions. The phenomenon of the salons spread rapidly in Damascus and to a lesser extent in other cities. Long-standing members of the Syrian opposition were notable in animating the movement, as were a number of intellectuals who resolutely declared themselves apolitical, such as filmmaker Omar Amiralay. Members of the Syrian Communist Party and reform-minded Ba'ath Party members also took part in debate. The most famous of the forums were the Riad Seif Forum and the Jamal al-Atassi National Dialogue Forum.

The Damascus Spring can be seen as having mobilised around a number of political demands, expressed in the "Manifesto of the 99" signed by prominent intellectuals. These were, principally, the cancellation of the state of emergency and abolition of martial law and special courts; the release of all political prisoners; the return without fear of prosecution of political exiles; and the right to form political parties and civil organisation. To these was often added the more precisely political demand that Article 8 of the Syrian constitution be repealed. This article provides that "the Arab Socialist Ba'ath Party leads the state and society".

The Damascus Spring made a major impact across the Arab world, and initially there was considerable optimism that it would lead to real change. The editor of the Syrian state Tishrin newspaper announced his intention of forming a committee, to comprise prominent intellectuals such as Maher Charif, Ahmad Barqawi and Yusuf Salameh, to edit a new opinion page, but this never came about. The salons debated many political and social questions to a wider nature, from the position of women to the nature of education methods and the Israeli occupation of the Palestinian territories.

In November 2000, the government responded with the release of hundreds of political prisoners and the closure of Mezze prison. In 2001, it returned to repressive methods with a number of imprisonments and the forced closure of the salons, bringing the Damascus Spring to an end. Some of the forum participants and organizers who were jailed for a longer period of time were Ma'mun al-Homsi and Riad Seif who were accused of "attempting to change the constitution by illegal means" and "inciting racial and sectarian strife" and were sentenced by the Damascus Criminal Court to five years in jail. The other eight activists, Riad al-Turk, Aref Dalila, Walid al-Bunni, Kamal al-Labwani, Habib Salih, Hasan Sa`dun, Habib `Isa, and Fawwaz Tello were referred to the Supreme State Security Court which issued prison sentences between two and 10 years.

Though the arrests ended the Damascus Spring, its effects persisted: Syrian intellectuals released further statements echoing that of the 99; some small demonstrations took place in Damascus; and until 2005 one salon, the Jamal al-Atassi National Dialogue Forum, was still permitted to function. The Atassi forum was shut down after a member had read a statement from the banned Syrian Muslim Brotherhood, a Sunni Islamist organization which had rebelled against the government of Hafez al-Assad in the early 1980s by killing dozens of Ba'athist officials, which culminated in the Hama Massacre. The government made clear that any collaboration with the Brotherhood, which despite the exile of its leadership was considered to be by far the strongest opposition movement in Syria, was a "red line" not to be crossed.

== Aftermath ==
Following intense international pressure on the Syrian government after the assassination of Lebanese prime minister Rafik al-Hariri in February 2005 and the release of the UN Mehlis report, intellectuals again grew more outspoken. Pro-democracy and human rights activists, such as Wissam Tarif, continued being active in their call for democratic change within Syria, despite being expelled from the country. In late October 2005, a declaration calling for democratic reform was issued by most of the opposition, including the Muslim Brotherhood, and the government refrained from taking serious action against the signers. The declaration was called Damascus Declaration, drafted by Abdulrazak Eid, and signed by many Syrian intellectuals. On 18 January 2006, the government said that it would release 5 political prisoners linked to the Damascus Spring, in what analysts called an attempt to rally support for the government after unprecedented international pressure in the wake of the assassination. The prisoners were held for a few more days prior to release, "seemingly in a final attempt to press them not to resume their political or human rights work when they leave prison," said Philip Luther, Amnesty International's Acting Director for the Middle East and North Africa, after Kamal al-Labwani's release in November 2011.

In 2011, following a wave of popular uprisings and revolutions in the Arab world, Syria deteriorated into civil disorder and unrest, developing into an uprising against Assad's government. By November 2012, the uprising had become the Syrian civil war, culminating in Assad's overthrow in 2024.

Bouthaina Shaaban, the media adviser to the Syrian president, has presented three sets of initiatives. The first would be to increase the wage of state workers and offer healthcare, thus improving living standards and public support. The second would decrease the regulation of buying and selling land in Syria's border regions. The third would have to address political and media suppression, decreasing corruption and the brutality of their emergency laws.
