= Naseef Naeem =

Syrian–German legal scholar

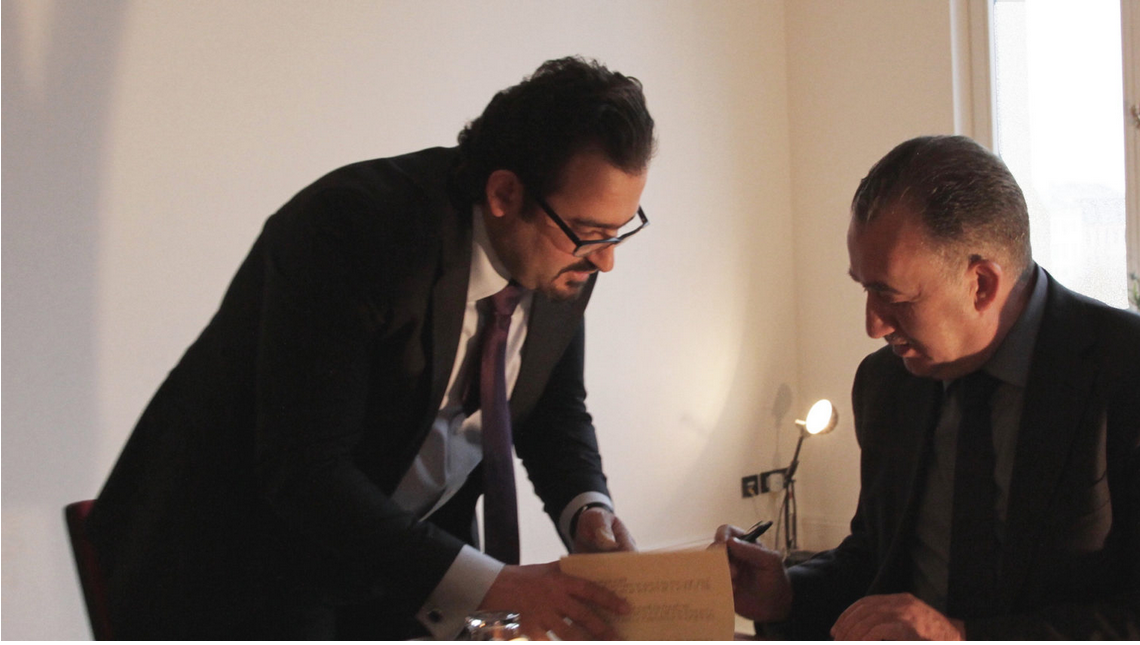
- Legal scholar Naseef Naeem (left) 2017 in Berlin
- Born: Fairouzeh
- Occupation: Legal scholar

Naseef Naeem (Arabic ناصيف نعيم) (born 1974 in Fairouzeh, Homs Governorate, Syria) is a Syrian–German legal scholar specializing in public and constitutional law. He is an expert on legal and political affairs in the Middle East, Syria, and the constitution of Iraq.

== Biography ==
Born to a Christian family, in 1996 he acquired a Bachelor of Law from the University of Aleppo. In 1999 he graduated from Damascus University as a Master in Public law with a thesis on the recent reforms of the Syrian inheritance law. Between 1999 and 2002 Naeem practiced law as an attorney in the city of Homs.

In 2002 Naeem was granted a scholarship to complete his doctoral studies at the Law Faculty of the University of Göttingen (Germany). He received his doctoral degree with a dissertation on the new federal system of the Republic of Iraq in 2007.

Naeem then taught as an associate professor at the University of Göttingen and the Free University of Berlin. He also worked as an expert for international public law with the Max Planck Institute for Comparative Public Law and International Law in Heidelberg.

Naeem became a board member of the German Society for Arab and Islamic Law (GAIR) in 2011 and a scientific editor of the German Yearbook for Law and Constitution in Islamic context. He conducted trainings for judges, law practitioners, and correctional officers in the city of Berlin on subjects related to immigration, Islam and the Middle East. Between 2013 and 2017 Naeem worked for the German Society for International Cooperation (giz) as a project officer and team leader for the German government's peacebuilding efforts in Yemen. Since 2014 he is the research director of the Middle East advisory and consultancy group zenithCouncil in Berlin.

Naeem is often quoted by German and Arabic media as an analyst on legal and political developments in the Arab world, in particular on constitutional affairs or the legal status of minorities in Middle Eastern societies. Naeem is a co-founder of the political roundtable Baghdad Policy Club and a fellow at the German Middle East Think tank Candid Foundation.

In 2019 German National television ZDF published an interview with Naeem in which he identified himself as the chairman of secret negotiations between leaders of various communities, tribes, and sects of Syria that had resulted in the declaration of a 'Code of Conduct for Syrian Coexistence' and the creation of a representative Syrian society body called 'The Council of the Syrian Charter'. The information confirmed an earlier report by the Arabic news daily Asharq Al-Awsat on Naeem's involvement in the initiative.

== Legal and political opinions ==
On religious freedom and rights of religious minorities in predominantly Muslim countries, Naeem considers a debate about the right of conversion from and to a religion 'overdue'. While most Muslim countries protect the freedom of worship to non-Muslims, they do not have legal provisions or even penalize 'apostasy'. In Naeem's view "it has to be acknowledged that there can be no freedom of religion without the freedom to switch that religion."

In several publications Naeem advocates for a self-examination of the state and state institutions in the Arab world. In this context he criticized the, in his view, haphazard use of the term 'state' in the context of the so-called Islamic State in Iraq and the Levant by some Middle East experts. According to Naeem and his co-author Daniel Gerlach the latter did not meet the criteria of statehood.

With regard to the legal and constitutional situation in Egypt after the 2013 Egyptian coup d'état Naeem argued that, due to the fact that the Supreme Council of the Armed Forces had given itself legislative and executive authority, a new phase of ‘military constitutionalism’ had been initiated.

In an opinion article about the Syrian-Turkish antagonism following the 2019 Turkish offensive into north-eastern Syria Naeem suggested a recast of the 1998 Adana Agreement that would include a certain degree of autonomy for the Syrian North-East sponsored and monitored by Russia.

Whereas, in an interview with the German Legal Tribune Online, Naeem uttered reservations toward the work of the Syrian Constitutional Committee from a legal standpoint he conceded that the initiative could be useful politically since it creates opportunities for the Syrian Government, the Syrian opposition and civil society to engage in dialogue.

== Selected publications ==
Der Staat und seine Fundamente in den arabischen Republiken: Rechtsvergleichende Betrachtung, Verfassungsentwicklungen bis 2012 (2019, Deutscher Levante Verlag)
