= The Munathara Initiative =

Political debate

- Formation: 2012
- Founder: Belabbes Benkredda
- Type: Non-profit
- Purpose: Debating
- Headquarters: Tunis, Washington D.C.
- Website: Official website

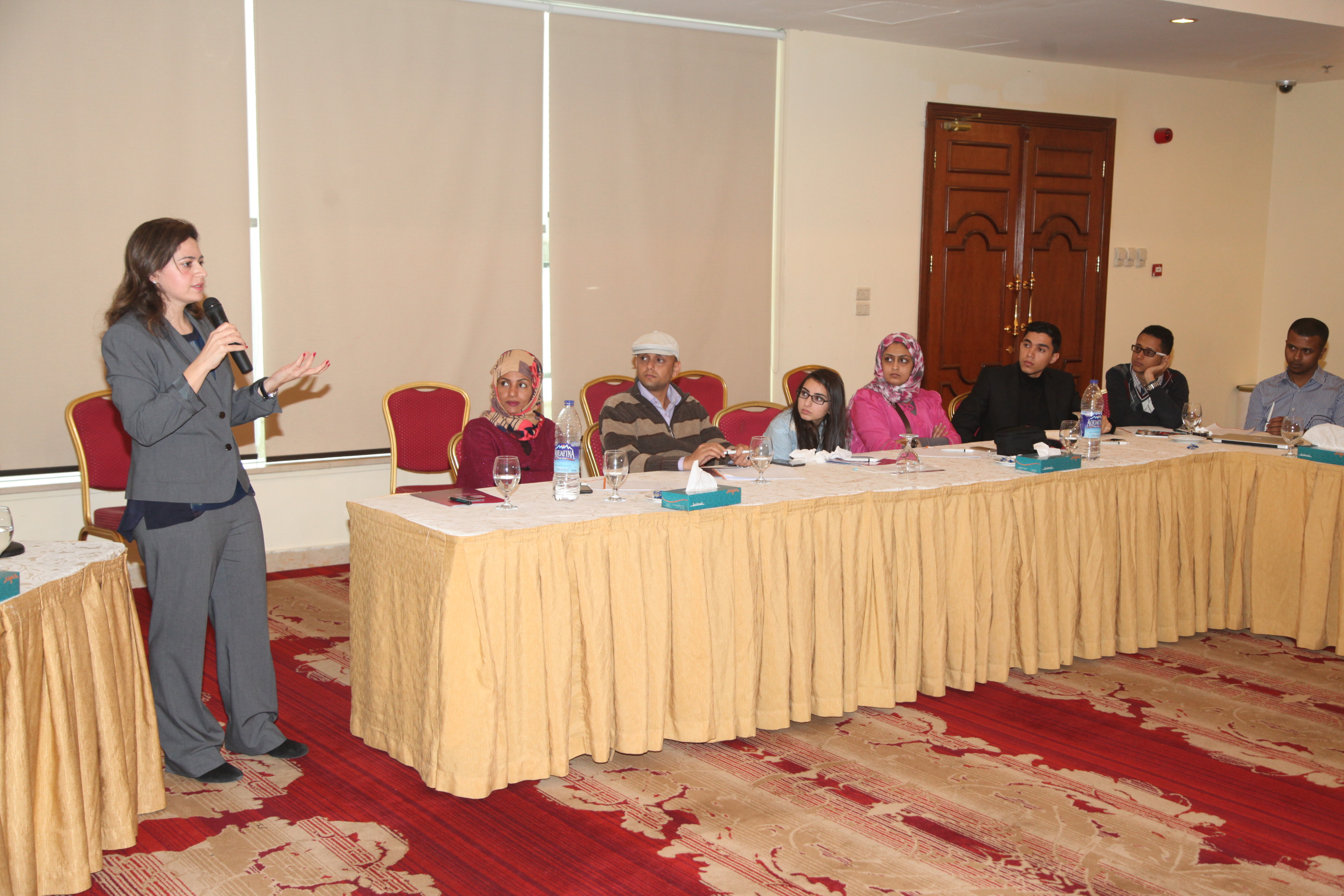
Change-maker Master class

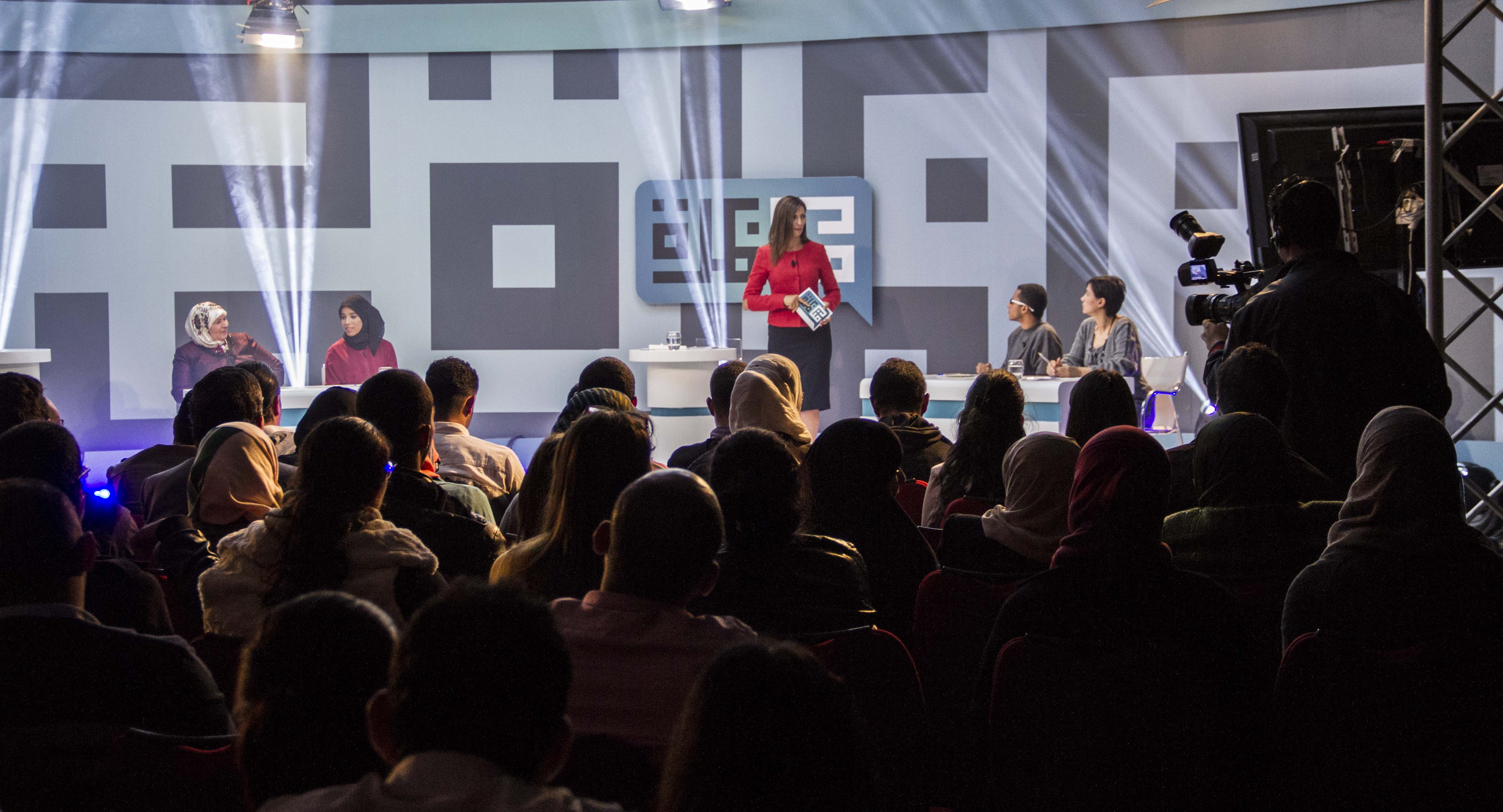
Munathara live televised debate in Tunis, November 2014

The Munathara Initiative is a non-profit debate initiative based in Tunis, Tunisia and Washington, D.C., aimed at promoting debate and free speech for youth, women, and marginalized communities in the Arabic-speaking world. Munathara organizes both online and live panel debates in cities across the Middle East and North Africa.

== History ==
The Munathara Initiative was established in 2012 by Belabbes Benkredda, an Algerian-German civic innovator and government consultant. Benkredda founded the Munathara Initiative's predecessor, Dubai Debates, in 2011, as an independent platform for discussing important issues facing the Arab world. The project was funded by groups such as KAS (Konrad-Adenauer-Stiftung) and Vital Voices. In early 2012, Benkredda suspended Dubai Debates and created a sister organization, the Munathara Initiative, in Tunis, Tunisia.

== Format and functionality ==
Participants submit a 99-second video or less onto Munathara's online platform expressing their views on current issues, and the public is able to watch all of the contributions and vote on their favorite ones. The top eight participants, who gather the most popular videos, travel to one of the countries Munathara operates in to participate in a three-day intense training and the chance to debate the issues face to face with Arab thought leaders in televised debates.

The Munathara Initiative also organizes debate and communication skill training sessions for the youth, and is currently working in Tunisia, Morocco, Libya, Jordan, Egypt, and Yemen while also operating a debate program for Syrian refugees in Turkey, Lebanon and Jordan. The initiative organizes workshops, online debate competitions and live TV debates so that young people are able to engage in debates about current issues in their communities and be part of the new Arab public sphere. EED (European Endowment for Democracy), AA (Federal Foreign Office of Germany), and National Endowment for Democracy (NED) are supporting outreach activities.

== Debates ==
=== Freedom of expression in the new Arab world ===
Alongside two Arab opinion leaders, Mona Eltahawy and Riyad Al-Chaibi, two youth participants, Esraa Al Shaikh from Jordan and Ichrak Mtar from Tunisia, debated a range of related questions that are rarely discussed publicly in the Arab world, including religion, blasphemy and nudity. The debate was broadcast in full by Tunisna TV.

=== Is Tunisia on the right path? ===
This debate featured Ajmi Lourimi, Vice President of the Ennahda Movement, and opposition politician Yassine Brahim, Secretary-General of the Republican Party. They were joined by two Musbaqat Munathara winners Oumayma Theiri and Nasser Benzine. The debate centered on Tunisia's Constituent Assembly, whose 2012 deadline to conclude its work had just passed. Debate focussed on whether the ruling Ennahda party, back in 2012, had taken Tunisia on the right path.

=== Is Arab Political Unity our Destiny? ===
Ghida Al Quda from Jordan and Yassine Ben Smida from Tunisia were chosen by public vote to take part in the live televised debate, and were joined by Palestinian commentator Abdel Bari Atwan, then editor-in-chief of Al-Quds Al-Arabi newspaper, and Bashar Haydar, a Lebanese philosophy professor at the American University in Beirut. The panel's focus was to debate issues regarding the long-term vision for the region.

=== Should Tunisia Separate Religion and the State? ===
Bachir Ben Hassan, a prominent Salafist, argued against the separation of religion in the new Tunisian republic, while Youssef Seddik, a Tunisian philosopher and scholar of the Islamic faith, presented his secular vision for Tunisia. They were joined by Ahmed Ben Hassine and Mayssa Lajmi.

=== Is Foreign Military Intervention the only Option Left in Syria? ===
Arguing against military intervention were Mostafa Alsaied, a Syrian journalist, and Rana Yousef. Also opposing the motion were Iman Shaker, a veteran Syrian feminist and writer, and Yara Khalil, the other winner of the Munathara Initiative's online debate competition. The debate centered on three topics: First, can foreign military intervention be justified based on the use of chemical weapons? Second, if military intervention were to occur, should regime change be its goal? Finally, what impact would foreign military intervention have on the region?

=== Is Tunisia Facing Bankruptcy? ===
A televised debate was planned for 9 October 2013, featuring two young winners of the Munathara Initiative's tenth debate cycle, debating alongside the former transitional Minister of Finance, Slim Besbes and the economist Mahmoud Ben Romdhane of Nidaa Tounes, the current ruling party in Tunisia. The debate was structured around three specific topics: Is economic instability a result of political instability in Tunisia? Has the Tunisian government done enough to make the country attractive for much-needed foreign investment? How is the government stimulating the creation of jobs?

=== Arab Women's Participation: Only through Quotas? ===
Marwan Ismail from Yemen and Mustafa Abdellatif from Egypt, the two winners of the Musabaqa, debated alongside long-time Yemeni activist and President of the Arab Sisters Forum for Human Rights Amal Basha and the Tunisian activist and defender of freedom of expression Yassine Ayari. The debate, which is the first installment of Munathara's Policy Debates series, was centered on whether women's participation in the region can only be ensured through quotas. Topics addressed ideal percentages for women's quotas, the impact of quotas on political representation, and the social changes that would have to take place in order for women to be true partners in political, social, and economic decision-making.

=== #ThereWon'tBeChangeUnless ===
With a new format, and following The Munathara Initiative's model, #DDX solicited contributions from Arab youth throughout the region to upload 99-second videos giving their perspectives on a pressing issue in their communities, using any type of artistic expression, such as speech, music, rap, dance, poetry, or any other form they think best represents their ideas. Online voting determined the top eight participants who travelled to Amman, Jordan to participate in the 3-day forum, alongside twelve of Munathara's past debate winners, and five curated up-and-coming Arab youth. On the second day of the conference, a panel of judges selected the six winners (out of the 25 youth participants) who would participate in the live televised show on the third day of the forum, alongside Arab celebrities and thought-leaders, and become Munathara's Fellows.

=== Lebanon Townhall ===
In late 2021, the Munathara Initiative hosted two consecutive townhall events in Lebanon. The events addressed poverty and the collapse of the medical sector as a result of the ongoing economic crisis.

== 2019 Tunisia presidential elections ==
In 2019, the Munathara Initiative organized Tunisia's first presidential election debates and the second ever presidential debates in the Arab world, following the 2012 debates in Egypt. Twenty-six presidential candidates participated. The debates, hosted on 7, 8, and 9 September 2019, were broadcast on 11 Tunisian TV channels, as well as satellite networks from Libya, Iraq, and Algeria, and Al Jazeera Live. The debates followed five years of campaigning by Munathara and were conducted alongside Tunisia's Independent High Electoral Commission (ISIE). Candidates were given only 90 seconds to respond to specific questions from moderators covering national security, foreign policy, and the military.

Three million TV viewers, as well as 1 million livestream viewers, watched the debates.

== 2021 Libya presidential elections ==
In 2021, it was announced that Munathara would act as the technical partner for Libya Decides, Libya's first ever presidential debates. However, the Libyan presidential election, originally scheduled for 24 December 2021, was postponed indefinitely on 21 December.

== See also ==
- Censorship in Tunisia
- Internet censorship in Tunisia
- Tunisia Monitoring Group
- Freedom House
