= Local Libya =

Media platform by Libyan activists

Local Libya is a media platform created in 2016 by Libyan journalists and civil society activists, co-founded by Libyan expert and journalist Mirco Keilberth. It is hosted by Candid Foundation, a Berlin-based non-profit organisation. The platform publishes articles, photography and videos from a mix of professional writers and citizen journalists covering ordinary life in Libya. Workshops held in Tunisia have been used to improve the journalistic skills of Libyan reporters, on topics including photography, video making and social media. The website is published out of Tunis, Tunisia, and Berlin, Germany with a team of Libyan journalists, as well as Tunisian and German editorial staff.

The publishing platform promotes dialogue between Libyans by reporting on ordinary events across the country, which is divided by the Libyan Civil War (2014–present). The deterioration of the security situation, restrictions on media and reporting, as well as threats to journalists and even abductions, has weakened the ability of journalists in Libya to pursue their work freely. Presently, people living in different parts of the country have little idea about life in the rest of the country, and the platform allows Libyan to learn about events at a local level in areas separated from them. It is also a source of news for readers outside of Libya, who have limited access to information from Libya. Topics that have been reported on include Mustafa Al-Hweiti, a coach who founded a Libyan Rugby Federation and organized training camps for children from all parts of the country, cultural events including gallery openings, and the impact of the civil war on Libya's neighbours, including Tunisia. Content on the platform is mainly produced in Arabic, with some content also translated into English and published by zenith Magazine. It has also featured work by well-known international journalists and photographers including ca:Ricard Garcia Vilanova.
