= Dubai Debates =

Online video debating forum based in Dubai, United Arab Emirates

Dubai Debates is an online video debating forum based in Dubai, United Arab Emirates. According to its website, Dubai Debates offers "a platform for online opinion leaders, pundits, academics, journalists, politicians, activists and all interested users to exchange ideas through videos." In addition to video debating via its website, regular debates are also held in Dubai, bringing together opinion leaders for panel discussions.

www.dubaidebates.com

== History ==
The series was launched in early February 2011, in the midst of the Egyptian revolution. According to The National newspaper, the founder of Dubai Debates, Belabbes Benkredda, "drew inspiration from how opinions were circulated on Twitter and Facebook during the Tunisian and Egyptian uprisings." Dubai Debates was conceived as a contribution to the global discourse in social media, adding a video element and putting a face to the people shaping that discourse. And

A conflicting report in the New York Times states that Dubai Debates was conceived as a reaction to a Doha Debates panel on the motion "Dubai is a bad idea", held on 14 December 2009.

The first Dubai Debates panel discussion was held on 23 February 2011.

== Format ==
A current debate topic is defined and announced through the Dubai Debates website, its YouTube channel, as well as on its Twitter and Facebook feeds. At the same time, a date is announced for a panel debate on the respective issue. Interested users are then requested to submit their video contributions to the topic, which are all featured on the website and on YouTube.

The panel sessions are split into thematic segments, each representing a specific question. All debates are video-filmed and made available after the event on DubaiDebates.com and YouTube. During the panel session, selected videos uploaded by outside contributors are shown. A Twitter hashtag is defined, allowing live discussions about the panel to be incorporated into the discussion. The number of segments was six for the first two editions of Dubai Debates, each between 6–9 minutes in length.

== Previous debates ==
=== Mark Zuckerberg - the new hero of the Arab people? (Dubai Debates 1) ===
The inaugural Dubai Debates topic was "Mark Zuckerberg - the New Hero of the Arab People?". A panel session on the topic was held on 23 February at the Media One Hotel in Dubai. Participants included Mahmoud Salem, the award-winning Egyptian blogger widely known as Sandmonkey, as well as Daniel Gerlach of Zenith Magazine, Al Arabiya TV anchor Mahmoud Abu Obeid, and American University of Sharjah scholar Mohammed Ibahrine. The debate was filmed and widely viewed on the Internet since. The Goethe Institute was one of the first supporters of the debate.

=== After the Arab Awakening: Opportunities and Challenges for a New Arab World (Dubai Debates 2) ===
The second Dubai Debates topic was announced through Twitter on 12 May 2011 as "After the Arab Awakening: Opportunities and Challenges for a New Arab World". A panel debate on 31 May was initially planned to be held in co-operation with the American University in Dubai (AUD), in the main auditorium. On 28 May, three days before the debate, the event was moved to the Kempinski Hotel Dubai and co-operation with AUD terminated without further comment.

Panelists at Dubai Debates 2 have been described as "star academics" and included:

- Dalia Mogahed, Director of the Abu Dhabi Gallup Center and an adviser to US President Obama
- Shadi Hamid, research director of the Brookings Doha Center
- Abdel Bari Atwan, editor of Al Quds Al Arabi and one of only five journalists who interviewed Osama bin Laden
- Tarik Yousef, the Dean of the Dubai School of Government.

The debate was moderated by Matt J. Duffy, a media scholar from Zayed University.

The debate was composed of the following six segments:

1. Is the Arab Spring over?
2. Where is Egypt headed after the revolution?
3. Can Arab and Islamic values be reconciled with democracy?
4. Do Western governments even care about democracy?
5. A new Arab world - new alliances?
6. Will Arab democracy bring Arab prosperity?

Dubai Debates 2 was supported by the Konrad Adenauer Foundation, a think tank connected to German Chancellor Angela Merkel's CDU party, as well as CNN International. There was an audience of 200 guests.

=== Who’s got the power? The future of energy in the Arabian Gulf (Dubai Debates 3) ===
The latest Dubai Debates 3 took place at Knowledge Village Conference Centre in Dubai on 16 November. The panel of speakers constituted Michael Peel, Middle East Correspondent for the Financial Times, Robin Mills, Expert on Middle East energy strategy and economics to Dubai Government and columnist for The National and formerly Shell’s expert on Iran, Kate Dorian Middle East editor covering energy developments throughout the Persian Gulf and North Africa for Platts. The moderator for Who’s got the power? The future of energy in the Arabian Gulf’ was Mishaal Al Gergawi a current affairs and commentator for Gulf News.

The topic attracted students from Abu Dhabi (home of Masdar) at the universities of Sorbonne and New York. Bjørn Lomborg Director, Copenhagen Consensus Center. Author of 'Cool It' and 'Skeptical Environmentalist' also took part via Skype and posed his questions to the panel.

Dubai Debates 3 was divided into the following six segments:

1. The Arabian Gulf: What’s Next for Oil and Gas?
2. Energy for the World Economy: But from where?
3. Renewable Energies- Much Ado About Nothing?
4. Nuclear Energy: More risks than opportunities?
5. How Can We Waste Less Energy in the Gulf?
6. What Will Our Future Cities Look Like?

The next debate is due to take place on 18 December on After the Arab Awakening: Women, Civil Society and Leadership in the New Arab World at Knowledge Village.

== Women, Civil Society, and Leadership in the New Arab World ==
In cooperation with Vital Voices Global Partnership, Konrad Adenauer Stiftung and CNN International, Dubai Debates held its fourth edition on the topic Women, Civil Society and Leadership in the New Arab World. The panel brought together Amira Yahyaoui, a Tunisian blogger, Dr. Ebtisam Al Kitbi, professor of political science at UAE University, and Mohamed Abu Obeid a Palestinian women’s rights advocate and a TV presenter on Al Arabiya on 18 December 2011, for the first debate in Arabic language simultaneously translated into English, at the Dubai Knowledge Village Auditorium. The panel was moderated by Gulf News columnist Mishaal Al Gergawi.

The debate consisted of five motions, after each the audience voted. The motions were

1. The role of women in the Arab revolutions has been exaggerated
2. There should be quotas for women in Arab parliaments?
3. Arab women should choose between family and business
4. The Western model of “women’s rights” should be applied to Arab countries
5. Constitutional guarantees for women’s rights won’t change social attitudes

Video contributors via Skype included Ms Almas Jiwani, Head of the UN Committee on Women in Canada and Manal Sharif a Saudi Arabian Women's rights activist.
