= Ilyes Gharbi =

Tunisian broadcaster

- إلياس الغربي
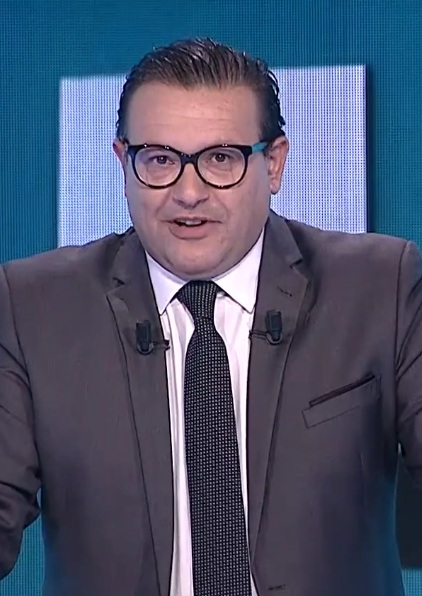
- Ilyes Gharbi presents The Munathara Initiative, May 2021
- Born: Twentieth century
- Education: Institut de Presse et des Sciences de l'Information
- Title: Broadcaster Presenter

Ilyes Gharbi (Arabic: إلياس الغربي) is a Tunisian broadcaster working for the Carthage Channel. Before that, he worked in the Radio in Mosaique FM, Xpress FM, and in several other channels such as Al-Hiwar Al-Tunisi, Al-Watania 1 and Nessma.

== Career ==
He worked for several years at the Tunisian Radio Mosaique, where he presented the program "Fm by Night". Then he moved to Nessma TV to be the first presenter of "Nass Nessma" program. Later, he resigned from the channel. He returned to Nessma TV to become a broadcaster after the Tunisian Revolution. On March 17, 2011, Ilyes Gharbi and the Tunisian journalist Reem Saidi hosted the US Secretary of State Hillary Clinton on Nessma TV. Later, he resigned from Nessma TV in April 2011 and joined the Tunisian Radio Xpress FM. He worked as a lead presenter for “Hadith Al Sa’a” program on the Tunisian National Channel 1. Since September 2012, he has been presenting news on Nessma TV.

He was appointed to be the Director General of Tunisian Television on September 22, 2016, by Tunisian Prime Minister Youssef Chahed. Then he was removed from his position in June 2017. He resigned from Al-Hiwar Al-Tounsi in 2018 and he joined Carthage + in August 2018.

== Personal life ==
He was married to the Tunisian actress Sawsan Maalej but then they divorced.

== Television ==
- 1997: El Khottab Al Bab (Guest of honor of episodes 1 and 2 of season 2) by Slaheddine Essid, Ali Louati and Moncef Baldi
