= Code of Conduct for Syrian Coexistence =

The Code of Conduct for Syrian Coexistence (Arabic: مدونة سلوك لعيش سوري مشترك) is a document that stipulates eleven principles for the future of Syrian society. According to its authors and signatories these principles shall serve as a bedrock for a new social contract between different communities and social groups in Syria.

== History ==
According to congruent news reports by German, Italian, French and Arabic media, the Code of Conduct for Syrian Coexistence was signed in November 2017 in Berlin after several months of secret negotiations between community leaders and notables from Syria and the Syrian diaspora. Its motivation was to overcome the ethno-sectarian divide in the Syrian civil war and to reach understanding beyond political affiliations with the Syrian opposition or the regime of president Bashar al-Assad. Among the founders of this initiative were representatives of various ethnic and religious communities, such as Sunni Arabs, Alawites, Kurds, Christians and, at a later stage, Druze, Ismailis, Turkmens, Yazidis and Circassians. Several leaders of the major tribal federations in Syria (e.g. the Shammar, 'Anizzah, Uqaydat) are reported to have participated in the negotiations.

The original document was written in Arabic; the English translation was published subsequently on a website close to the initiative. The term 'coexistence' in the title of the document is a rather approximate translation of the Arabic 'aish mushtarak which literally means 'living together' and can be seen as more interactive than 'coexistence' would suggest.

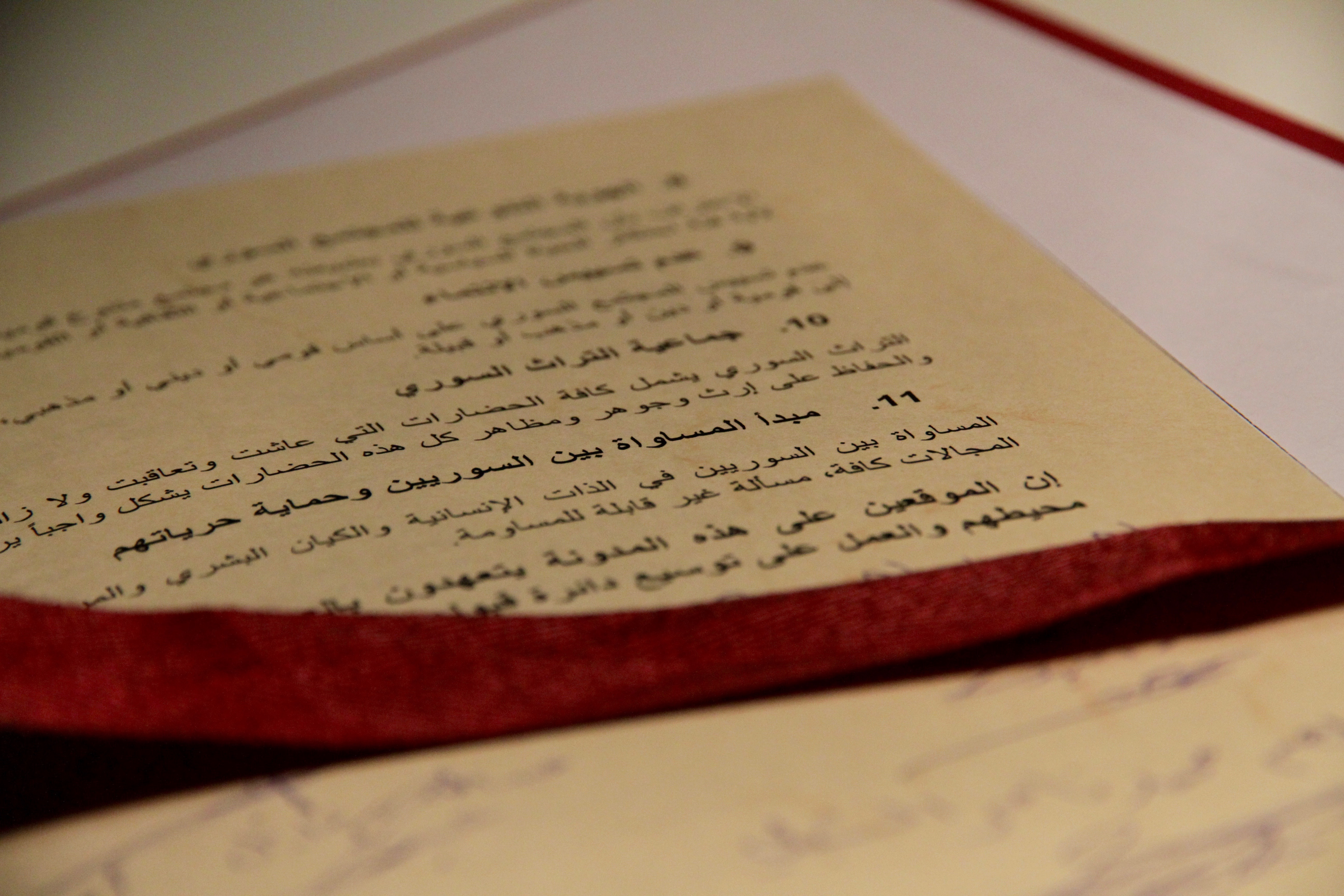
Original document of the Code of Conduct for Syrian Coexistence

== The 11 articles of the Code ==
=== II. Disclosure And Recognition ===
Syria's current state of affairs and its decomposition must be admitted and recognized without exaggeration, false courtesy, or embellishment. Opening up to reality marks the first step of a discussion conducive to address the causes of fears among all elements of society.

=== III. No Victor, No Vanquished ===
In Syria's society, and among its communities, there are neither victors nor vanquished. The excruciating war has spawned losers alone, namely the Syrian people in their entirety.

=== IV. No Side Is Innocent ===
No armed conflict party can claim to be inculpable. Therefore, the parties must concede and admit their respective wrongdoings against the Syrian people.

=== V. Accountability, Not Revenge ===
Accountability for violations and atrocities is key to build the country anew. This shall not be confused with revenge or collective accusations. Accountability is individual. No member of a community shall be judged for misdeeds committed by a coreligionist or member of his or her community.

=== VI. Repair The Damage, Restitute and Compensate ===
To admit the need for compensation of every affected Syrian and restore what was stolen from them, including their right to return to the homes they were deprived of since March 2011. Their claims, needs, rights must be considered and guaranteed.

=== VII. Human Suffering, Detainees, Prisoners and Missing Persons ===
This is a commitment of Syrians to inspect and scrutinize the human suffering that was caused by the conflict after March 2011. The humanitarian issue includes the cases of detainees, prisoners, missing persons and the families of the victims, as much as the injured and disabled. However, cases that occurred before this date must also be taken into consideration.

=== VIII. The Diversity Of Syrian Society ===
To admit that Syrian society is diverse and plural with regard to culture, ethnicity, religion, doctrine, or tribes. No group or community has the right to monopolise or dominate the political, social, cultural, national, religious and doctrinal life in Syria.

=== IX. Depoliticise The Origins ===
Political life in Syria's society shall not be built along any fault lines of religious, national or doctrinal differences. The communities shall hold no prejudice against the origins of either group or person and shall accept every citizen's right to belong and identify him or herself with a respective ethnicity, religion, doctrine or tribe.

=== X. The Common Cultural Heritage ===
The Syrian cultural heritage includes all the civilizations that have previously lived and are still living in Syria. Syria must strive to maintain and to protect this legacy and the essence of its civilizations. This duty is inseparably linked to Syrian nationality.

=== XI. Equality Of Syrians, Protection Of Their Freedom ===
Equality of all Syrians and between all Syrians shall be guaranteed, as much as the right to equality in front of the law and the judiciary.

== Aftermath, Consequences, Criticism ==
The initiative attracted some attention after the Code of Conduct for Syrian Coexistence had been revealed to several international media in Rome in Winter 2018. It was debated on Arabic TV channels and also criticized for the fact that most of the participants that live in government-controlled Syria, in particular the Alawites, did not reveal their names, citing security concerns. Since then the initiators have continued their talks. In March 2019 the initiative announced the establishment of a representative body for the community leaders, in order to be able to implement the principles of the document, to conduct mediation among Syrian communities and to liaise with international diplomats or the United Nations' special envoy for Syria. This body is based on the document, hence the name "Council of the Syrian Charter" (majlis al-mudawana al-souria, the Arabic word for "code" or "charter" being homonymous).

According to an interview he granted to the German public TV channel ZDF in 2019, the German-Syrian legal scholar Naseef Naeem had chaired the negotiations that led to the signing of the document. Among the publicly known members of this initiative are Sheikh Amir al-Dandal of the Uqaydat tribe, Prince Mulham al-Shibli of the Fawa'ira tribe, the Christian attorney Abdallah Rophael (Rifail), the dentist and political activist Mustafa Kayali from Aleppo, the civil society activist Sima Abd Rabbo, the religious scholar Mohammad Habash from Damascus, or Sami Khiyami, former Syrian ambassador to the United Kingdom. A policy paper issued by the German foundation Bertelsmann Stiftung on the Syrian crisis in 2019 recommended that the European Union support the initiative since its successes "show that "reconciliation can take place".
