= Sima Abd Rabo =

Syrian activist and political advisor (born 1976)

- سمة عبدربه
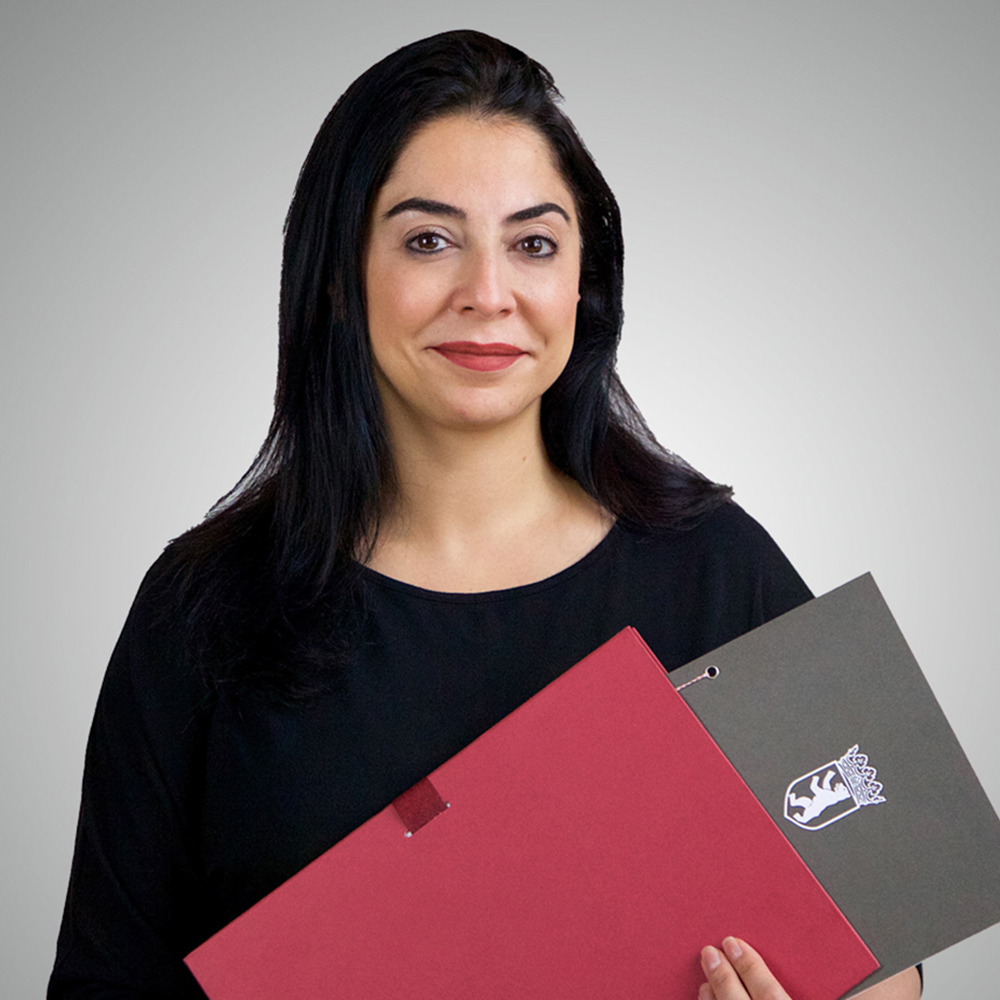
- Born: 1976 (age 49–50); Damascus, Syria
- Education: University of Damascus, Lumière University Lyon 2
- Occupations: Civil society activist, government advisor
- Employer: Government of the United Arab Emirates
- Known for: Public policy advising, civil society activism, translation
- Notable work: Arabic translations of Imperial Hubris and The Da Vinci Code

Sima Abd Rabo (Arabic: سمة عبدربه; born 1976 in Damascus, Syria, alt. Abd Rabbo, Abedrabboh) is a Syrian civil society activist and advisor to the government of the United Arab Emirates on public policies and innovation in public administration.

== Career ==
Sima Abd Rabo studied Archaeology at the University of Damascus and literature and translation at the Lumière University Lyon 2 (France). She worked as an interpreter and translator of Arabic, English and French for international organisations such as the United Nations and the European Union. She translated several international non-fictional books and novels into Arabic, notably "Imperial Hubris: Why the West is Losing the War on Terror" by CIA veteran and security analyst Michael Scheuer and the thriller novel "The Da Vinci Code" by Dan Brown. In an interview with the newspaper Emarat Al Youm in 2008 she expressed concerns about a "major setback" in translation of international literature into Arabic and criticised the trend of Arab translators to use local or regional dialects instead of Modern Standard Arabic. Since 2010 she works as an advisor to the General Secretariat of the Council of Ministers of the UAE, attached to the office of the Prime Minister, Sheikh Rashid bin Mohammed Al Maktoum. She returned to this position in 2015 after an intermezzo as a full-time political and Syrian civil society activist.

== Life as a political and civil society activist ==
After the beginning of the Arab Spring and the eruption of protests and violent crackdowns in Syria that resulted in a civil war, Sima Abd Rabo, who was based in the UAE at that time, joined the networks of the Syrian opposition and started working with several international institutions on supporting local communities. In 2013 she joined the civil society initiative "Network of Democrats in the Arab World" which figured among the international partners of the International Republican Institute in Washington D.C.

Due to her government relations and international contacts she has been described as an "agenda-setting person" of civil society during the Arab Spring, whereas her country of residence, the UAE, is generally seen as antagonistic to the series of anti-government protests, uprisings, and armed rebellions started in late 2010 and early 2011 in the MENA region. Sima Abd Rabo is also a founding member of a circle of Middle East experts called the "Baghdad Policy Club". She occasionally comments on Syrian affairs in Arabic news media.

In an appeal to the UN special representative for Syria Sima Abd Rabo called for an active role for Syrian women in ceasefire negotiations and ceasefire monitoring.

In 2014 she co-sponsored an open letter of condemnation against Norwegian filmmaker Lars Klevberg for presenting fictional film clips about children in the Syrian war as authentic footage. The production funded by the Norwegian Film Institute was severely criticised by journalists and film-makers covering military conflict in the Middle East and investigated by the open-source intelligence network Bellingcat.

According to news media reports Sima Abd Rabo, a descendant of "an influential Sunni family" is a member of the Council of the Syrian Charter, a Syrian civil society body that aims at bringing together representatives from different families, regions, clans, tribes and religious communities. The initiative has secretly negotiated a Code of Conduct for Syrian Co-Existence between social leaders in government-controlled Syria and the Diaspora and had elected Sima Abd Rabo as a spokesperson. Her name also figures in a response from the German government to a 2019 Parliamentary inquiry on the Council of the Syrian Charter's activities in Germany.

Together with several Muslim interfaith dialogue representatives, Sima Abd Rabo co-signed a declaration of solidarity against xenophobia, antisemitism, and for international remembrance of the Holocaust in 2020.
