= Tarik Yousef =

Libyan-born American economist

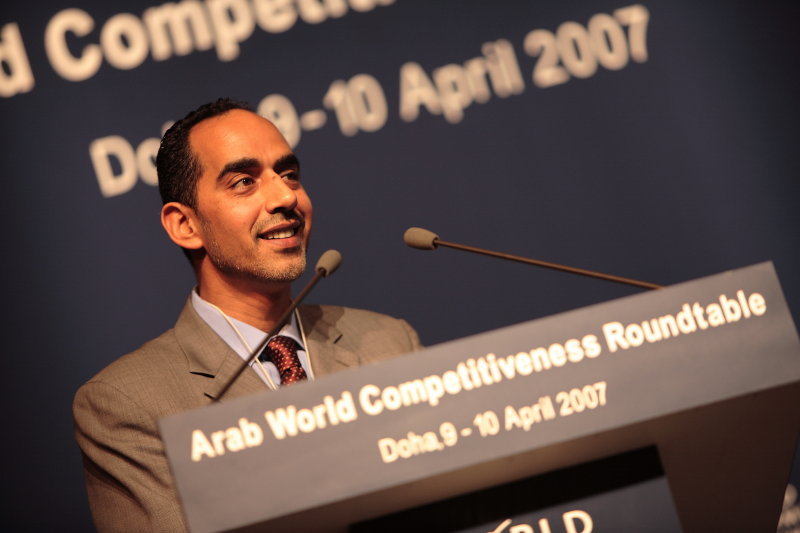
Tarik Yousef in 2007

Tarik Yousef el-Magariaf is an economist who has worked as the chief executive of Silatech and as a member of the World Economic Forum's Global Agenda Council on the Arab World. He specializes in economies of the Arab world.

== Biography ==
=== Education ===
Yousef received his Ph.D. in Economics from Harvard University and his B.S. from the University of Oregon in Economics.

=== Career ===
Dr. Tarik Yousef is an economist and academic who has worked in various academic and policy-making roles. Between 1998 and 2006, he served as an assistant professor of economics in the Edmund Walsh School of Foreign Service and Professor of Arab Studies at Georgetown University in Washington, D.C.

In 2007, he was appointed as the second dean of the Dubai School of Government (DSG), now known as the Mohammed bin Rashid School of Government, a graduate school of public policy and international affairs in Dubai. However, his tenure as Dean was short-lived, lasting only until 2010, when four of the nine faculty members resigned. Consequently, DSG lost its academic accreditation and its affiliation with Harvard University.

In 2011, Yousef joined Silatech, a social development organization focused on youth employment in the Arab world, as its CEO. In addition to his role at Silatech, Yousef has been a Senior Fellow at the Brookings Institution since 2007. He co-founded the Middle East Youth Initiative at Brookings Institution, an applied research and policy program aimed at addressing the challenges facing young people in the region, along with James Wolfensohn.

=== Other work ===
He has worked in the past at the Middle East and Africa Department of the International Monetary Fund, as a senior advisor at the Millennium Project with the United Nations.

He was a participant in the second edition of Dubai Debates, on the topic After the Arab Awakening: Opportunities and Challenges for a New Arab World.

== Personal life ==
He is the son of Mohamed Yousef el-Magariaf, Libya's former ambassador to India and the Secretary General of the 1980s group, the National Front for the Salvation of Libya.

== Bibliography ==
- The Arab World Competitiveness Report 2007
- Navtej Dhillon & Tarik Yousef, “Inclusion: Meeting the 100 Million Youth Challenge,” Middle East Youth Initiative, 2007
- Navtej Dhillon & Tarik Yousef, Generation in Waiting: The Unfulfilled Promise of Young People in the Middle East, Brookings Institution, 2009

== See also ==
- Middle East Youth Initiative
