= The Council of the Syrian Charter =

Syrian civil society body

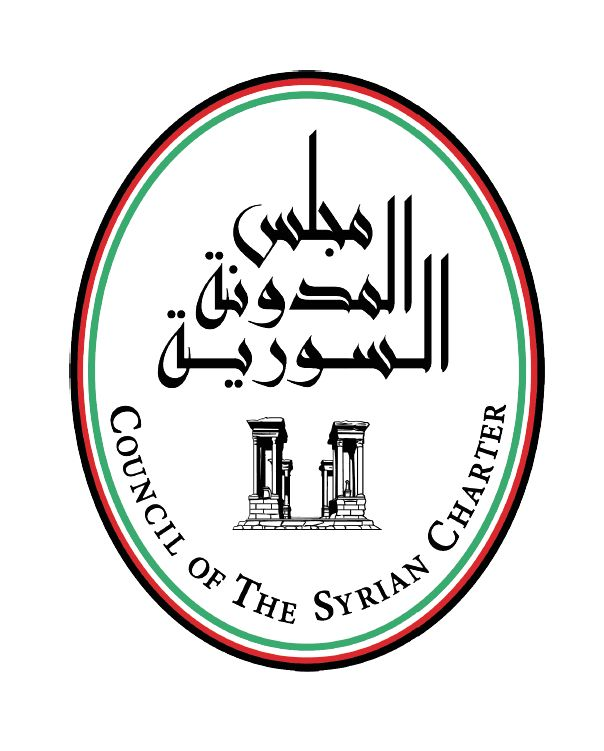
Crest of the Council of the Syrian Charter

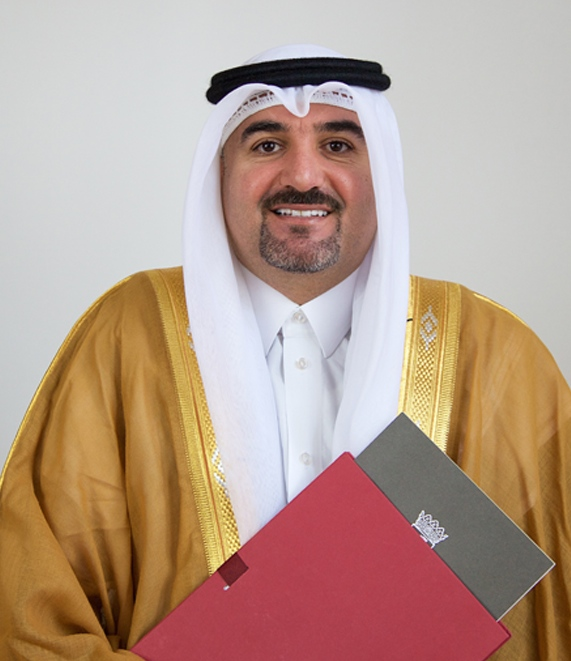
spokesperson Amir al-Dandal

The Council of the Syrian Charter (Arabic: مجلس المدونة السورية, romanized: Majlis al-mudawana al-suriyya) is a Syrian civil society body which officially announced its establishment in spring 2019 to bring together representatives from different families, regions, clans, tribes and religious communities from throughout Syria and from across the Syrian diaspora. Some observers consider it the "most significant" dialogue initiative on Syria with support in Europe and the Middle East.

The Council sees itself as "strictly non-partisan" network and as an "interface" between diverse elements of Syrian society, political actors, and the international community.

The name of the council is derived from a charter called 'Code of Conduct for Syrian Co-Existence' (مدونة سلوك لعيش سوري مشترك), which was signed by its founding members in November 2017. The Arabic word mudawana can stand homonymously for 'charter' or 'code' . The existence of the 'Code of Conduct' was revealed to the international media in January 2018.

The initiative claims to be the first of its kind as it brought together prominent Syrian societal leaders, across political divides to agree on basic principles for a new social contract in the country. The members of the Council consider themselves influential figures in Syrian society, who are able to facilitate mediation between parties involved in the conflict They comprise representatives of Sunni Arabs, Kurds, Alawites, Druze, Ismailis, Circassians, Yazidis, Turkmens and Christians of various denominations.

The tetrapylon displayed on the council's crest evokes the structure of the UNESCO World Heritage Site of Palmyra, which was partially destroyed by ISIL militants in 2015. The tetrapylon symbolises the resilience and cultural diversity of the Syrian people, while the crest's colours and arrangement may allude to the flag of Syria, the first Syrian Republic or those of the 1930s' independence movement from the French Mandate.

== History and Positions ==
Among the council's founders are members of prominent Syrian families. These include: Mustafa Kayali, a political activist and dentist from Aleppo and the grandson of Abd al-Rahman al-Kayali, who was one of the key figures in the National Bloc of Syria's independence movement; Bassma Kodmani, a Paris based Syrian academic and grand-niece of the Syrian independence leader Jamil Mardam Bey, Sami Khiyami, Syria's former ambassador to the United Kingdom; Iman Shahoud, a Syrian female judge from Idlib and member of the Syrian Constitutional Committee, Mohammad Habash, a former member of the People's Council of Syria and religious reformist thinker, Ibrahim Ibrahim Basha, sheikh of the Milan Kurdish tribal federation and grandson of tribal leader Ibrahim Pasha Milli, Prince Mulham al-Shibli of the Fawa'ira tribal federation; Sheikh Amir al-Dandal of the Uqaydat tribe of Al-Bukamal (Abu Kamal); Sheikh Oweinan Jarbah of the Shammar, Sheikh Abdelilah al-Melhem of the Annazah tribe; Sheikh Mamduh al-Tahhan of the Na'im who is a member of the Syrian Constitutional Committee, and several other tribal leaders.

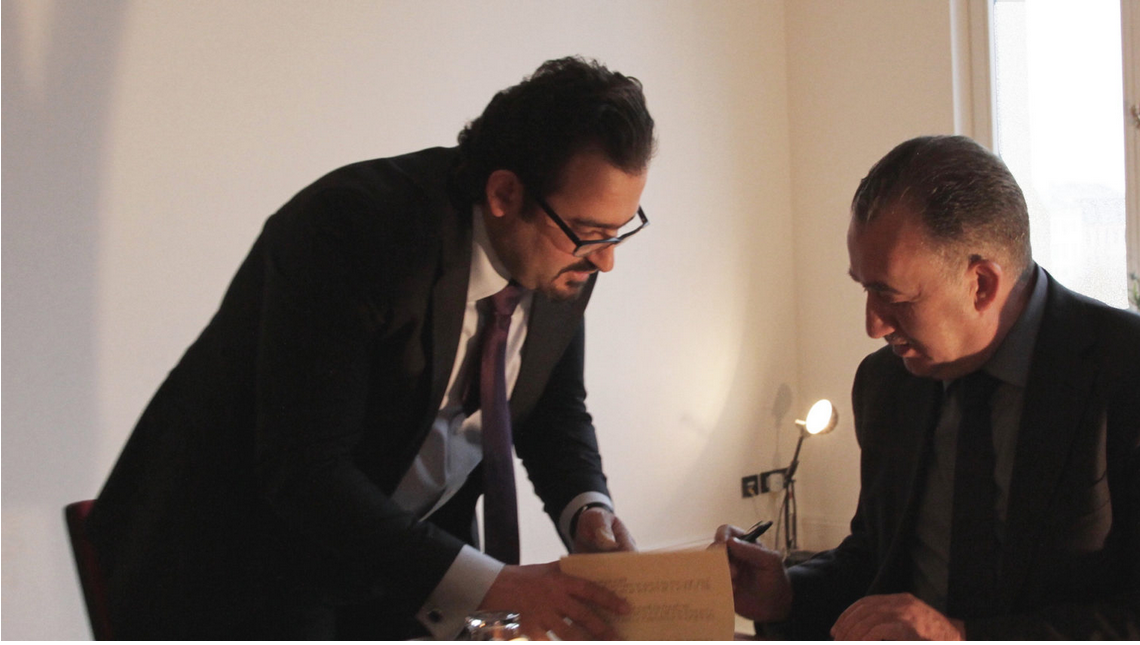
Legal scholar Naseef Naeem (left) assists Syrian political activist Mustafa al-Kayali during the signing ceremony.

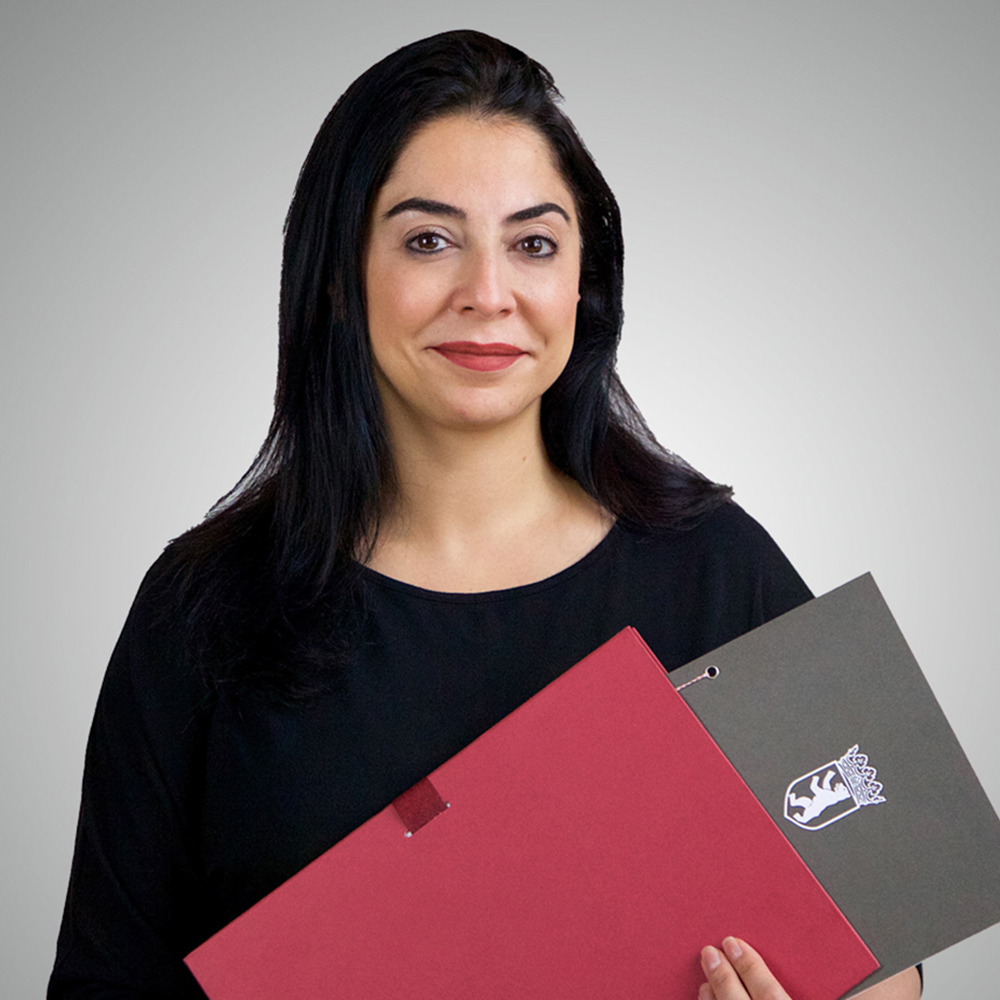
Sima Abd Rabo presents the 'Syrian Charter'

The current spokespeople for the council are Abdallah Rophael, a Syrian Christian lawyer from Homs; Sheikh Amir al-Dandal and Sheikh Mamduh al-Tahhan. Sima Abd Rabo, a former political activist and digital expert from Damascus, served as a spokesperson until January 2020 with Ibrahim Shaheen, a lawyer from the Alawite community of Homs. According to an interview he granted to the public German TV channel ZDF, the Syrian-born German legal scholar Naseef Naeem from the Christian village of Fairouzeh, chaired the negotiations that led to the signing of the Code of Conduct and the creation of the council.

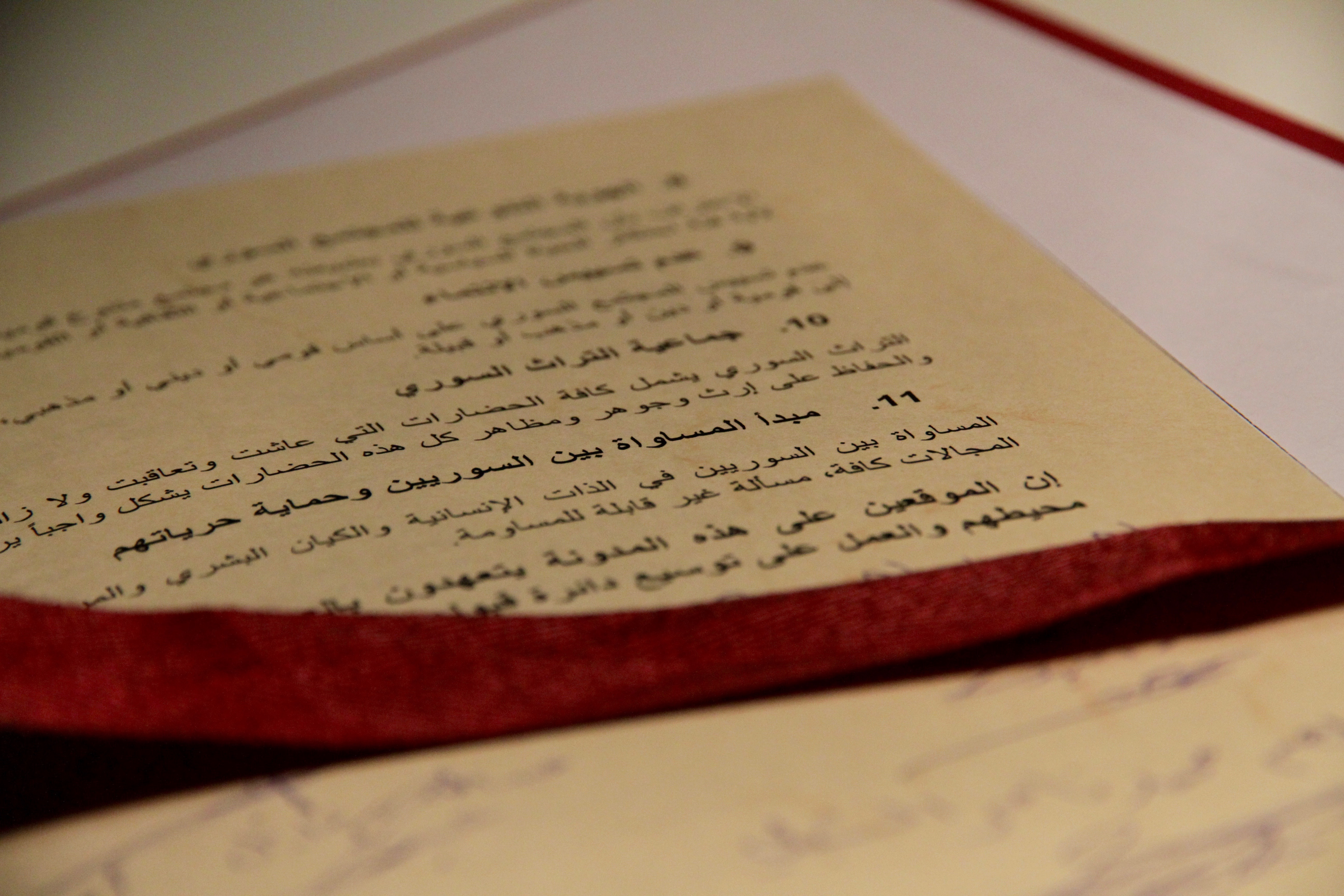
The Original document of the Code of Conduct for Syrian Coexistence.

The eponymous charter, the Code of Conduct for Syrian Coexistence, includes 11 paragraphs on topics such as: the recognition of society's diversity, the individual (not collective) accountability for crimes and violations during the Syrian Civil War; and the principle of 'no victor, no vanquished'

In irregular intervals and based on the principles of the Code of Conduct for Syrian Coexistence the Council publishes declarations, mostly on social, societal and ethical aspects of the crisis in Syria. In view of the imminent outbreak of the COVID-19 pandemic in Syria in April 2020 the Council called on all conflict parties to release detainees "in an act of humanity" since detention facilities would not be able to deliver sufficient medical support. The council also called on the international community to cooperate with the conflict parties and to deliver medical supplies to mitigate against the pandemic on Syrian territory.

According to a report by the German news magazine Der Spiegel from April 2021 the initiative was "gaining momentum" while the official political process led by the United Nations had "stagnated". Sueddeutsche Zeitung reported that members of the Council had met with high-ranking Western diplomats in Berlin in September 2023. The paper quoted a German diplomatic source that expects the Council of the Syrian Charter to play a role in a political solution to the Syrian crisis. to As reported by the Austrian newspaper Die Presse the Council of the Syrian Charter was involved in local conflict resolution in the Southern provinces of Daraa and Suwaida. According to the German daily Frankfurter Allgemeine Zeitung members of the council in Syria advocated for an amnesty for dissidents and persecuted individuals. They also mediate in local conflicts between families and communities in the coastal region and other parts of Syria. The Saudi newspaper Okaz referred to the initiative as a 'gamechanger' that might help overcome the deadlock of political negotiations over the Syrian conflict.

During the night of December 8, 2024, with the events that led to the Fall of the Assad regime, Alawite members of the initiative reportedly advocated for peace and laying down arms in Regime held territories and greeted opposition leaders when they entered Safita and Tartus the following morning. Afterwards, the community leaders issued a statement congratulating their fellow citizens on their achievement and greeted the "new Syria".

== Controversy ==
The revelation of the negotiations surrounding the Code of Conduct for Syrian Coexistence, which were conducted in secret, drew considerable attention from the international and Arabic press. The case was widely discussed among Syrians inside the country and in the diaspora Citing security concerns, several members of the Council have not officially disclosed their names, a fact that several Arabic commentators have criticized. Despite this, various reports have stated that representatives from the Alawite communities in Tartus, Latakia, Damascus and Homs play key roles in the initiative, which is consistent with some of the council's statements.
