= Candid Foundation =

German foundation

- Candid Foundation gGmbH
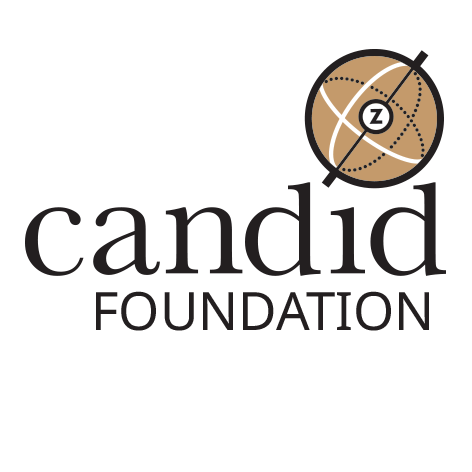
- Formation: 2014
- Type: Non-for-profit organisation
- Headquarters: Berlin
- Region served: Middle East, North Africa, Mediterranean
- Official language: English
- Key people: Daniel Gerlach
- Subsidiaries: zenith magazine
- Website: candid-foundation.org

Candid Foundation is a private non-for-profit organisation working in the fields of intercultural dialogue, media, research and development. It was founded in 2014 in Berlin. The organization focuses on the countries of the Southern Mediterranean, Western Asia and the wider MENA region.

== Mission and activities ==
According to its own charter, the organization enables dialogue between different cultures, societies, fields of expertise. The Candid Foundation's projects "foster intercultural understanding and creative approaches in international development". The Candid Foundation facilitates dialogue between societal actors and supports mediation in conflict zones. Its members, experts and fellows advise international institutions and policymakers. The institution describes its efforts as an "antidote to intolerance, xenophobia, sectarianism and disinformation". In 2016, the Candid Foundation assumed the editorship of the German Middle East magazine zenith and hence publishes digital content in German, English and Arabic.

The Candid Foundation's director general, Daniel Gerlach, is simultaneously the chairman of the magazine's editorial board. In an interview with the German weekly magazine Der Spiegel, Gerlach declared at the occasion of zenith Magazine's 20th anniversary that the partnership between the magazine and the organization was a pioneering feat to sustainably fund the "cultural asset" of specialised, in-depth journalism.

Candid Foundation is active in various dialogue and mediation efforts in the Arab world, such as Syria and Iraq, and the Caucasus region.

The organization established the media platform Local Libya to support independent exchange of information from different regions of war-torn Libya. It also initiated the photography contest and award "Libya Uncharted" to challenge stereotypes of Libya and facilitate dialogue about the country's diverse culture and common heritage.

In 2018 the Candid Foundation launched its first grant programme for reporters and journalists in the Arab world. In 2020, a programme of longer-term grants was established for journalists in Syria, Algeria, Egypt, Iraq, Jordan, Lebanon, Libya, Morocco, the Palestinian territories, Tunisia, Yemen. The Candid Foundation also initiated a series of photography contests on Muslims in Germany in Europe.

In addition its media-related work, the Candid Foundation is active in research and applied science on Middle East politics and societies or the issue of Radicalization. It developed a "qualification course for counselors in the framework of deradicalisation / counseling of the social environment" in cooperation with the German Federal Office for Migration and Refugees.

In 2019, in cooperation with the office of the European Commissioner for Neighbourhood Policy and Enlargement Negotiations, the Candid Foundation co-hosted the conference "EUMed means business" with 100 participants including young entrepreneurs of small and medium-sized enterprises from the Arab world. The conference resulted in a charter of recommendations of startup entrepreneurs and experts on economic policy priorities for the MENA region.

In 2022, Candid Foundation launched the initiative MENA Digital Summer School, an annual seminar for young digital entrepreneurs, journalists, scientists and art professionals destined to the interdisciplinary study of digital transformation with a focus on Europe and the MENA region. The seminar is directed by Ayad Al-Ani, a German-Iraqi transformation researcher and professor at Stellenbosch University.

The Candid Foundation is a member of the Mediterranean think tank association Euromesco and of the Anna Lindh Foundation's Euro-Mediterranean network. In 2025, the organisation took over as the Anna Lindh Foundation's German head of network. It sponsored and co-founded the multilateral policy round table Baghdad Policy Club in the Iraqi capital.

The organization is funded through private donations and project grants from private and public donors. Among its supporters and partner institutions it states the German Federal Foreign Office, the BMW Foundation Herbert Quandt, Robert Bosch Stiftung, the Siemens Foundation, the Stiftung Mercator, and the European Commission.

In 2025 and 2026, Candid Foundation launched a trilateral European-Palestinian-Israeli dialogue initiative in all 27 seven member states of the European Union.

== Members and founders ==
The current associate partners of Candid Foundation are: Middle East expert Daniel Gerlach, who serves as the organisations director general, Marcel Mettelsiefen, a Grammy and BAFTA winning and Academy Awards nominated documentary filmmaker, the German journalists and current Middle East correspondent of ARD radio network, Moritz Behrendt, German-Lebanese TV news anchor Aline Abboud, correspondent of German daily FAZ Christian Meier, Inna Rudolf, an Iraq expert at the International Centre for the Study of Radicalisation (King's College London), and Leo Wigger, a political scientist specialising in South Asia affairs. Among the previous partners and co-founders of Candid Foundation were the German Arabist Katja Brinkmann, who died in 2017, Jörg Schäffer, Belabbes Benkredda, and Asiem El Difraoui.

The advisory board include academics Gilles Kepel, Udo Steinbach, Verena Metze-Mangold, Ayad al-Ani, Christian-Peter Hanelt of the Bertelsmann Foundation, Yasmin Ouberri, and Swiss entrepreneur Heinz Buhofer. The Candid Foundation also entertains a network of fellows from various fields of expertise, such as Iran expert Walter Posch, Iraqi entrepreneur Alaa al-Bahadli, or the constitutional scholar Naseef Naeem. In 2026, the European Union's former deputy director for European civil protection and humanitarian aid operations, Michael Koehler, and Livia Puglisi, chief of staff of Germany's former president Christian Wulff joined the board of the organisation.
