= Amir al-Dandal =

Tribal chief in Syria

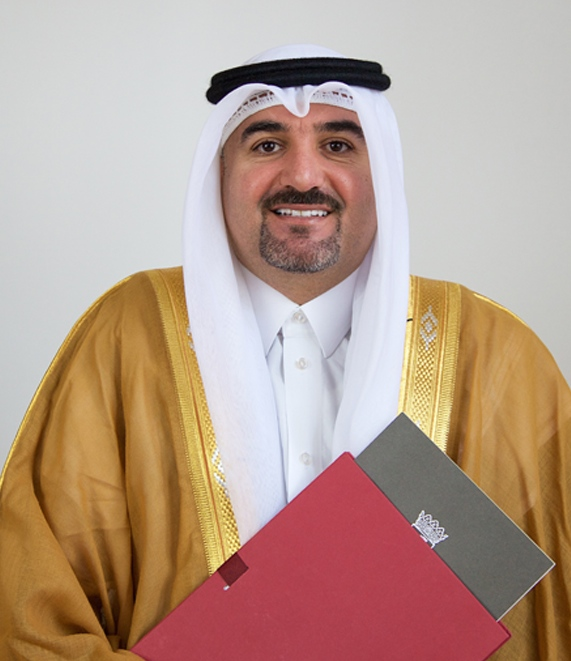
Shaykh Amir al-Dandal of the Aghedat tribe

Amir al-Dandal (born 1980) in Deir ez-Zor, also known as Sheikh Amir al-Mushref al-Dandal, is one of the leaders of the Al-Uqaydat (Aghedat) tribe of Eastern Syria. He became known internationally as a political and civil society activist with the beginning of the Syrian uprising.

Dandal is the grandson of Sheikh Mushrif al-Dandal who led a tribal revolt against British forces along the banks of the Middle Euphrates in 1919. His uncle Fahd Mushrif al-Dandal was an independent politician, elected to the Syrian Parliament in 1961.

== Career and Activism ==
The Dandal family lived in the area of Abu Kamal and had been enjoying strong ties with several Syrian governments, including the rule of Hafez al-Assad. Amir al-Dandal was among the first tribal leaders to publicly express discontent with the way the government of Bashar al-Assad was responding to the Civil uprising that led to the Syrian Civil War. He co-sponsored a declaration demanding "dignity and freedom" for Syrians with other Sheikhs.

He participated in various opposition conferences and meetings such as the Antalya Conference for Change in Syria in 2011. When the so-called Islamic State in Iraq and the Levant expanded into the territory of the Al Uqaydat in Eastern Syria, Dandal became an activist against ISIL and an acclaimed source of analysis and information from the tribal areas to international media.

in 2018 his name appeared among the initiators of a civil society movement of Syrian Sunni, Alawite and other notables that had, in several secret rounds of negotiations, adopted a "Code of Conduct for Syrian Coexistence". The document is intended to lay the principles of a new social contract for Syria. In 2020 Dandal was elected as one of the speakers of the "Council of the Syrian Charter", a Syrian civil society body that originated in this initiative. According to a BBC report from January 2020, Dandal co-authored a statement issued by the Council which rejects the idea of collective accountability or retribution among tribes and Syrian communities for crimes and violations committed during the war.
