= Daniel Gerlach =

German non-fiction writer (born 1977)

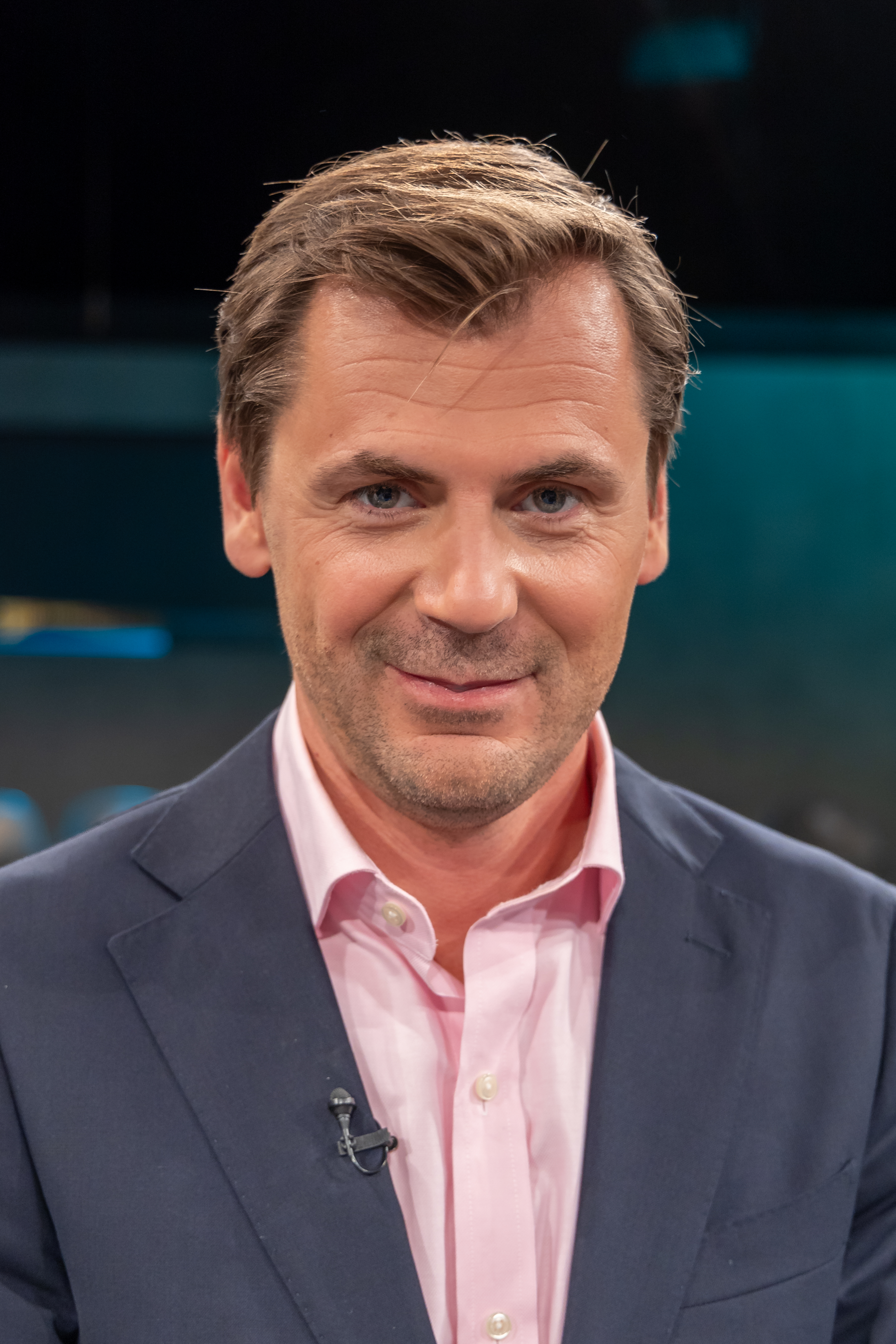
- Gerlach at hart aber fair in 2024
- Born: 1977 (age 48–49); Wuppertal, West Germany
- Occupation: Journalist
- Notable work: Der Nahe Osten geht nicht unter

Daniel Gerlach (born 1977) is a German author, journalist, publisher and Middle East expert. He is the current editor-in-chief of the German Middle East quarterly magazine zenith, director-general of the Candid Foundation, and presenter of a German television documentary series on the history and culture of the Middle East.

== Career ==
Gerlach studied history and Middle Eastern studies. He holds a licence degree from the University of Paris IV Sorbonne and an M.A. from the University of Hamburg. In 1999 Gerlach co-founded and co-directed zenith Magazine. In 2012 he assumed the position of the magazine's editor in chief. Previously, he wrote as a freelance journalist for daily newspapers such as Frankfurter Allgemeine Zeitung and Die Welt and worked as a documentary filmmaker for national German television ZDF, mainly focusing on history and present of the Arab world.

In 2014 he co-founded Candid Foundation, a privately chartered, independent think tank which devotes itself to international and intercultural cooperation and implements media and technology driven projects with countries of the Mediterranean, Middle East, West Asia and the Caucasus. Among his co-founders were the political scientist Asiem El Difraoui, social entrepreneur Belabbes Benkredda, and the photographer and documentary film director Marcel Mettelsiefen.

Gerlach is a frequent guest expert with German and international news broadcasters where he comments on Syria, Iraq, the Arab world and European-Arab relations. He has spoken at international universities such as King's College, Yale, and Princeton, and think tanks and governmental institutions such as the European External Action Service.

In 2016 Gerlach gave the eulogy for the Syrian-French poet Adunis, laureate of the Erich Maria Remarque Peace Prize of the city of Osnabrück. The prize had stirred controversy from Syrian opposition members who accused Adunis of not having condemned the Syrian government unequivocally for its repressive demeanour. In 2017 German and international media reported that Gerlach's name had appeared on a travel ban list of Syrian state security.

According to German news anchor Claus Kleber, Gerlach is a "leading expert" on the Middle East in Germany. Gerlach is a frequent contributor to German language media outlets, including Deutsche Welle, Deutschlandfunk, Die Welt, ZDF, Tagesschau, Der Spiegel Die Tageszeitung, Tagesspiegel, Neue Zürcher Zeitung, Luzerner Zeitung, and SRF. Gerlach has also featured in several international publications, including The New York Times.

Since 2022, Gerlach hosts a series of documentary films on Middle Eastern history, culture, and archaeology for German public broadcaster ZDF.

== Positions ==
In his book about the Syrian government and the sectarian element of the armed conflict, Gerlach makes reference to the method of French sociologist Michel Seurat. He argues that the essential core of Syrian government was not simply a group of people around the Assad family, but a distinct logic of thinking and behaviour, an ideology described as implicitly sectarian.

In 2014, Gerlach suggested that an international diplomatic initiative of Western countries should engage Russia and oblige it to assume the role of a protective force for parts of Syria in order to untangle the interests of international stakeholders and to prevent unilateral action.

In an article published simultaneously in English, German, and Russian in 2017, Gerlach suggested that Saudi Arabia, a regional power that officially supported armed insurgents in Syria, had secretly endorsed or even "encouraged" the 2015 Russian military intervention in support of the Syrian regime. This analysis was corroborated in 2020 by news media reports stating that Saudi crown prince Mohammed bin Salman had secretly encouraged Russia to intervene and, in this way, "angered" CIA director John Brennan.

With regard to the so-called Islamic State, its strategy of displaying acts of extreme violence, Gerlach argues that there was nothing intrinsically “Islamic” about it. He suggests to also study analogies with Latin American drug cartels. In an article co-authored with Naseef Naeem, a Syrian-born associate professor of state and constitutional law, both reject the use of the terms “state” or “state building” project by media and academics on IS. They argue that the organisation's project lacked key elements of statehood and, instead, suggest to call it a warfaring occupying force with an “imperial” ideology.

In an article about the ideology of resistance and the operational features of Shia militias and the Iraqi Hashd al-Shaabi Gerlach criticises the attribution of “jihadist” and, as opposed to groups like Al-Qaida or the Islamic State, suggests to qualify them as “muqawamist” instead (from the Arabic muqawama for “resistance”).

In a contribution for the Washington Institute for Near East Policy about the war for Syria and the escalation of violence in Idlib in 2019, Gerlach argued that sectarianism and prejudice against elements of the population were fueling certain war tactics and that, therefore, community leaders in Syria were an often-overlooked stakeholder in shaping the country's future and in mitigating against the sectarian divide.

In his 2025 book on the history of secret diplomacy in the Middle East, Gerlach argues that the region has a long and often overlooked tradition of peace-building and multilateral approaches. In an essay for zenith Magazine, he described the birth of an independent Palestinian state as an 'inevitable result' of the post-Ottoman order and the decolonisation of the region. Gerlach calls Israel, Palestine, Lebanon, and Syria the 'Four Sisters of the Levant' whose respective state-building is not yet complete and whose stability and prosperity depend on each other.

== Selected publications ==
- Die Kunst des Friedens: Eine andere Geschichte des Nahen Ostens (C. Bertelsmann 2025)
- Die letzten Geheimnisse des Orients: Meine Entdeckungsreise zu den Wurzeln unserer Kultur (C. Bertelsmann 2022)
- Das neue Libyen: Geschichten aus einem unbekannten Land (Deutscher Levante Verlag, 2020)
- Der Nahe Osten geht nicht unter: Die arabische Welt vor ihrer historischen Chance (Edition Körber, 2019)
- Herrschaft über Syrien: Macht und Manipulation unter Assad (Edition Körber, 2015)

== Selected documentaries ==
- 2009: Islam and the West
- 2010: Persia: Legacy of the Flames
- 2011: Planet Egypt (4 episodes): Birth of an Empire, Pharaohs at War, Temples of Power, Quest for Eternity
- 2025: ZDF Terra X: Rückkehr nach Syrien
