= Bassma Kodmani =

Syrian academic (1958–2023)

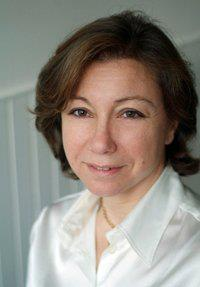
Kodmani in 2012

Bassma Kodmani (Arabic: بسمة قضماني; 29 April 1958 – 2 March 2023) was a Syrian academic and political activist. She was the founder and executive director of the Arab Reform Initiative, a network of independent Arab research and policy institutes working to promote democracy in the Arab world. During the Syrian civil war, she was spokesperson of the Syrian National Council.

Until 2011, she was the senior advisor to the director of the academic program at the Académie Diplomatique Internationale. From 2007 to 2009, she was a senior advisor on international cooperation to the French national research council and an associate researcher at the Centre d’études et de recherches internationales (CERI-Sciences Po) from 2006 to 2007. She also was a senior visiting fellow at the Collège de France from 2005 to 2006.

From 1981 to 1998, she set up and directed the Middle East Program at the Institut Français des Relations Internationales (IFRI) in Paris and was an associate professor of international relations at the University of Paris 1 Pantheon-Sorbonne and University of Paris-Est Marne-la-Vallée.

Kodmani led the Governance and International Cooperation program for the Middle East and North Africa at the Ford Foundation. She then became a senior adviser on international cooperation to the French National Centre for Scientific Research (CNRS).

Kodmani was also the recipient of the 2011 Raymond Georis Prize for Innovative Philanthropy established by the Mercator Fund “a prize honouring outstanding contributions to European philanthropy” for the role of her organization the Arab Reform initiative in promoting democracy in the context of the Arab Spring.

Kodmani died on 2 March 2023, at the age of 64.

Bassma Kodmani held a doctorate degree of political science from the Institut d'Etudes Politiques de Paris. She authored multiple books, academic papers and articles in French and English on the issue of the democratization in the Arab world, the Palestinian diaspora, the Israeli-Palestinian conflict, the strategies of Arab states towards Islamist movements, political change in North Africa and regional security. Her last book to date is "Abattre les Murs" (Breaking the Walls) published in 2008.

== Early life ==
Bassma Kodmani was born in Damascus, Syria in 1958. As a child she attended the "Ecole Franciscaine", a French Christian school in Damascus. Her father used to work at the Syrian Ministry of Foreign Affairs as a diplomat. Following the defeat of the 1967 war, he had a skirmish with the Minister of Foreign Affairs and was subsequently jailed for 6 months. This prompted him to leave Syria with his family and move to Lebanon where they stayed for 3 years from 1968 to 1971. In 1971, they moved in London where Bassma Kodmani's father had found a job at the United Nations.

== Education and academic achievements ==
Bassma Kodmani studied at the Institut d'Etudes Politiques de Paris where she obtained a PhD degree in Political Science. Because of her feeling of belonging to the Arab world, she dismissed a career in French foreign service and decided to focus on the study of international relations. She worked at the Institut Français des Relations Internationales (IFRI) in Paris where she set up and directed the Middle East Program from 1981 to 1998. She realized at that point that she was no longer interested in simply studying the Arab world as a topic of research. She wanted to "contribute to its future." She spent seven years living in Egypt where she led the Governance and International Cooperation program for the Middle East and North Africa at the Ford Foundation.

In 2005, Bassma Kodmani became the executive director of the Arab Reform Initiative, a network of think-tanks and policy institutes devoted to the study of the Arab world.

From 2005 to 2006, she also was a senior visiting fellow at the Collège de France. From 2007 to 2009, she was a senior advisor on international cooperation to the French national research council and an associate researcher at the Centre d’études et de recherches internationales (CERI-Sciences Po) from 2006 to 2007.

Bassma Kodmani defined herself as an "Arabic woman, with a Western intellectual formation (...) and raised according to the ethics of Islam."

In 2012, she attended the Bilderberg conference as an 'international' participant.

=== The Arab Reform Initiative ===
In 2005, Bassma Kodmani established the Arab Reform Initiative (ARI), a consortium of independent Arab research and policy institutes, with partners from the United States and Europe. The Arab Reform Initiative was established at the initiative of four directors of Arab policy research institutes who chose to partner with four European and a single US think tank, US/Middle East Project. Through policy recommendations and research, the ARI has the stated aim of promoting reform and democratization in the Arab world. It hopes to initiate a dialogue between policy institutes in the Arab world in order to "advance the understanding of decision-makers and opinion leaders on issues of reform in the Arab world." In addition, the Arab Reform Initiative "aims to raise awareness in the Arab world about successful transitions to democracy in other parts of the world, and of the mechanisms and compromises which made such successful transitions possible."

The ARI network includes the following members: the Hellenic Foundation for European and Foreign Policy (ELIAMEP), the European Institute for Research on Euro-Arab Cooperation (MEDEA), the European Institute for Security Studies, the Center for Strategic Studies, the Fundacion Para Las Relaciones Internacionales y El Dialogo Exterior, the Sudanese Studies Center, The Arab Reform Forum, the US/Middle East Project, Al-Ahram Center for Political and Strategic Studies (ACPSS), the Centre for European Reform, the King Faisal Center for Research and Islamic Studies, the Lebanese Center for Policy Studies, the Persian Gulf Research Center and the Palestinian Center for Policy and Survey Research.

=== Academic work ===
Bassma Kodmani wrote many books on the Middle East and the Arab world in English and French. Some of her publications topics are: democratization in the Arab world, political change in the Maghreb, the Palestinian Diaspora, the strategies of Arab states with Islamist movements, regional security and the Gulf.

Kodmani also worked as "a consultant to various international corporations, government agencies, European institutions and ministries, and was a frequent commentator on international radio and television networks and authors regular op-eds in the Arab, French and international press."

== Political role in the 2011–2012 Syrian uprising ==
After the start of the Syrian revolution, Bassma Kodmani took a prominent role in the opposition against the government of Bashar al-Assad. She regularly wrote articles welcoming the protesters' call for democracy in Syria and denouncing "the fierce repression of Bashar al-Assad and its use of a sectarian strategy to undermine the uprising".

In July 2011, Bassma Kodmani wrote in an op-ed published in the New York Times arguing that the key to the success of the Syrian revolt lies in the siding of the Alawi population as whole (and not the army) with the revolution. She suggested that the opposition should offer guarantees of protection to the Alawi community as a way to encourage them to “withdraw its support” to the Assad government.

=== The Syrian National Council ===
On September 15, 2011, the creation of the Syrian National Council was formally announced. Bassma Kodmani was the spokesperson of the Syrian National Council, a political umbrella organization uniting diverse opposition groups inside and outside Syria. She was also a member of the executive committee along with other members of the Syrian opposition such as Burhan Ghalioun, Abdulbaset Sieda, Abdulahad Astepho, Haitham al-Maleh, Ahmed Ramadan, Samir Nashar and Mohammad Faruq Tayfur. She was affiliated to the National Bloc.

In its mission statement, the Syrian National Council presents itself as a “political umbrella organization” that “seeks to represent the Syrian revolution politically embody its aspirations in toppling the regime; achieve democratic change; and build a modern, democratic, and civil state.” It hopes to unite the efforts of the opposition and the revolutionary committees in toppling the Assad regime and ensuring a transition of Syria towards democracy. It also hopes to form a transitional government to oversee the affairs of the state in the event of a regime fall.

On 28 October 2011, she expressed her worries about the Libyan scenario (with the violent overthrow of Muammar Gaddafi) being reiterated in Syria. She warned against a militarization of the conflict and insisted that the revolution was not sectarian but included all factions of the Syrian society. She also put her hopes in the multiplications of acts of civil disobedience as they "can be generalized, developed and expanded. This is because they are peaceful. These will be supported by businesses and others who are afraid of the costs of war. Peaceful methods are generalizable."

However, Bassma Kodmani came to review her position on the peaceful nature of the uprising. According to her, the opposition is now faced with two options: "greater militarization of local resistance or foreign intervention." With China and Russia's veto impeding a United Nations Security Council resolution, the international intervention scenario is unlikely to unfold. As a result, in the context of increasing defections in the military and the escalating violence in Syria, the Syrian National Council (SNC) and the Free Syrian Army (FSA) struck a deal in January 2012, recognizing the units of anti-government rebels fighting in Syria. She stated as a spokesperson of the Syrian National Council (SNC) that it was the duty of the opposition "to assist the rebels." While she asserted that the SNC would not provide arms directly to the Free Syrian Army (FSA), it will provide funds to "keep the FSA afloat." For this reason, donations can be made on the SNC website. She estimated that the number of rebels was, in late 2011, somewhere in between 20,000 and 30,000. According to her, the main challenge is to overcome the inner tensions within the FSA between those who defected early such as Colonel Riad al-Asaad and more senior officers, as well as to coordinate the actions of the FSA into a main "strategic objective." This is all the more difficult given the fact that rebels are not concentrated in one geographical area (such as Benghazi in Libya) but are spread out all across the territory.

In February 2012, a controversy erupted over Bassma Kodmani's participation in a French televised program featuring Israeli writers back in 2008. The video featured on YouTube shows selected excerpts of the program and accuses Bassma Kodmani of defending Israel for stating that "we need Israel in the region", omitting the rest of the sentence that said "provided it fixes its borders and sets the terms of its relationships with its neighbours". In response to these accusations, Bassma Kodmani published a response explaining that the video was fabricated in order to hurt her reputation as it took her answers out of context and cut everything that she said in defense of the rights of Arabs, Muslims and Palestinians. She described this video as nothing more than an attempt of the government to destabilize the Syrian National Council.

In July 2013, she signed an open letter to French President François Hollande, calling for the establishment of a no-fly zone in Syria. In 2022, Kodmani publicly appeared as member of the Council of the Syrian Charter, a Syrian civil society initiative of families, tribes, and community leaders from both government-held Syria and the Syrian diaspora.

== Death ==
Kodmani died on 2 March 2023 in Paris, France after a battle with breast cancer.

== Honors ==
- Knight of the Legion of Honour (2012).
