= Sami Khiyami =

Syrian diplomat

Sami Khiyami سامي الخيمي
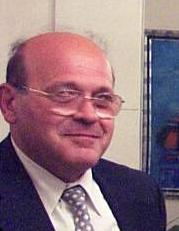

Syrian Ambassador to the United Kingdom
- In office July 2004 – March 2012
- Preceded by: Mouafak Nassar

Personal details
- Born: August 28, 1948 (age 77) Damascus, Syria
- Spouse: Yamna Farhan
- Profession: Politician

Sami Khiyami (Arabic: سامي خيامي) is a Syrian diplomat, former Syrian ambassador to London.

== Background ==
Born on 28 August 1948, Khiyami studied Electrical Engineering at the American University of Beirut in Lebanon, and Claude Bernard University Lyon 1, France. An electronics expert by training, he has held a number of professional roles, including senior advisor to the Syrian banking industry and a member of the board of Syrian Arab Airlines. He speaks Arabic, English, French, and German.

== Issues ==
In July 2006, Khiyami announced to the London media that Syria was attempting to dissuade Hezbollah from continuing to launch rocket attacks on Israel, the latter being part of the claimed justification for Israel's July air strikes on Lebanon.

Khiyami has also argued that the international community, when gauging its response to the Middle East conflict, should examine the totality of the conflict's victims.

Khiyami was seen as collaborating closely with Ghayth Armanazi of the Syrian Media Centre, London, and the British Syrian Society.

On April 28, 2011, Khiyami's invitation to Prince William's wedding was formally withdrawn due to Syria's violent response to protesters.

Khiyami left his position as ambassador to the United Kingdom in March 2012. He quit the diplomatic service shortly thereafter, citing the excessive use of violence of the Syrian governments against protesters as the reason for his resignation.

According to German and Arabic media reports Khiyami is among the founding members of an initiative called the 'Council of the Syrian Charter' that unites elders and representatives from various Syrian families, clans, tribes and communities both inside and outside of Syria. Khiyami is said to have played an important role in the drafting of a document known as the 'Code of Conduct for Syrian Coexistence' that was solemnly signed by community representatives, including Syrian Alawites, in 2017.

== See also ==
- Foreign relations of Syria
