= Iman Shahoud =

Syrian judge and activist

- إيمان شحود
- Born: 1963 (age 62–63); Aleppo, Syria
- Education: University of Aleppo
- Occupations: Judge, legal expert, activist
- Known for: Member of the Syrian Constitutional Committee

Iman (Eman) Shahoud, (born 1963 in Aleppo, Arabic: إيمان شحود) is a Syrian judge and legal expert. She is a human and women's rights activist and a current member of the Syrian Constitutional Committee.

== Early life and career ==
Shahoud enrolled at the Law Faculty of the University of Aleppo in 1981, a time when the city was one of the central arenas of violent incidents known as the Islamist uprising in Syria (1979–1982). In 1986 Shahoud became a member of Syrian Bar Association as a paralegal and started practicing law as an attorney in 1988. Her cases encompassed criminal, civil, military and personal status law. In 2003 she was appointed Counselor at the Civil Division of the Aleppo Court of Appeal. Later on Shahoud was transferred to the Court of Appeal in Idlib where she worked as a judge. At that time, according to a 2007 report by the Global Justice Center less than 13% of Syrian magistrates where women.

== Political and constitutional activities ==
With the escalation of violence in Syria in 2011 that led to the Syrian civil war and a subsequent loss of territorial control of the Syrian government over parts of the Northern Aleppo and Idlib Governorates, several judges and lawyers created an opposition organization called the Free Independent Syrian Judiciary Council to establish a judicial system of self-administration in these areas. Shahoud became a member of the organization's Supreme Judicial Committee.

In 2013 she joined the 'Syrian Expert House', an initiative of Syrians from various backgrounds who presented a roadmap for political transition and the reform of state institutions in Syria.

In 2014 she emigrated to Sweden.

In 2015 Shahoud co-authored a letter to then-UN Syria Envoy Staffan di Mistura urging him not to propose or accept that "immunity may be offered to suspects of war crimes" as part of a deal to solve the Syrian crisis. The group of legal experts calling itself the Transitional Justice Coordination Group stated that a successful transition could only happen with full "accountability and the rule of law".

In Sweden Shahoud continued to advocate for women's rights and was solicited in a number of divorce cases among Syrians in exile. According to Shahoud "a variety of factors have contributed to the increase of divorce cases among refugees in Sweden, including the freedom that allowed some women to get out of forced marriages for example".

In October 2019, Nasr al-Hariri, the chairman of the High Negotiations Committee, an umbrella body for various armed and un-armed Syrian opposition groups, announced that Shahoud would be a member of the HNC's delegation for the Syrian Constitutional Committee. The committee is a UN-facilitated initiative to enable dialogue between opposition groups and the Syrian government by amending the 2012 Constitution of Syria. The UN list Shahoud among the members of the committee's 'Small Body' responsible for drafting the amendments. Shahoud is a member of the Council of the Syrian Charter, a network of influential Syrian society leaders who engaged in dialogue and mediation with Syrians from across the political divide.
