= ZyLAB Technologies =

Dutch-American software developer

ZyLAB
- Company type: Private
- Industry: Software
- Founded: 1983
- Headquarters: McLean, Virginia; Amsterdam
- Key people: Dennis van der Veeke (President and CEO); Johannes C. Scholtes (Chairman and Chief Strategy Officer)
- Number of employees: 140
- Website: www.zylab.com

ZyLAB is a developer of software for e-discovery, information risk management, email management, records, contract, and document management, knowledge management, and workflow. The company is headquartered in McLean, Virginia, and in Amsterdam, Netherlands.

== History ==
In 1983 ZyLAB began providing a full-text search program for electronic files stored in IBM-compatible PCs called ZyINDEX. In 1991, ZyLAB integrated ZyINDEX with an optical character recognition program called ZyIMAGE. In 1998, the company developed support to full-text search email, including attachments.

In 2000, the company adopted the XML standard and created a full content management and records management system based on it.

In 2010, ZyLAB Information Management Platform was released, an integrated solution to address e-Discovery and information management problems.

In 2023, ZyLAB was purchased by Reveal Data.
