= Asiem El Difraoui =

German-Egyptian political scientist and economist

- Born: Abdelasiem Hassan El Difraoui; 5 April 1965 (age 61); Offenbach am Main
- Occupation: Political scientist

Asiem El Difraoui (Arabic: عبد العظيم حسن الدفراوي, DMG 'Abd al-'Aẓīm Ḥasan ad Difrāwī; born 5 April 1965) is a political scientist, economist, and documentary director and producer of Egyptian-German descent. He focuses primarily on topics related to the Arab world, and is widely considered as a leading expert on Arab media in general and jihadism internet propaganda in particular.

== Biography ==
Asiem El Difraoui studied at the American University in Cairo (AUC) and the School of Oriental and African Studies (SOAS) in London, where he earned a B.A. honours degree in political science and economics. In 1992 he acquired a DEA (French: Diplôme d'Etudes Approfondies), an advanced post-graduate research degree comparable to the M.Phil., in political science from Sciences Po Paris (IEP). This is also where he completed his PhD in 2010, under the supervision of French scholar Gilles Kepel. His thesis was entitled: "The Jihad of images – a political analysis of Al Qaeda's audio-visual propaganda".

Between 1992 and 2008, he produced with his own production company, "Impossible Productions", a variety of political documentaries and reports on as diverse socio- and geo-political issues as the Second Gulf War in Iraq and the far-right 'National Front' movement in France. As a journalist and director and producer of documentaries, Asiem El Difraoui has thus worked in Germany, France, the MENA region, the Balkans, and South East Asia.

Between 2004 and 2010, El Difraoui moreover taught journalism at Sciences Po in Paris. From 2010 to 2013, he joined the 'Near/Middle East' research group at the German Institute for International and Security Affairs in Berlin (SWP) as a research fellow. During this time he was involved with the project "Jihadism on the Internet: The internationalization of violence discourses on the World Wide Web" and served in this capacity as an advisor on the European Commission's 'Clean IT' initiative. Since 2012, he is also a senior fellow at the Berlin Institute for Media and Communication Policy (IfM).

El Difraoui is also one of the founders of the Candid Foundation in Berlin, an independent think tank which attempts to promote intercultural understanding and creative approaches in international development, focussing especially on the Middle East, Africa, Asia and the Mediterranean. Since 2015, he is also an editorial advisory board member of Zenith Magazine, an independent German magazine, focusing on the Arab and the Islamic world. Today, his expertise on the Arab world encompasses particularly dynamics in Algeria, Egypt, Iraq, and Saudi Arabia.

He is a member of the board of the Paris-based think tank EuropaNova. In 2019, El Difraoui was head of a project for the German Federal Office for Migration and Refugees (BAMF) to develop a qualification course and a non-fiction book on exiting Islamic extremism. El Difraoui has advised French and German ministries and EU institutions on extremism prevention for many years. His book "Die Hydra des Dschihadismus" (The Hydra of Jihadism) will be published by Suhrkamp Verlag in November this year.

== Filmography (partial) ==
- Toulon, Vitrine des Front National. [Toulon, show case of the 'National Front'] Arte, 1998, author.
- Frieden im Baskenland? [Peace in the Basque Country?] Arte report, 1998, author.
- Die Belagerung Bagdads [Bagdad under siege]. Spiegel-TV, 2003, author (with Peter Hell and Steffen Haug).
- Osama bin Laden: Der Prophet des Terrors. [Osama bin Laden: Prophet of Terror] Spiegel-TV, 2004, author (with Britta Sandberg).
- Mekka retten: Ein Mann kämpft gegen die Zerstörung seiner Heimat [Saving Mecca: A Man fights his country’s destruction]. WDR, 2005, author.
- Die Sprache von Al-Qaida. [Al-Qaida's language]. Arte/WDR, 2008, author and co-producer (with Mark Johnston).
- Tahrir 2011: The Good, the Bad and the Politician. WDR/Canal Plus, 2011, co-producer.

== Bibliography (partial) ==
- Le djihadisme [Djihadism]. Paris: PUF, Que-sais-je?, 2016, 128p.
- Arabische Medien [Arabic media]. Konstanz: UVK, 2015, 344 p. (with Carola Richter)
- Ein Neues Ägypten? Eine Reise durch ein Land im Aufruhr [A new Egypt? Journey through a country in uproar]. Hamburg: Edition Körber Stiftung, 2013, ISBN 978-3-89684-152-0
- Al-Qaida par l’image: La prophétie du martyre [The Jihad of images – a political analysis of Al Qaeda's audio-visual propaganda]. Dissertation, PUF, Paris 2013.
- Jihad.de, Jihadistische Online-Propaganda: Empfehlungen für Gegenmaßnahmen in Deutschland [Jihad.de, jihadist propaganda online: Recommendations for counter-measures in Germany], SWP-Studien 2012/S, 5 February 2012 (accessible online, PDF)
- Es gibt keine "Facebook-Revolution" – aber eine ägyptische Jugend, die wir kaum kennen [There is no "facebook-revolution" – but an Egyptian youth we almost don't know], in: Muriel Asseburg (Hg.), Proteste, Aufstände und Regimewandel in der arabischen Welt. Akteure, Herausforderungen, Implikationen und Handlungsoptionen, SWP-Studien 2011/S, 27 October 2011, S. 17–19.
- With Oliver Hahn: Der arabische Schwarm im Netz des Medienwandels. Ein Salonstreitgespräch zur Protestkommunikation ziviler Bewegungen in mehr als 140 Zeichen [The arab shoal in the net of media shifts. A symposium on the protest communication of civil movements in more than 140 characters], in: Erik Bettermann and Ronald Grätz (Hg.), Digitale Herausforderung. Außenpolitik und internationale Kommunikation in Zeiten von Web 2.0, Steidl, Berlin 2012.
- With Leoni Abel: The Web 2.0 Revolution and Arab Revolutionaries. The role of the new media as political infrastructure in the Arab World, in: Deutsche Welle Media Dialogue 2012. The Arab World: The role of Media in the Arab World's Transformation Process, Vistas, Berlin 2012.
- The Arab Spring: a golden opportunity for Global Jihad?. in: Barbara Lippert/ Volker Perthes (eds.), Expect the unexpected. Ten situations to keep an eye on, SWP Research Paper 2012/RP 1, November 2011.
- With Stefan Aust: Irak: Geschichte eines modernen Krieges, dtv, München 2004.La critique du systeme democratique par le Front islamique du salut [The critique of the democratic system by the Islamic Salvation Front], in: Gilles Kepel (ed.), Exils et royaumes: Les appartenances au monde arabo-musulman aujourd'hui: études réunies pour Rémy Leveau, Presse de Sciences Po, Paris 1994, pp. 105 ff.
- The role of culture in preventing and reducing violent extremism in: moreeurope.org, 2017 ( PDF)
- with Milena Uhlmann, Prévention de la radicalisation et déradicalisation : les modèles allemand, britannique et danois, in: Institut français des relations internationales (IFRI) (ed.), Politique étrangère 2015/4 (Hiver), Justice pénale internationale : un bilan, Paris 2015, ISBN 978-2-36567-453-9
- Die Hydra des Dschihadismus - Entstehung, Ausbreitung und Abwehr einer globalen Gefahr, Berlin, Suhrkamp Verlag, 2021, ISBN 978-3-518-42564-0

== Awards and honours ==
- 1998 : Prix Franco-allemand du journalisme [Franco-German journalism award] in the category "Television" for "Toulon, Vitrine du Front National" [Toulon, show case of the National Front].
- 2004 : Bronze medal at the New York Film and Television Festival for "Die Belagerung Bagdads" [Bagdad under siege].
- 2006 : Silver medal at the Al Jazeera Documentary Film Festival in the category "investigative reports" for "Mekka retten" [Saving Mecca].
- 2010 : Certificate for creative excellence from the U.S. International Film & Video Festival for "La langue d'Al-Qaida" [Al-Qaida's language].
- Certificat pour l'excellence créative du U.S. International Film & Video Festival pour "La langue d'Al-Qaida".
- 2012 : The UNESCO's Enrico Fulchignoni award (awarded at the Mostra de Venise) for "Tahrir 2011".
