= Belabbes Benkredda =

Algerian-German social innovator

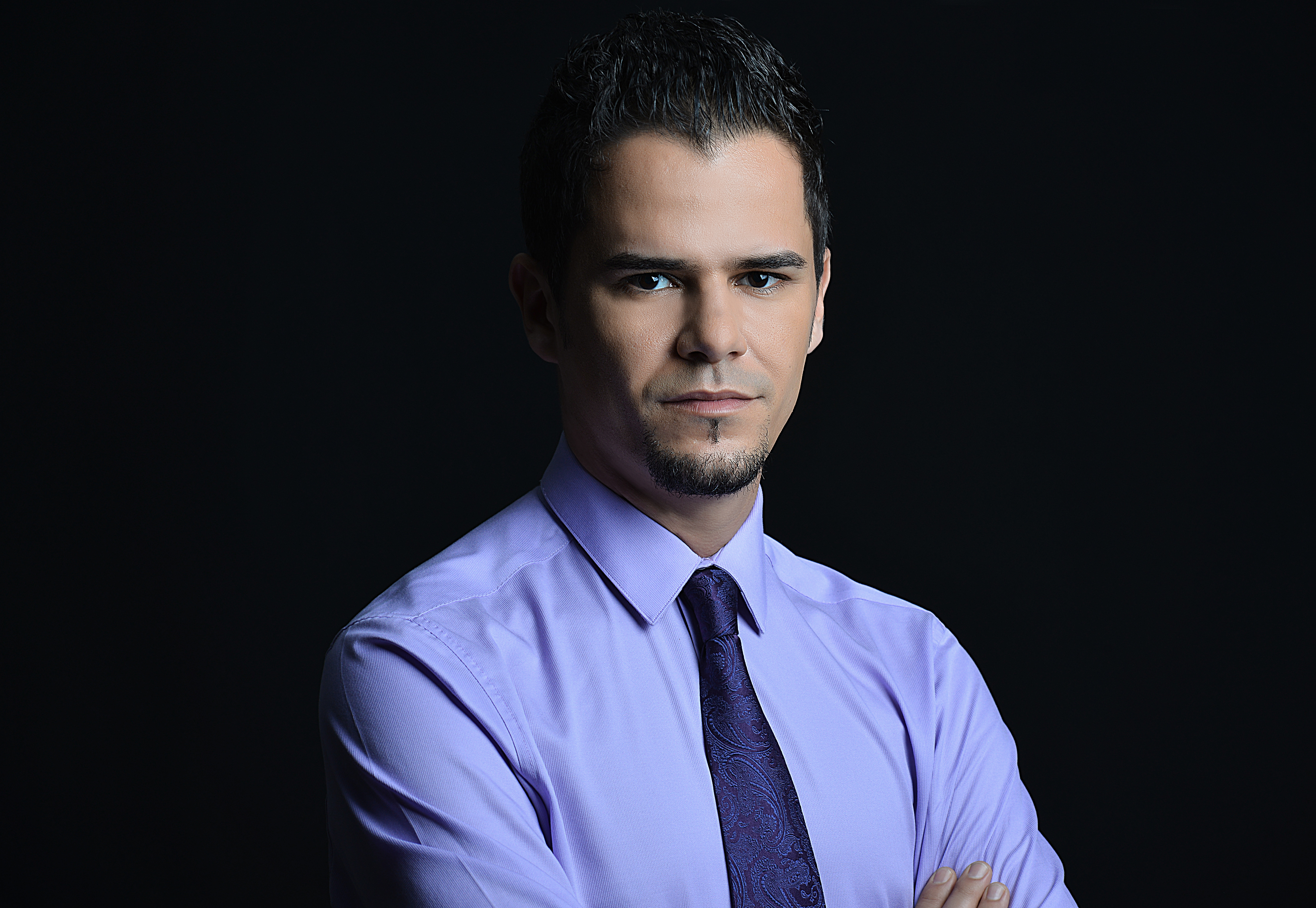
- Born: Frankfurt, Germany
- Education: Goethe University, University of Exeter, Yale University
- Occupation: Founder of the Munathara Initiative
- Website: http://www.munathara.com/

Belabbes Benkredda is an Algerian-German social innovator, writer, television commentator, and government consultant who specializes in public diplomacy. He is the founder of the Munathara Initiative, an Arab online and television debate forum that promotes the voices of youth, women and marginalized communities in the Arab public. He was a recipient of the 2013 Democracy Award of the National Democratic Institute, and is a fellow of the Salzburg Global Seminar. In 2016 he was named a World Fellow by Yale University.

== Education and career ==
Benkredda received an undergraduate degree in Frankfurt, at Goethe University. He studied international relations and philosophy of law, graduating with an MA in Middle East Politics from the University of Exeter.

He worked for the German Foreign Office in Berlin, the Council for Arab-British Understanding in London, and for Zenith Magazine in various cities in the Middle East. He has also worked for the League of Arab States and the Peace Research Institute Frankfurt.

His articles on media and democracy in the Arab world have appeared in Gulf News, Khaleej Times, The National and the European Magazine. He has contributed commentary on Arab affairs to a number of international media, including Aljazeera TV, Spiegel Online, and the New York Times.

Benkredda is one of the founders of the Berlin-based think tank Candid Foundation.

In 2019, he co-initiated Tunisia's first-ever televised candidate debate in the run-up to the 2019 Tunisian presidential election.

=== Dubai Debates ===
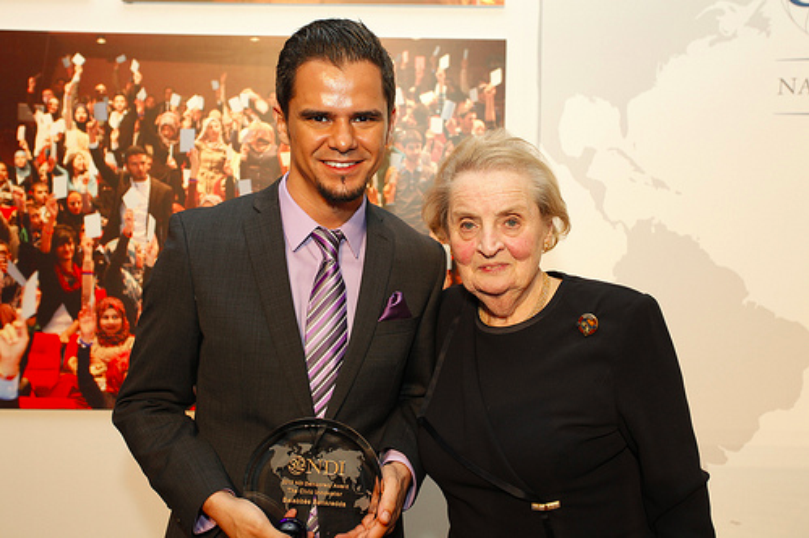
Belabbes Benkredda and Secretary Madeleine Albright during the 2013 NDI Democracy Awards in Washington, DC

In January 2011, Benkredda founded the Dubai Debates, intending for it to be an independent platform for discussing important issues facing the Arab world. The project was supported by groups such as KAS (Konrad-Adenauer-Stiftung), Vital Voices, and CNN International. In the spring of 2012, he suspended the project and created a sister organization in Tunis, Tunisia.

=== Munathara Initiative ===
The Dubai Debates ceased its operations and Benkredda founded the Munathara Initiative in 2012. This successor program is set up in a similar way and takes a three-pronged approach to debates: community outreach, online and social media participation, and a live debate event. Live television debates have been held in Tunis, Sanaa, Amman and Istanbul.

== Awards and recognition ==
- 2013 Democracy Award of the National Democratic Institute
- Alumnus of the Sessions of the Salzburg Global Seminar, referred to as a Salzburg Global Fellow
- Nazih Ayubi Memorial Award in 2004
