= Abdel Bari Atwan =

Palestinian-born British journalist (born 1950)

- عبد الباري عطوان
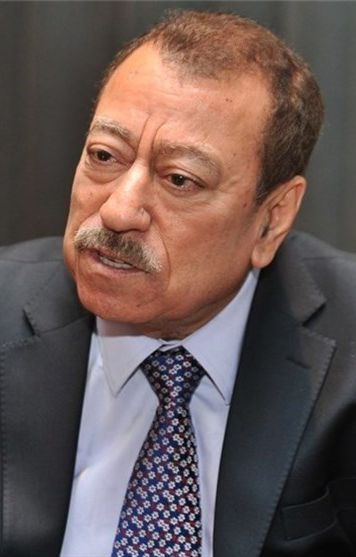
- Abdel Bari Atwan in 2017
- Born: 17 February 1950 (age 76); Deir al-Balah, Gaza Strip
- Other names: Abd al-Bari Atwan, Abdul Bari Atwan
- Citizenship: British
- Occupation: Journalist
- Known for: Newspaper editor-in-chief
- Website: bariatwan.com (in Arabic)

Abdel Bari Atwan (Arabic: عبد الباري عطوان ʿAbd al-Bārī ʿAṭwān, Levantine pronunciation: [ˈʕabd elˈbaːɾi ʕɑtˤˈwaːn]; born 17 February 1950) is a Palestinian-born British journalist and the editor-in-chief of Rai al-Youm, an Arab world digital news and opinion website. Previously he was the editor-in-chief of the London-based pan-Arab newspaper Al-Quds Al-Arabi from the founding of the paper in 1989 until July 2013.

== Early life and career background ==
Abdel Bari Atwan was born on 17 February 1950 in Deir al-Balah Camp, a Palestinian refugee camp in the Gaza Strip. His parents Zilfa and Muhammad Atwan lived in Isdud. He was one of their 11 children. After receiving his primary school education at the camp, his schooling was continued first in Jordan in 1967, and then in Cairo, Egypt.

In 1970, he entered Cairo University where he studied journalism and received a diploma in English-Arabic translation. After his graduation, he began a career in journalism, initially with the Al Balaagh newspaper in Libya, then with Al Madina in Saudi Arabia. In 1978, he moved to London, where he has lived since then, and assumed a job with Asharq Al-Awsat, a Saudi-owned international daily. In 1980, he set up the London office of Al Madina and in 1984 returned to Asharq Al-Awsat.

In 1989, Al-Quds Al-Arabi was founded by expatriate Palestinians and Atwan was offered the job as editor-in-chief, which he held until 2013. The paper is known for its Arab nationalism and advocacy of the Palestinian cause. It has been banned and censored repeatedly in several Arab countries for vocal criticism of what the paper alleges is their autocratic rule and excessive deference to Israel and the United States. As editor of Al-Quds Al-Arabi, Atwan became a public figure; he is a guest on Dateline London on BBC World, Sky News, Al Jazeera English and CNN World, as well as on Arabic-language networks. He has contributed articles to British newspapers including The Guardian, The Mail on Sunday, and The Herald (Glasgow). He is a columnist for Gulf News.

He has written four books. Islamic State: The Digital Caliphate was published by Saqi Books and the University of California Press in 2015. Atwan has also contributed chapters and essays to academic and specialist books and journals. He gives talks and lectures internationally, including at the Edinburgh Festival and Harvard University.

=== Bin Laden interview ===
In 1996, Atwan interviewed Osama bin Laden. He had to travel through the mountains, dressed in Afghan clothing. He later called the experience his "most frightening trip". His impression of bin Laden was that he is "a phenomenon, extreme". Atwan stayed in the caves for two days, sleeping in primitive conditions in sub-zero temperatures. In his book, The Secret History of al-Qa'ida Atwan states, "I do not endorse or in any way support al-Qa'ida's agenda" and "I utterly condemn the attacks on innocent citizens in the West."

=== Brisbane visa affair ===
In a scheduled visit to the Brisbane Writers Festival in September 2007, Atwan's visa was reported as being blocked by the Australian Security Intelligence Organisation (ASIO). Subsequently, this turned out to be over-enthusiastic reporting. According to ASIO, Atwan's application had been delayed by the Australian Intelligence for less than four weeks, ASIO said "It is false to suggest it's anything to do with the media campaign or conspiracy theories, We had to seek some additional information. Dr Atwan's application was treated like everybody else's."

=== U.S. visa issues ===
In 2016, Atwan's visa application to the United States experienced "prolonged and unusual delay". He had been scheduled to make various speaking appearances, including at New York University, but was forced to cancel the speaking tour due to the effective denial of his entry to the country.

== Political opinions ==
=== September 11 attacks ===
On the fifth anniversary of the September 11 attacks Atwan said: "The events of 11 September will be remembered as the end of the US empire. This is because all empires collapse when they pursue the arrogance of power."

=== Al-Qaeda ===
Atwan has repeatedly expressed his view that the war on terror is the root cause for the creation of numerous regional Al-Qaeda offshoots. At the second Dubai Debates on 31 May 2011, he stated: "We used to have one address for Al Qaeda. ... Tora Bora, Tora Bora main square, Tora Bora highroad, the third cave on the left. ... Now we have Al Qaeda in Afghanistan, Pakistan, Yemen, Iraq, Somalia and in the Islamic Maghreb."

=== 2003 invasion of Iraq ===
He expressed sympathy with the insurgency against the US-led 2003 invasion of Iraq. Commenting on former president Saddam Hussein's execution he said that he would "go to the gallows with his head held high, because he built a strong united Iraq without sectarianism". Later on, Atwan claimed that Saddam Hussein mentioned that "a nation which has Abdul Bari Atwan will not be defeated", before his execution.

=== Israel ===
Speaking about the potential for a retaliatory attack by Iran in the event it was attacked by Israel, in an interview on Lebanese television in June 2007, Atwan stated, "If the Iranian missiles strike Israel, by Allah, I will go to Trafalgar Square and dance with delight." He further stated in the case of war, Iran would retaliate against its Arab neighbors, American bases in the Gulf and "Allah willing, it will attack Israel, as well."

In March 2008, Atwan said that the Mercaz HaRav shooting, in which a Palestinian gunman killed eight students (aged 15 to 26), "was justified". He added that the Mercaz HaRav yeshiva is responsible for "hatching Israeli extremists and fundamentalists" and that the celebrations in Gaza following the attack symbolized "the courage of the Palestinian nation".

A vocal critic of what he describes as Israel's "racist" and "apartheid" treatment of Palestinians, Atwan has advocated a peaceful, non-violent settlement to the Palestinian-Israeli conflict. In his memoir, A Country of Words, Atwan says, "We have to learn to live together in peace and co-operation in a multi-cultural society in one democratic secular state for two people. One state for both peoples governed by a representative democracy and on an equal footing. We manage it here in London, it is working in South Africa, and there is enough room for everyone in Palestine. I respect the Jewish people and their religion. I do not want to destroy Israel but I do want to end racism and the current Apartheid system."

According to his personal website, Atwan has been banned by Israeli authorities from visiting the Palestinian territories since 2000. As a result, he was neither able to visit his ill mother nor attend her funeral after she died in 2003.

Atwan described the attacks on Israelis in Eilat as correcting "This attack put the spotlight back on the most important struggle – that for the honor of the Arab and Islamic nation... Resistance is a legitimate right as long as land is occupied and the people and holy places are humiliated...the course of the Arab revolutions and refocused them on the most dangerous disease, namely Israeli tyranny. This disease is the cause of all the defects that have afflicted the region for the past 65 years."

In an interview which aired on the Lebanese Al Mayadeen TV channel on 31 January 2015 (as translated by the Middle East Media Research Institute, MEMRI), Atwan stated that "Jihad must be directed, first and foremost, against the Israeli enemy...All our guns must be turned toward that enemy, regardless of our differences, because this is the only thing that unites us." Atwan also declared that "Arabs who do not think that Israel is an enemy are neither Arabs nor Muslims."

In another Al Mayadeen interview translated by MEMRI, broadcast in August 2021, Atwan contended that the American evacuation of Afghanistan presaged what will soon happen to Israel, suggesting that Israelis should start "learning how to swim" because their "only option" will be to flee from Israel into the Mediterranean Sea "like rats fleeing a sinking ship".

=== 2011 Libyan civil war ===
On 17 April 2011, speaking on BBC News Channel's Dateline London, Atwan claimed that post-revolutionary Libya would become "a hotbed of extremists'.

On 4 September 2011, Mustafa Abdul Jalil, chair of the NTC, the interim free Libyan government, in an attempt to damage Atwan's reputation as a commentator, alleged that documentary proof had emerged that Atwan was on the payroll of Gaddafi. Atwan reiterated that there is no truth in this baseless allegation and is currently suing Mustafa Abdul Jalil for defamation in the UK courts.

=== Iran's military satellite (Noor) ===
On 7 May 2020, Atwan mentioned in regards to Iran's recent launched military satellite to space, that: it will change the region's equations. This Arab analyzer added: Noor (satellite) will observe each American ant, and each Israeli mosquito on the Earth; and with this achievement, Iran can monitor all American and Israeli troops on the ground.

=== Holocaust denial ===
On 5 June 2024, he uploaded an Arabic language video to his Youtube channel where he denied the Holocaust. He claimed that "The Holocaust is a lie and a fabrication, and it was followed by [the narrative of] the 'Promised Land', so that they would go to Palestine. This was invented by Zionism. Now, this story is over, and this lie has been exposed." Subsequently, Apple News were criticized for having granted him a continuous platform. According to The Jerusalem Post, dozens of Atwan’s articles could be found on the Apple News app, many of which featured instances of commending terrorist attacks and leaders of terror designated organizations.

== Criticism ==
Following an October 2003 article in which Atwan claimed that the U.S. is to blame for the Arab world's hatred of it, a Yemenite journalist and columnist for the London Arabic-language daily Al-Sharq Al-Awsat, Munir Al-Mawari, stated: "The Abd Al Bari Atwan on CNN is completely different from the Abdel Bari Atwan on the Al Jazeera network or in his Al-Quds Al-Arabi daily. On CNN, Atwan speaks solemnly and with total composure, presenting rational and balanced views. This is in complete contrast with his fuming appearances on Al Jazeera and in Al-Quds Al-Arabi, in which he whips up the emotions of multitudes of viewers and readers."

In response to Atwan's legitimization of the Mercaz HaRav shooting in March 2008, Lior Ben-Dor, a spokesman at the Israeli embassy in London, said: "The problem is that when addressing the British public, he tends to hide his true opinions and ideology – his support for terror and the murder of civilians. This article reveals Atwan's real colors, a supporter of fundamentalism and terror, and hence he should be treated accordingly."

== Resignation ==
On 9 July 2013, Atwan stated in his final editorial at Al-Quds Al-Arabi that he was resigning from his two posts as editor-in-chief and as chairman of the board. Entitled "Dear Readers...Goodbye until we meet soon, God Willing", his editorial explained that external pressures had influenced his decision. He chronicled his own journey and the reasons behind the unprecedented success of Al-Quds Al-Arabi. He stated that over a period of a quarter of a century, he had received death threats from the "Arab, Foreign, and Israeli security services". He insisted that he had never compromised on his ideals and took pride in his profession, "leaving with his head held high".

== Books ==
- The Secret History of Al-Qa'ida, Abdel Bari Atwan, Little Brown (2006), ISBN 978-0-349-12035-5
- A Country of Words: The Life of Abdel Bari Atwan: A Palestinian Journey from the Refugee Camp to the Front Page, Abdel Bari Atwan, SAQI (25 September 2008), ISBN 978-0-86356-621-9
- After Bin Laden: Al-Qa'ida, The Next Generation, Abdel Bari Atwan, SAQI (10 September 2012), ISBN 978-0-86356-419-2
- Islamic State: The Digital Caliphate, Abdel Bari Atwan, University of California Press (8 September 2015), ISBN 978-0-52028-928-4
