= Mohammad Habash =

Syrian Islamic scholar

- محمد حبش
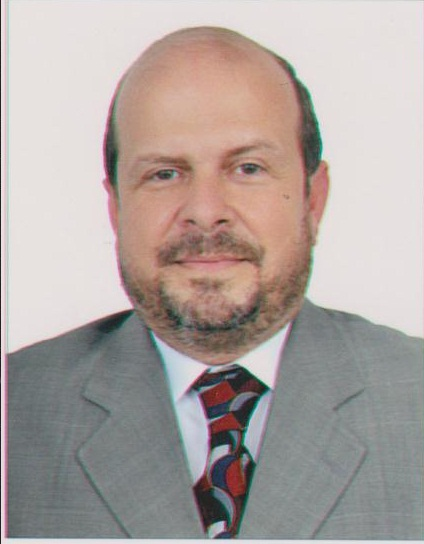
- Mohammad Al-Habash
- Born: October 1, 1962 (age 64); Damascus, Syria

Mohammad Al-Habash or Mohamed Habash (Arabic: محمد حبش; born 1 October 1962) is a Syrian Islamic scholar, and writer. He is part of the Islamic revivalist movement in Syria, and the founder of the Studies Center for Civilization and Enlightenment Research.

== Biography ==
Mohammad Habash grew up in his Sheikh Ahmed Kuftaro School of Islamic Sciences in Damascus, memorized the Qur’an under supervision of Sheikh Muhammad Sukkar, and studied Islamic science at the Islamic Institute for Da'awah, and then obtained a degree of recitation with frequent readings from “The Sheikh of the Readers” Muhammad Sukkar and from Syrian fatwa.

He obtained a license in "Sharia" from the University of Damascus and then continued his achievement, obtaining three degrees in BA in Arab and Islamic sciences from the universities of Damascus, Tripoli and Beirut. He also obtained a master’s degree and a Doctorate from the University of the Holy Qur’an in Khartoum under the supervision of Wahbah al-Zuhayli and Muhammad Ali al-Imam in 1996 When he began teaching at the university of Damascus, the Islamic Dawah college and religion basics in Damascus.

In 2010 University of Craiova, the most ancient and important Romanian universities, has announced that the PhD of honor was given to Muhammad Habash in appreciation of his research and his activity in the dialogue of religions, especially his book The Biography of the Messenger Muhammad, and the university has translated this book into Romanian and considered it as a textbook for students of faculties of theology at the university.

He was a preacher and Imam for 30 years in Al-Zahraa mosque in Damascus, a founder and a director for Quranic schools in Syria, and an adviser of the Islamic research center. He was, twice, elected president of the association of sharia scholars in Damascus. Moreover his activities in writing and poetry.

Since 2012, he moved to the UAE where he worked as an associate professor at the University of Abu Dhabi, at the College of Arts and Sciences, then at the College of Law, where he teaches Islamic courses at the university.

Present as a visiting professor at a number of international universities, the most important of which are: University of Helsinki, Finland 1998 - Lund University in Sweden 2003 - University of Craiova - Romania 2009 - University of Oslo - Norway 2012 - University of Rostock - Germany 2016 and other universities.

Mohammad Habash is a member of the Council of the Syrian Charter, a non-partisan network of society leaders in Syria and the Syrian diaspora.

== The intellectual project ==
Mohammad Habash adopted the religious renewal, particularly affected by Sheikh Ahmed Kaftaro and Sheikh Jawdat Saeed, and launched his project through the Islamic Studies Center in Damascus, which he founded and supervised, and held several Islamic conferences to promote the discourse of Islamic enlightenment.

He founded the Enlightenment Book Association and was twice elected president of the Association of Sharia Scholars in Syria.

He has published 52 printed books on the issues of Islamic enlightenment, and is well known for his bold articles in Arab newspapers, and for his many programs on satellite stations and Arab radio stations.

Habash adopts a number of issues of religious renewal, the most important of which are: rejecting the monopoly of salvation, renewing women's jurisprudence in Islam and reviving the sources of the absent Sharia, which means giving a greater role in the legislation to the mind at the expense of the text. His rise was rapid and came as a shock to the traditional discourse, and he was severely criticized by conservative figures, while he was widely accepted by the enlightenment and modernization trends in Islam, and this led to a series of intellectual confrontations, published in a number of newspapers, and he continued to practice public speaking, imamate and religious functions and published in many newspapers’ magazines.

He declared his position on the events in Syria, rejected the violent solution adopted by the regime, and also rejected the armament carried out by the revolutionaries, and called for peace to lay down arms and sit at the table of dialogue, and was among the most prominent advocates of peace during that stage. Habash summarizes his intellectual project in a special letter entitled the message of renewal, and summarizes it with lines and addresses:

- Brotherhood of religions and human dignity
- Islam without violence
- Religions without wars
- Dialogues in the brotherhood of religions in Damascus
- Human freedom is a sacred right and slavery in all its colors is disbelief and shame
- Every fact proven by science is the word of God, and it has the power of a written book
- The Qur’an is a lined book and the universe is a published Qur’an
- The Quran is a guiding light, not a restriction
- The Sunnah of the Prophet is a wonderful experience of struggle, inspiring and not binding
- The system of governance in Islam is: and their command is a consultation between them
- The system of life in Islam is: You know the things of your world
- The analogy with the holly book is light, but the judgment is for reality.
- We take the legacy of the parent fathers not ash
- A religion between religions, not a religion above religions
- Democracy is God's instinct
- Humanity is one family, and man is the brother of man
- Against the monopoly of salvation, the monopoly of heaven, the monopoly of religion and the monopoly of truth

== Written about him ==
several studies were written about al-Habash wrote, including "Religious Renewal in Syria", which was written by Paul Hak of Princeton University in the United States, and he talked about the revamping project adopted by Habash. The book was printed repeatedly in English and Arabic, and it was also published by Ali Taha, Sadiq al-Mastawi, Adel al-Hamedi, Ghassan Yousef Ala Al-Rashi, Hael al-Yousifi, Raymond Zaitouni, and others, a series of lengthy intellectual dialogues to summarize his idea, and Bassam Al-Zain wrote a dialogue book in the criticism of the book of women between Sharia and Life entitled "My Friend of Habash", as Badr al-Din Aroudi, Ihsan Al-Hussein, Wael Mirza and others wrote various articles in criticizing his thought or His support.

== His most important scientific work ==
He was elected in 2006 as Vice President of the International Islamic Forum for Moderation, and he is a member of the Board of Trustees of the Islamic University in Islamabad and the University of Al-Jazira and a member of the Arab Writers Union and a number of international and local Islamic organizations.

He was a professor at the College of Sharia, the Faculty of Fundamentals of Religion, the College of Islamic Call and Academy. The Supreme Military Forces in Syria and supervised a number of PhDs and promotions at the University of Jordan and the College of Islamic Call.

In 2017 He received the Renewal Books Association Award for his book "Diplomacy Instead of War".

Since 2012, he moved to the UAE where he worked as an associate professor at the University of Abu Dhabi, at the College of Arts and Sciences, then at the College of Law, where he teaches Islamic courses at the university.

He has been in a number of international universities as a visiting professor, the most important of them are: University of Helsinki in Finland 1998 - Lund University in Sweden 2003 - University of Craiova in Romania 2009 - University of Oslo in Norway 2012 - University of Rostock in Germany 2016, and others.

Also, he managed over 800 TV & Radio programs.

International awards

Event	Award	Year	Country
The third international competition for the Holy Quran	Special award in interpretation	1981	Saudi Arabia
The International Holy Quran Contest	second place	1982	India
Conference of the Noble Qur’an civilization	Prize: a pioneer in Quranic sciences	1998	Kuwait
The International Holy Quran Contest	first place	1982	libya
World Peace Organization	The rank of peace ambassador	2001	New York
President Pervez Musharraf- Pakistan	Median major rank	2004	Islamabad
Culture and Arts Festival-ٍSaudi Arabia	Janadriyah Shield	2010	Riyadh
Islamic Council of Latin America	Overseas Islamic Communication Award	1995	San Paulo
North American Student Union ISNA	Prophet's Biography Prize-Biography Conference	2002	Los Anglos
University of Craiova	Honorary Doctorate - Romanian translation of his book: The Biography of the Messenger of God	2010	Craiova
ECPM	Person of the Year for Pioneering Criminal Law Reform	2012	Morocco
international association of parliamentarians for peace (iapp)	The International parliamentarian pioneer	2014	Japan
رابطة كتاب التنوير - الأردن	شخصية العام 2016	2016	Jordan
Oslo university	Accreditation of Academic Research - in Criminal Law Reform	2014	Norway
Lond university	The interfaith pioneer	2003	Sweden
International Islamic University, Islamabad IIUI	The religious renewal pioneer	2011	Islam Abad
University of the Punjab	Honorary Member of the Academic Promotions Committee	2018	Lahor
UPF universal peace federation	The religious renewal pioneer	2016	Cyprus
