= Zenith (magazine) =

- Editor-in-chief: Daniel Gerlach
- Categories: Political magazine
- Frequency: Quarterly
- Publisher: Candid Foundation
- Total circulation: 5,000
- Founded: 1999
- Country: Germany
- Based in: Berlin
- Language: German, English, Arabic
- Website: www.zenith.me
- ISSN: 1439-9660

Zenith (stylized in lower case) is an independent German-language magazine which focuses on the Arab and Islamic world. The magazine is published quarterly and addresses politics, economics, culture, and society in the Middle East, North Africa and Central Asia as well as the Muslim world more generally.

== History ==
The magazine was founded by six students of Middle Eastern Studies at the University of Hamburg in summer 1999 and was initially a non-profit project. The founders wanted to introduce new perspectives about the MENA region to the German media landscape, which had long been the preserve of a handful of specialists, such as Peter Scholl-Latour and Gerhard Konzelmann, and to challenge long-held stereotypes about the region.

In the spring of 2000, the association "forum zenith e.V." was founded. The association was the official publisher of the magazine Zenith until 2008. In October 2012, the German language flagship magazine Zenith was relaunched with a new design and it now features an integrated business section. The Zenith editorial team carried research into the lives of Egyptians and Tunisians following the fall of dictatorial rule, which culminated in the publication of Diktatur bewältigen (Confronted Past) in 2013.

In July 2013, Zenith fell victim to an attack by hackers reportedly from Turkey having run a cover comprising a map of Kurdistan and devoting the issue to the topic of Kurdistan. As of spring 2015, Candid Foundation assumed editorial responsibility for Zenith magazine, in partnership with the publishing house Deutscher Levante Verlag. In 2017, Zenith launched a new website incorporating English, German and Arabic content.

In August 2019, Zenith celebrated its 20th anniversary. Editor-in-chief Daniel Gerlach commented on the occasion by stating that Zenith's capability to survive and grow in an age of intense competition and general decline of print media was based on its ability to successfully cultivate a niche in the market and curate an approach to reporting on the Middle East that was both distant and empirical as well as empathetic. In 2019, Zenith editors and contributors collaborated with the Federal Agency for Civic Education to produce the multimedia project, Atlas des Arabischen Frühlings (AdAF), which provides an educational guide through the revolutions of 2011 in the Arab world.

== zenith Photo Award ==
In 2011, Zenith ran its first photography award entitled "Muslims in Germany" in collaboration with Stiftung Mercator. The winning entries were exhibited in the Haus der Geschichte. The second edition of the zenith photography award was held in 2013. The photography award continued in 2017. again with the support of Stiftung Mercator, and an exhibition of the winners was held at the Museum in der Kulturbrauerei in Berlin. The winning entries also featured in Frankfurter Allgemeine Zeitung.

== Vision and structure ==
Zenith has been quoted in the Austrian daily newspaper Der Standard as being "a contact point for people who think about the Middle East outside the mainstream media." On the celebration of zenith's 20th anniversary, the Berlin State Secretary Sawsan Chebli spoke of the importance of a publication like zenith to provide the much needed depth in the conversation about the Middle East and the Islamic World.

Zenith is independent both financially and content-wise and is published by Deutsche Levante Verlag GmbH in Berlin. Its editorial board includes Moritz Behrendt, Asiem El Difraoui, Yasemin Ergin, Daniel Gerlach, Christian Meier, Veit Raßhofer and Jörg Schäffer.
