= Nasr al-Hariri =

Syrian politician (born 1977)

- نصر الحريري
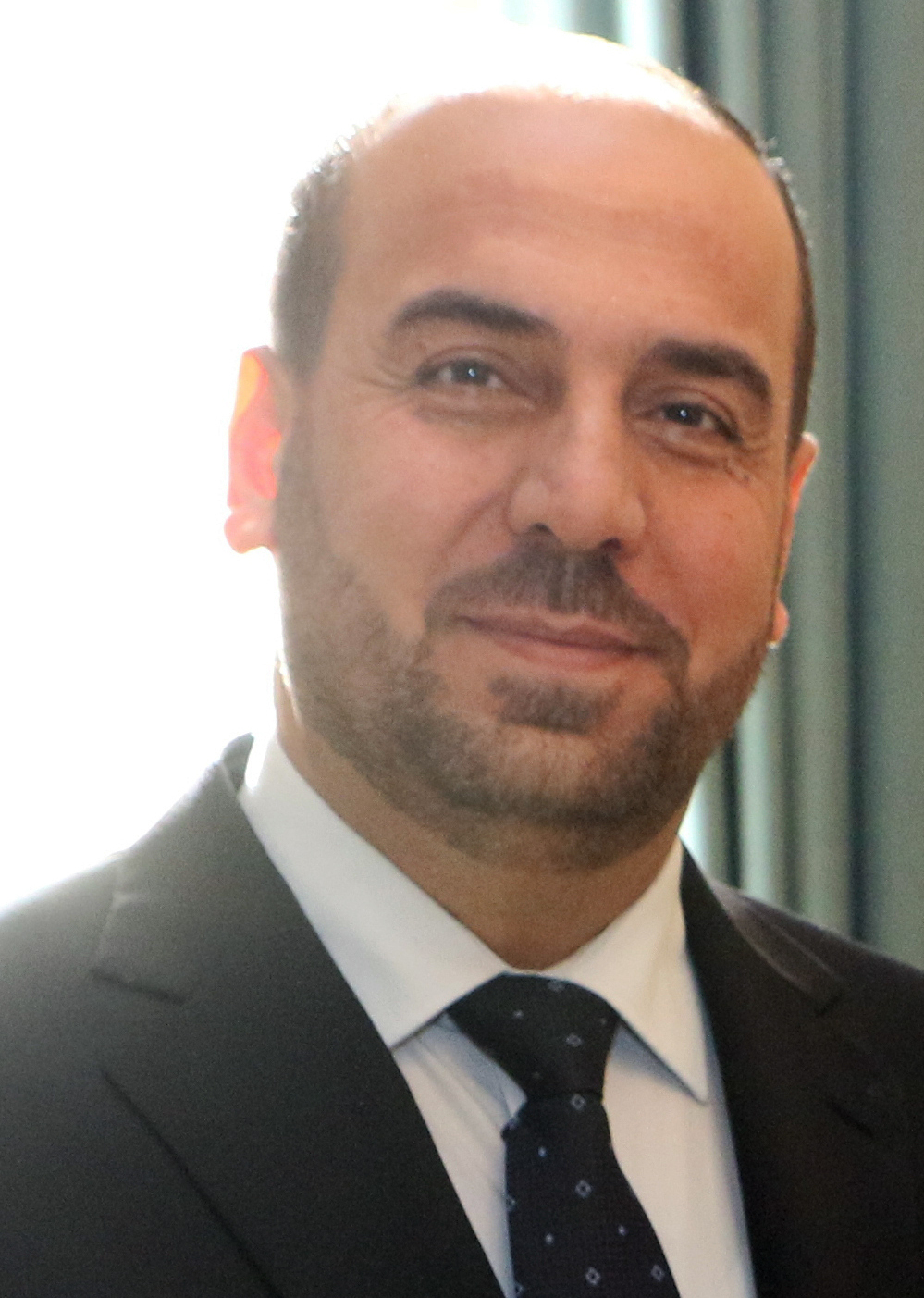
- al-Hariri in 2018

President of the Syrian National Coalition
- In office 12 July 2020 – 12 July 2021
- Prime Minister: Abdurrahman Mustafa
- Preceded by: Anas al-Abdah
- Succeeded by: Salem al-Meslet

President of the Syrian Negotiation Commission
- In office 20 November 2017 – 13 June 2020
- Preceded by: Riyad Farid Hijab (HNC)
- Succeeded by: Anas al-Abdah

Secretary-General of the Syrian National Coalition
- In office 4 January 2015 – 5 March 2016
- President: Khaled Khoja
- Preceded by: Anas al-Abdah
- Succeeded by: Abdulilah Fahd

Personal details
- Born: Nasr Musa al-Hariri; 23 August 1977 (age 48) Daraa, Syria
- Party: Independent Revolutionary Movement
- Other political affiliations: Syrian National Coalition (2013–2025)
- Education: Damascus University (MD)

Nasr Musa al-Hariri (Arabic: نصر موسى الحريري; born 23 August 1977) is a Syrian politician who served as president of the Syrian Negotiation Commission from 2018 to 2020 and as president of the Syrian National Coalition from 2020 to 2021.

== Political career ==
On 4 July 2013, Nasr al-Hariri joined the National Coalition for Syrian Revolutionary and Opposition Forces as a representative from the Hauran region of southern Syria. By 2015, he became the Secretary-General in the coalition based in Istanbul, Turkey.

In January 2017, he was one of the members of the Syrian opposition delegation that attended the peace talks in Astana. In February 2017 he was appointed as the head of opposition delegation for the Geneva IV conference on Syria, scheduled to be held on 20 February.

On 12 July 2020 he was elected as President of the National Coalition for Opposition and Revolutionary Forces of Syria, replacing Anas al-Abdah. He was succeeded by Salem al-Meslet on 15 July 2021.
