= Tokhar airstrike =

American airstrike during the Syrian civil war

- Part of the Manbij offensive (American-led intervention in Syria)
- Location of Manbij in Syria
- Location: Tokhar and Hoshriya, Manbij District, Aleppo Governorate, Syria
- Date: July 18, 2016 – July 19, 2016 (1 day)
- Attack type: airstrike
- Deaths: 56–212
- Victim: Civilians
- Perpetrators: United States Air Force; French Air Force (alleged)

The Tokhar airstrike occurred on 19 July 2016 in the village of Tokhar, during an offensive by United States-backed forces near the city of Manbij in Aleppo Governorate, and carried out by the United States Air Force. The operation was carried out as part of the American-led intervention in Syria. Reports of the death toll varied, ranging from 56 to 212 civilians being killed with "entire families" pulverized.

== Background ==
The American-led intervention in Syria has been ongoing since 22 September 2014, after the United States intervened in the Syrian Civil War against the Islamic State. From May 31 to August 27, 2016, the Syrian Democratic Forces, a coalition of anti-ISIL militias led by the YPG, successfully campaigned to capture the city of Manbij and its outskirts in Aleppo governorate. US air support played a key role in this offensive, with US airstrikes hitting Islamic State militants in and around the city.

AirWars director Chris Wood said of civilian casualties prior to the airstrike, "Since the siege began it’s our view that at least 190 civilians have been killed by coalition airstrikes, mostly US. We are concerned that the US-led alliance appears to have relaxed some of their rules concerning civilian casualties".

Since the beginning of the American-led intervention in Syria, independent monitoring group Airwars estimate 1,422 civilians have been killed in airstrikes carried out by the US Air Force, though the overall total could be as high as between 3,181 and 4,267 civilian non-combatant fatalities from 493 separate reported incidents.

== Attack ==
On Tuesday 19 July 2016, American warplanes attacked the Syrian village of Tokhar, which was housing civilians displaced by the fighting between the Islamic State and the Syrian Democratic Forces.

“This is likely the worst reported civilian toll of any coalition attack since the bombing campaign against ISIS began nearly two years ago,” said AirWars director Chris Wood.

== Investigation ==
On 27 July 2016, Colonel Chris Garver, spokesman for the coalition fighting Islamic State, said the United States military has found enough credible information to begin a formal investigation. Garver said a credibility assessment had been completed and the formal investigation had been initiated.

== Reactions ==
From subnational bodies

- United Nations: UNICEF's Syria representative, Hanaa Singer, condemned the bombings, calling "such horrific incidents confront parties to this conflict with their shared responsibility to respect international humanitarian laws that protect children in war".

From states

- United States: Colonel Chris Garver, spokesman for CJTF-OIR, the U.S. led coalition launching airstrikes in Syria, announced that the latter was investigating reports of civilian deaths.
- Iran: The spokesman for the Foreign Ministry of Iran Bahram Ghasemi condemned the airstrikes saying “Killing of innocent people particularly women and children, no matter what is the aim and under any pretext, is doomed and considered unacceptable and against the international law”.
- Russia: The Russian Ministry of Foreign Affairs sharply criticized U.S. airstrikes in Syria, accusing the United States of not taking steps to warn civilians ahead of strikes, as well as accusing them of killing hundreds of civilians and wounding thousands in airstrikes.

From other regional actors

- Syrian opposition: Anas Al-Abdah, the president of the National Coalition for Syrian Revolutionary and Opposition Forces, condemned the airstrikes and asked for a thorough investigation of the incident as well as changes in the coalition's operating rules.
- Rojava: The SDF-led Manbij Military Council denied coalition responsibility for the airstrike and instead blamed ISIL forces for the deaths. The SDF also condemned the SNC's proposal for the coalition to cease airstrikes in the area saying it would cause an increase in SDF casualties and slow the fight against ISIL.
- Ahrar al-Sham: In an online statement, Ahrar al-Sham condemned coalition airstrikes in Manbij and called for the Coalition to take full responsibility for the bombings which enabled SDF gains, whom Ahrar al-Sham labels as PKK terrorists.

== Aftermath ==
On 28 July 2016, US airstrikes killed at least 28 civilians, mostly women and including seven children, in the nearby village of Ghandoura.

== See also ==
- Al-Khan massacre
