= Jawad Abu Hatab =

Syrian politician (born 1962)

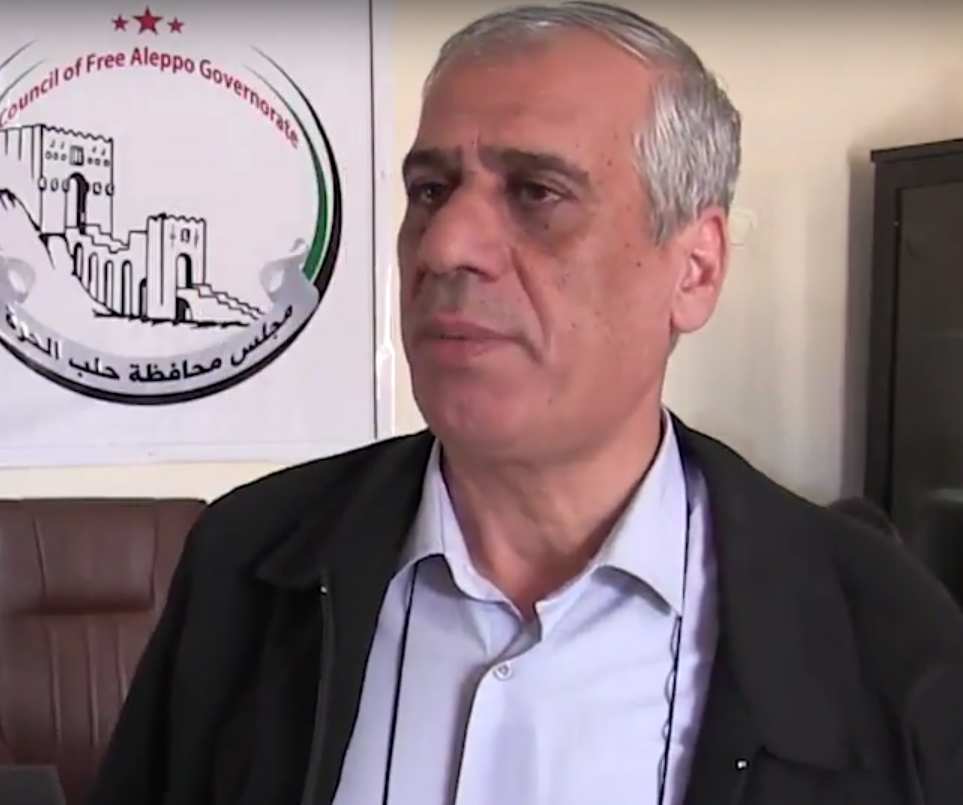
- Jawad in 2018

Prime Minister of the Syrian Interim Government
- In office 17 May 2016 – 10 March 2019
- President: Anas al-Abdah; Riad Seif; Abdurrahman Mustafa
- Preceded by: Ahmad Tu'mah
- Succeeded by: Abdurrahman Mustafa

Defense Minister of the Syrian Interim Government
- In office 17 May 2016 – 10 March 2019
- President: Anas al-Abdah; Riad Seif; Abdurrahman Mustafa
- Preceded by: office established
- Succeeded by: Salim Idris

Personal details
- Born: 26 January 1962 (age 64) Damascus, Syria
- Party: Independent
- Education: Damascus University

Jawad Abu Hatab (Arabic: جواد أبو حطب; born 26 January 1962) is a Syrian politician. Prior to his election as prime minister, he worked as a heart surgeon and served in various roles within the Syrian opposition.

== Early life and career ==
Hatab was born in 1962 in Damascus. He completed his higher education at the medical school of Damascus University in 1988. He subsequently worked as a heart surgeon at the Cardiac Surgery Hospital located within the hospital. Hatab travelled to Italy in 2003 and completed his studies to become a paediatric cardiologist.

== Political career ==
After the Syrian civil war broke out, Hatab served in various administrative roles within the Syrian opposition. In May 2016 he was appointed by the Syrian National Coalition as Prime Minister of the Turkish-supported Syrian Interim Government. During his tenure, he sought to improve service delivery in opposition-controlled areas and relocate opposition government officials from Turkey to Syria.

He served both as Minister of Defence and prime minister in the Syrian Interim Government, resigning on 10 March 2019.
