= Manbij offensive (2016) =

Kurdish-led operation in the Syrian Civil War

Coordinates: 36.5267°N 37.9564°E

- Part of the Rojava–Islamist conflict and the American-led intervention in the Syrian Civil War
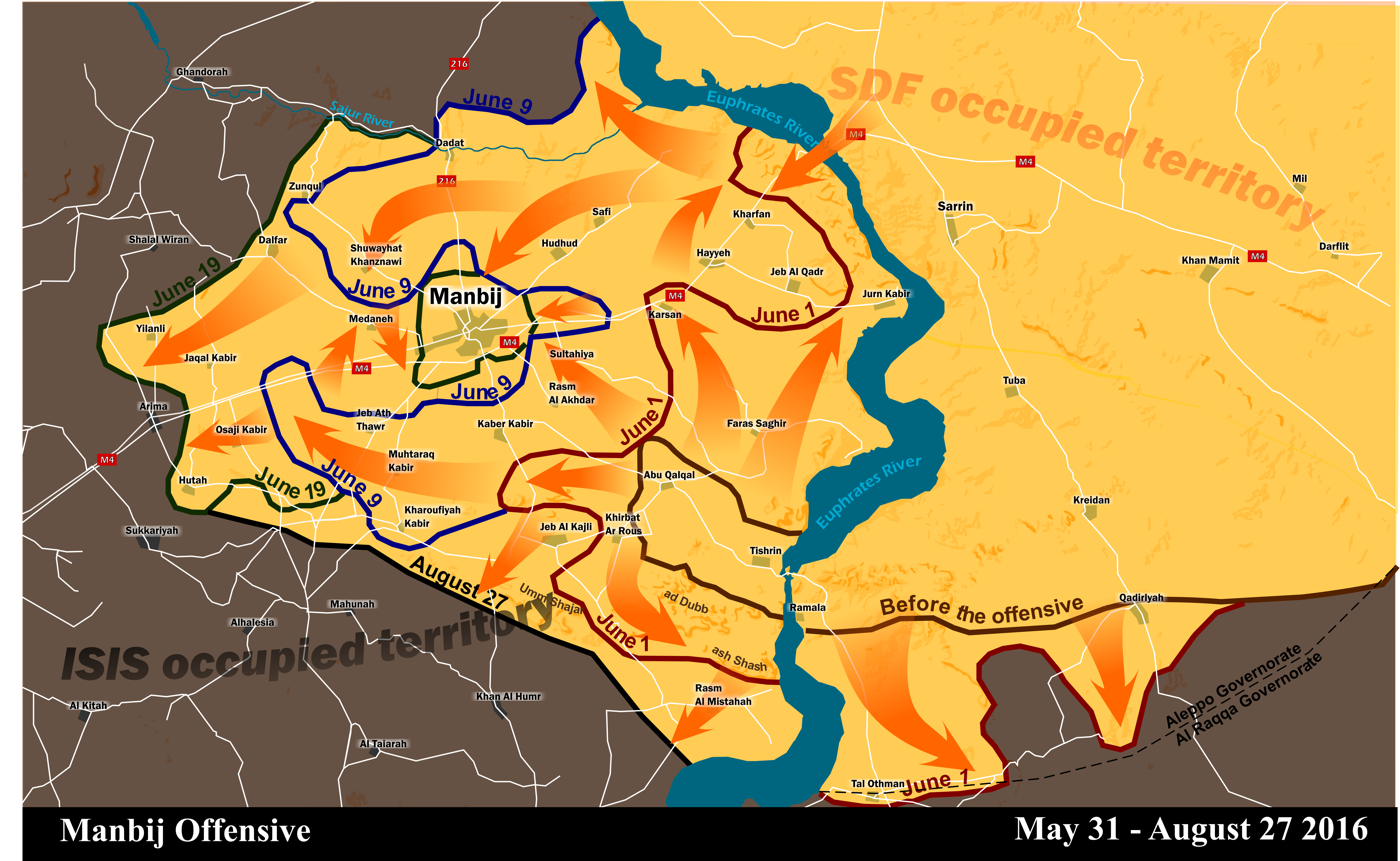
- Map showing SDF territorial gains during the offensive
Date	31 May – 27 August 2016 (2 months, 3 weeks and 6 days)
Location	Aleppo Governorate, Syria
Result	Major SDF victory; SDF captures ~105 villages and farms by 14 June; SDF captures Manbij city by 12 August; SDF secures defensive line in the northern countryside by 21 August, and continues offensive in the southern countryside until 27 August; Formation of Al-Bab Military Council; Beginning of the Turkish military intervention in Syria on 24 August

Belligerents
Syrian Democratic Forces; International Freedom Battalion; YBŞ; YJÊ; Supported by: CJTF–OIR: United States; United Kingdom (alleged); France; Germany (denied by Germany)	Islamic State

Commanders and leaders
Adnan Abu Amjad (Council general commander & Northern Sun Battalion deputy commander); Abu Layla (DOW) (Northern Sun Battalion commander); Yousif Abdo Sa'don (POW) (Northern Sun Battalion security officer, alleged); Botan Türkmeni (Manbij Revolutionaries Battalion commander); Mustafa Manbij (Manbij Revolutionaries Battalion commander); Rojda Felat (YPJ commander); Abdel Sattar al-Jader † (Jarabulus Military Council and Euphrates Jarabulus Brigades chief commander); Muhammad Ahmed (Jarabulus Military Council commander); Haqi Kobani (YPG commander); Abdelaziz Yunis (SDF senior commander); Merxas Kobanê (SDF commander); Mohammed Abu Amdil (SDF commander); Habun Osman (SDF commander); Şervan Afrin (SDF commander); Diyar Şexler (SDF commander); Heval Shiyar (SDF commander); Judi Derek (SDF commander) "Koçber" (YJÊ commander)	(Islamic State) Osama al-Tunisi † (Emir of Manbij); Abu Khalid al-Tunisi † (1st replacement Emir of Manbij); Abu Omaar al-Muhajiri (2nd replacement Emir of Manbij); Abu Yahya al-Shami (commander of Manbij by August); Abu Muhamad al-Kahtani † (Emir in Manbij); Abu Jihad al-Rusi (Islamic State) Dahham al-Hussein † (Emir of Um Mayyal); Abu Hamza al-Ansari † (ISIL senior leader); Abu Suheyl El-Maarawî † (commander of western Manbij); Abu Aisha † (commander of eastern Manbij); Abu Talha al-Shami † (ISIL senior commander); Abu Hadid † (ISIL senior commander); Abu al-Hayjaa † (Hisba police chief of Manbij) (Islamic State) Abu Huzaifa al-Ordoni † (ISIL field commander) (Islamic State) Hasan Rimo † (pro-ISIL tribal leader) (Islamic State) Safi Yahiya Rajab † (security official of Manbij) (Islamic State) Unknown Moroccan ISIL field commander † (Islamic State) Leading Sharia official of Manbij † (Islamic State) Ezzit Raad † (prominent battalion commander)

Units involved
Syrian Democratic Forces; Manbij Military Council; Northern Sun Battalion; Manbij Turkmen Brigade; Seljuq Brigade; Manbij Revolutionaries Battalion; YPG; YPJ; MFS; pro-SDF local Arab tribes; Jarabulus Military Council (since 22 August); Euphrates Jarabulus Brigades; Jarabulus Hawks Brigades; Free Jarabulus Brigades; International Freedom Battalion; MLKP; United Freedom Forces; Martyr Mahir Arpaçay Battalion; Asayish; Self-Defense Forces (HXP); Civilian Defense Force (HPC); Khabour Guards; United States Armed Forces; United States Air Force; 432d Wing; U.S. SOF; (United Kingdom) British SOF (alleged); (France) French SOF; German KSK (denied by Germany)	Military of ISIL; Wilayat Halab; pro-ISIL local tribes; Army of Aleppo; Inghimasi units; Russian-speaking battalion; Hisba police

Strength
2,900–12,000 fighters: 2,500–9,600 Arabs (1,800 locals); 400–2,400 Kurds; (Germany) c. 50	Several thousand fighters: 2,000 in Manbij

Casualties and losses
315 killed (SOHR claim); 1,650 killed (ISIL claim); 264 killed (SDF claim); 700–1,000 killed (other claims)	1,026 killed (SOHR claim); 400 killed (ISIL claim); 4,180 killed, 112 captured (SDF claim)
- 444 civilians killed and 2,000+ abducted ~78,000 civilians displaced

The Manbij offensive, code-named Operation Martyr and Commander Faysal Abu Layla, was a 2016 military offensive operation by the Syrian Democratic Forces (SDF) to capture the city of Manbij from the Islamic State (IS), and eventually, the ISIS-held areas through Al-Bab to Herbel, in the area referred to as the "Manbij Pocket" (Note: The "Manbij Pocket" region in the northern Aleppo Province, itself the focus of this offensive, is also locally known as the al-Shahba region.) in the northern Aleppo Governorate. The main goal of the offensive was to cut off ISIL's last supply routes from Turkey, and to prevent ISIS fighters from escaping across the Syria–Turkey border. For the first five days of the offensive, the US-led coalition conducted over 55 airstrikes in support of the SDF. After capturing Manbij city on 12 August, the SDF announced that the offensive would continue until the whole countryside around Manbij was captured, though the offensive effectively ended shortly after Turkey, who regard the YPG elements in the SDF as a terrorist organisation, initiated Operation Euphrates Shield to prevent the SDF uniting the regions of Rojava.

== Preparations ==
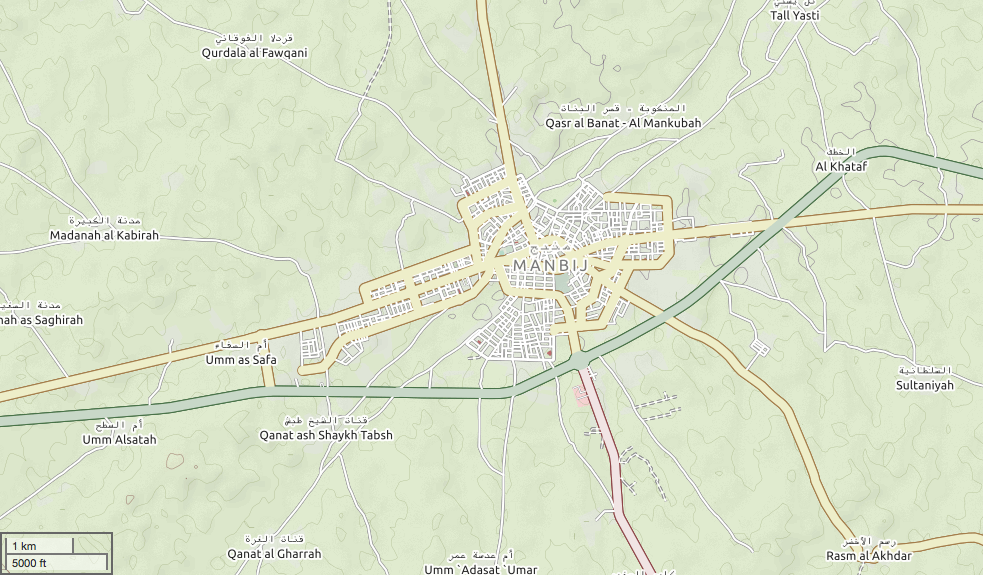
Layout of Manbij city.

In late December 2015, the SDF captured the Tishrin Dam and crossed the Euphrates, capturing the town of Tishrin and other nearby areas from ISIL, paving the way for a future offensive toward Manbij.

By 30 March 2016, the United States Air Force had conducted 25 airstrikes against the Islamic State. On 2 April, six non-YPG factions of the Syrian Democratic Forces (SDF) formed the Manbij Military Council (MMC) in preparation for the attack on Manbij. Most of the groups were part of the Northern Sun Battalion.

On 3 April, the U.S. asked for Turkey's support for the Manbij offensive, but the Turkish government made two demands in exchange for helping the international military intervention against ISIL; first, that the Syrian Arab tribes to be included in the Manbij operation should leave the SDF, and second, that the U.S. should increase its airstrikes in support of Turkish-backed Syrian rebels. On 4 April, according to a Turkish source, a group of U.S. military and intelligence staff traveled to Turkey to work on a plan for an operation to capture Manbij. The Turkish government later stated that it would not participate nor contribute to the offensive, because of the involvement of the Kurdish-majority People's Protection Units (YPG), and because it was beyond the range of artillery stationed in Turkey. When the offensive started, the Washington Post reported it under the headline of "Ignoring Turkey, U.S. backs Kurds in drive against ISIS in Syria".

On 5 April, a civilian council was formed in the town of Sarrin under the auspices of the Autonomous Administration of North and East Syria, of Manbij people who had fled when the Islamic State took over. The council consisted of Arabs, Kurds, Syrian Turkmen, and Circassians, and was created to administer Manbij after its capture. When international media interest in ethnic issues surged after the start of the offensive, Sheikh Farouk al-Mashi, an Arab former member of the Syrian parliament and designated co-chairman of the Manbij City Council, stated: "I have a Syrian ID, and Kurds have a Syrian ID. Let those people who talk against us in Turkey and Europe come here and fight ISIS. Why this distortion in media about problems between Kurds and Arabs?" Kurdish fellow co-chairman Salih Haji Mohammed stated: "In our social contract, we say we want to have good relations with neighboring countries like Turkey. Any country that does not interfere in Manbij and our areas, we will have good relations with."

On 31 May, the US announced that they would support the offensive and send supporting troops to the area. A US official stated that "Syrian Arab fighters would be the ones to stabilize and secure it once Islamic State is gone". The same day the offensive started, the Syrian Observatory for Human Rights (SOHR) stated "most of the fighters were from the Kurdish Popular Protection Units (YPG) militia". However, the next day, Turkish President Recep Tayyip Erdoğan said that around 3,000 SDF fighters were joining the operation and that some 2,500 of them were Arabs, while around 450 were from the YPG. Furthermore, two coalition spokesmen reiterated Arab fighters were leading the offensive, while Kurdish forces were in support, and one stated the reports that were suggesting the offensive was Kurdish-led were inaccurate. Another report stated, per local activists, that 60 percent of the attacking force were Arabs from Manbij. This was also confirmed by a MMC commander, who said that 60 percent of the attacking force were Arabs and 40 percent Kurds, Turkmen and other ethnic groups, while an SDF fighter gave his perspective as "we have Arabs, Kurds, nobody knows how many exactly, we all work under the SDF-forces".

== The offensive ==
=== The SDF capture the eastern countryside ===
On 31 May 2016, the Syrian Democratic Forces launched the offensive for the "Manbij Pocket" (al-Shahba) region, with small numbers of US Special Forces assisting with tactical operations and planning near the frontlines. The SDF captured three villages and the al-Gharra Mountain from ISIL, located southeast of the ISIL stronghold of Manbij. This advancement put the SDF and YPG within 15 kilometres of Manbij. The offensive was launched from two directions, from the Tishrin Dam area and the ruins of the Qara Qozak Bridge, near Sarrin. It was reported that US Special Forces constructed an Armoured vehicle-launched bridge (AVLB) at the site of the destroyed Qara Qozak Bridge, to enable SDF forces to cross the Euphrates River. On 1 June, the SDF captured Najam Castle, on the west bank of the Euphrates River, across from Sarrin, and linked the two fronts east of Manbij, advancing along the M4 Highway and the west bank of the Euphrates. These advances nearly doubled the SDF-held territory near Manbij since the start of the offensive, and brought the SDF within 12 kilometers of Manbij.

On 3 June, Abu Layla, a leading commander of the Manbij Military Council, was severely injured during the clashes with ISIL. He was subsequently moved to Sulaymaniyah in Iraqi Kurdistan for treatment but he died of his wounds two days later; the offensive was subsequently named after him in his honor. By this point, SDF forces had captured around 50 villages and almost 400 square kilometers of land from ISIL, within the past week.

=== Encirclement of Manbij ===
Map showing SDF envelope ISIL-held Manbij

On 4 June, the SDF captured another eight villages, and cut the road between Manbij and Ar-Raqqah. Heavy fighting continued on 5 June, five kilometers from Manbij. On 5 June, the SDF captured the village of Awn Dadat, north of Manbij, severing the Jarabulus-Manbij road. SDF forces also captured Khirbat Hisan, Malla Saad, and Safiya, to the north of Manbij, killing dozens of ISIL militants. By early 6 June, it was reported that the SDF had captured 10 more villages from ISIL near Manbij, including Kabir al-Kabir, located 5 km south of Manbij, putting ISIL in a state of high alert. Due to the SDF advancement and the ongoing encirclement of Manbij, ISIL was reportedly beginning to transfer fighters from the Azaz frontline to Manbij, in order to reinforce their positions against the SDF.

On 6 June, ISIL fighters were reportedly fleeing Manbij with their families, while ISIL attempted to regain control over Om Ezam village and its vicinity. That day, the SDF took the Jarabulus-Manbij road and two villages east of Manbij. By the evening, SDF fighters were within two kilometers south of Manbij. Furthermore, two ISIL leaders were killed by airstrikes on Jarabulus: Abu Huzaifa Alordoni and Hasan Rimo.

On 7 June, the SDF captured six more villages and farms around Qara Qoqaz bridge.

On 8 June, ISIL started to abandon its frontline against the Turkish-backed rebels north of Aleppo to reinforce Manbij, while the SDF captured two more villages. That morning, the rebels launched surprise simultaneous attacks from Mare' and Azaz to push back ISIL forces, which offered only token resistance.

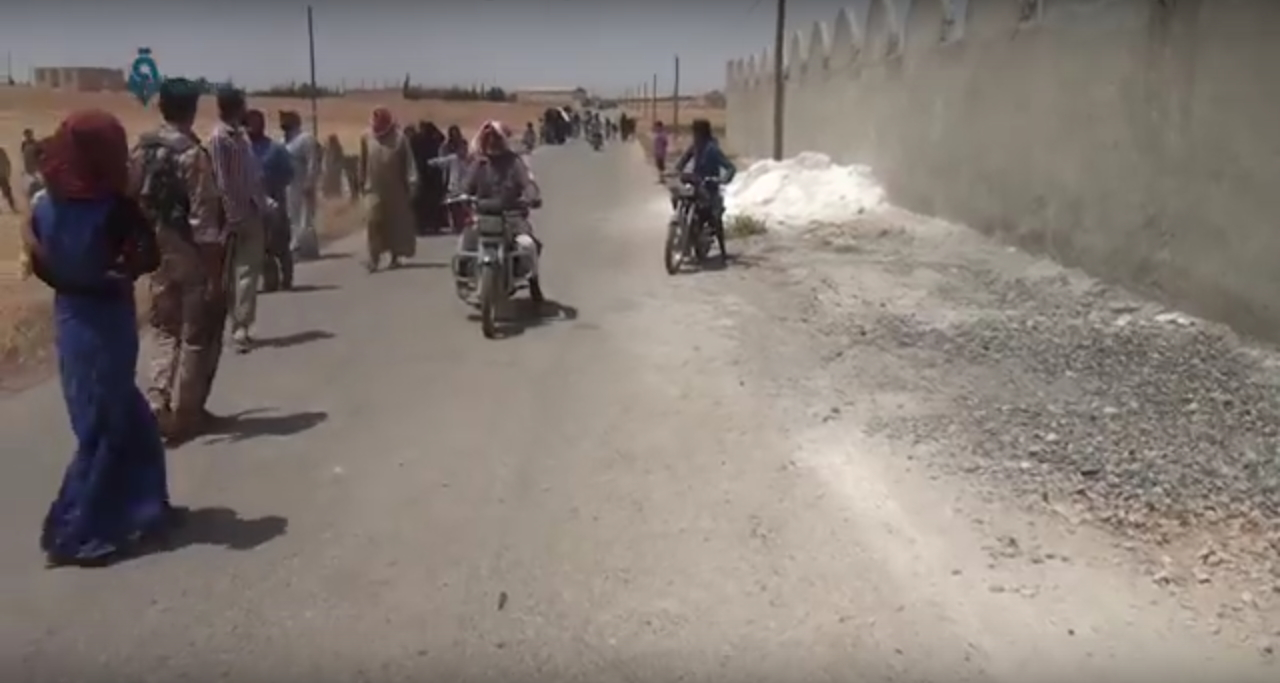
Civilians flee Manbij city.

On 9 June, the SDF was trying to complete its siege on Manbij, advancing on its eastern, northern and southern side, capturing several villages in the progress. Later that day, SDF forces reached the Manbij-Aleppo road; the last major route going out of the city. According to the Syrian Observatory for Human Rights (SOHR), 49 ISIL militants and one SDF fighter were killed in the past 36 hours. The SDF announced that the emir of Manbij, Osama al-Tunisi, was among the ISIL casualties, releasing footage of his corpse. According to local activists and SDF officials, Osama had attempted to escape from the city to Al-Bab with his family and bodyguards; all of them were subsequently killed by SDF artillery bombardment. ARA News reported that Osama al-Tunisi's escape attempt and death "indicates the collapse of ISIS in the city under the ongoing operation by the western-backed SDF troops". Nevertheless, ISIL forces launched a limited counter-offensive south of Manbij on the same day, claiming to have retaken a small number of villages. Osama al-Tunisi was subsequently succeeded by Abu Khalid al-Tunisi as new Emir of Manbij.

On 10 June, Manbij was completely besieged by the SDF, with all of the routes leading to Manbij cut off by SDF forces, trapping 2,000 ISIL fighters and several thousand civilians inside the city. Meanwhile, SDF forces continued to advance west of Manbij, reaching within 17 kilometers of Al-Bab by 11 June.

The next day, SDF fighters advanced further, attacking the village of Um Mayyal, which served as ISIL headquarters for the countryside west of Manbij. In course of the following fierce battle, Dahham al-Hussein, ISIL emir and field commander, was killed and the village taken by the SDF. Between 12 and 13 June, an ISIL counterattack reportedly recaptured six villages around Manbij. On 13 June, it was reported that before their withdrawal from the countryside of Manbij, ISIL militants broke into civilians' houses in dozens of villages, killing the men and raping the women.

By 14 June, the SDF had captured 105 villages and farms, while intense airstrikes targeted the northern and eastern vicinity, and outskirts of Manbij city, to prepare for the eventual assault on the city. Following a report by the Syrian Observatory for Human Rights, the Syrian government "strongly condemned" the presence of French and German special forces on Syrian territory. While France's defense minister had previously announced its special forces would help the SDF advance towards Manbij, a German Foreign Office spokesman declared the accusation to be "false", stating that there were no German special forces.

According to sources given to journalist Vincent Nouzille, French Special Forces alongside operators from the Directorate-General for External Security (DGSE) were particularly involved in the fighting, with "dozens" of ground operations in the area. Former French President François Hollande would later admit in an interview that "the defense council showed a willingness on the part of the general staff to take on more and more special operations and those of the DGSE to continue its very military actions."

On 15 June, ISIL launched another breakout attempt from Manbij city, reportedly recapturing two nearby villages. The next day, SDF forces were not only able to reverse the recent ISIL gains, but also captured two more villages near Manbij, Tal Rafi'i and Yaleeni, after hard fighting with ISIL defenders. SDF troops also advanced into Manbij, capturing the city's Hatabat district. In course of the fighting, ISIL's local Hisba police chief, Abu al-Hayjaa, was killed by SDF fighters.

On 17 June, heavy clashes were reported at the western entrance of Manbij, while SDF forces continued to advance against the remaining ISIL-held villages at the city's outskirts. SDF commanders claimed that some ISIL fighters disguised themselves as women in an attempt to flee the encircled city. Later on the same day, SDF forces entered the western part of Manbij city, killing over 26 ISIL militants. By this point, several Arab tribes of the Shahba region had also joined the SDF after a secret meeting.

=== Battle in Manbij's outskirts ===
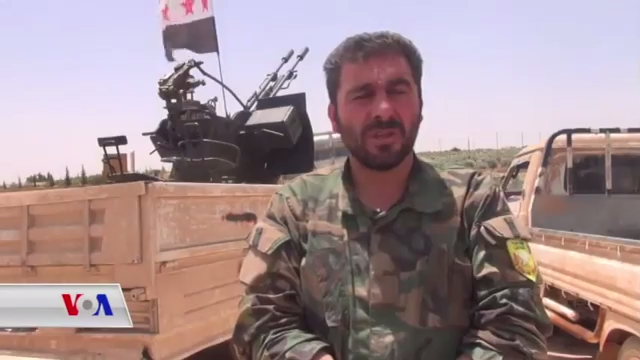
Muhammad Mustafa ("Abu Adel"), the general commander of the Northern Sun Battalion, during the battle in Manbij.

On 18 June, SDF forces reached the western entrance of Manbij, two kilometers from the city center, in the process inflicting heavy casualties on ISIL, including two killed senior commanders. By the next day the SDF had secured the crucial Al-Kitab crossroad in western Manbij, while they continued to assault the ISIL-held villages of Yasta and Eyn En-Nexîl northeast of the city. The two villages were eventually captured after heavy clashes, depriving ISIL forces of their last strongholds in Manbij's outskirts. Subsequently, a SDF field commander claimed that the SDF had captured all villages around Manbij from ISIL, and that the situation for the besieged forces in the city became dire. He reported that some ISIL emirs had attempted to bribe the SDF to let them flee the city. Furthermore, clashes between SDF and ISIL took place near al-Kawkali and al-Arima, where ISIL forcibly conscripted 200 locals to fight against the SDF.

The next day, the coalition intensified their airstrikes in order to assist the SDF, while the latter continued to advance into Manbij. In course of these airstrikes, Abu Hamza al-Ansari, another leading ISIL commander of the city, was killed. Despite their losses, ISIL forces reportedly continued to defend their positions in Manbij fiercely.

On the morning of 20 June, ISIL fighters attacked forces of the SDF from the side of al-Bab, Jarabulus and the village of Arima in an attempt to break the siege of Manbij. The clashes continued until the afternoon, with ISIL forces retaking three villages before they were repelled by SDF forces. Both sides suffered heavy casualties, with the SDF losing 28 fighters and ISIL suffering over 140 dead and much lost matériel. As a result of the SDF advance, ISIL initiated mass arrests of Kurdish civilians in many towns and villages of the northern Aleppo countryside. Activists expressed fear that the civilians would be used as human shields. In two villages, the locals revolted against ISIL fighters when they attempted to kidnap women, resulting in clashes that left six civilians dead.

With some western parts of the city on Manbij proper under SDF control, a humanitarian corridor was opened between the city and its captured countryside on 22 June in order to assist civilians evacuating the city.

The next day, SDF broke into the Manbij Silos, one of the most important ISIL strongholds in the city. According to U.S. officials, despite their recent defeats ISIL forces in Manbij did not show signs of faltering and were expected to fight till the last for the city.

By 23 June, while there were heavy clashes in the outskirts, the SDF further advanced into the town. SDF forces broke into the city's southern perimeter resulting in heavy street fighting. Two SDF fighters were killed by an explosive device. Al-Masdar News reported that "hundreds" of ISIL fighters still remained in the city, "with many locals volunteering to become suicide bombers". Furthermore, the number of abducted Kurdish civilians in the northern Aleppo countryside had risen to 900.

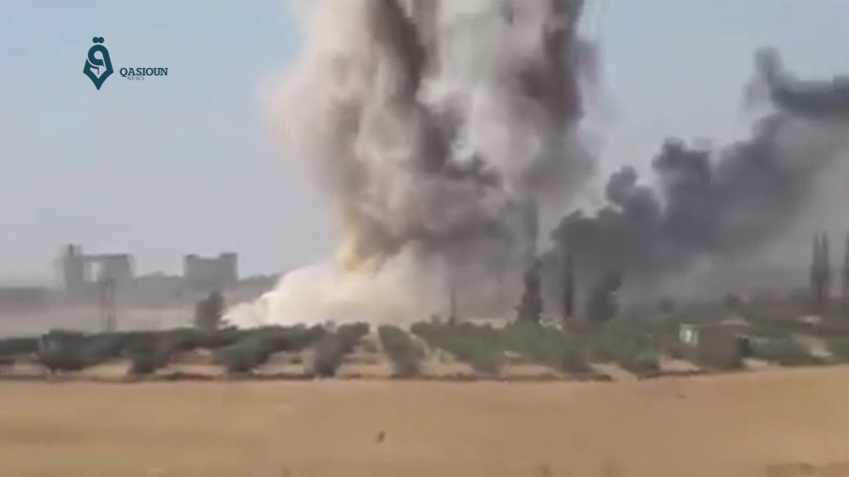
Explosions near the silos in southern Manbij.

On 24 June, the Manbij Silos at the southern entrance to the city, a site that had seen fierce fighting for days, were reported under control of the SDF. Furthermore, the SDF also captured the Akhdar farms south of the city as well as the local Sharia School in the western suburb, which ISIL had reportedly used as training camp for fighters.

In the course of clashes on the same day in western Manbij, Turkish Alevi MLKP volunteer Sevda Çağdaş was killed while fighting ISIL. Furthermore, the YPG claimed that the Turkish Army had shelled Kurdish-held villages west of Kobanî in order to support an ISIL raid across the Euphrates; the ISIL fighters were eventually repelled.

YPG forces also claimed that the Turkish Army had once again shelled their positions in the northern Kobanî Canton to support ISIL.

The next day, SDF made major progress in Manbij, capturing the Al-Hawatimah and Al-Haram neighborhoods in the northern and the Al-Hawani neighborhood in the southwestern parts of the city. The SDF further claimed to have broken through the ISIL defences south of Manbij, with their main force now one kilometer away from the city's main market.

On the morning of 28 June, ISIL fighters launched a counterattack from Jarablus, attempting to break through SDF defenses at the northern front. After three hours of fighting at Qirat village, the attack was repelled. Later on, SDF fighters broke into the Transportation Department in Manbij, which was cleared of ISIL combatants by midnight. The SDF also took control of some parts of the city's Hazawna district.

The next day, especially heavy clashes were reported in the northern and southern parts of Manbij, with SDF fighters attempting to take control of the Al-Matahin crossroad. If they captured the crossroad, the SDF would be able to advance into the city center. Meanwhile, progress by the SDF in eastern and western Manbij was slowed by ISIL mines.

The US-backed rebels have seized piles of propaganda leaflets, maps and cellphones as they push to recapture the Syrian city of Manbij. A batch of more than 10,000 documents also contains textbooks, laptops, and digital storage devices. "Exploitation of this information is ongoing to better understand [Islamic State] networks and techniques, including the systems [used] to manage the flow of foreign fighters into Syria and Iraq", the US-led anti-ISIL campaign's spokesman, Colonel Chris Garver, said Wednesday.

By 30 June, the SDF had "gained a critical foothold" in southern Manbij, even though their progress was hindered by many landmines. ISIL fighters had also dug tunnels in the city, enabling them to launch surprise attacks on the SDF and thus further slowing down the latter's progress. Nevertheless, the SDF managed to capture the Al-Asadiyê neighborhood, where Abu Layla's old home was located, and to further advance toward the city center despite heavy ISIL resistance.

=== First major ISIL counter-offensive ===
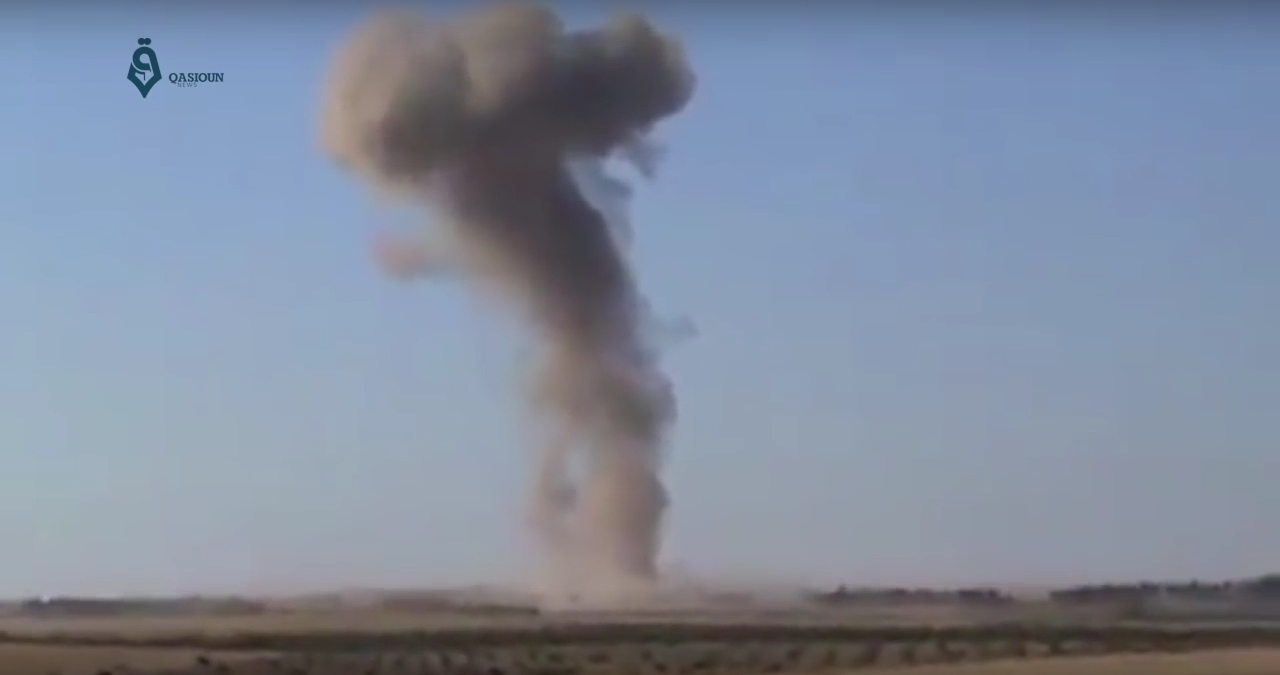
An ISIL car bomb is destroyed by a missile strike near Manbij.

Beginning on 1 July, ISIL forces launched a counter-offensive in an attempt to break the siege of Manbij and to evacuate their besieged forces. ISIL fighters attacked on all fronts, although their most intense assault targeted the SDF-held village of Dadat at the northern front near Jarabulus. There, the ISIL attackers were repelled only after heavy fighting. The next day, ISIL attacked Dadat again, finally storming it. At the same time, besieged ISIL forces in Manbij launched an outbreak attempt, reportedly recapturing the Jelawi neighborhood in the northern parts of the city and Khataf village east of Manbij.

On 3 July, there were contradictory reports over the progress of the ISIL counter-offensive. Whereas ANF News reported that the SDF had repelled ISIL attacks at the northern, western, and southern front, al-Masdar News claimed that a major ISIL attack from the south had succeeded in recapturing two mountains and seven villages. SOHR simply reported heavy clashes at all fronts, with both sides suffering heavy casualties. Shervan Derwish, official spokesperson for the Syrian Democratic Forces, maintained on Facebook that the forces of the Manbij Military Council (MMC) had clashed throughout the day with ISIL militants on three fronts in the Manbij area. But the militants had fled the area, he stated, with MMC forces pursuing them. The SDF also reportedly made further progress in Manbij, although they were restricted in their use of heavy weapons due to ISIL using civilians as human shields. According to Reuters, based on SOHR sources, all ISIL attacks against SDF positions that had taken place on 3 and early 4 July had been repelled, although the SDF also had reportedly made no to little progress in Manbij over the preceding ten days.

On 4 July, however, SOHR claimed that the ISIL attacks of the previous day had actually succeeded in capturing some territory from the SDF, but that these gains remained strategically insignificant, as the ISIL had been unable to open a corridor to its besieged forces in Manbij. Farsnews further reported that the SDF had recaptured most of the lost villages. Furthermore, a SDF commander claimed that the failed ISIL counter-attacks showed the group's desperation to save their trapped fighters in Manbij, whose situation became increasingly dire.

The next day, ISIL released footage that showed the brother of Abu Layla, Yousif Abdo Sa'don, as their prisoner. In the video, the tortured Yousif claimed to have worked as internal security officer for the Northern Sun Battalion, and that the SDF had suffered high casualties in the battle for Manbij. Kurdish sources confirmed that Yousif had been detained by ISIL, though hinted that he was only a civilian. Meanwhile, in an effort to tip the balance in the fierce fight to free the city from ISIL, SDF forces in Manbij had called in reinforcements from Kobani, Al-Hasakah and Qamishli.

In the night of 5–6 July, ISIL forces in Manbij launched a counter-attack to an attempt to recapture the Al-Sherîa junction. After heavy, hour-long fighting, the assault was repelled by SDF fighters. SOHR also reported heavy clashes in Mankubah village at the outskirts of Manbij, as ISIL launched a major attempt to break through the SDF siege. The assault was eventually repelled; nevertheless, the recent ISIL counter-attacks had led to a stalemate in Manbij, with the SDF unable to significantly advance further into the city.

=== Battle for Manbij's west and the city center ===
I sit in the window in my makkar
Kalashnikov at my shoulder and my trigger cocked
My brother on ribat has not slept for ages
The infidels don't dare to disturb him.
Allah wanted to test us in battle
[My] faith in Him I guard always
There are no better soldiers in this world
Than those who believe and fight boldly.
My wife, how long is it that I not seen you,
I know that you pine and that you love me.
I hope to live together in both worlds,
As in this world, as in the Paradise gardens.

— Translated poem of a ISIL fighter trapped in Manbij, shared on Russian-speaking ISIL channels

By 7 July, the SDF had further advanced into the city, coming within 1 km of the city center and capturing the southwestern neighborhoods of the city.

On 9 July, heavy clashes continued in Manbij city, especially in the al-Hezwania neighborhood, of which the SDF had reportedly captured 85%. In course of the fighting in Manbij on that day, Abu Khalid al-Tunisi, the ISIL emir of Manbij, was killed. He was subsequently replaced by Abu Omaar al-Muhajiri as leading local commander.

On 10 and 11 July, heavy fighting between SDF and ISIL fighters took place in the Sabaa Bahrat and al-Hezwania neighborhoods, as well as at the National (Watanî) Hospital. During the clashes near the hospital, a CJTF–OIR airstrike killed Abu Suheyl El-Maarawî, ISIL commander of western Manbij. In the Sabaa Bahrat and al-Hezwania neighborhoods, ISIL forces launched a last large-scale counter-attack, resulting fierce fighting, in course of which the ISIL security official of Manbij, Safi Yahiya Rajab, was killed. ISIL also launched another counter-attack along the Sajur River west of Dadat on 11 July, though the assault was repelled by the SDF.

From 11 to 13 July, the SDF made major progress in western Manbij, as it first split the ISIL pocket in a large eastern and small western half, the latter of which the SDF then mostly captured. After several days of heavy fighting, ISIL forces finally retreated from the Sabaa Bahrat and al-Hezwania neighbourhoods after suffering heavy casualties. Meanwhile, heavy fighting continued at the hospital and the Sharia square, where Abu Muhamad al-Kahtani, an ISIL emir, was killed. As their situation became increasingly desperate, the remaining ISIL fighters of Manbij reportedly had begun to negotiate with the SDF for a deal in which they would be allowed to peacefully leave Manbij for other ISIL strongholds. A SDF official declared in regard to the remaining ISIL fighters in Manbij, "Either they will surrender and give up, or fight against us until they die." Two reporters near Manbij were injured by an IED, with Mustafa Mohammed of Ronahi TV dying of his wounds five days later.

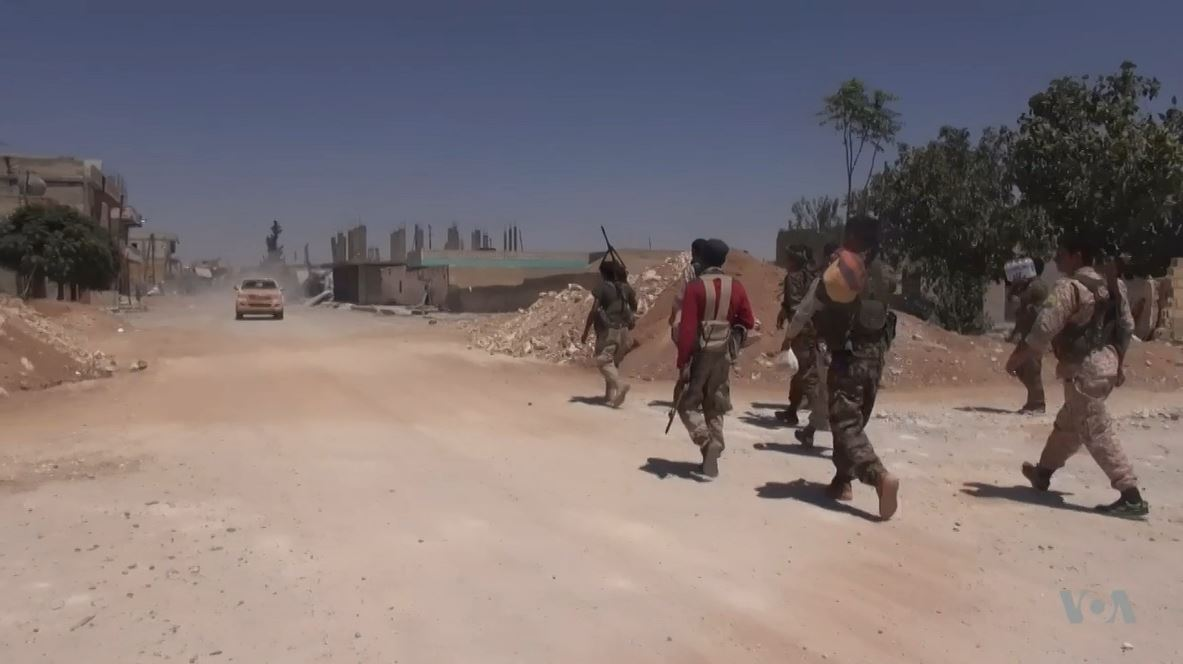
SDF fighters advance into Manbij.

On 16 July, the Fars News Agency claimed that the SDF had finally captured the National Hospital from ISIL fighters, which was later on confirmed by Reuters. Used as command center and logistics hub, the loss of the hospital was a heavy blow to local ISIL forces. Nevertheless, clashes around the hospital continued the next day, while SDF fighters reached the Al-Aqsa mosque. The YPG had also deployed their elite sniper teams to Manbij, inflicting heavy casualties on ISIL forces. At the same time, SDF fighters captured several sites north and west of the al-Hezwania neighborhood, while Levi Shirley (Heval Agir), a U.S. national fighting for the YPG was killed in Manbij. Furthermore, CJTF–OIR airstrikes hit six ISIL tactical units and destroyed 22 defense positions in Manbij.

On 18 and 19 July, ISIL launched counter-attacks in the northern, western and southern countryside in another attempt to break the siege of Manbij. The northern attack at the Sajur River failed disastrously, resulting in the death of 111 ISIL fighters and the SDF destroying several armored vehicles. In the south, however, ISIL claimed to have retaken the Al-Aqra Mountains, as well as the villages of Umm Al-Sirraj and Qarah Saghirah. In Manbij itself, heavy fighting continued, while the US Central Command stated that liberating the city would probably still take much time.

On 21 July, the SDF issued ISIL an ultimatum to leave the city along with their light weaponry within 48 hours, though ISIL did not respond to the offer. U.S. Army Colonel Christopher Garver, chief spokesman for the US military command in Iraq and Syria, commented that fighting was "very intense", describing it as "different than what we've seen in Fallujah [or] Ramadi" and concluding that "this is a fight like we haven't seen before." Fierce fighting continued during the next days in the city center, with the SDF attacking the Post Office and the Cultural Center. By 22 July, the SDF had reportedly captured 90% of western Manbij, though a number of small ISIL pockets in the area continued to resist, most notably at the Tetbekat Prison. On 24 July, ISIL attempted yet again to break the siege on Manbij, launching several attacks in the countryside. ISIL fighters attacked Osajli village in the southwest, Zinogil village in the northwest, and Til Sarraj in the south. All assaults were eventually repelled, but only after fierce fighting that continued until the next day.

On 25 July, Kurdish sources reported that SDF had retaken Bannawi neighbourhood and were fighting in al-Kejeli. SDF sources claimed that 51 ISIS fighters were killed during the clashes. The SOHR backed this claim up by stating that the SDF was advancing "in several areas in Manbij city, amid more casualties among both parties". The clashes in al-Kejeli continued throughout the following night, and resulted in the death of Abu Aisha, a Turkish ISIL emir and commander of eastern Manbij. However, even as ISIL forces retreated, they attempted to hamper the SDF's advances as much as possible. Thus, there are reports of ISIL fighters planting large numbers of bombs and landmines in Manbij's houses, shops, schools and other public places to detonate them while retreating from their positions.

=== Second major ISIL counter-offensive ===
On 28 July, ISIL launched a major counter-offensive in the western Manbij countryside. In course of this attack, the Islamists retook the villages of Yalanli, Qatwyran (Qurt Wiran), Qart, Al-Buwyr, Al-Jamousyah, and Al-Dandaniyah from the SDF. In Al-Buwyr, ISIL fighters then proceeded to execute 24 civilians. The Amaq News Agency also claimed that ISIL had recaptured the Bannawi neighbourhood in Manbij city. Pro-Kurdish news outlets such as Hawar News Agency disputed that the aforementioned villages had fallen, though it reported that clashes took place in the villages Bozgich and Misherfat in northwestern Manbij on the night of 28–29 July. It was also reported that the SDF had gained full control of the Kijli neighborhood in Manbij.

=== Battle for the last ISIL pockets and capture of Manbij city ===
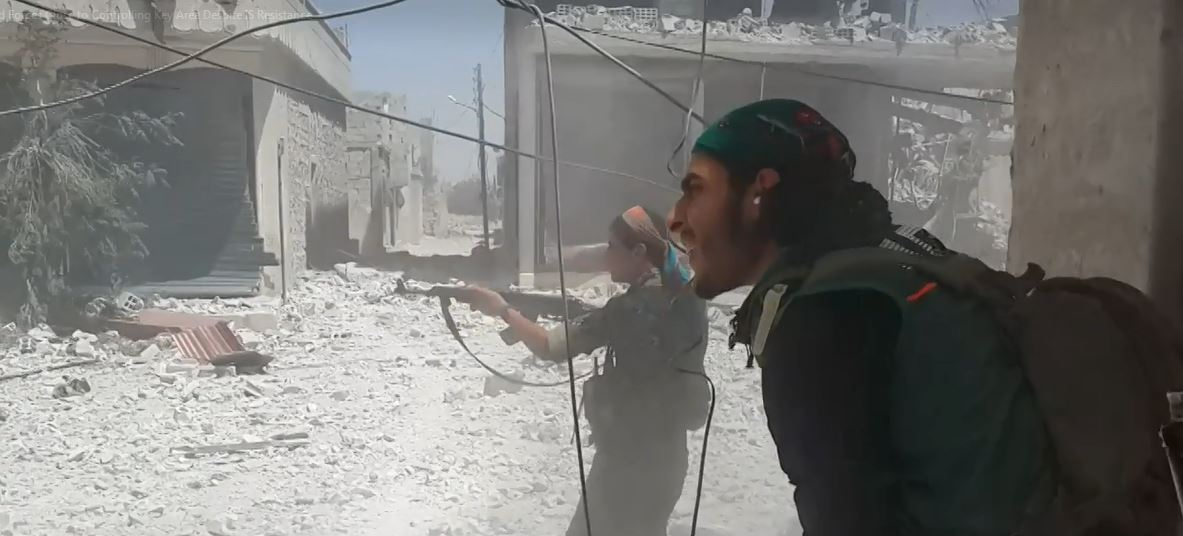
Arab and Kurdish fighters of the SDF fight their way into Manbij's city center, held by ISIL militants.

While ISIL forces continued their attacks in the countryside on 31 July, as heavy fighting was reported in Adasa village west of Manbij, the SDF achieved a number of breakthroughs in the city itself. SDF fighters captured the Al-Na'imi and Mestosaf neighborhoods, the Ghasania school and much of the Al-Jazeera road. According to SOHR, the SDF had by then captured 40% of Manbij, while Reuters reported that 70% of the city had fallen to the SDF, including most of the west, east and north. In consequence, ISIL forces were mostly confined to the old quarters in the central and southern city. By this point, 40,000 to 50,000 civilian residents of Manbij had fled the city, although a number of locals remained to volunteer with the SDF and had begun training to fight ISIL. Sometime in course of July, prominent Australian ISIL battalion commander Ezzit Raad was also killed in the city.

On 1 August, the SDF captured Jib Nashama village south of Manbij. The next day, SDF fighters again managed to break through ISIL frontlines in Manbij, seizing the Bujiya roundabout in the city center, and the Bashar Roundabout to the south. The SDF advances since late July had reduced the ISIL forces in Manbij to a number of isolated pockets, with different news outlets claiming that the SDF had taken 60–80% of the city. By 3 August, there was still bitter fighting at the Jazeera Road, where SDF fighters coming from the north and south attempted to cut off the ISIL troops in the east from the city center, to which most ISIL forces had begun to retreat. Meanwhile, the isolated ISIL pocket at Tetbekat Prison in western Manbij continued to resist. It was also reported that two more foreign YPG volunteers were killed in course of the fighting in the city: Dean Carl Evans, a British citizen, and Martin Gruden, a Slovenian citizen.

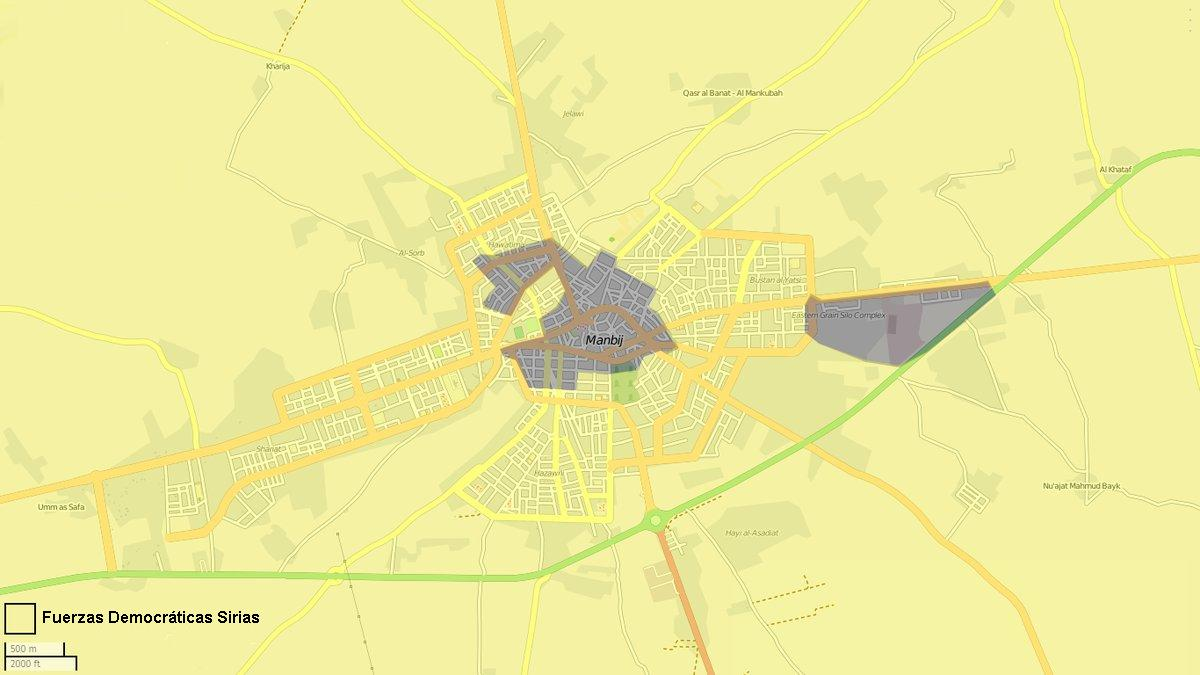
Situation in Manbij city on 5 August.

SDF fighters continued to advance over the following days, capturing Mankuba village in Manbij's northern outskirts, as well as the al-Hal market, the al-Thor school, the Sinaa and al-Tal neighborhoods in the city itself following heavy clashes. By 5 August, the SDF claimed to have taken 90% of the city. Despite these recent successes, fighting in the city remained fierce, and SDF continued to send reinforcements into the city. Pro-opposition media reported that 300 Asayish who had been ordered to join the frontlines had refused to do so, resulting in their arrest.

On late 6 August, the SDF overran ISIL positions in several parts of Manbij, bringing the city almost completely under their control. This led to a number of false reports that declared the city captured, even though fierce fighting continued for a number of ISIL pockets in the northern and central city; most importantly, ISIL fighters still held the Al-Sirb neighborhood and parts of the central market, where a minor ISIL counter-attack failed on the same day. The next day, the SDF claimed to have captured the İhyati Bakery, the central market, as well as the Bazaar and Sheikh Eqîl neighborhoods. Heavy fighting continued for several other parts of the city center, where ISIL fighters had taken many civilians hostage to use them as human shields.

Inform all our brothers that we will never accept withdrawal ever and that they must endure even if only one of them remains, and we have considered invalid the blood of all who withdraw without permission: i.e. you do not have any acceptance for what we have not permitted for you, and we will kill all who withdraw or encourage withdrawal and works for it, and we order you, Abu Yahya, to kill all who withdraw and prepare for it.

— Order of the ISIL war committee to the commander of the remaining ISIl forces in Manbij on 8 August

On 8 August, the SDF claimed that they had taken over 90% of the city center, with the ISIL forces mostly confined to a small pocket in the northern city. In the course of their retreat into the northern pocket, however, ISIL fighters had taken their civilian hostages with them. Due to this, the SDF offered a new deal to the Islamic State in Manbij in the form of free passage out of the city, if the militants released all civilians. In response the offer, the ISIL war committee sent a letter to Abu Yahya al-Shami, who had by then become commander of the surviving ISIL forces in Manbij. The ISIL leadership ordered him to not surrender or withdraw under any circumstances, but rather fight to the death. Any ISIL fighter who wanted to surrender or flee was to be killed, as were those who displayed a defeatist attitude or welcomed the defeat of ISIL in Manbij.

Meanwhile, the YPG also announced that another foreign volunteer, the Egyptian Badin al-Imam, had been killed during the battle for Manbij. A meeting of representatives for more than sixty local Arab tribes with SDF officials and Manbij Civilian Council members was organized at Abu Abrus village to discuss the future of the whole Manbij region after ISIL was driven off. The Manbij Civilian Council expressed their wishes for the area to fully join the Rojava federation, though said that the region could also choose self-administration or to become completely independent from Rojava. SDF officials said that they "want everyone to participate in administrating the city, whether they are against us or not". On the other side, SOHR claimed that the SDF had displaced Arabs in the countryside of Manbij; the SDF leadership denied this, saying that the concerned villages had not been cleared of mines yet, so if the residents were allowed to return they could die. One SDF official argued that "some civilians after three days of displacement already complain they cannot go back to their village. This is not realistic and they have to wait."

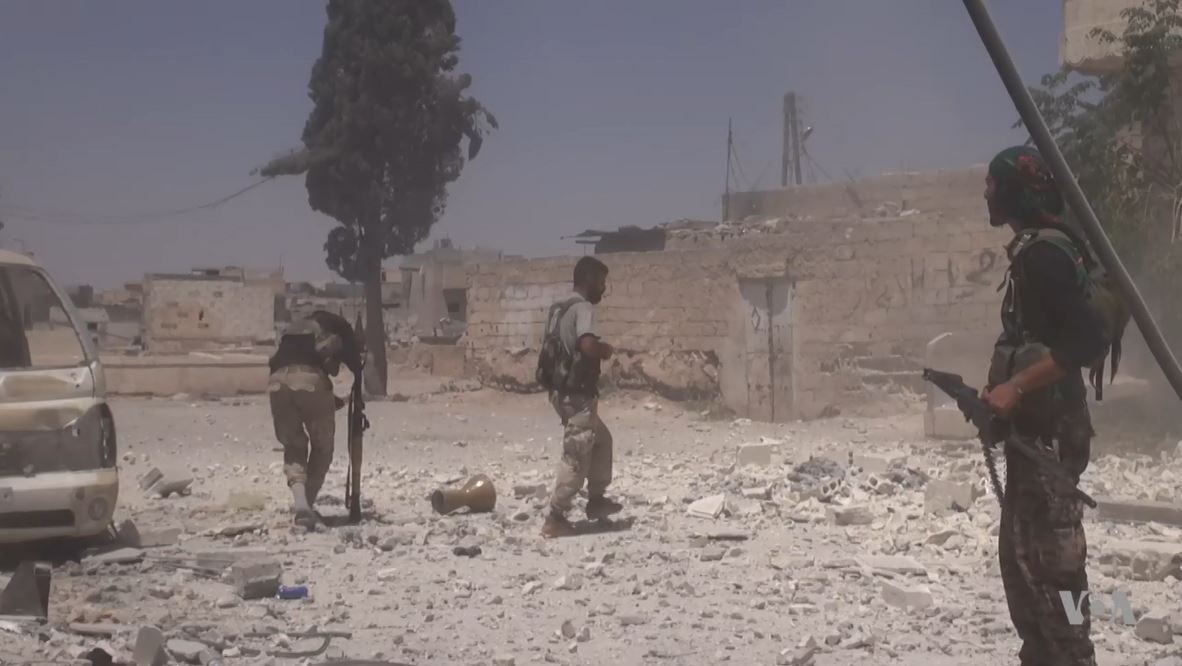
SDF fighters in Manbij.

By 9 August, ISIL fighters still held parts of the Cultural Center, Emel Hospital, a hotel, the Security Crossroad, a post office, the Al-Mûxeta market, the Al-Serab and Al-Cura neighborhoods, the Agriculture School and the Jarablus road, which they still defended fiercely amid slow SDF advances. Other pockets such as Tatbekat Prison had by then fallen, while al-Masdar News estimated that only around 100 ISIL fighters, mostly snipers, and their families were left in Manbij. Nevertheless, the few remaining ISIL forces held around 1,000 civilians hostage, which made any airstrikes and major attacks extremely difficult for the anti-ISIL coalition. During the night, ISIL forces attacked SDF positions in the northern countryside, though the assault was eventually beaten back.

On 10 August, seven ISIL "inghimasi" suicide bombers and fighters reportedly attacked a U.S. outpost near the Tishrin Dam, attempting to inflict as much damage as possible. The pro-ISIL Amaq News Agency claimed that at least 41 U.S. soldiers and Kurdish fighters were killed in resulting clashes, mostly by explosives. On the same day, the YPG announced the death of U.S. volunteer Jordan MacTaggart in course of the fighting in Manbij.

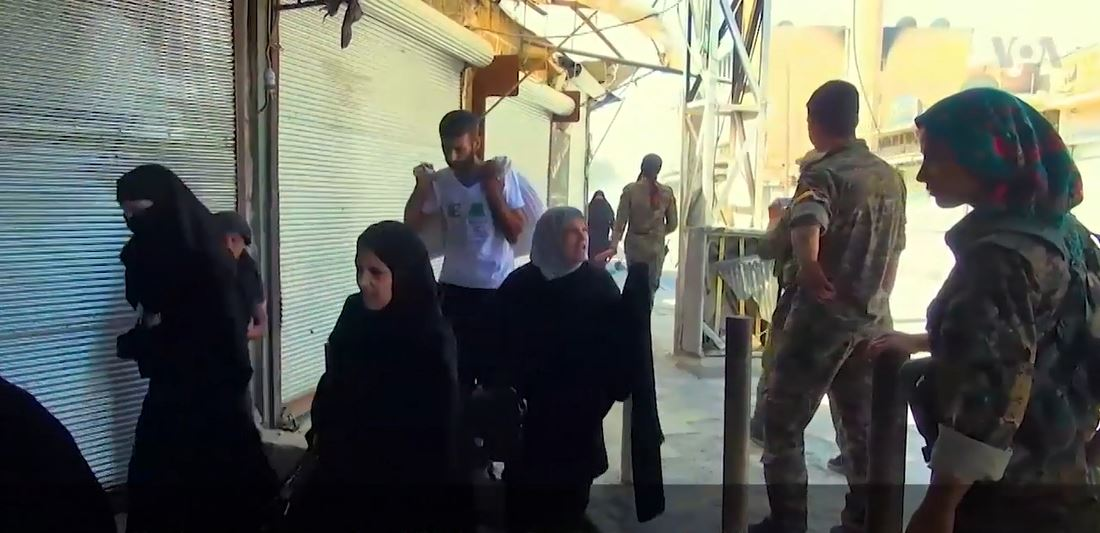
SDF fighters with civilians who have been freed after being held hostage by ISIL militants.

On 12 August, the SDF announced that they had launched a final assault to capture the last ISIL pockets. The remaining ISIL forces left Manbij later that day; around 500 vehicles containing the surviving ISIL fighters and civilians fled from the town towards Jarabulus. How the ISIL forces were able to leave unopposed was disputed; SOHR reported that a secret deal had taken place, with all pro-ISIL forces being allowed to leave peacefully for releasing the civilian hostages. The SDF leadership, on the other side, claimed that the ISIL forces had taken 2,000 civilians as human shields with them in order to flee to Jarabulus. Fars News reported yet another version of the events: Accordingly, a secret agreement had indeed taken place, which allowed the ISIL fighters to leave the city with their civilian supporters, but they had also taken some civilians hostage to prevent CJTF–OIR from bombing their convoy. After the ISIL fighters had left, the SDF declared the city fully captured, and began carrying out clearing operations in the area.

=== Continued offensive in the countryside and Jarabulus offensive ===
Two days after the capture of Manbij, the creation of the Al-Bab Military Council was announced for the planned offensive to take Al-Bab from the ISIL. Thousands of displaced people started returning to the city after ISIL was driven out, even though much of the city was destroyed and many ISIL mines still remained. Furthermore, there is no electricity, running water or medical care in the city. The SDF started shoring up defenses in the outlying neighborhoods of the city to defend against possible counterattacks.

On 15 August, the Manbij Military Council announced that it would continue the offensive to capture the countryside south and northeast of Manbij city. The next day, the SDF captured three villages in the southwestern countryside from the ISIL. On 18–19 August, the SDF took control of a number of villages in the northern, northeastern and southern countryside. By 20 August, the SDF had captured 16 villages since the conquest of Manbij. Manbij Military Council on 19 August issued a statement that the SDF had handed over the control of Manbij to it and had withdrawn from the city. At this point, the SDF declared that they had succeeded in establishing a defensive line against ISIL north of the Sajur River, ending their offensive in the northern countryside. In consequence, the SDF began to intensify their offensive in the southern countryside, capturing Al-Kasra and another village in the region on the 21 August.

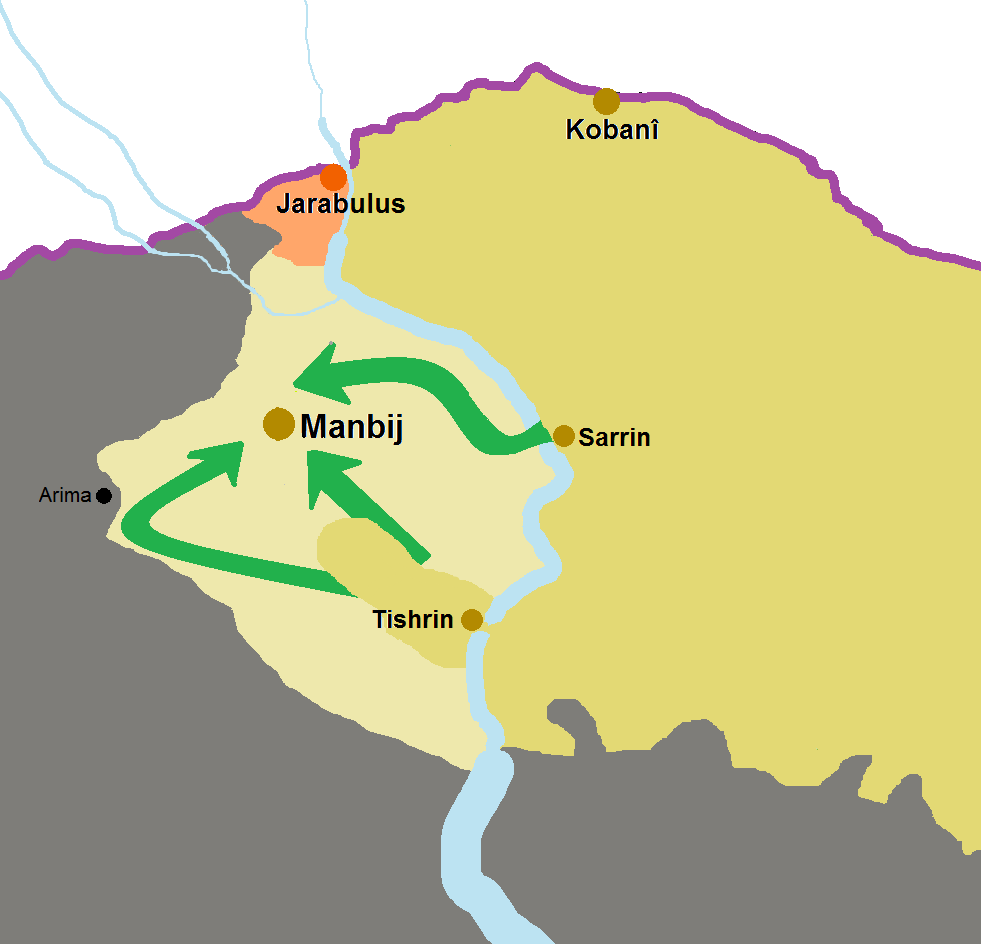
Territory held by the SDF (yellow), pro-Turkish forces (red), and ISIL (grey) by 28 August.

Even though the SDF had announced the end of their operations north of Manbij, three SDF groups declared the formation of the "Jarabulus Military Council" to take Jarabulus from ISIL on 22 August. The new council had a very negative stance toward Turkey, which the council members blamed for supporting ISIL, and warned "the Turkish state of the drastic consequences of its aggressive acts against the Syrian territories and its components, especially in our region in Jarablos". Just a few hours after the declaration, the leader of the council Abdel Sattar al-Jader was assassinated in al-Shyoukh at the Sajur River frontline by unknown gunmen, who may have belonged to the Turkish National Intelligence Organization according to the SDF. Al-Masdar News noted that the assassins could also have been members of ISIL, since al-Jabar was shot near the frontline. On the same day, the SDF captured 8 villages south of Manbij from ISIL, while the Turkish Army fired about 20 rounds of artillery strikes on SDF positions near Manbij with howitzers across the Syrian border after several stray shells from Syria landed inside Turkish territory.

On 24 August, the SDF continued to advance south of Manbij, repelling a minor ISIL counter-offensive and capturing another village. As Turkey and several Turkish-backed FSA groups launched their offensive to capture Jarabulus from ISIL, reportedly 3,000 civilians fled from the town to the SDF-controlled areas around Manbij. US Vice President Joe Biden demanded the same day, that the YPG should give Manbij over to Arab SDF forces and retreat to the eastern side of the Euphrates. The YPG, however, initially refused to withdraw from Manbij, while the Jarabulus Military Council groups declared that they would not give up their hometown to the Turkish-backed rebel groups which they considered "no different from ISIS". In consequence, when Turkish-backed FSA units forcibly attempted to enter the SDF-held village of Amarinah, they were met with resistance and were eventually driven off by the SDF. Secretary of State John Kerry however assured the Turkish Foreign Minister Çavuşoğlu on 25 August, that the SDF had started to retreat to the eastern side of the Euphrates. A spokesman for Operation Inherent Resolve later announced that the SDF had withdrawn across the Euphrates river in order to prepare for an offensive on Raqqa. The YPG later separately announced it had withdrawn to the east of Euphrates and said all military command along with all YPG-held positions was handed over to the Manbij Military Council.

Meanwhile, SDF units continued their offensive against ISIL during the day, as they took control of seven villages south of Jarabulus before the Turkish-backed rebels could capture them. On 26–27 August, while fighting near Jarabulus escalated, the SDF captured several more villages from ISIL south of the Tishrin Dam, with the Manbij Military Council later stating that it would send its forces north to aid the Jarabulus Military Council in its fight against Turkey and the Turkish-backed rebels.

== Aftermath ==
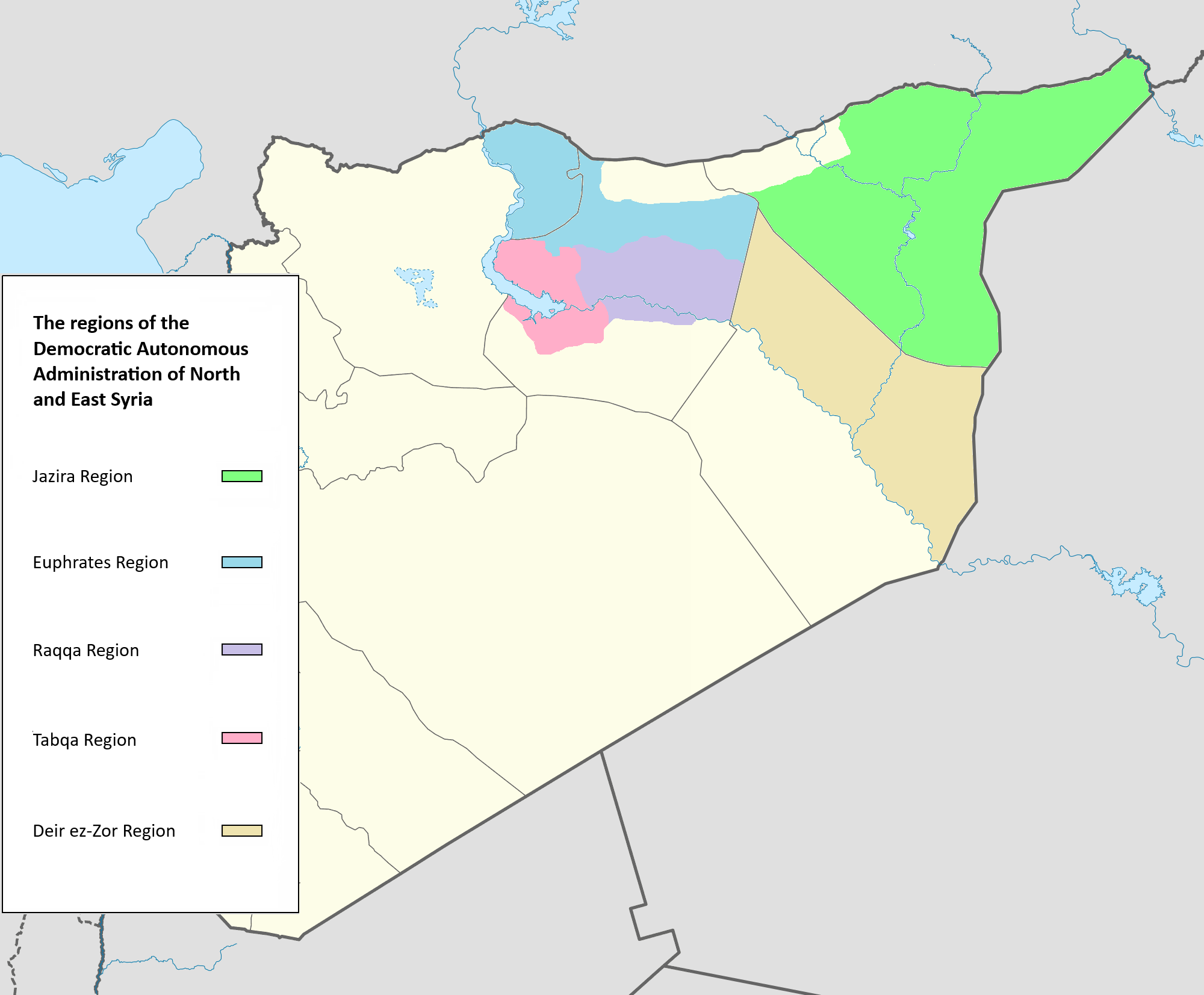
After the successful offensive, Manbij and its surroundings became part of the self-governing Manbij Region (dark blue) within the Autonomous Administration of North and East Syria

As Turkish-backed rebels overran SDF positions near Jarabulus, ISIL reportedly used this infighting among anti-ISIL forces to launch a counter-attack in the southern countryside, retaking Huthan village on 29 August. On 3 September the YPG and the YPJ repelled an attack on the village of Til Osman, 12 km southeast of the Tishrin Dam, and seized several small arms and ammunition after killing three IS fighters and capturing two of them. On 10 September, ISIL forces launched another counter-attack, aimed at retaking the villages of Khan al-Homr and Tal Aswad from the SDF.

After the offensive, Manbij and its surroundings were largely integrated into the Shahba region, whose government was formed by the Syrian National Democratic Alliance (TWDS), which aims to implement social reforms in the area. Thus, when a local police force was organized in October 2016, female recruits were included from the outset.

In late October and early November, the SDF further advanced west of Manbij, capturing several more villages as well as the significant town of Arima from ISIL.

On January 20, 2018, Turkey started a military operation heading to Afrin in northern Syria. Turkish President Erdogan repeatedly has promised to press further east toward the SDF-controlled and U.S.-patrolled city of Manbij. Erdogan, President of Turkey since 2014, has threatened US forces with an 'Ottoman slap'.

== See also ==
- Tokhar massacre
- Turkish military intervention in Syria
- Tell Abyad offensive
- Al-Shaddadi offensive (2016)
- Northern Aleppo offensive (March–June 2016)
- Mosul offensive (2016)
- Third Battle of Fallujah
- Northern Raqqa offensive (May 2016)
- 2016 Abu Kamal offensive
- 2024 Manbij offensive
- List of wars and battles involving ISIL

== Bibliography ==
- Rashid, Bedir Mulla (2018) [1st pub. 2017]. Military and Security Structures of the Autonomous Administration in Syria. Translated by Obaida Hitto. Istanbul: Omran for Strategic Studies. Archived from the original on 1 July 2018.
