= Movement for Justice and Development in Syria =

Movement for Justice and Development in Syria حركة العدالة والبناء في سورية
- Leader: Anas al-Abdah
- Founded: 2006 (in London, United Kingdom)
- Headquarters: London, United Kingdom
- Ideology: Syrian nationalism Liberal democracy
- Political position: Centre
- People's Assembly: 1 / 210

Website
- www.forsyria.org

The Movement for Justice and Development in Syria (Arabic: حركة العدالة والبناء في سورية, romanized: Ḥarakat Al-'Idalat Wal-Bana'a fi Suriyah) is a political party and movement founded in 2006 and based in London, United Kingdom. The group describes itself as "committed to peaceful, democratic change in Syria, and the creation of a modern state which respects human rights and promotes economic and social development." Its chairman, Anas al-Abdah, has been vocal in criticizing the actions of the Ba'athist government throughout the Syrian civil war.

The group, which openly advocated for the removal of Bashar al-Assad, was banned by the Ba'athist-led regime in Syria at the time. During the Syrian civil war, the movement participated to the Syrian National Council and then to the National Coalition of Syrian Revolutionary and Opposition Forces (Syrian National Coalition).

== Leaders ==
Anas al-Abdah is currently Chairman of the Movement for Justice and Development in Syria. He was born in Damascus in 1967 and grew up there before leaving for Jordan in 1980 to study for a BSC in Geology at Yarmouk University. He moved to the UK in 1989 to continue a post-graduate degree in Geo-physics at Newcastle University. Since 1991 he has worked in IT management, and has well over ten years experience in the field.

Dr. Ibrahim Almeriy is Member of the MJD Executive Board. He was born in Idlib in 1973 and grew up in Syria before moving with his family to Jordan. He graduated in medicine from Mosul University, and established a successful practice in Amman. He was very active among the Syrian student organizations in Jordan and Iraq. He is currently training to practise in the UK.

Dr. Assem Aba Zaid is a Member of the MJD Executive Board. He was born in Dar'a in 1968, and moved to Iraq to study for a BA in economics at Mosul University. He continued his studies and obtained master's degree in Economics and PhD in Stock Markets. He taught economics in various countries and has considerable knowledge and experience of student and political activism. He has several published papers.

Mamoun Naqqar is a leading figure of the MJD Jordan Office. He was born in Hama in 1953, and served as a Syrian Air Force pilot for seven years. He has founded a highly successful drip-irrigation business in Jordan. He has remained active in Syrian politics for over 25 years.

== Connections with other opposition groups ==
The Movement for Justice and Development in Syria was co-founded by Anas al-Abdah and his brother Malik al-Abdah, the former currently chairing it. While Anas al-Abdah is also a signatory of the Syrian Observatory for Human Rights and secretary of the Damascus Declaration Support Committee in the UK, his brother Malik set up the London-based Syrian opposition satellite channel Barada TV.

Anas al-Abdah participated to the Syrian National Council, and was the president of the Syrian National Coalition from 2016 to 2017 and from 2019 to 2020.

== Controversies ==
Classified U.S. diplomatic cables, provided by the anti-secrecy Web site WikiLeaks, show that the U.S. State Department has funneled $6 million to Barada TV between 2006 and 2011 to operate the satellite channel and finance other activities inside Syria, The Washington Post reported. The State Department refused to comment on this allegation and the Movement denied that it was true.
