= Northern Raqqa offensive =

2016 military offensive

Northern Raqqa offensive (2016)
- Part of the United States intervention in Syria, the War against the Islamic State, the Rojava–Islamist conflict, and the Syrian civil war
Date	21–30 May 2016 (1 week and 2 days)
Location	Northern Raqqa Governorate, Syria 35.9500°N 39.0167°E
Result	Offensive stalled: The SDF liberates 23 villages and farms; The SDF shifts its focus to the Northern Aleppo Province; The Syrian Arab Army launches its own Raqqa offensive

Belligerents
Syrian Democratic Forces; CJTF–OIR	Islamic State

Commanders and leaders
Rojda Felat (YPJ commander) (Assyrian homeland) Nuri Mahmoud (MFS commander)	Abu Bakr al-Baghdadi (Leader of ISIL)

Units involved
Syrian Democratic Forces; People's Protection Units (YPG, the leading group); Women's Protection Units (YPJ); Liwa Thuwar al-Raqqa; Army of Revolutionaries; Northern Sun Battalion; Liwa Jund Al Haramayn; Euphrates Martyrs Battalion; Free Jarabulus Battalion; Seljuk Brigade; Kurdish Front; Al-Sanadid Forces; Syriac Military Council (MFS); Bethnahrain Women Protection Forces; United States special operations forces	(Islamic State) Military of ISIL

Strength
12,000–30,000 fighters	(Islamic State) 5,000–8,000 fighters (inside Raqqa city)

Casualties and losses
18 SDF fighters killed 1 US soldier wounded	79 killed
- 300,000 civilians displaced

The Northern Raqqa offensive was a 2016 military offensive launched by the Kurdish-led Syrian Democratic Forces against the Islamic State of Iraq and the Levant in northern Raqqa Governorate, in order to prepare for a future attack on the city of Raqqa. The offensive was launched in coordination with airstrikes by the US-led Combined Joint Task Force – Operation Inherent Resolve. After 30 May, the offensive stalled, as the SDF shifted its focus and resources to another operation in the northern Aleppo Province.

== Background ==
On 1 April 2016, Democratic Union Party (PYD) leader Salih Muslim stated that Syrian Democratic Forces (SDF) forces were preparing with the US-led coalition to launch an offensive on Raqqa.

U.S. Central Command Commander General Joseph L. Votel, the highest-ranking U.S. military official to visit Syria since the war erupted in 2011, came to Northern Syria in May 2016.

Kurdish forces established a stronghold about 37 kilometers (23 miles) north of Raqqa. ISIL reportedly used the residents of Raqqa as human shields, preventing them from leaving the city.

According to Joshua Walker of the German Marshall Fund, Raqqa could be "the beginning of the end" for ISIL, and the most important offensive since Kobani in 2015.

== Preparations ==
On 20 May the US-led coalition dropped leaflets on the city, encouraging the residents to leave.

The SDF is led and dominated by YPG forces, which generally consist of Kurds. To avoid ethnic tensions with Raqqa's majority Arab population, US special forces trained more than 200 Arab fighters to take part in the offensive.

The announcement for the offensive was made on 24 May, when the 30,000-strong SDF announced the offensive, "with participation from all SDF units", mobilising thousands of fighters in the countryside north of Raqqa, with the aim of expelling ISIL fighters from north of al-Raqqa.

The US-led coalition stated that it would provide air support for the offensive. Russian foreign minister Sergei Lavrov announced that his country was ready to coordinate with U.S. and Kurdish forces in the offensive, but the U.S., distrustful of the Russian establishment, turned down the offer.

== The offensive ==
The SDF, led by the YPG, started an offensive on 21 May 2016 against ISIL and managed to capture the village of al-Hishah, near the town of Ayn Issa. During the fighting eight ISIL fighters were killed. In the following days, additional SDF fighters were mobilized from Tell Abyad to Ayn Issa. ISIL fighters in Raqqa responded by creating defensive lines and tunnels in the city. Two days later, seven Coalition airstrikes on ISIL positions were confirmed. On 25 May, the SDF took control of the Namrodia and Matmashraja villages near Ayn Issa.

The following week, the SDF reported new gains. Their forces took control of the villages of Qartaja, al-Fastah, Indebin and Matmasraja. SDF units had advanced some 6 km into ISIL-held lands north of Raqqa, and killed at least 31 ISIL fighters. By 30 May, ISIL had redeployed 2,000 to 3,000 militants to Raqqa, from Mosul and other areas controlled by ISIL. It was also reported that ISIL's use of civilians as human shields was slowing down the SDF advance. Later on the same day, the SDF captured an additional nine villages from ISIL, in the northern countryside of Raqqa.

== Aftermath ==
On 3 June 2016, a YPG unit infiltrated into a detention center run by ISIS in Raqqa city and raided it, rescuing a number of prisoners, including a Yezidi family.

== See also ==
- Battle of Raqqa (2013)
- Manbij offensive (2016), a follow-up Kurdish offensive in the "Manbij Pocket" in the northern Aleppo Governorate, Syria
- Raqqa campaign (2016–17)
- Third Battle of Fallujah, a simultaneous Iraqi offensive against ISIL-held Fallujah, Iraq
