= Tall Hajar, Jarabulus =

Tall Hajar تل الحجر
- Village
- Location of Tall Hajar in Syria
- Coordinates: 36.61159°N 37.70912°E
- Country: Syria
- Governorate: Aleppo
- District: Jarabulus
- Subdistrict: Ghandoura

Population (2004)
  - Total: 669

Tall Hajar (Arabic: تل الحجر; Turkish: Taşlıhüyük) is a village in northern Aleppo Governorate, northern Syria. With 669 inhabitants, as per the 2004 census, Tell Hajar administratively belongs to Ghandoura Subdistrict within Jarabulus District. The village is inhabited by Turkmen.

== Notable people ==
- Abdurrahman Mustafa (born 1964), politician
