= Barada TV =

Barada TV قناة بردى الفضائية
- Country: Syria
- Headquarters: London, United Kingdom

Ownership
- Owner: Malik al-Abdah

History
- Launched: April 2009
- Closed: 2011

Links
- Website: barada.tv (dead link)

Barada TV (Arabic: قناة بردى الفضائية) was a London-based Syrian opposition satellite television network. launched by Malik al-Abdeh, the co-founder of the Movement for Justice and Development in Syria, in April 2009 It is considered one of the first Syrian channels to actively oppose the Assad Regime.

In a NPR story in 2011, the channel was described as a low-tech outlet, which is supported by videos sent from Syrian protesters and increasingly funded by donations from Syrians.

== Controversy ==
Leaked U.S. diplomatic cables show that the U.S. State Department had funneled $6 million to Barada TV between 2006 and 2011 to operate the satellite channel and finance other activities inside Syria. The State Department refused to comment on this allegation.

== See also ==
- Movement for Justice and Development in Syria
- United States involvement in regime change#2005–2009: Syria
