= Salem al-Meslet =

Syrian politician

President of the National Coalition for Syrian Revolutionary and Opposition Forces
- In office 12 July 2021 – 12 September 2023
- Prime Minister: Abdurrahman Mustafa
- Preceded by: Nasr al-Hariri
- Succeeded by: Hadi al-Bahra

Personal details
- Born: 1959 (age 66–67) Hasaka, Syria
- Party: Syrian Council of Tribes and Clans

Salem al-Meslet (Arabic: سالم المسلط, born 1959) is a Syrian politician who served as President of the National Coalition of Syrian Revolutionary and Opposition Forces from 2021 to 2023.

== Early life ==
Salem al-Meslet was born in Hasaka, Syria in 1959.

== Political history ==
On 12 July 2021, Meslet was elected as President of the National Coalition of Syrian Revolutionary and Opposition Forces and the Syrian Interim Government, replacing Nasr al-Hariri in both positions. He later lost his position as President of the National Coalition of Syrian Revolutionary and Opposition Forces with Hadi al-Bahra replacing him.
