= Rojda Felat =

Syrian Kurdish commander (born c. 1977 or 1980)

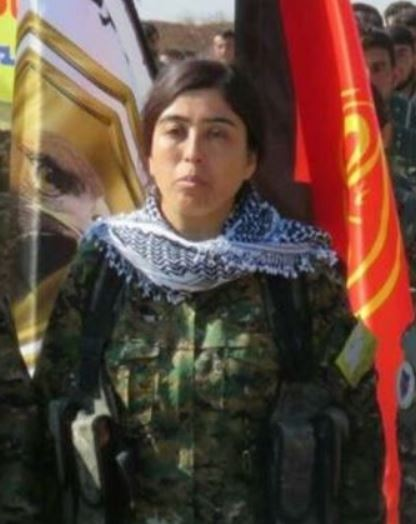
- Born: c. 1977 or 1980; Qamishli, al-Hasakah Governorate, Syria
- Military career
- Allegiance: Autonomous Administration of North and East Syria
- Branch: SDF; YPG
- Service years: 2011 (Note: According to articles by The Times and the Süddeutsche Zeitung, Felat joined the YPG/YPJ around 2013. This was contradicted by a later interview she gave The New Yorker, according to which she already joined the YPG in 2011.)–present
- Rank: Commander
- Unit: YPJ
- Conflicts: Syrian Civil War; Al-Hasakah Governorate campaign (2012–13); Siege of Kobanî (WIA); Battle for Mishtanour Hill; Eastern al-Hasakah offensive; Tell Abyad offensive; Al-Shaddadi offensive (2016); Northern Raqqa offensive (May 2016); Manbij offensive (2016); Raqqa campaign (2016–2017); Battle of Tabqa (2017); Battle of Raqqa (2017); Deir ez-Zor campaign (2017–2019)

Rojda Felat (born c. 1977 or 1980) is a Syrian Kurdish senior commander of the Women's Protection Units (YPJ) and Syrian Democratic Forces (SDF), who has fought in the Rojava conflict since it began in 2012, and has led several major campaigns against the Islamic State (IS). A revolutionary feminist, Felat's stated goal is to achieve social transformation in the Middle East through the YPJ, "liberating the Kurdish woman and the Syrian woman in general from the ties and control of traditional society, as well as liberating the entirety of Syria from terrorism and tyranny".

== Biography ==
=== Early life ===
As Rojda Felat has disclosed relatively little about her life, her biography before taking up arms is largely unknown; even her age and birthplace are disputed. Because of that, T-Online went so far as to describe her as "mysterious". According to an interview she gave The New Yorker in late 2017, Felat was born around 1977 as the child of a poor farming family near Qamishli. Various other claims regarding her origins have circulated on the Internet, however, with the Turkish news agency Jihan News and other SDF officials putting her birthdate at 1980 and/or her birthplace at al-Hasakah. Many reports by other media agencies have repeated the information of Jihan News, while others claim that Felat was born in 1962, 1966 or 1968, with one media agency even saying that she is from Batman in Turkey. This last claim was denied by a close associate of her, who told T-Online that she was definitely a Syrian Kurd.

Due to her family's poverty, Felat was only able to attend a university relatively late in her life. By 2011, she was studying Arabic literature at Hasakah University. Before the outbreak of the Syrian Civil War, Felat claims that she had intended to eventually attend the national military academy and become a Syrian Army officer. Upon the spread of the civil uprising against Bashar al-Assad in 2011, however, she decided to leave Hasakah University and return to her hometown Qamishli, where she quickly joined the Democratic Union Party's People's Protection Units (YPG).

=== Military service ===
==== Siege of Kobanî and first commands ====
With the uprising escalating into a civil war, Felat received just a few days of training before she was issued a weapon. As part of the Rojava-Islamist conflict, she went on to fight against Islamist Syrian rebel forces in the al-Hasakah Governorate campaign (2012–13). Around late 2014, however, she was in the Kobanî Canton and among the YPG/YPJ forces that ended up being besieged in the town of Kobanî by the Islamic State of Iraq and the Levant (ISIL). By this time a NCO in the Women's Protection Units (YPJ), Felat commanded a small, lightly armed squad of eleven other women during the siege.

Her unit took part in the Battle for Mishtanour Hill, where she fought alongside Arin Mirkan, who became famous for her suicide attack on an ISIL tank. Despite the bitter resistance of the YPG/YPJ, the hill eventually fell to ISIL, whereupon Felat and her squad retreated further into Kobanî. By the time the siege was broken in January 2015, Felat had been wounded by shrapnel, and five of her subordinates killed while two others were also wounded. The rest of her squad eventually returned to civilian life, and only Felat continued to be active in the military. When the YPG/YPJ launched a counter-offensive to drive ISIL from the countryside surrounding Kobanî in early 2015, Felat was first given command of 45 fighters, and then 300. From that point on, she rose to become one of the YPG/YPJ's most important commanders.

==== Operations in eastern Syria and Raqqa campaign ====
Felat took part in the capture of Tell Hamis during the eastern al-Hasakah offensive, the Tell Abyad offensive, and the Al-Shaddadi offensive. In May 2016 she led a first offensive against the de facto capital of ISIL, Raqqa, while commanding 15,000 fighters. Her forces captured 23 villages, though in the end the offensive stalled, as the SDF redeployed its fighters for the more successful Manbij offensive, in which Felat also took part. Sometime in mid 2016, an ISIL bombing at a wedding in al-Hasakah killed 22 of her family members and relatives.

In November 2016, the SDF launched another campaign to capture Raqqa, with Felat in overall charge of the operations in the northern Raqqa countryside. This time, the troops under Felat's command succeeded in capturing their objectives, whereupon the attention of the SDF shifted to the Tabqa Dam and surrounding areas. These were targeted in the course of the offensive's second phase, which commenced on 10 December and during which Felat served as leading commander for the YPJ units involved. In the subsequent phases during the campaign to capture Raqqa, Felat continued to serve as one of the most important YPJ commanders, and took part in the operations to capture the Tabqa Dam, Tabqa Airbase, and al-Thawrah city from ISIL.

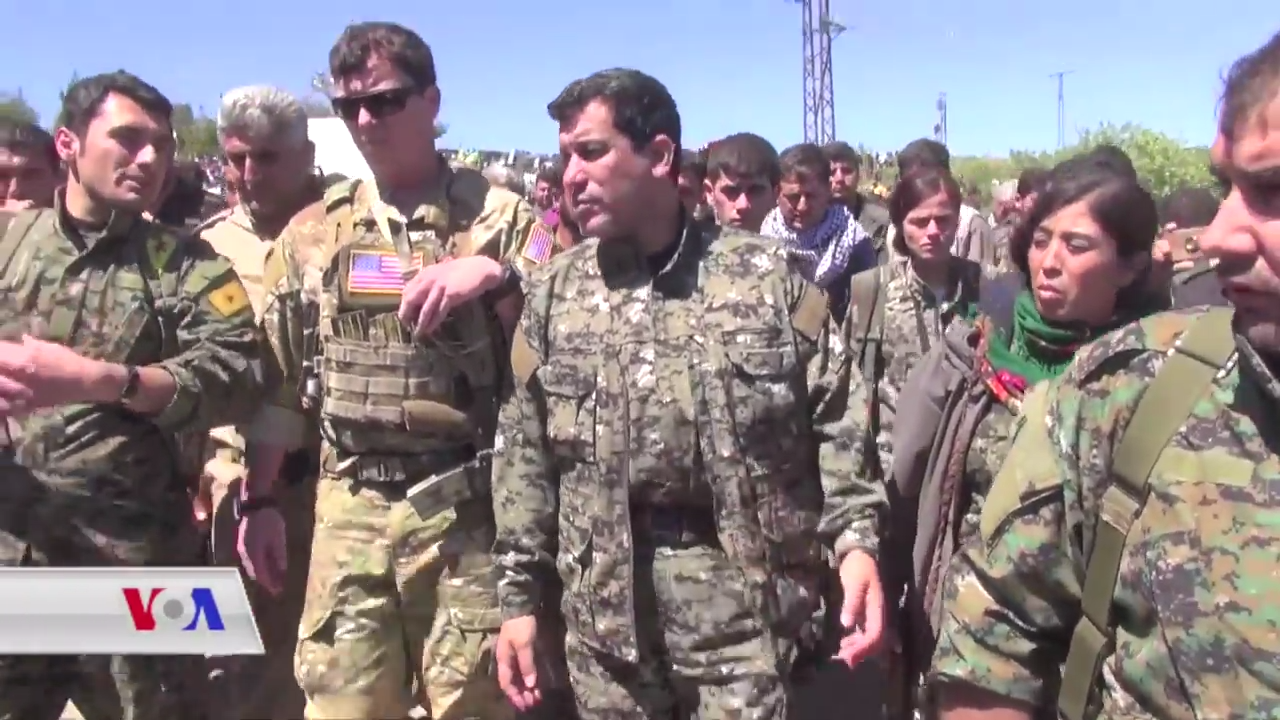
Felat (right) with YPG and US officials at the site of the April 2017 Turkish airstrikes in al-Hasakah Governorate.

On 25 April 2017, Felat visited the site of a major Turkish airstrike against the YPG near al-Malikiyah along with YPG and US officials. In October 2017, Felat commanded a contingent of SDF fighters who successfully captured Raqqa. Felat and others were pictured waving SDF flags in the former Islamic State capital city's iconic al-Naim square after SDF forces declared victory in the Battle of Raqqa. At the occasion, she noted that "her heart was jumping for joy" as the YPG/YPJ leadership had believed that the battle for the city would be "much more difficult" than it had been. By late 2018, Felat was taking part in the Deir ez-Zor campaign which aimed at defeating the last ISIL holdouts in Syria east of the Euphrates.

In early October 2019, Felat took part in a conference in Rome, declaring that the war against ISIL was continuing while stressing the importance of democratic confederalism.

== Personal life ==
Felat is a strong adherent of the YPG/YPJ. She has decided to never marry or have children, and instead intends to serve in the military for the rest of her life. A nonpracticing Muslim, she is a follower of Abdullah Öcalan's revolutionary ideology and self-identifies as radical feminist, fighting for social reforms in Syria that would improve the rights and lives of women of all ethnicities. Among her personal heroes are the Polish-German radical Communist Rosa Luxemburg, PKK leader Sakine Cansız, and the Iraqi Kurdish activist Leyla Qasim. Felat is also critical of capitalism, saying that "the capitalist system views us [women in general] as objects".

As a military leader, she is inspired by Otto von Bismarck, Napoleon, Saladin, as well as her deceased comrade Arin Mirkan. Felat has been described as talented military leader, though she herself has simply said that she is "good at strategy". In regard to the military capabilities of the female fighters under her command, Felat has commented that "Often, in military matters, people look down on women with condescension, claiming we're too delicate, that we wouldn't dare carry a knife or a gun. But you can see for yourself that in the YPJ we can operate a dushka, we know how to use mortars and we can conduct demining operations." She also praised the suicide attack of Zuluh Hemo (a.k.a. "Avesta Habur") against the Turkish Armed Forces during the Turkish military operation in Afrin, saying that her sacrifice prevented Turkish forces from "shelling children and civilians in Afrin" and urged other women to follow Hemo's example.

Felat comes from a poor farming family, and several of her relatives were victims of ISIL, further motivating her to fight against the Jihadist organization: Besides 22 of her family members who were killed in an ISIL bombing in al-Hasakah, her younger brother Mezul was killed by a roadside bomb while serving with the YPG in 2013.

== Recognition ==
She is portrayed in the documentary I am the Revolution by Benedetta Argentieri.
