= Arin Mirkan =

Kurdish combatant

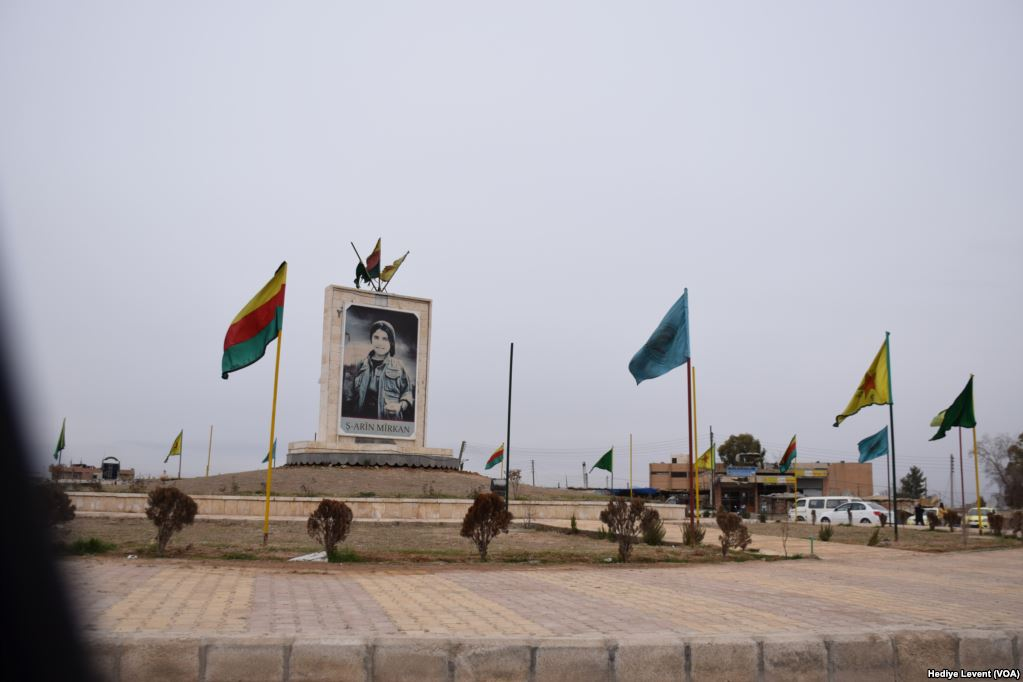
A memorial for Mirkan in Hasakah.

Arin Mirkan (Kurdish: Arîn Mîrkan; born Deilar Genj Khamis) was a Western Kurdish female fighter in the Women's Protection Units (YPJ) who died fighting against the Islamic State of Iraq and the Levant (ISIL) during the Siege of Kobanî on October 5, 2014. She fought on Mishtanour Hill with Rojda Felat, who later became the general commander of the YPJ. On the hill, Mirkan killed herself, along with numerous ISIL fighters, with explosives, to avoid being captured alive by ISIS.

Arin Mirkan was 20 (or 22) and a mother of two. Haj Mansour, the Kurdish defence official in Kobani, reported that Kurdish fighters had been forced to withdraw from a strategic hill south of Kobani. Mirkan stayed behind, attacking ISIL militants as they surrounded her. She eventually detonated explosives attached to her body. The Syrian Observatory for Human Rights (SOHR) reported that 27 ISIL fighters were thought to have died in the day's clashes, but it is unclear how many were the result of Arin's explosives, while some accounts state that she killed 10 enemy fighters.

In Kobani a statue remembering Arin Mirkan was erected. Andrew Webb-Mitchell composed a violin concerto named Arin Mirkan.
