= Abdurrahman Mustafa =

Syrian politician (born 1964)

- عبد الرحمن مصطفى
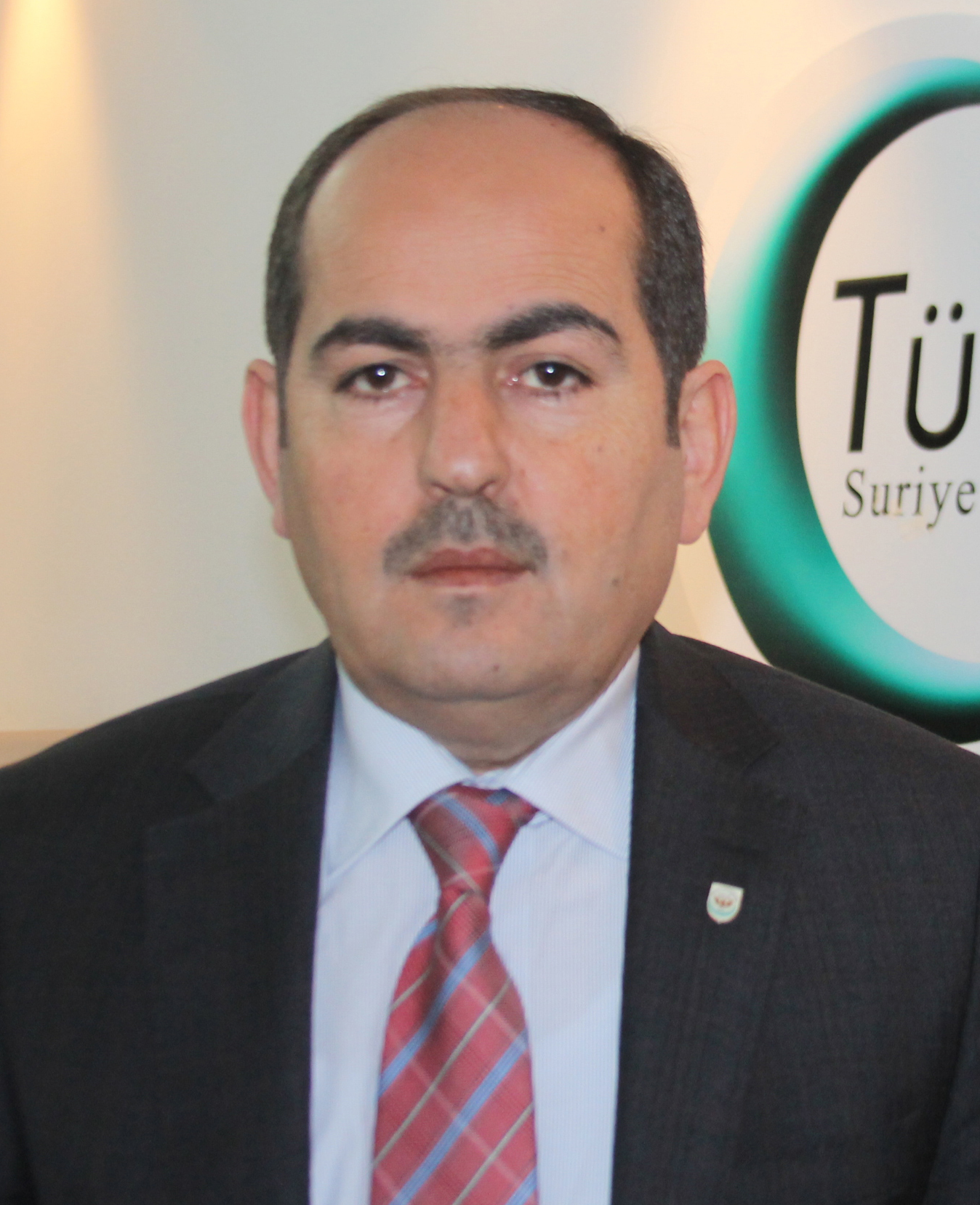
- Mustafa in 2014

Member of the People's Assembly
- Incumbent
- Assumed office 1 July 2026
- Appointed by: Ahmed al-Sharaa

President of the Syrian Turkmen Assembly
- Incumbent
- Assumed office 15 March 2026
- Preceded by: Faysal Cuma Öztürk
- In office 10 May 2014 – 4 July 2016
- Preceded by: Fayez Amro
- Succeeded by: Emin Bozoğlan

Prime Minister of the Syrian Interim Government
- In office 30 June 2019 – 30 January 2025
- President: Anas al-Abdah; Salem al-Meslet; Hadi al-Bahra
- Preceded by: Jawad Abu Hatab
- Succeeded by: Mohammed al-Bashir (as Prime Minister of Syria)

President of the Syrian National Coalition
- In office 28 February 2018 – 29 June 2019
- Prime Minister: Jawad Abu Hatab
- Preceded by: Riad Seif
- Succeeded by: Anas al-Abdah

Vice President of the Syrian Turkmen Assembly
- In office 30 March 2013 – 10 May 2014
- President: Fayez Amro
- Preceded by: Position established
- Succeeded by: Zeki Mustafa Turkmen

Personal details
- Born: 1 January 1964 (age 62) Tell Hajar, Aleppo Governorate, Syria
- Party: Independent
- Other political affiliations: Syrian National Coalition (2013–2025); Syrian Turkmen Assembly (since 2012)
- Education: University of Aleppo (BA)

Abdurrahman Mustafa (Arabic: عبد الرحمن مصطفى; born 1 January 1964) is a Syrian politician and businessman who has served as a member of the People's Assembly since 2026. He has served as president of the Syrian Turkmen Assembly since 2026, having previously held the office from 2014 to 2016.

During the Syrian civil war, Mustafa emerged as a leading figure within the Syrian opposition, holding several key positions including President of the Syrian National Coalition from 2018 to 2019, and Prime Minister of the Syrian Interim Government from 2019 until its dissolution in 2025.

== Early life and education ==
Abdurrahman Mustafa was born in 1964, in the Turkmen village of Tell Hajar (Turkish:Taşlıhüyük) in the Aleppo Governorate of Syria. Mustafa is a Sunni Muslim of Turkish origin and Syrian Turkmen ethnicity. He is married.

Mustafa studied at the School of Commerce of the University of Aleppo, where he earned a bachelor's degree in Business and Management in 1984. In addition to Arabic, he is fluent in Turkish and has knowledge of English.

== Business career ==
After graduating, Mustafa held various positions in the private sector across several countries, including Saudi Arabia, Turkey, Libya, and Bulgaria. In 1988, he was appointed Director of Finance and Administration in Libya for Kotaman A.Ş, later becoming the company's Regional Director. Between 1993 and 1996, he was involved in trade activities in Bulgaria and Turkey.

In 1996, Mustafa joined the Turkish-based Özkesoğlu Group, where he held roles such as Regional Director for Libya and later for Syria. He remained with the company until 2012, when he left the business sector to become more actively involved in politics following the outbreak of the Syrian civil war in 2011.

== Political career ==
Mustafa was among the founders of the Syrian Turkmen Platform, established on 15 December 2012 to coordinate the political activities of the Syrian Turkmen opposition. When the Syrian Turkmen Assembly was created in 2013 as the Platform's successor, he was elected to the Assembly's Executive Board and became its vice president. According to Syria Direct, Mustafa's rise within the Assembly and the broader Syrian opposition was sponsored by Turkish authorities, including then-Prime Minister Recep Tayyip Erdoğan.

On 10 May 2014, Mustafa was elected president of the Syrian Turkmen Assembly during its second Ordinary General Assembly, receiving the support of a majority of the 360 delegates. During his tenure, the Assembly officially affiliated with the Syrian Turkmen Brigades as its armed wing, declared the Syrian Turkmen flag as a national symbol, and pursued more coordinated efforts alongside the broader opposition. The Assembly also developed closer ties with Turkey and the United States in the war against the Islamic State, particularly along the Azaz–Jarabulus corridor, and was recognized by several international actors as part of the "moderate opposition."

Mustafa received support from Turkey, as well as from Gulf states such as Saudi Arabia (prior to regional policy shifts) and Qatar, and was viewed by the United States as a representative of moderate opposition factions. He led the Syrian Turkmen delegation during the 2016 Geneva III peace talks as an official component of the broader Syrian opposition.

Following the expansion of the Syrian National Coalition, the Syrian Turkmen Assembly obtained additional representation within the Coalition. In May 2017, Mustafa was elected one of its vice presidents under Riad Seif. After Seif resigned later that year for health reasons, Mustafa succeeded him as president of the Coalition following an uncontested election.According to former coalition officials, his appointment was supported by Turkey, which sought a cooperative representative for the Russian-sponsored Sochi peace talks. Mustafa's first term as president of the Syrian Turkmen Assembly concluded following the election of a new Executive Board after the Assembly's third Ordinary General Assembly in July 2016.

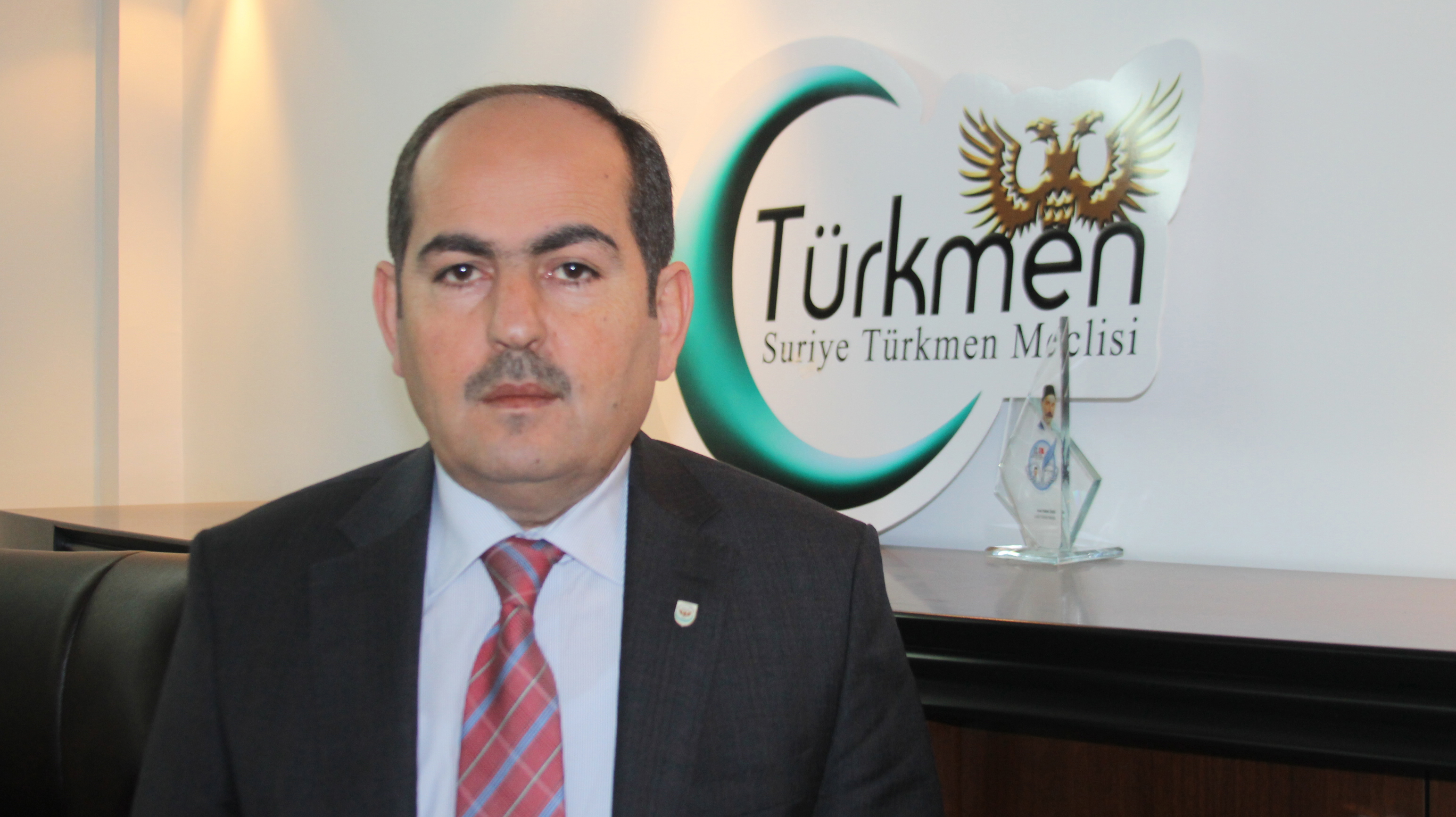
Mustafa in November 2014

In September 2019, Mustafa was appointed head of the Syrian Interim Government (SIG). His nomination reportedly followed Turkish requests for a leadership change, replacing his predecessor Jawad Abu Hatab. Reports suggest that Turkey initially considered Anas al-Abdah for the role but ultimately supported a position swap with Mustafa, whom it perceived as more aligned with its objectives. As Prime Minister, Mustafa restructured relations between the SIG and the Syrian National Coalition, refusing to resign from the SNC and prompting a change in its internal rules. He also rejected subordinating the SIG to the SNC and was instrumental in facilitating Hadi al-Bahra’s return as SNC president. Analysts have noted that Mustafa played a central role in aligning the SNC more closely with Turkish strategic interests.

Following the fall of the Assad regime, Mustafa announced on 30 January 2025 that the Syrian Interim Government would place itself at the disposal of the Syrian caretaker government. On 19 March 2025, he met with President Ahmed al-Sharaa in Damascus to discuss the country's political transition. In March 2026, he was re-elected president of the Syrian Turkmen Assembly at its seventh Ordinary General Assembly.
