= Khaled Khoja =

Syrian physician and politician (born 1965)

Khaled Khoja خالد خوجة (in Arabic) Halit Hoca (in Turkish)
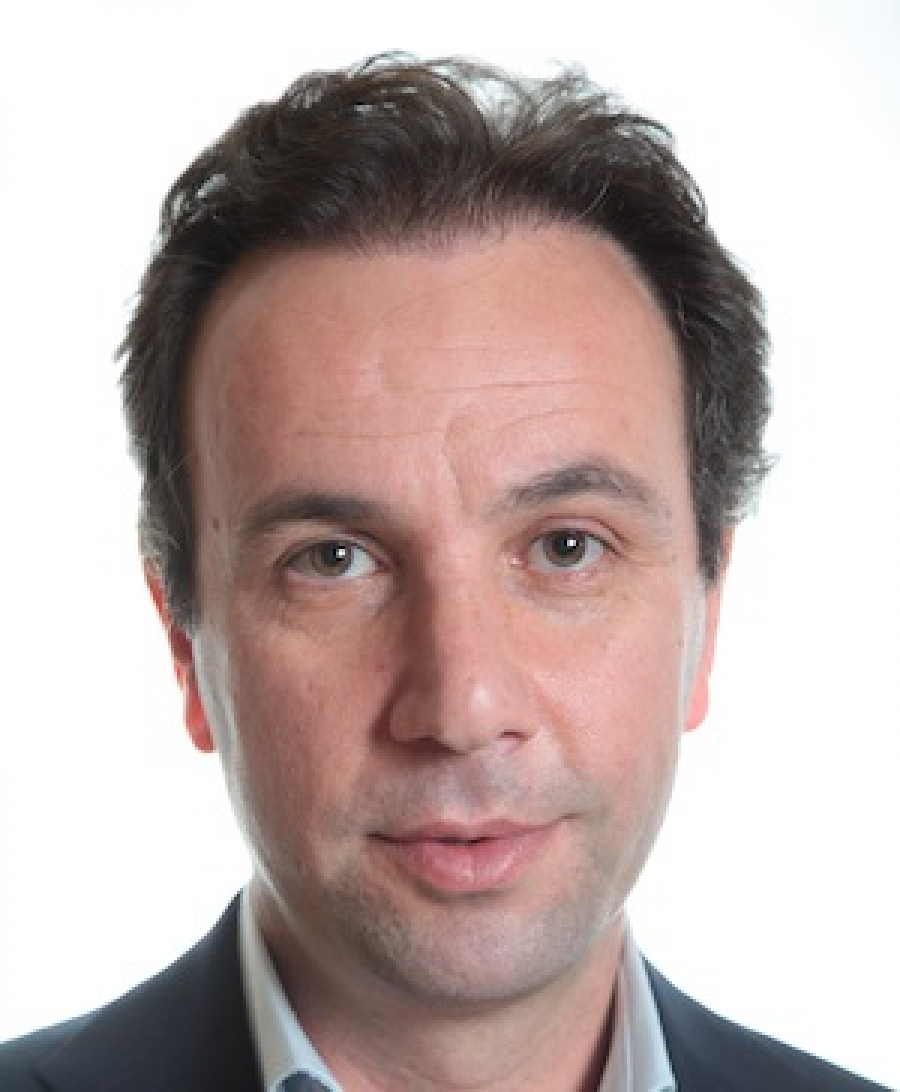
- Khoja in 2012

President of the Syrian National Coalition
- In office 4 January 2015 – 5 March 2016
- Prime Minister: Ahmad Tu'mah
- Vice President: Hisham Ibrahim Marwah
- Preceded by: Hadi al-Bahra
- Succeeded by: Anas al-Abdah

Personal details
- Born: 4 July 1965 (age 61) Damascus, Syria
- Party: Independent; Future Party (2019-)
- Other political affiliations: Syrian National Coalition (2012–2018)
- Education: İzmir University (MBBS)

Khaled Khoja (Arabic: خالد خوجة, Turkish: Halid Hoca, born 4 July 1965) is a Syrian-Turkish physician and politician who served as President of the Syrian National Coalition from 2015 to 2016.

Khoja was born in Damascus, Syria, into a Syrian Turkmen family of Turkish origin. He completed his secondary education in Ubari, Libya. During the rule of President Hafez al-Assad, he was detained twice for his political activities.

Between 1985 and 1987, Khoja studied political science at Istanbul University. He subsequently studied medicine at the İzmir University, graduating as a physician in 1995. He became a Turkish citizen in 1993 and later legally adopted the name Alptekin Hocaoğlu. He is fluent in both Arabic and Turkish.

Following the outbreak of the Syrian civil war in 2011, Khoja became active in the Syrian opposition. He participated in the founding of the Syrian National Council in October 2011 and later served as the Syrian National Coalition's representative in Turkey.

In January 2015, Khoja was elected President of the Syrian National Coalition, succeeding Hadi al-Bahra. During his tenure, he represented the coalition in international diplomatic efforts concerning the Syrian conflict, including negotiations aimed at ending the civil war. He served until March 2016, when he was succeeded by Anas al-Abdah.

Khoja resigned from the Syrian National Coalition on 25 April 2018. In 2019, he became one of the founding members of the Future Party, established by former Turkish prime minister Ahmet Davutoğlu.

Political offices
Preceded by Hadi al-Bahra	President of the Syrian Opposition; 2015–2016	Succeeded by Anas al-Abdah
