= Anas al-Abdah =

Syrian geologist and politician (born 1967)

- أنس العبدة

Member of the People's Assembly
- Incumbent
- Assumed office 12 July 2026
- Appointed by: Ahmed al-Sharaa

President of the Syrian Negotiation Commission
- In office 13 June 2020 – 13 June 2022
- Preceded by: Nasr al-Hariri
- Succeeded by: Bader Jamous

President of the Syrian National Coalition
- In office 29 June 2019 – 12 July 2020
- Prime Minister: Abdurrahman Mustafa
- Preceded by: Abdurrahman Mustafa
- Succeeded by: Nasr al-Hariri
- In office 5 March 2016 – 6 May 2017
- Prime Minister: Ahmad Tu'mah
- Preceded by: Khaled Khoja
- Succeeded by: Riad Seif

Secretary-General of the Syrian National Coalition
- In office 12 July 2014 – 4 January 2015
- President: Hadi al-Bahra
- Preceded by: Bader Jamous
- Succeeded by: Yahya Maktabi

Leader of the Movement for Justice and Development
- Incumbent
- Assumed office 11 May 2006
- Preceded by: Party established

Personal details
- Born: Anas Muhammad al-Abda; 1967 (age 58–59) Damascus, Syria
- Party: Movement for Justice and Development (since 2006)
- Other political affiliations: Syrian National Coalition (2012–2025)
- Education: Yarmouk University (BSc); Newcastle University (MSc)
- Occupation: Geologist; geophysicist; politician

Anas Muhammad al-Abda (Arabic: أنس العبدة, born 1967) is a Syrian geologist and politician who has served as a member of the People's Assembly since 2026. The leader of the Movement for Justice and Development, he previously served as president of the Syrian Negotiation Commission from 2020 to 2022. He also served as President of the Syrian National Coalition from 2016 to 2017 and from 2019 to 2020.

== Early life ==
Anas al-Abdah was born in Damascus. He studied geology in the Yarmouk University in Jordan and received a master's degree on geophysics at the Newcastle University in England.

== Political history ==
On 11 May 2006, Anas al-Abdah and other Syrian opposition activists founded the Movement for Justice and Development in Syria in London. In the same year, he joined the Damascus Declaration and became one of its representatives abroad.

=== Ba'athist Syria ===
==== Syrian civil war ====
After the breakout of the Syrian civil war in 2011, he co-founded the Syrian National Council and was elected as the council's secretariat. The council later joined the National Coalition for Syrian Revolutionary and Opposition Forces. al-Abdah later became a part of the SNC's delegate at the Geneva II Conference on Syria.

On 5 March 2016, Anas al-Abdah was elected as the president of the National Coalition, succeeding Khaled Khoja.

On 9 November 2016, the National Coalition under al-Abdah sent congratulations to Donald Trump after the latter was elected as the president of the United States. He also called on Frank-Walter Steinmeier to impose economic sanctions on Russia.

On 5 December 2016, Anas al-Abdah, spoke in a press conference in Erbil, Iraqi Kurdistan, that the Rojava Peshmerga forces based in Iraqi Kurdistan would be a stabilizing factor if they moved to Syria and supported the Free Syrian Army factions backed by the SNC. He said that the offensive the YPG-led Syrian Democratic Forces (SDF) launched last month to retake the city of Raqqa, will lead to sectarian conflicts in the future as YPG and allied groups such as FSA groups are not qualified militarily and civically for retaking Raqqa, only FSA groups supported by the SNC are the qualified force to retake Raqqa.

He resigned from his post on 6 May 2017 and was replaced by Riad Seif.

On 29 June 2019, he was elected again as President of the Syrian National Coalition, replacing Abdurrahman Mustafa, whom he appointed the following day as Prime Minister of the Syrian Interim Government (SIG). According to a Syria Direct report, al-Abdah had been considered as Prime Minister of the SIG, but the SNC's Turkish backers eventually decided to switch their positions so al-Abdah would become president of the SNC while Mustafa headed the SIG.

In January 2021, al-Abdah urged the acceleration of the Syrian political process, citing worsening economic and security conditions. He called for full implementation of United Nations Security Council Resolution 2254 and the Geneva Declaration, emphasized the importance of addressing the issue of detainees, and pressed for a more effective United Nations plan to avoid previous negotiation deadlocks.

=== Post-Ba'athist Syria ===
==== Member of the People's Assembly ====
On 12 July 2026, al-Abdah was appointed as a member of the People's Assembly by Ahmed al-Sharaa.
