= Corrective Movement (Syria) =

1970–2000 reformist program by Hafez al-Assad

- Part of Presidency of Hafez al-Assad
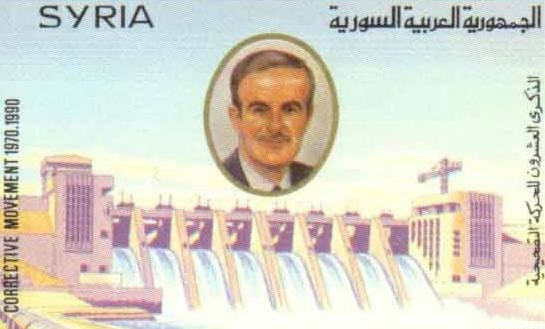
- Postage stamp commemorating the 20th anniversary of the start of the Corrective Movement, 1990. It depicts Syrian President and Ba'ath Party leader Hafez al-Assad and the Tabqa Dam on the Euphrates River, which was completed during his presidency
- Date: November 16, 1970 – June 10, 2000
- Location: Ba'athist Syria
- Cause: Economic decline after the rule of Salah Jadid; Military weakness; Political instability; Isolation from other countries
- Motive: Modernization of the economy, medicine and education; Consolidation of power; Creation of a powerful army; Strengthening ties with the Soviet Union; Return of the Golan Heights
- Outcome: Inconclusive: Infrastructure expanded; Medicine and education improved; Strengthening state institutions; Austerity policy in mid-1980s; The emergence of the "New Class"; Infiraj and Ta'addudiyya policies; Assadization of Syria; formation of the Assad's personality cult; Militarization of the state and society; Socialist reforms have been finally ended by Bashar al-Assad

The Corrective Movement (Arabic: الحركة التصحيحية, romanized: al-Ḥarakah at-Taṣḥīḥīyya) was the political, social and economic program, launched by Hafez al-Assad, soon after his seizure of power in the 1970 Ba'athist coup d'etat in Syria. Assad later compared the Corrective Movement program to Mikhail Gorbachev's future perestroika program. The main policies of the program included a shift away from radicalism in the Ba'athist project of socialist transformation of society, expansion of mass recruitment into the Ba'ath Party, and a limited degree of economic and political liberalization.

The Corrective Movement program was the new government's reaction to the results of the extremely radical and aggressive policies of its predecessor, Salah Jadid, and was marked by a number of political and economic relaxations and changes (especially in the first decade). Reforms eventually succeeded in eradicating some of the far-left policies of the radical Ba'athists who preceded him and improved relations with the Sunni Arab merchant class. Program also led to the huge militarization of Syria and constitutional centralization of power in president's hands.

When the communist regimes in the Eastern Bloc collapsed, an ideological crisis within the government arose. However, Assad and his supporters hit back, stating that because of the "Corrective Movement under the leadership of the warrior Hafez al-Assad", the principles of economic and political pluralism, which had been introduced "some two decades" beforehand, safeguarded the Syrian government from the possibility of collapse.

However, as a result of the program, Syria also faced a number of economic and political problems, such as shortages of goods and austerity policy in the 1980s, as well as the formation of a totalitarian Assadist dictatorship and the gradual isolation of Syria from the entire region.

== Background ==
=== Salah Jadid ===
Since 1966, Syria has been effectively ruled by General Salah Jadid. Jadid, who held radical pro-Marxist views, became the first major ideologist of neo-Ba'athism. The rule of Jadid's Marxist-Leninist regime was characterized by brutal repressions, the harsh imposition of atheism and far-left reforms. Jadid's swift and harsh imposition of such radical measures was extremely unpopular inside the country.

==== Repressions ====
Almost immediately after coming to power, Jadid reorganized all state intelligence agencies, centralizing their activities and management under the National Security Bureau, which gained a sad reputation for its brutal methods of torture and imprisonment of political prisoners.

==== Radical socialism ====
The Jadid regime adopted a Marxist program of rapid economic development. Jadid and his supporters prioritised socialism and the "internal revolution", promoted the idea of class struggle and attempted a socialist transformation of Syrian society at a forced pace, creating unrest and economic difficulties. As the state assumed greater control over economic decision-making by adopting centralized planning and strictly regulating commercial transactions, Syria experienced a substantial loss of skilled workers, administrators, and their capital. The properties of traders, local businessmen and land owners were confiscated by Jadid's radical leftist regime, while the Syrian military forces became thoroughly politicized with neo-Ba'athist officers.

==== Atheism ====
Jadid's ideologues openly denounced religion as a source of what they considered the "backwardness" of the Arabs. The new regime decreed that religious schools were to be closed, religious institutions nationalized, the powers of religious leaders curtailed, and religious provisions removed from the constitution, among other anti-religious measures. The Jadid regime was very anti-religious and imposed severe restrictions on religious freedom, banning religious preaching and persecuting the clergy. Neo-Ba'athists viewed the religious clerics as class enemies to be liquidated by the Ba'athist state. The party disseminated the doctrine of the "Arab Socialist New Man", which conceptualised the "New Arab Man" as an atheist who campaigned for socialist revolution and rejected religion, feudalism, imperialism, capitalism, and every value of the old social order.

== Assad takeover and adoption of a new policy ==
=== Coup d'etat ===
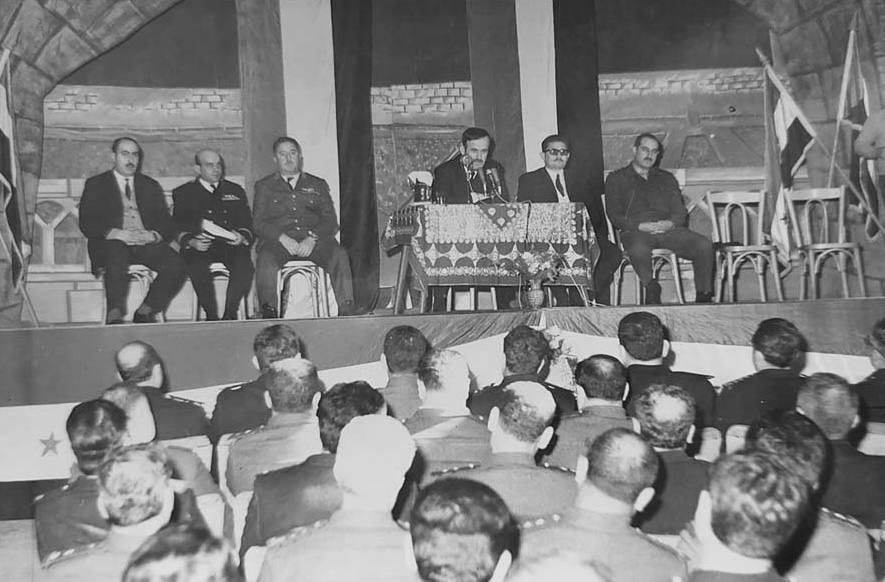
Hafez al-Assad addresses army officers in the city of Latakia, 1971

In 1970, a coup d'état took place in Syria that overthrew the Jadid regime and brought Hafez al-Assad to power. Assad named his coup the same name he later gave to his reform program (the "Corrective Movement"). This military coup was presented to everyone as a "correction of intra-party politics" and not as a seizure of power using the army. Assad announced adoption of the new policy on November 16. The first declared goals was Syria's cooperation with "progressive" governments of the Arab world and all forces fighting the Zionists.

=== November 16 Communiqué ===
The communiqué of November 16, 1970, criticized Assad's Ba'athist predecessors, and especially the Jadid regime, for their authoritarian and anti-popular rule, oppression of the masses, and widening gaps between the people and the party. The communiqué declared Syria's need to change its economic, political, and social course. Regarding foreign policy, the communiqué stated that the government would strengthen relations with Arab progressive and reformist governments, while developing relations with socialist and Third World countries.

For domestic policy, communiqué proposed the following actions as main (copied from "Social change and politics in modern Syria" by Yoshihiro Kimura):

1) To mobilize all progressive people's forces to participate in the struggle;

2) To establish a parliament for the people within 3 months which will be composed of representatives of parties, people’s organizations, craft unions, trade unions, and other progressive organizations;

3) to develop socialist transformation in order to lay the material foundation of socialist Arab society;

4) to promulgate domestic administrative law, etc.

Assad stated that he intended to move away from the authoritarian approach by reorganizing the ruling party, popular organizations, and introducing pluralism in accordance with democratic principles, "correcting" the state's course. This is where the name of the reformist program comes from.

=== 5th Regional Congress ===
The 5th Regional Congress of the party was held from 8 to 13 May 1971. Almost the entire congress was devoted to discussing the difficult legacy of Jadid's far-left regime and how to address it. Most of those attending the congress believed that Jadid and his associates had deviated from the true ideas of Ba'athism. Issues of centralization of power, popular democracy, and relations between the party and the people were also addressed. Based on the unfortunate experience of Jadid's anti-popular rule, the congress agreed on the goal of creating a new legal framework, national administrative law, and the importance of popular organizations.

At the same congress, within the framework of the adoption of the policy of "Ta'addudiyya" (political pluralism), the question of creating a coalition of left-wing parties was raised (which was later actually created under the name of the National Progressive Front).

=== 11th National Congress ===
The 11th National Congress was held from August 23 to 29, 1971. The congress reaffirmed the need for party unity at the national level (both organizationally and ideologically), as well as for achieving pan-Arab solidarity for the sake of victory in the Arab struggle against Israel. According to the congress, "strengthening the strategy of socialist and unification struggle and liberating the occupied territories of Israel must be set as the basic goal of Arab policy."

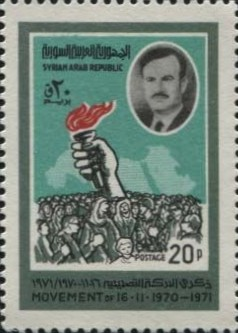
Postage stamp on the first anniversary of Corrective Movement, 1971

At the National Congress, Assad assured party members that his leadership was a radical change from that of Jadid, and he would implement a "corrective movement" to return Syria to the true "nationalist socialist line". Unlike Jadid, Assad emphasised "the advancement of which all resources and manpower would be mobilized was to be the liberation of the occupied territories". This would mark a major break with his predecessors and would, according to Raymond Hinnebusch, dictate "major alterations in the course of the Ba'athist state". Assad called his domestic reforms a "Corrective Movement", and it achieved some results. Some of the main goals of the Corrective Movement were to restore the trust of the people and external potential sponsors in the government and to revive the economy, which had suffered serious hardships after the aggressive and unpopular policies of Salah Jadid. Soon a new National Command of the party was elected, consisting, in addition to the Secretary General, of 5 Syrians, 6 Iraqis, 3 Palestinians, 1 Lebanese and 1 Jordanian.

=== Anti-Jadid purges ===
In the first few years, Assad carried out numerous purges and repressions against suspected and proven supporters of Salah Jadid, arresting them on charges of sabotaging the government. In 1971, one of the deposed leader's relatives, Izzat Jadid, was arrested; in June, numerous people were arrested on charges of supporting the deposed regime; in December 1972, a new wave of arrests and detentions took place on the same charges.

== Economic reforms ==
The Corrective Movement program did not abandon the use of the five-year plan system. Assad proved to be more pragmatic in his policies than Jadid - therefore the reforms of his Corrective Movement program were characterized by initial economic relief from radical oppression: the Assad government immediately abandoned Jadid's radical and unpopular Marxist program of development (However, Assad continued to follow the socialist Ba'athist path - the economy remained centralized and largely controlled by the government). As stated, the Corrective Movement continued the purpose of the March 8 Revolution, but slightly changed the priorities in their achievement, which was formulated in the new constitution of the 1973 model. Assad created the Higher Economic Council, a group of technocrats that helped him centralize economic governance throughout the 1970s.

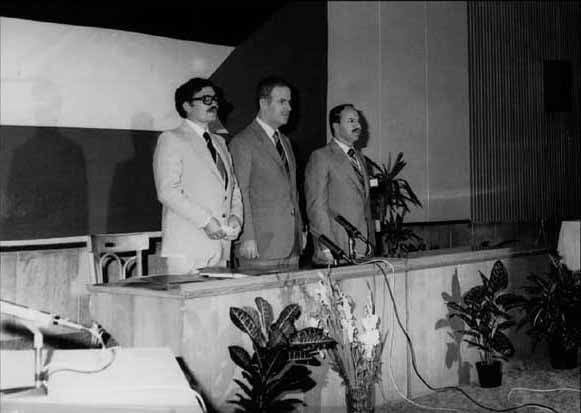
Syrian Ba'ath Party meeting, 1980s

Under the Corrective Movement program, the government has allocated significant resources to improve the lives of citizens: all Syrians were given access to subsidized food, free education, and state-funded healthcare. Assad cut prices for basic foodstuffs 15 percent, which won him support from ordinary citizens. The confiscation of goods under Jadid was reversed, restrictions on travel to and trade with Lebanon were eased, and Assad encouraged growth in the private sector. Encouraging the private sector in the economy played into Assad's hands after the Yom Kippur War in 1973, the oil embargo (and the rise in oil prices) and the influx of Arab capital. Moreover, higher prices for agricultural exports, as well as the state's limited economic liberalization policy, encouraged growth. By the end of the decade, the Syrian economy had shifted from its traditional agrarian base to an economy dominated by the service, industrial, and commercial sectors. Local production of majority of consumer goods has increased in 1970s (however, production of items such as refrigerators or paints has stagnated and even fallen down). The state continued to play a role in regulating prices for basic goods and in employing citizens - according to official figures, by 1991 the unemployment rate was only about 6 percent. In the 1990s, the government launched a major campaign of economic relaxation known as Al-Ta`addudiyya Al-Iqtisadiyya.

=== Liberalization of economy ===
In official language, the process of economic and political pluralism in Syria has come to be called "Ta'addudiyya" (literally "pluralism" in Arabic), but for the term economic liberalization there was another term - infiraj. The chief architect of the infiraj was technocrat Muhammad al-Imadi, the Minister of Economy and Foreign Trade.

In December 1970, Assad told wealthy Damascus merchants that he would do everything to protect the interests of the private sector. The Corrective Movement program recognized the importance of foreign investment, so it made important decisions to attract and protect it: for example, the confiscation of foreign capital was completely prohibited, and investors themselves were given the right to take half of their investments out of Syria, or to withdraw the entire amount invested in a particular project, within the first six months if the project encountered difficulties. The government also simplified the process of concluding trade contracts and agreements. In 1972, it relaxed import controls to combat shortages of some basic commodities such as sugar, flour and rice. In 1974, the concept of an "open-door economy" was finally formulated and adopted, after which a new series of laws were introduced—for example, controls on the circulation of hard currency were lifted, previously frozen assets were unblocked, and foreign investors received more benefits.

In 1971, the government established the Free Zone General Commission: its duties included the management, operation and control of the "free zones", that is, zones where customs regulations do not apply and through which goods and services move without any restrictions: by 1975, the area of these free zones throughout Syria had increased many times over. A potential investor was given the right to lease such zones in which to carry out his activities: goods produced there began to be exported duty-free. In 1978, 40 companies received permission to implement their projects in these zones: that same year, French companies received a number of contracts worth a total of $117 million, while Italian companies received $150 million. In 1971, the private sector financed 1,178 projects totalling £74 million. However, by 1980, 75 percent of all investment in industry still came from the public sector: the overwhelming percentage of total investment was allocated to the public sector (for example, 79 percent under the Third Five-Year Plan in 1971-1975). The new outflow of foreign capital occurred with the start of the Syrian intervention in the Lebanese Civil War in 1976.

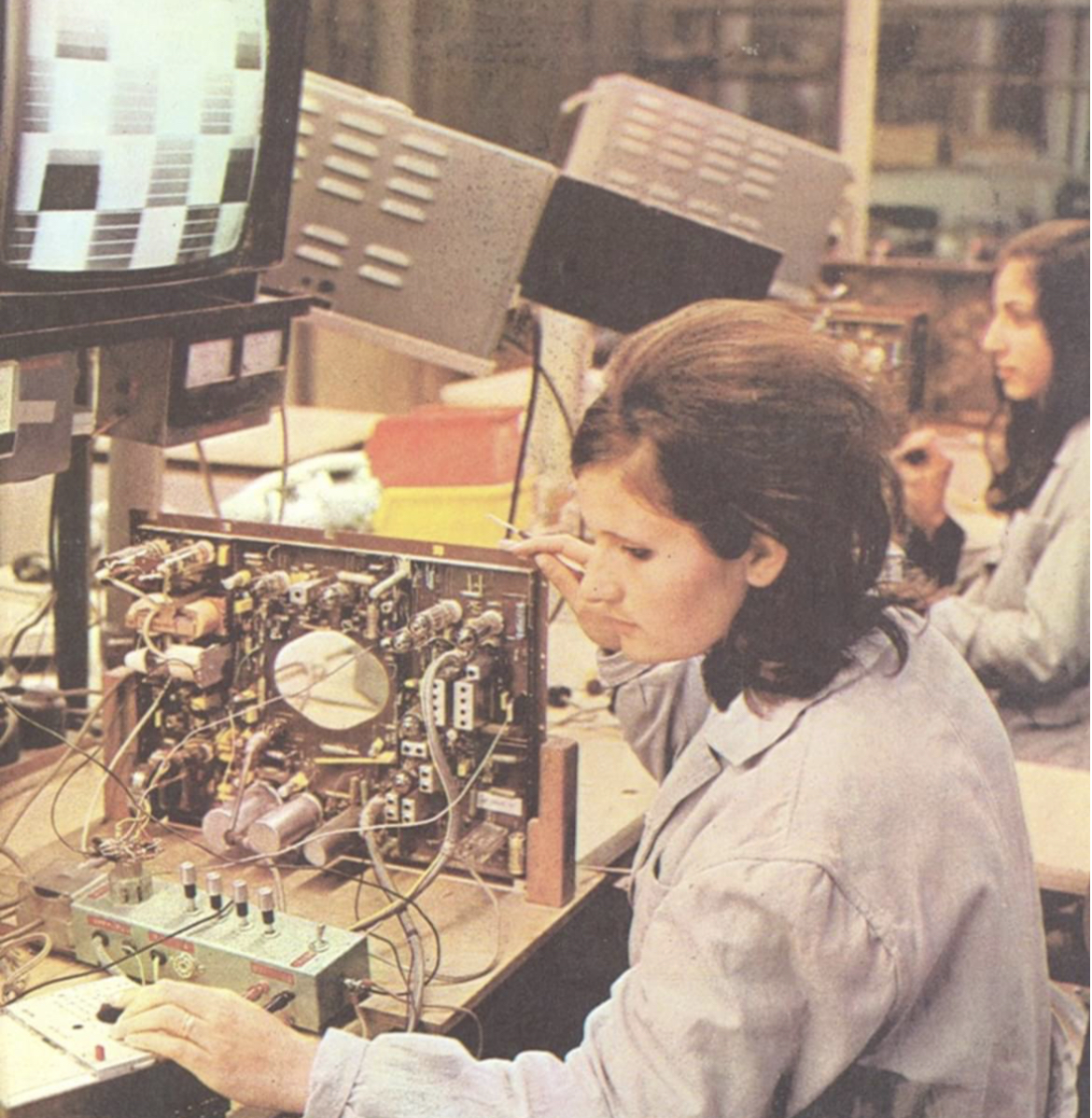
Assembling televisions at the factory of the Syrian Arab Electronics Industry Company, 1973

By the mid-1970s, Assad, as part of the Corrective Movement, had introduced further market reforms, passing a series of laws on the formation of companies in the tourism and transport sectors to further stimulate the private sector. By 1976, The New York Times Magazine noted the impressive successes of the Corrective Movement reforms: thus, Syria's imports had increased by 332 percent (to 4,571 million Syrian pounds) and exports by 376 percent (to 2,914 million Syrian pounds) by 1974 compared with 1970. In March 1979, the rigid and nationalized banking system was relaxed, leading to the creation of a joint Syrian-Jordanian bank. However, the economic liberalization policy failed to prevent the growing crisis in Syria, which resulted in austerity policies in the mid-1980s amid the growth of the black market, inflation (inflation rate jumped to almost 60 percent), and the fall of the Syrian pound. Syrian citizens have already faced shortages of some goods and long queues, but now this has become even more so. During the austerity period, there were more shortages of goods and even regular power cuts in major cities (including Damascus) occurred. The government also responded with new reforms, such as the creation of a number of mixed-sector companies in agribusiness and the adoption of a new law that granted many privileges to expatriates; and some slowing down of the militarization process. Along with the economy, the debt to external creditors also grew - if in 1980 it amounted to a little more than 3.5 billion US dollars, then by 1994 this figure had grown to 20.5 billion US dollars.

The closer the collapse of the Soviet Union, the main ally of the Hafez al-Assad regime, came, the more the government moved towards economic liberalization and rapprochement with Western European countries, even with the United States. in April 1985, the Deputy Prime Minister for Economic Affairs, Salim Yasin, announced a campaign to attract higher levels of foreign investment. In 1991, Law No. 10 was passed, which finally opened the public sector to private investment and provided eligible investors with even more privileges, such as tax breaks. Under this law, by 1998 the government had approved 1,494 projects with a total cost of $366 billion (however, the government later admitted that most of them had failed). However, laws that contradicted this were often introduced: for example, Law No. 24 officially punished the private currency sector, although it was applied very rarely. In 1992, economic growth was 10.2 percent, although by 1994-1995 it had fallen to only 6.7 percent and again to 2.2 percent in 1996. The government also relaxed import restrictions, which led to an increase in imports - while in 1989 the sum of all Syrian imports was $2 billion, by 1993 it had grown to more than $4.5 billion.

=== Agricultural sector ===
In the early years, the Syrian economy was heavily dependent on agriculture (but its importance gradually declined over time), so the Corrective Movement program increased state funding for the agricultural sector many times over: in the Third Five-Year Plan (1971-1975), the state invested 890 million Syrian pounds in it, which is 654 percent more than in the Second Five-Year Plan (1965-1970), in which investments amounted to only 135 million Syrian pounds. The government also raised prices for agricultural products to motivate farmers not to move to the city and supported farmers by encouraging them to use fertilizers, which increased threefold in quantity (from 40,000 used tons in 1970 to 126,000 in 1975). Tractor production was also increased to further stimulate farming, with a target of producing 6,000 tractors annually. By the 1990s, the rural sector's share of the economy had declined to 26 percent.

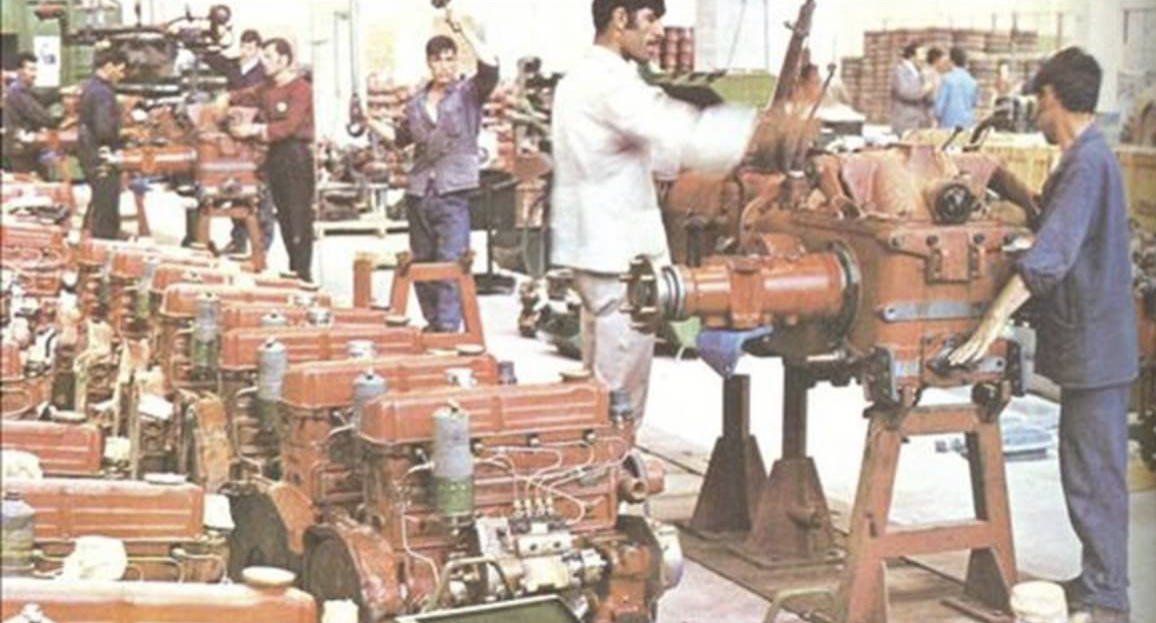
Workers assemble engines at a tractor factory, 1974

On May 11, 1971, the government adopted the Legislative Decree No. 15, also known as the Law on Local Self -Government - its main goal is to concentrate responsibility for the land in the hands of the workers and granting them the possibilities of management. The Ministry of Local Administration, created on August 12, 1971, is responsible for compliance with Legislative Decree No. 15 as well as the planning of regional development programs.

On November 9, 1975, Law No. 14 was adopted, forming the Supreme Agricultural Council (SAC). The SAC is responsible for establishing the scale of the production of specific agricultural products, the establishment of prices for these products, establishing prices for resources for farmers (such as fertilizers), lending to rural lending policy, adulthood of marketing policy and ensuring coordination of all these policies as well as organizations below. The organization includes Prime Minister, Chairman, Deputy Prime Minister for Economic Affaires, Ba'ath Party's Senior Representative for Peasant Affairs, Executive Director of the Peasants Union, and the minists of agriculture and agrarian Reform, Planning, Foreign Trade, Economy, Industry, Supply and Home Trade.

In the mid-1980s, the government adopted a series of measures to revive and improve the rural sector of the economy: for example, the 1985 investment budget provided for a sharp increase in public investment in agriculture. Following the Eighth Regional Congress in 1985, investments were increased to improve agricultural technology and further expand public services in rural areas, which subsequently led to a new growth in a number of agricultural crops such as cotton and beets.

=== Infrastructure ===
Massive expenditures for development of irrigation, electricity, water, road building projects, irisin plants and expansion of health services and education to rural areas contributed to prosperity. Hafez al-Assad invested heavily in infrastructure such as electricity, water, and transportation. For example, in 1992, 36 billion Syrian pounds was spent on upgrading and expanding infrastructure, and in 1993, the government spent more than 60 billion Syrian pounds on the same, which was more than 50 percent of the country's annual budget. Likewise, a number of new power plants were built to meet the increased demand for electricity. From 1992 to 1993, the investment budget for infrastructure development is also increased, and increased by 230 percent, from 4 billion Syrian pounds in 1992 to more than 13.5 billion in 1993. Investment in telephone services also paid off: the number of telephone subscribers in the country increased from 500,000 in 1992 to 3 million by 1999.

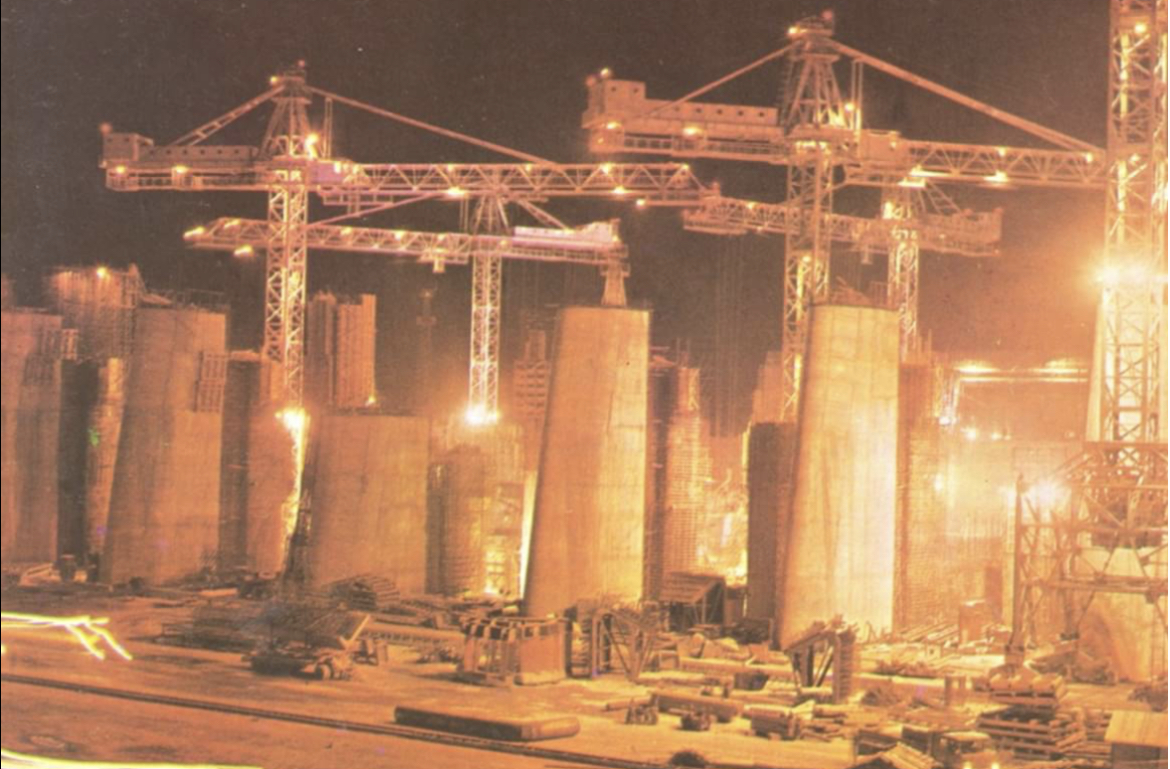
Construction of a power plant and dam on the Euphrates, 1972

One of the significant successes of the Corrective Movement was the completion of the Euphrates Dam with the support of the USSR. The dam was constructed during the agricultural reform policies of Hafez al-Assad, who had re-routed the Euphrates river for the dam in 1974. The total cost of the dam was US$340 million of which US$100 million was in the form of a loan by the Soviet Union. The Soviet Union also provided technical expertise. During construction, up to 12,000 Syrians and 900 Russian technicians worked on the dam. Dam was completed in 1973, while the accompanying power station was finished on 8 March 1978, on the anniversary of 1963 Ba'athist revolution. Syria's private sector invested around £1.5 billion annually in property and infrastructure, but very little in industry - only £70 million.

=== The emergence of the "New Class" ===
Many bourgeois families, ruined by Jadid, were given a second chance to prosper after Assad came to power. The liberalization (albeit partial) of the economy intensified over time, and by the early 1990s a new socio-political class of the bourgeoisie had finally formed in Syria, which became known as the "New Class" (al-Tabaqa al-Jadida). The New Class was heavily dependent on the survival of the market economic system in Syria and had close ties with the Assad government and Syrian elite. As a result of the Corrective Movement, the New Class grown quite quickly and parasitized in the Syrian economy (for example, because of expansion of the state and public investments). It did not exceed 1 percent of the population, but have high level of power in Syria, especially in 1990s. The New Class received especially strong power in the 2000s with the advent of Bashar al-Assad and the beginning of his intensive market reforms.

== Political reforms ==
=== Domestic policy ===
The Assad's inner circle and the most powerful political elite in the country, formed around him was called the "al-Jama'a" ("Company"). It was this group of people who were the most important of all those who influenced the president's decisions. The al-Jama'a main tasks were to assist Assad in defending the regime from his opponents; to assist in the effective governance of Syria; and to advise Assad on the most important domestic and foreign policy issues. Conflicts persisted within the al-Jama'a, but it was entirely loyal to Hafez al-Assad personally. Elite army unit commanders (for example, those responsible for guarding the presidential palace or media stations) occupied a special place within the al-Jama'a. The most prominent were the Special Forces and (until 1984) the Defense Companies.

One of his changes to the country's domestic policy was the centralization of power in the hands of the president, who began to wield greater authority than even the leader of the Ba'ath Party's regional command. The new constitution of 1973 only strengthened this order of things. The degree of centralization of power around Assad was clearly demonstrated by the verbal praise of public authorities, and the final (and decisive) word on personnel changes or policy now always rested with Assad - although in the area of public policy-making, the Ba'ath Party still played a role, since Assad often consulted with its members on this matter.

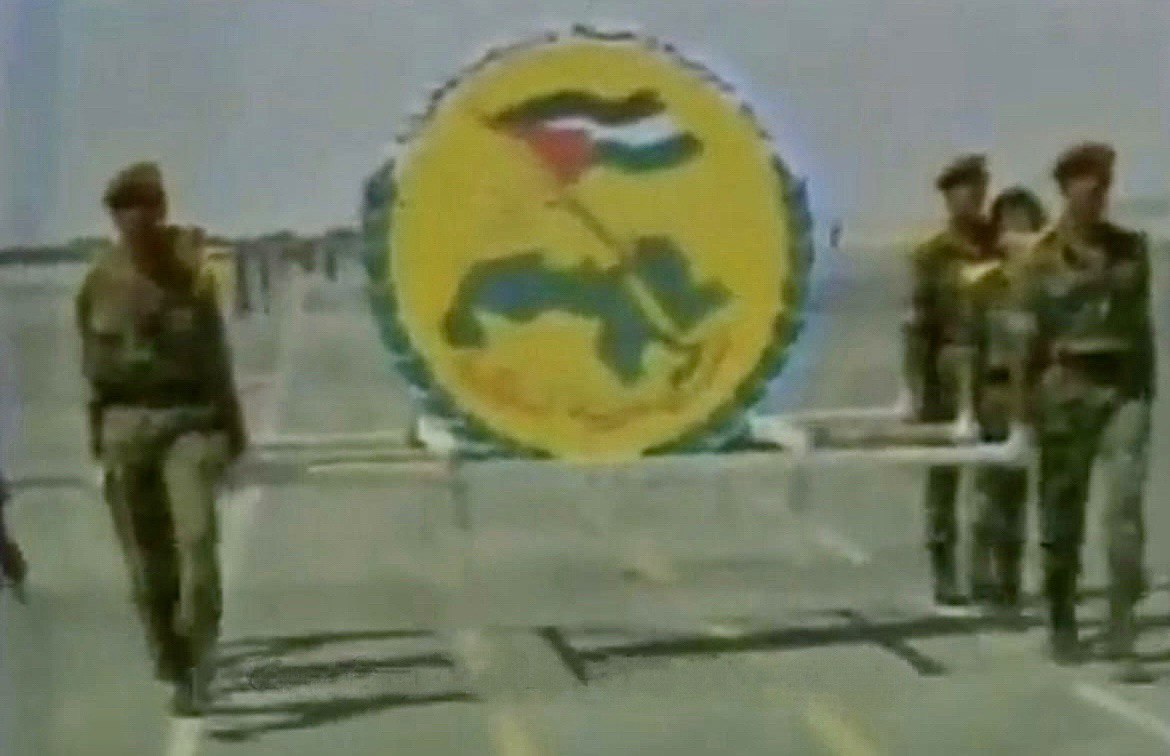
Soldiers carry the logo of Ba'ath Party during parade, 1990

Jadid's security services were purged, some military criminal investigative powers were transferred to the police. He made overtures to the Writers' Union, rehabilitating those who had been forced underground, jailed or sent into exile for representing what radical Ba'athists called the reactionary classes. As he said, "I am determined that you shall no longer feel strangers in your own country." Although Assad did not democratize the country, he eased the government's repressive policies. The Corrective Movement also constitutionally enshrined the key role of the president in governing the country - but the president's power rested on the army and the party, without which he could not safely govern it. Under Assad, the party began to take steps to allow other political groups to govern the country (though still to a lesser extent than the Ba'athists). In February of 1971, a People's Council was created, which included 87 Ba'athists, 40 Nasserists, and even 8 communists. In 1972, Ba'ath Party formed so-called National Progressive Front - coalition of leftist non-Ba'athist groups (Salah Jadid rejected the formation of any coalition with non-Ba'athist groups in Syria), to provide for a limited degree of participation in government by political parties other than the ruling Party. However, some observers note that, contrary to the logic of a more pluralistic policy, during the Corrective Movement program, the Ba'ath Party's control over the state only strengthened. The party eventually turned into an instrument of ideological mobilization of the population.

After the 1970 coup, totalitarian control over the party was weakened and allowed for some debate - a system that allowed the Assad regime to assess the level of its support within the party and put forward suitable new initiatives to strengthen it. For example, such a system led to the revision of the Fourth Five-Year Plan after the Seventh Regional Party Congress in January 1980, so that it would allow the government to secure maximum support from peasants in the face of the Islamist uprising. The Assad government also launched massive campaigns to recruit new people to the Ba'ath Party: the party actively sought to spread its doctrine to all levels of society with the aim of becoming a truly mass party, and in particular to the peasants: the main propaganda campaign was concentrated in the countryside and was aimed at attracting peasants, which already in the first years led to the destruction of many "traditional" ties or loyalties among the peasants. The party also controlled all popular organizations, such as youth, peasant unions or trade unions (known under the general term munazzimat sha'abiya).

But, despite the beautiful slogans, liberalization did not mean decentralization of power - Syria remained a highly centralized state with a single ruling party. Political leniency was reversed in the early 1980s, when the regime, after suppressing the Islamist uprising, reverted to the same level of totalitarianism as under Salah Jadid. However, in the 1990s, Assad resumed leniency, issuing amnesties and releasing thousands of political prisoners, including those convicted under Law No. 49, or the Revolution Protection Law. On December 20, 1995, Law No. 18 was signed, declaring a general amnesty for all crimes committed before November 16 of that year. On July 12, 1999, a new legislative decree, Decree No. 3, was signed, which also declared a second general amnesty for all those who committed crimes after 1995 but before March 11 of this (1999) year.

=== Foreign policy ===
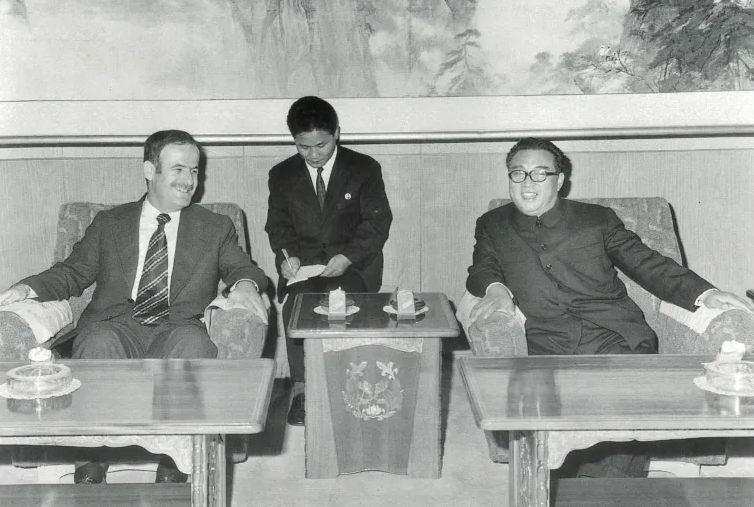
Assad with Kim Il Sung in Pyongyang, 1974

Initially, the Corrective Movement brought Syria to "a new sphere of international recognition," in the words of the New York Times, and gradually began to lift Syria out of its status as an isolated and aggressive (even toward other Arab countries) state. Assad's popularity grew rapidly both in Syria and abroad throughout the 1970s, especially after the Yom Kippur War. His calm but firm character resonated with a large part of the Syrian people.

Syria's policy towards Israel has remained unchanged for decades - at best, sometimes adjusted in propaganda - but the demands for the return of the Golan Heights and all occupied Arab territories have not gone away, although over time Syria has demonstrated an increasing inclination towards negotiations rather than war. Syria's foreign policy under Hafez al-Assad also was aimed at disrupting any peace talks with Israel that did not involve the return of the Golan Heights, as well as building up its military force to increase its ability to conduct a military confrontation with the IDF. His success in driving Israeli and even US forces out of Lebanon in favor of his own state army brought him even more attention and respect. The Corrective Movement also tried to reach out to other Arab countries with which relations had become bad during Jadid's rule (such as Saudi Arabia and Jordan) and achieved some initial results: the anti-Jordanian "Voice of the Palestinian Revolution" radio and the anti-Saudi "Voice of the Arabian Peninsula" radio were closed down, and relations with both countries were restored for a time even before the Yom Kippur War.

Under Assad, Syria continued its policy of rapprochement with the Soviet Union. In 1983, the two countries ratified an agreement on cooperation in nuclear energy. However, although Syria had forged close relations with the USSR, it did not become its puppet state. While maintaining his independence in decision-making, Assad skillfully navigated between the USSR and the United States.

== Social reforms ==
Assad promoted slogans of "opening to the people" (al-infitah ala al-Sha'ab). The expansion of the social base achieved already in the first years of the Corrective Movement allowed Hafez al-Assad to consolidate his control over Syria. The policies dictated by the Corrective Movement succeeded in creating a sense of national unity among Syrians after decades of instability and fragmentation. A certain group of people (specifically, those who participated in the 1920-1928 uprisings in Syria against the French colonialists) were given the title of Mujahideen and promised an old-age pension after receiving a corresponding card from the Ministry of the Interior. Particular attention was paid to popular organizations in order to gain the trust of the broader masses; the party held discussions with their leadership to discuss how to direct their activities in the right direction in accordance with the new policy.

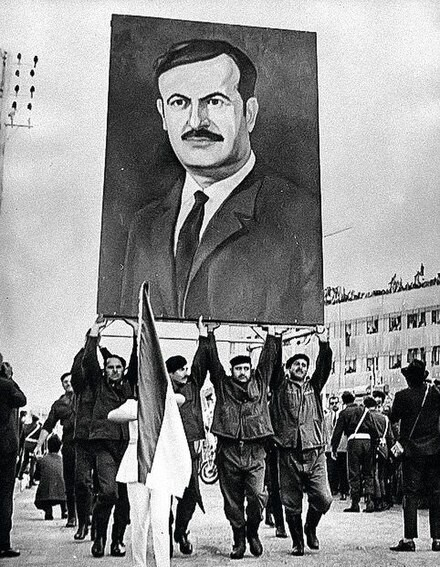
Marching with giantic portrait of Assad

In the early years, highly politicized plays and films were even allowed to be shown, debunking official propaganda versions and worldviews, and even ridiculing members of the government. There were even rumors that if a play could make Hafez al-Assad personally laugh, it was allowed to be shown to the public.

Hafez al-Assad was a secularist, not an atheist like Jadid, so he began to pursue secular domestic policies instead of anti-religious ones. Initially, he did not even include a clause that the president should be a Muslim in the new constitution of 1973, but conservative Muslims strongly opposed this, and under their pressure, this clause was included there anyway. Secular nature of the Ba'ath Party turned conservative Muslims against it.

On September 23, 1974, Legislative Decree No. 93 was issued, establishing the Ministry of Housing and Public Utilities of Syria. The purpose of the ministry was, for example, to solve the housing problem and provide citizens with comfortable housing (Article 1-1, paragraph A of Decree No. 93), to resolve issues of urban planning "in order to ensure the requirements of the social development plan" (Article 1-1, paragraph B of Decree), to supply populated areas with clean drinking water (Article 1-1, paragraph C of Decree), or to maintain sanitation (Article 1-1, paragraph D of Decree), as well as general supervision of urban planning and organizations associated with this activity.

On the same date, Legislative Decree No. 94 was issued, establishing the Ministry of Energy. The ministry assumed all responsibilities previously borne by the Ministries of Oil, Electricity, and Mineral Resources, replacing all three of these ministries. The Ministry of Energy, for example, was responsible for providing Syria with electricity in the quantities necessary for the population (Article 4, paragraph 1 of Legislative Decree No. 94), overseeing the distribution and supply of electricity (Article 4, paragraph 2 of Decree), and supervising its production (Article 4, paragraph 4 of Decree). In addition, Legislative Decree No. 94 created Section 75 in the budget for the financial year, related to the ministry and receiving an appropriation of 300,000 Syrian pounds, covered by profits from other sectors of the annual budget.

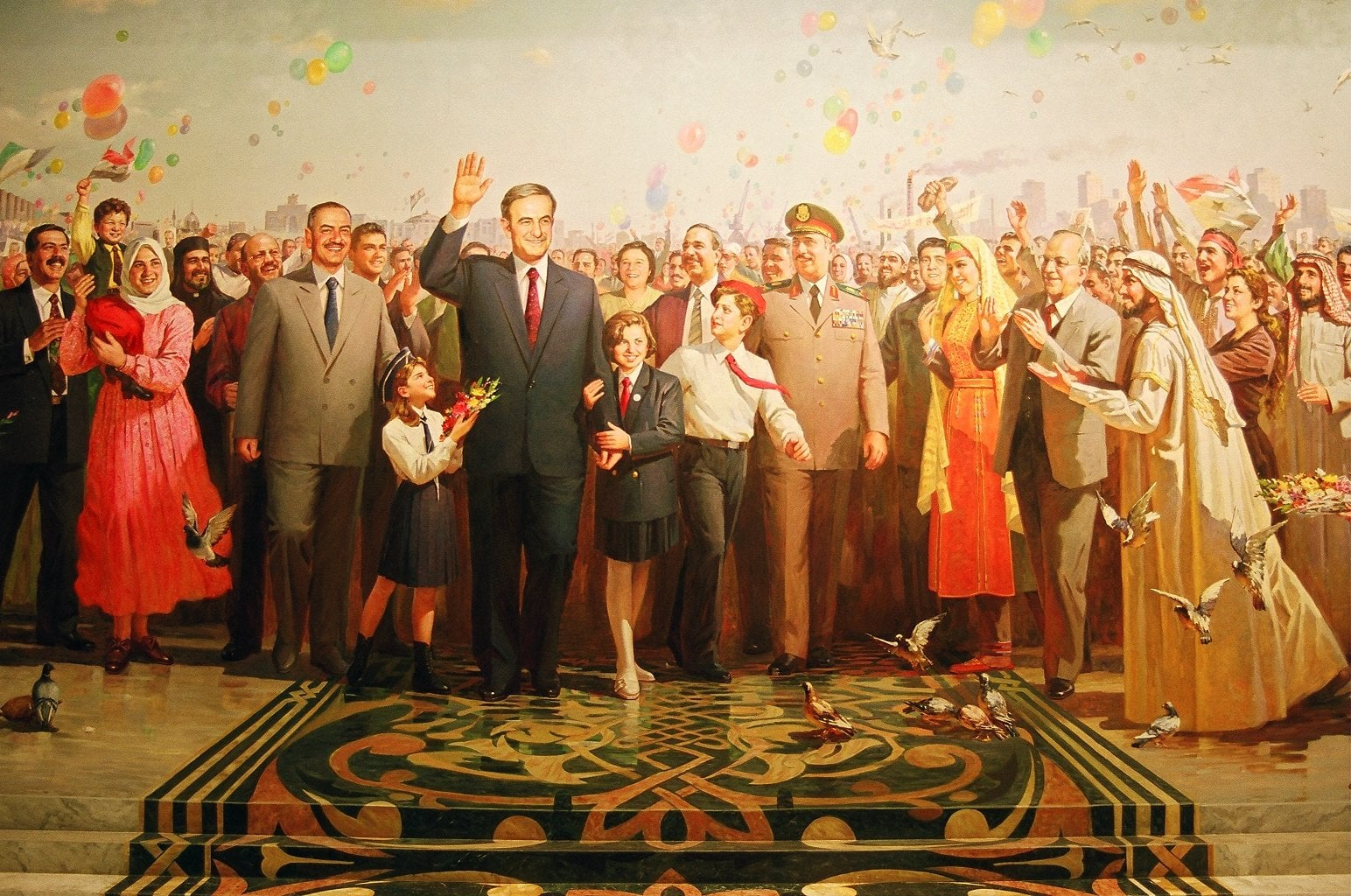
North Korean painting, depicting president Assad in the crowd of joyful people

On November 24, 1980, Law No. 65 was passed, promising all civilian and military employees state compensation for heating. On August 16, 1981, Law No. 35 was issued, declaring education compulsory for every Syrian citizen. It required all guardians to enroll their children in schools for formal education. It also established a so-called Office of Compulsory Education in each Syrian province. The government also actively promoted the "National Childhood Vaccination Campaign."

Despite the relative liberalization of the economy, the government continued to regulate prices for domestic consumers. Government control over the prices of most food products allowed them to issue so-called "family food cards"—if available, these cards allowed their holders to purchase limited quantities of food at prices well below market prices. Furthermore, for example, the government subsidized flour for bakeries, allowing them to sell bread at low prices. This wasn't always beneficial and could create shortages or exacerbate existing ones.

=== Peasants ===
In the early years of his rule, Hafez al-Assad did not have enough support among the urban elite, so he relied on the support of peasants (fallahin) from the countryside, who lived much worse than city dwellers: Assad, who grew up in a peasant family, considered the peasants his natural allies. The Corrective Movement program was also aimed at improving the situation of rural areas and better providing them with what they did not have: hundreds of villages now had good roads, electricity networks, and quality medical facilities: thus, peasants gained easier access to education and medical care. The party's main propaganda campaign was concentrated in rural areas and aimed at attracting peasants.

Here is citation from a study of Ba'athist performance in the villages in 1974:

The Ba'athist ideology with its blend of egalitarianism and nationalism seems a well-pitched appeal to Syrian peasants. The invocation of nationalist symbols against a background of Syrian activism in the Arab nationalist cause, and outside threats and blows against Syria, appear to tap a deep-rooted peasant nationalism. Many peasants are attracted by components of social reform in the ideology which coincide with their own interests. Many younger peasants, less oriented than their elders to tradition, seem to be very receptive to the prospects of modernization evoked by the Ba'ath Party.

Decree No. 94, which established the Ministry of Energy, also obliged this ministry to provide electricity and lighting to rural areas, which is enshrined in paragraph 3 of Article 4 of the decree.

=== Women ===
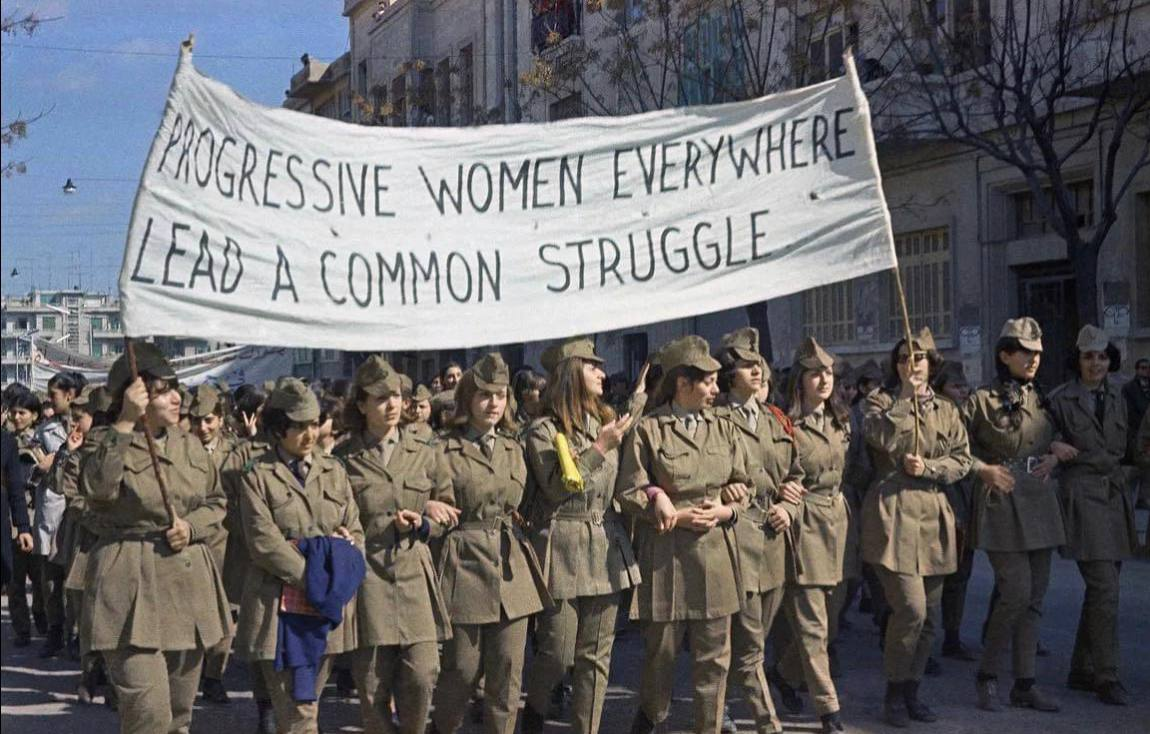
March of women in military uniform in Damascus. They have banner that says "Progressive women everywhere lead a common struggle".

The reformist campaign initially also liberalized a number of laws concerning the economic and political status of Syrian women. The participation of women in the industrial industry rose from 13 percent in 1971 to 23 percent by 1981 (but by 1990s it decreased sharply to 9 percent); In the service sector, it rose from 18 percent in 1970 to 47 percent in 1981. If in 1981 women in the active public sector were only 30 percent of workers, then by the mid-1990s this percentage increased to 40.

The party had been committed to involving women in Syria's development since 1963, but with Assad's rise to power, this commitment increased. Between 1970 and the late 1990s, the number of girls in the education system dramatically increased due to the Ba'ath Party initiative to combat illiteracy. The Ba'ath Party has generally increased its emphasis on education development under Assad, including by militarizing it. Education for girls was made free and compulsory, and the path to political and military careers was opened for girls. During Hafez al-Assad's rule, videos of female paratroopers in military uniform were distributed as an argument for the party's modernity and progressiveness. The role of women in the army was also expanded, although they did not participate in combat operations. In the ranks of the army, measures were also taken to prevent discrimination against women on the basis of gender: this was officially strictly prohibited by the Law on Military Service.

On January 9, 1972, Legislative Decree No. 4 was issued. The law obliged the state to provide compensation (Family Allowance) to women with children working in state-owned enterprises if the woman is widowed/divorced/her husband does not receive Family Allowance from the state.

== Militarization ==
During Assad's rule, the Armed Forces were institutionalized and even more politized, becoming the main support of his regime - Assad most often consulted with military commanders on matters of foreign policy. During Assad's tenure, the army also faced the highest level of ideological indoctrination: in 1975, Assad declared in a speech that 80 percent of the soldiers killed in the Yom Kippur War were Ba'athists. The party itself also claimed to have created an "ideological army" (Al-Jaish Al-Aqaidi).

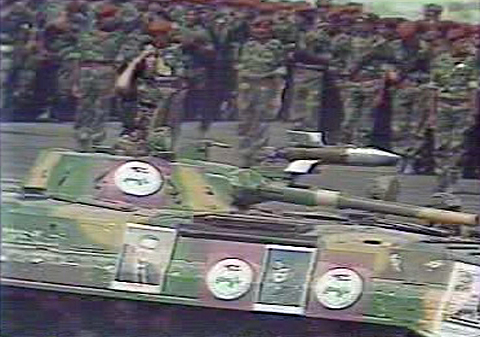
Military parade in 1990

The Syrian government was deeply concerned about the fact that the United States continued to supply Israel with sophisticated weapons and support it financially and politically. The Assad regime has been able to benefit greatly from Syria's position as a confrontational military state on the border with Israel. Thanks to its position, Syria received financial aid from the Soviet Union and (intermittently) from the Arab world, which allowed it to constantly invest huge amounts of money in the development of the army, the costs of which were constantly growing. With the withdrawal of Egypt from the Soviet zone of influence in the late-1970s, Syria's role became especially important for the Soviet Union. During the eighth regional congress in 1985, the Ba'ath Party did an impressive job of constantly expanding its military capabilities – by the mid-1980s, the government needed to make numerous changes to its public investment system – cutting costs in some places and postponing other projects – in order to have as much money as possible available for purchasing weapons.

The Corrective Movement supported the creation of a powerful state army to be capable of military confrontation with Israel. Therefore, military spending has been a significant and priority item in the Syrian economy for decades. Thus, even in 1991, national security spending amounted to almost $2.5 billion, equivalent to 32 percent of the entire state budget. In 1982, Syria spent $2.4 billion on defense and internal security, which was 30 percent of the total government budget for the year, and already in 1984 this figure exceeded $3 billion. If in 1967 the Syrian army included only 50,000 soldiers, by 1987 this figure had increased to 500,000. Syria was one of the four largest arms importers in the world (between 1961 and 1979, it imported weapons worth $7.4 billion, one of the highest figures). In terms of the number of heavy weapons, Syria was superior to the armies of Israel, France and Great Britain.

In 1990, Syria was the fourth most militarized country in the world in proportion to population, with 35.9 soldiers for every 1,000 inhabitants, and the 12th highest per capita defense spender.Militarism became a visible part of Syrian society - even the civilian sectors of the country were affected by it. This was especially evident in schools and educational institutions - students were required to wear official school uniforms, which were very similar to military uniforms; attend special classes known as "Futuwa", where they were taught how to assemble, repair and use weapons; and were sent to special military camps for 15 days, where they were introduced even more closely to the life of a soldier. As a result, the education system in Syria has become heavily militarized.

== Assadization ==
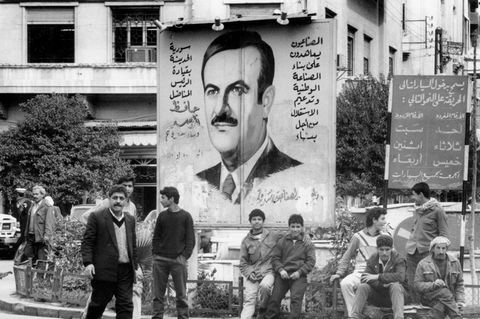
Graffiti depicting Hafez al-Assad in 1980s

Assad took into account the experience of his predecessors who did not hold power for long. Therefore, he successfully consolidated his power by placing people close to him or loyal Alawites in absolutely all the top positions - this process became known as the Assadization of Syria. As a result, strong loyalist networks of the ruling party, army and state apparatus have formed in Syria, as well as a large-scale cult of Assad's personality and a powerful propaganda machine. Also, during the Assad era, so-called “loyalty marches” became widespread – it was a socio-political events in which Syrians marched with portraits of the president.

== Aftermath ==
The Corrective Movement program encountered difficulties, but it accomplished its goal of building a strong militaristic state that would survive the collapse of communism throughout the world. Syria has become a stable and strong country with truly centralized power: professional and combat-ready army turned Syria into regional power. Ba'athist Syrian foreign minister Farouk al-Sharaa said in January 2000, "I am not exaggerating when I say that the Corrective Movement, which took place in 1970 under the leadership of Hafez al-Assad ... has crystallized for the first time in modern Arab history a mature and realistic pan-Arab ideology."

By the end of the 1980s, the communist regimes of the Eastern bloc (and the world in general) were rapidly collapsing one after another, which presented a serious ideological challenge to the government of Hafez al-Assad, but Syrian propaganda confidently and regularly asserted that the path chosen by the Syrian Ba'ath Party was the only correct one, so what was happening to other socialist governments around the world had nothing to do with Syria. As Tishreen newspaper stated:

The collapse of the regimes that used to call themselves socialist in Eastern Europe does not mean the end of socialism and the collapse of socialist thinking. Rather it signals the collapse of a pattern of socialist practice that will be rightly judged and assessed by history... The importance of the Corrective Movement led by struggler Hafez al-Assad can be seen. This movement advanced the principle of political and economic pluralism almost two decades ago. It also devised methods for political and social development that proved capable of withstanding the toughest foreign pressures.

== See also ==
- Assadism
- Ba'athist Iraq
- Corrective Move
- Infitah
- June 13 Corrective Movement
- Revolutionary Corrective Initiative
- Saddamism
