= Assadization =

Consolidation of power by president Assad

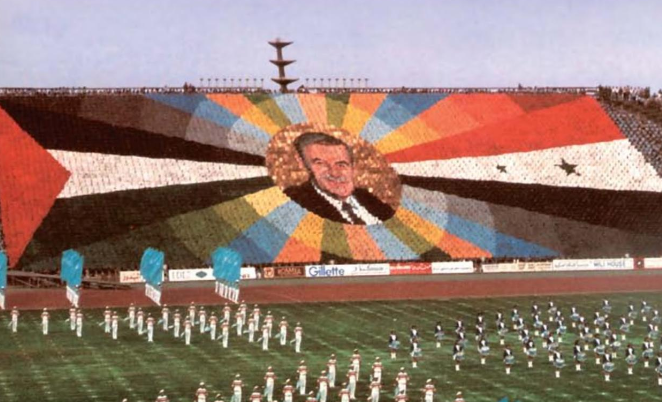
Portrait of Hafez al-Assad during the 1987 Mediterranean Games opening ceremony

Assadization, sometimes also called Alawization, refers to the process of consolidation of power in Ba'athist Syria, which started under President Hafez al-Assad. Assadization had no clear time frame, with it beginning almost immediately after the Assad family came to power and continuing until the fall of the Assad regime. The desire of the Assad family to build a personalistic dictatorship led to the general Assadization of all spheres of life in the country, including the army, the party, the education system, as well as to the spread of propaganda and the cult of personality. The term "Assadization" has also become a household word in some news articles.

The debunking of the personality cult and the entire legacy of the Assad regime became known as De-Assadization.

== Hafez al-Assad's presidency ==
Syrian army general Hafez al-Assad came to power in 1970, after he launched a coup d'etat, known as the "Corrective Revolution".

Jadid's radical Marxist policies alienated almost all sectors of Syrian society, so his overthrow was greeted with equal relief by almost everyone. Despite serious disagreements, Assad supported most of Jadid's policies, but in contrast, he turned out to be much more pragmatic. The coup led to the final dominance of the security forces over the government and the party.

=== Economic reforms ===
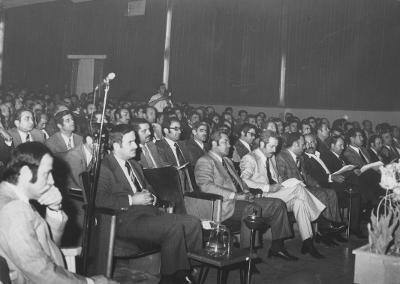
Assad during the Party's Sixth Regional Congress, 1975

Assad announced Syria's abandonment of the radical political and social policies of his ousted predecessor Salah Jadid (which he disapproved of even before the coup) in favor of a more moderate policy. He called his reformist campaign the "Corrective Movement." Assad lowered prices on basic products (and in subsequent years they were constantly regulated by the state and remained low), abolished confiscation of goods, and encouraged the private sector. Assad's actions resulted in increased incomes for many workers and farmers, and the state provided citizens with better healthcare and education services, which were free. However, Assad's largely failed foreign policy (as well as events that he could not influence) led Syria back to isolation, and later to a deficit and shortages of goods, which led to the introduction of austerity measures in mid-1980s. The push for militarization, as well as huge (and ever-growing) military spending, also put significant pressure on the Syrian economy during the crisis years.

When the communist governments in the Eastern Bloc collapsed, an ideological crisis within the government arose. However, Assad and his supporters hit back, stating that because of the "Corrective Movement under the leadership of the warrior Hafez al-Assad", the principles of economic and political pluralism, which had been introduced "some two decades" beforehand, safeguarded the Syrian government from the possibility of collapse.

=== Political changes ===
At the 11th National Congress, Assad assured party members that his leadership was a radical change from that of Jadid, and he would implement a "corrective movement" to return Syria to the true "nationalist socialist line". At first, Assad took a course toward softening the government's repressive policies. He visited villages and listened to citizens' complaints, eased repression, and rehabilitated some of the victims of Jadid's regime.

However, political liberalization did not last very long - after the brutal suppression of the Islamist uprising in 1982, the Assad regime rolled back to a level of totalitarianism comparable to Jadid's. Assad has stepped up his drive to centralize power in the hands of the president (him) and has severely curtailed the role of the Ba'ath Party, banning open debate and ending the relatively democratic elections of its delegates to the congresses. In essence, Assad has returned to the version of totalitarian and militaristic Leninism that Jadid had previously promoted.

== Policy of Assadization ==
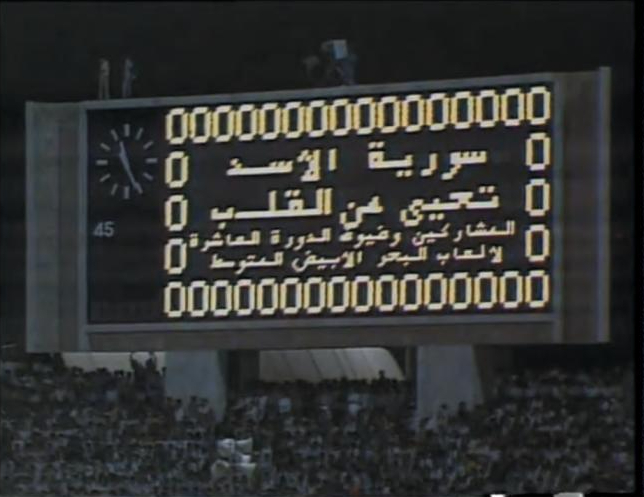
During the period of Assadization, many geographical features were named or renamed after the Assad family. This welcoming message on a scoreboard during the opening ceremony of the 1987 Mediterranean Games in Latakia literally says: "Assad's Syria cordially greets the participants and guests of the Tenth Mediterranean Games."

Hafez al-Assad took into account the experience of his predecessors, who did not hold power for long. Therefore, he began a very active policy of consolidating power, known as Assadization which persisted for the entire duration of the Assad family's rule in Syria. The Assadization policy led to the formation of a broad system of family and Alawite elites in the state, which was initially structured as a military elite and grew out of the security forces. Assadization led to the monopolization of the political, military and economic elite by the Assad family. The armed forces and mukhabarat created by Hafez al-Assad from his trusted associates became the main support of his regime.

When Bashar al-Assad became president in 2000, he continued the policies of Assadization while simultaneously positioning himself as a progressive reformer. Under Bashar, the loyal oligarchy (so-called "New Class") gained even more power and influence. Thanks to the Assadization policy, Bashar was able to maintain his reliable support base for a long time during the civil war.

=== Social life ===
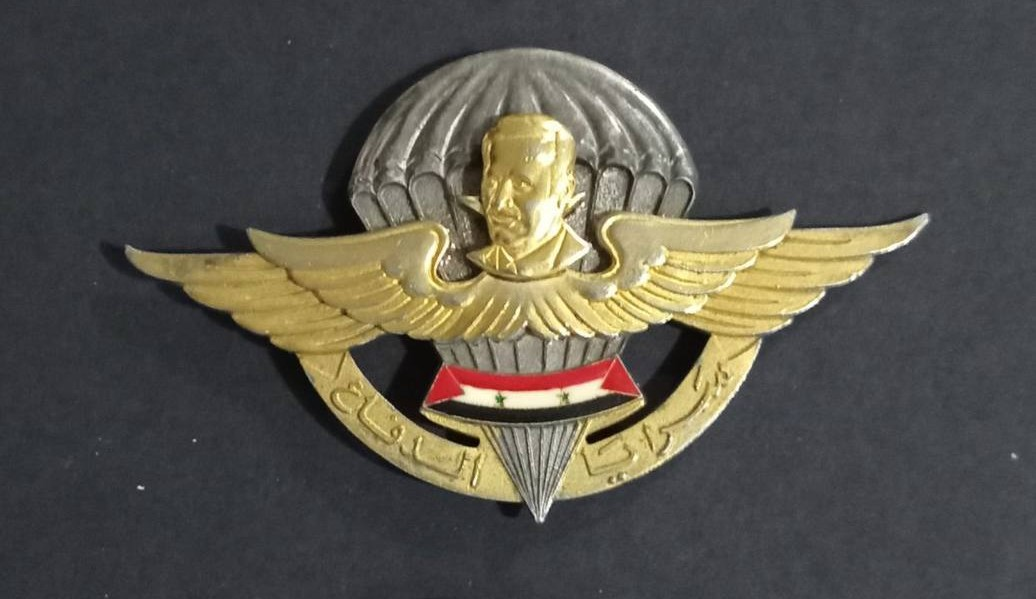
The badge of the Defense Brigades, second version of design. It contains face of president Assad.

In the social sphere of the country's life, Assadization led to the formation of an extensive personality cult, which, by some estimates, even surpassed the personality cult of Mao Zedong or Josip Broz Tito. State propaganda made great efforts to identify the entire Syrian state with the Assad family. Over the decades of Assad's rule, the term "Assadist Syria" has taken hold and spread. Although Assad was not a Stalinist, he built a personality cult around himself on the Stalinist model: it was formed in collaboration with propagandists from a number of communist regimes, such as the USSR, Romania and North Korea.

Hafez al-Assad was everywhere - in the form of statues and portraits on the streets, in government and educational institutions, on school notebooks, postage stamps, documents, even on the badge of the Defense Brigades militia (the model was adopted after 1984) his face was forged. His quotes were memorized in schools, songs were sung in his honor, and people marched through the streets with his portraits. Assadization also led to the formation of large-scale propaganda and sowed fear of the government among the population.

=== Religion ===
Hafez al-Assad was extremely opposed to the political forms of Islam during his reign in Ba'athist Syria. The Assad family's cult of personality sometimes presented Assad as a godlike figure - numerous portraits of him showed him apparently possessing magical powers or standing next to the Prophet Muhammad, and officials were forced to call him "the sanctified one" (al-Muqaddas). Propaganda called him an immortal and eternal leader. The Assadization of religion in Syria has led to it becoming another means of neo-Ba'athist propaganda - through it, the Assad regime promoted a neo-Ba'athist worldview and his own personality cult. The government also began the "nationalization" of religion through its loyal network of clergy, condemning anyone who deviated from the "Ba'athist version of Islam", calling them a threat to society. President Assad's actions have led to the formation of a leftist-nationalist worldview in Syrian society, aimed at rejecting Islamists and general subordination to the Alawite president. as Dr. Esther Meininghaus wrote, "The recent slogan of 'Bashar, Allah, Suriyya wa-bas' (Bashar, God, and Syria – that's it) possibly best epitomises how close the regime has come to creating a Syrian public religion in its own right. Whether the outward performance of 'regime rituals' was actually fully internalised or secretly mocked, it had to be practised and obeyed."

The Ba'ath Party promoted total secularism. During the civil war, it began to emphasize its secular ideas especially strongly, portraying all its enemies as Islamist fanatics. Since the start of the war, Bashar al-Assad's regime has equated religion with patriotism and openly linked religious affiliation with its security, relying on the faith of loyalists. In addition, the regime involved women in the process of Assadization of religion, under the pretext of its modernization, by appointing women to positions in religious ministries.

=== Army, mukhabarat and Ba'ath party ===
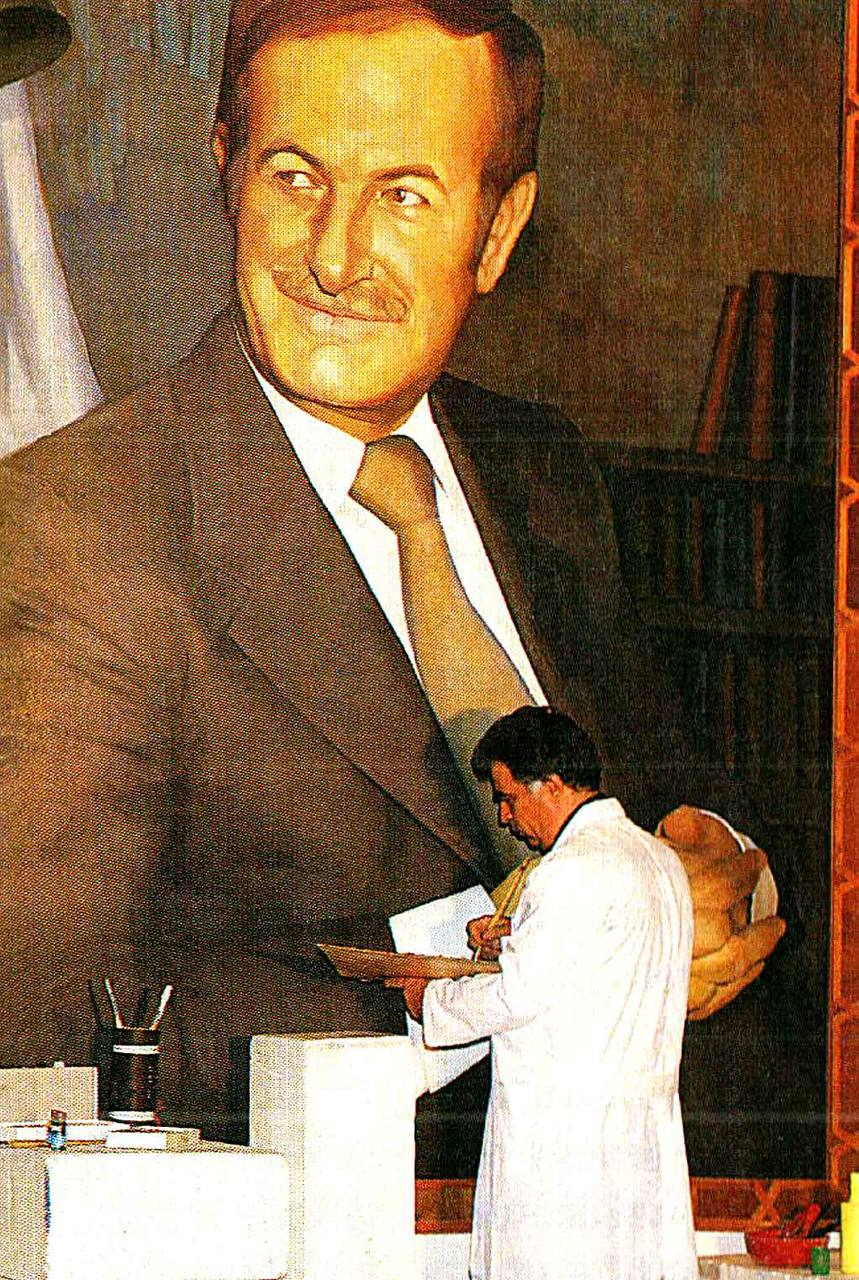
A Syrian artist paints a huge portrait of a President Assad, 1974

Almost from the very beginning, Assad began to form a political base for himself, separate from the Ba'ath Party. The longer Assad was in power, the more he "Assadized" the armed forces, the mukhabarat, and the ruling party. Assad consolidated power through his relatives and through the Alawites (and occasionally the Sunnis who were very close to him). When Assad wanted to promote his close and loyal people, they could rise up the hierarchy to the highest positions with astonishing speed. Assad quickly purged all disloyal party members and officers, replacing them mainly with loyal Alawites: the purges completely destroyed the influence of non-Assadist groups in the party, such as the Aflaqists, and the Alawites became the dominant sect in the state apparatus and government.

== Formation of al-Jama'a ==
The Assad's inner circle, helped implement the Assadization campaign, was the most powerful political elite in the country, was called the "al-Jama'a" ("Company"). It was this group of people who were the most important of all those who influenced the president's decisions. The al-Jama'a main tasks were to assist Assad in defending the regime from his opponents; to assist in the effective governance of Syria; and to advise Assad on the most important domestic and foreign policy issues. Conflicts persisted within the al-Jama'a, but it was entirely loyal to Hafez al-Assad personally. Elite army unit commanders (for example, those responsible for guarding the presidential palace or media stations) occupied a special place within the al-Jama'a. The most prominent were the Special Forces and (until 1984) the Defense Companies.

== Purges ==
=== 1971-1972 ===
Assad went on to establish a separate power base apart from the party. As early as January 1971, a number of Syrians were arrested on charges of collaborating with Iraqi intelligence services. Suspecting sympathisers of the Old Guard as a threat to his power, Hafez al-Assad carried out a purge in 1971, rounding up hundreds of party members and conducted a showtrial against Michel Aflaq, former Syrian President Amin al-Hafiz and numerous Ba'athists. Aflaq, Amin and three Baath leaders were sentenced to death via absentia, while ninety-nine party members were imprisoned on accusations of collaboration with the Iraqi Ba'ath. Leaders of the Old Guard like Aflaq and Amin al-Hafiz had found refuge in Baghdad, following the 1968 Ba'athist seizure of power in Iraq. The purges erased all remaining influence of Aflaqists within the Syrian Ba'ath party.

Assad also carried out numerous purges and repressions against suspected and proven supporters of Salah Jadid, arresting them on charges of sabotaging the government. In 1971, one of the deposed leader's relatives, Izzat Jadid, was arrested; in June, numerous people were arrested on charges of supporting the deposed regime; in December 1972, a new wave of arrests and detentions took place on the same charges.

=== 1984 ===
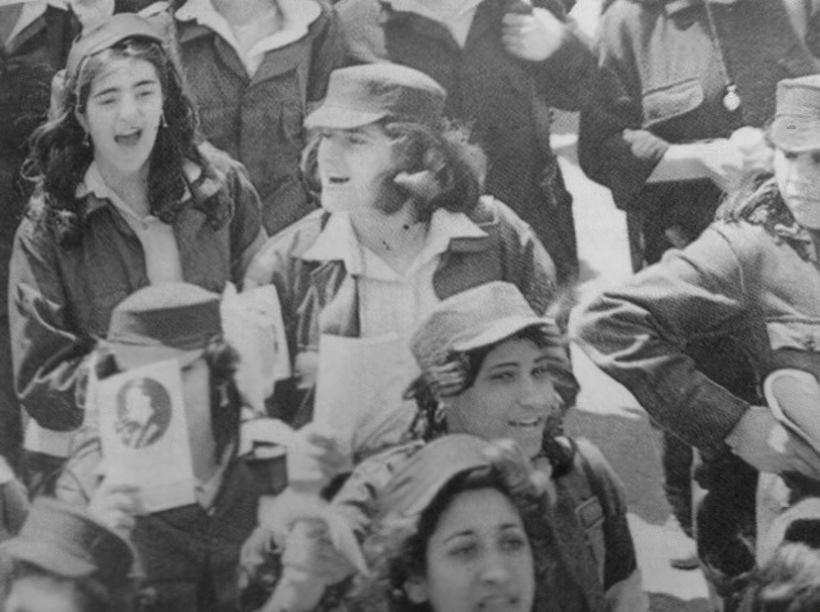
Students in military uniforms at a pro-government demonstration, early 1980s

In what became known as the "poster war", personnel from the Defense Companies replaced posters of Assad in Damascus with those of Rifaat al-Assad. The security service, still loyal to Hafez, responded by replacing Rifaat al-Assad's posters with Hafez's. The poster war lasted for a week until Assad's health improved.Shortly after the poster war, all of Rifaat al-Assad's proteges were removed from positions of power. This decree nearly sparked a clash between the Defense Brigades and the Republican Guard on 27 February 1984.

=== 1990s ===
Skepticism of Assad's dynastic-succession plan was widespread within and outside the government, with critics noting that Syria was not a monarchy. By 1998 Bashar had made inroads into the Ba'ath Party, taking over Khaddam's Lebanon portfolio (a post he had held since the 1970s). By December 1998 Bashar al-Assad had replaced Rafic al-Hariri, Prime Minister of Lebanon and one of Khaddam's proteges, with Salim al-Huss. Several Assad proteges, who had served since 1970 or earlier, were dismissed from office between 1998 and 2000. They were sacked not because of disloyalty to Assad, but because Assad thought they would not fully support Bashar al-Assad's succession. "Retirees" included Muhammad al-Khuli, Nassir Khayr Bek and Ali Duba. Among the new appointees (Bashar loyalists) were Bahjat Sulayman, Major General Hassan Khalil and Major General Assef Shawkat (Assad's son-in-law).

== De-Assadization ==
After the fall of the Assad regime, De-Assadization was a policy of the Syrian caretaker and transitional governments formed from the opposition. This policy was similar to the de-Ba'athification of Iraq or the de-Stalinization of the USSR.

De-Assadization was characterized by the mass destruction of the Assad family's cult of personality, such as frescoes, statues, and portraits, as well as a number of laws directed against Ba'athist organizations. For example, the Ba'ath Party, youth and paramilitary groups were disbanded and banned, and a number of members of the former regime were captured by the new security forces.

=== Fall of the Assad regime ===
After 13 years of civil war, Assad regime surprisingly collapsed after a series of offensives by opposition forces. Several Western journalists, academics and geo-political analysts compared the fall of the Assad to the fall of the Berlin Wall in 1989. Meysam Karim Jaffari, a journalist affiliated with Iran's Islamic Revolutionary Guard Corps, told reporters from The New York Times newspaper: "The Berlin Wall of unity for the Axis of Resistance has collapsed."

=== Destruction of symbols ===
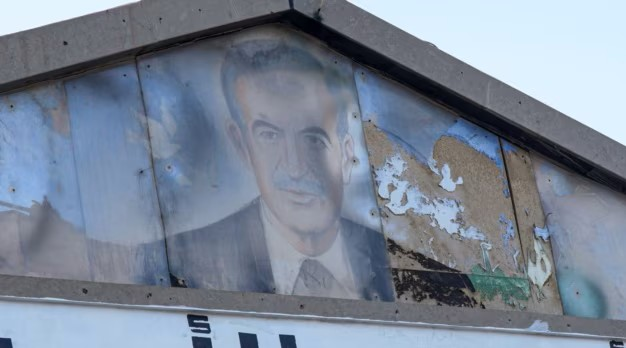
A destroyed portrait of Hafez al-Assad after the collapse of his son's regime

In general, the process of de-Assadization existed before the fall of the Assad regime, in territories not controlled by the government and even outside Syria (for example, depriving Bashar al-Assad of orders previously issued to him by other countries), but as a mass phenomenon and such a term, it became known only after that. Since the regime as such no longer exists, mass destruction of statues, portraits, frescoes and generally everything that in any way symbolized or personified the Assad regime or the Ba'ath Party as a whole began (in general, they took place throughout the entire time of the final offensives on the territories conquered by the opposition forces). Thus, on 11 December, rebels burned coffin of the father of the fugitive president in the city of Qardaha, and on 1 February 2025, his largest statue was demolished in the city of Deir Atiyah. On 29 January 2025, the acceptance of Ahmed al-Sharaa as the president of Syria was officially announced. The new administration announced the suspension of the 2012 constitution, as well as the official dissolution and complete ban on the existence and activities of institutions associated with the overthrown regime: the Ba'ath Party itself, as well as youth organizations, the army, security and intelligence services. At the same time, the new government announced that it would retain the official name "Syrian Arab Republic".

=== Geographical renames ===
After the fall of the Assad regime, the "Bassel al-Assad International Airport" was renamed as the Latakia International Airport. Similarly, the name for Euphrates Lake was restored after the previous name "Lake Assad" fell out of use due to its association with the Assad family.

On 24 December 2024, the Syrian health ministry under the Syrian caretaker government announced a decision to rename 15 hospitals that previously bore Assad's name, and will now be named after the cities that they are located in.

=== Surrender of weapons and persecution of Assadists ===
The new government, aware of the mistakes of de-Ba'athification, offered a less radical option: it promised a full amnesty and the return of civil documents (which had been confiscated under Assad in exchange for military cards) to all soldiers of the deposed regime's military in exchange for their surrendering all their weapons: according to the rebels, 400 arrived on the first day. However, the new security forces also began to carry out operations against former regime members in hiding. These operations eventually resulted in clashes with former Assadists (who were able to organize themselves and form a number of militias), and the clashes led to massacres of Alawites. Some expressed concern that de-Assadization was potentially turning into a "de-Alawization" of Syria.

=== New laws ===
On 13 March, President al-Sharaa signed a draft constitutional declaration that prohibited the glorification of the Assad regime and the denial/glorification of its crimes. The initial penalty for violating the article can often be six months in prison and a fine of $500, which can be doubled if the person violates it again. Article 49 of the constitutional declaration, which addresses this, consists of three points.

The first point provides for the creation of a political body to determine ways to hold criminals of the fallen regime accountable, disseminate information about the crimes of this regime, and honor the memory of its victims.

The second point states that all war crimes committed by the deposed regime are exempt from the principle of non-retroactivity of laws.

The third point criminalizes the glorification of the deposed Assad regime and its symbols, and considers the denial of its crimes or the glorification of them to be crimes punishable by law.

=== De-Assadization of Education ===
Following the fall of Assad in 2024, a transitional government was proposed changes to education system and textbooks were announced. These included a removal of references to Bashar al-Assad, Ba'athism, Assadism, removing references to pre-Islamic deities, religions and people, changes to interpretations of Quranic verses, removal of poetry about women and love, and removing references to the Big Bang theory and evolution from science classes. The subject of "National Education" was cancelled as it was seen as Assadist propaganda, and replaced with Islamic or Christian education. Syria expert Joshua Landis argued that the new textbooks were moving to an "Islamist interpretation of Syrian history".

== See also ==
- Ba'athist Syria
- Assad family
- Terrorism in Ba'athist Syria
