= Militarization of the education in Ba'athist Syria =

Ideological indoctrination (1963 to 2024)

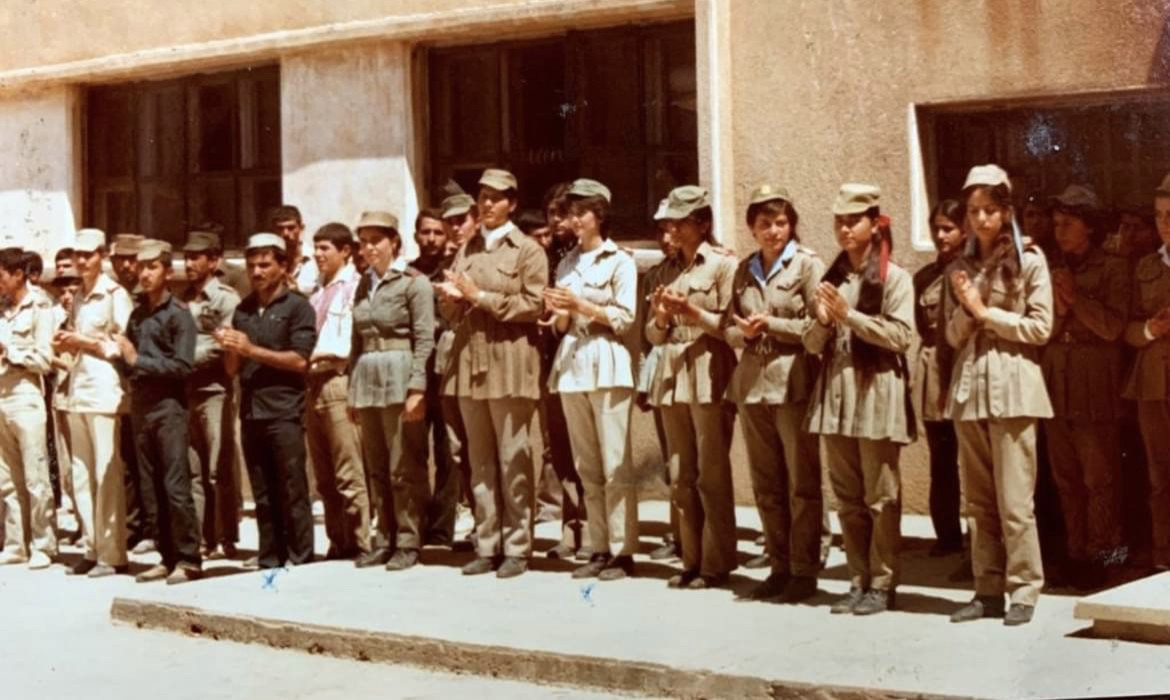
10th grade students in 1984. They wear military uniforms that were quite typical for Syrian schools.

Militarization of the education in Ba'athist Syria is a process of ideological indoctrination in the schools of Ba'athist Syria, aimed at developing a military mindset in the youth and giving them military skills.

In Syria (especially during the rule of President Hafez al-Assad), educational institutions underwent a militaristic transformation and actively participated in the spread of such ideals among the students. Students were often drawn into pro-government marches, and the school itself hosted multiple military exercises and events. there was significant indoctrination of youth through special and mandatory classes. During the rule of Hafez al-Assad, Syria was one of the most militarized states in the world with huge army (500,000 soldiers in 1986) and always rising military spending – Assadism promoted particularly militaristic ideas throughout Syria.

== History ==
=== State control over the education system ===
According to the Syrian Constitution of 1973, Chapter 3: Educational and Cultural Principles, Article 21, it is written:

The educational and cultural system aims at creating a socialist nationalist Arab generation which is scientifically minded and attached to its history and land, proud of its heritage, and filled with the spirit of struggle to achieve its nation's objectives of unity, freedom, and socialism, and to serve humanity and its progress.

A year before adoption of this constitution, in 1972, the charter of the National Progressive Front (a coalition of Syrian leftist parties formed and controlled by neo-Ba'athists) was approved, which prohibited work and any activity of all non-Ba'athist factions on the educational system, leaving it essentially under the control of the Ba'ath Party alone. As a result, the ruling party's ideological views formed the basis of its education policy. To control and shape the educational system, the Ba'ath Party formed two organizations – the Education and Vanguard Bureau (which managed primary and secondary education) and the Higher Education Bureau (which managed higher and university education).

In addition, a number of youth organizations were formed – the National Union of Syrian Students (formed in 1963) was engaged in organizing students in universities and colleges, the Revolutionary Youth Union (formed in 1970) was for middle and high school students aged 12 to 18, and al-Ba'ath Vanguard (formed in 1974) – for elementary school students. These organizations were involved in organizing and conducting various events for students, and actively participated in the propaganda of Assadism and Ba'athism among them, as well as the introduction of a whole list of values and norms of behavior, such as loyalty to the party and the leader. This propaganda proved to be very effective due to the wide availability of education in the country (which was free and compulsory). Thus, Syrian schools were characterized by militaristic and very strict discipline.

=== Introduction and abolition of military education ===
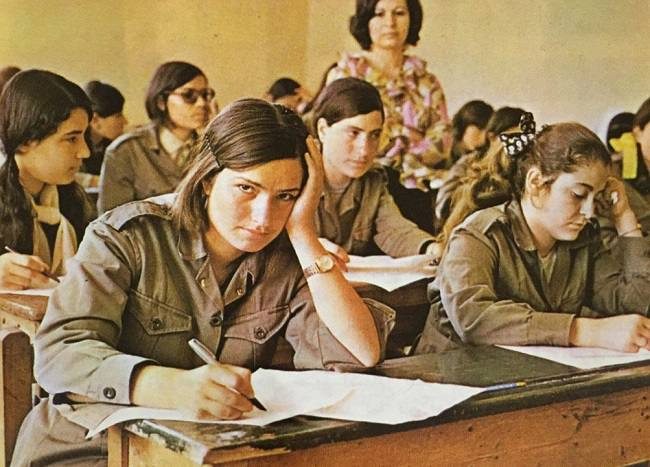
Syrian schools in the early 1970s

The military and "patriotic" education system in Syrian schools began to be introduced in the 1970s after General Hafez al-Assad came to power, although the preconditions for this existed even earlier. The Assad regime was very active in militarizing society – even the civilian sector of the state was given over to strong militarism. Assad's rule led to the formation of a very personalistic ideology based on his thinking and the way he ran the country – Assadism. Assadism promoted a very militaristic agenda. Military education, that was introduced in 1970s, included: mandatory wearing of a military-school uniform, additional (and mandatory) school lessons in the presence of army officers, sending students to military camps for several days to receive training, as well as marches and events with a military focus. Military education eventually became a very large part of the entire education system in Syria during the time of Hafez al-Assad. However, after his death, Bashar al-Assad came to power and set (at least initially) a course of reform. This led to the fact that in May of 2003 all military education in all schools was abolished – classes were removed from the schedule, military camps were replaced by more "civilian" summer activities (supervised by the RYU), and military uniforms were replaced by blue school uniforms for boys and pink for girls.

=== Demands to return military education ===
However, since the start of the civil war in 2011, there have been increasing calls from Ba'athist government officials for the return of military education to schools – for example, the Damascus Provincial Council has stated that the resulting "state of neglect" was the result of the abolition of military education. The Ba'ath Party began to seriously consider reintroducing military education into the school curriculum, in order, as they said, to "combat the immorality of the youth." This idea was also repeatedly discussed at meetings of the Council of the Central Teachers' Union "as a necessity in the conditions of the global war waged by Syria." In 2017, it was announced that military education would eventually be reintroduced into the curriculum. Many supporters of the regime also demanded the restoration of military education in schools. The media expressed concerns that with the return of military education, schools would once again become places for political mobilization of youth. In 2024, the government approved the formation of a "School Discipline Department" to train relevant personnel and manage student behavior and discipline.

== Militarist indoctrination in schools ==
Portraits of President Hafez al-Assad (and Bashar later), flags and symbols of the Ba'ath Party were visible everywhere in educational institutions - in corridors, classrooms and even on school notebooks. For good performance at school or university, certificates were issued in honor of different members of the Assad family: Hafez, Bashar or Bassel.

Even if a person has not yet served in the army and is a student, he will eventually receive some military training, such as assembling weapons, in a schools, run by Assadist youth organizations (such as the RYU), membership in which was mandatory. These organizations would mobilize boys through enforced training and then membership of paramilitary groups. Organizations like the RYU also carried out intensive ideological training and spread of Assadist ideas in schools, helping to create "ideologically correct" youth. School students also were taught Ba'athism and Assadism through a course known as "Political Arab Sociology". Students sat through a lesson every week about how to become an "active Ba'athist" and how to show their love for both the nation and the leader, particularly through celebrating a physically strong body and military training. A compulsory 15-day summer camp gave to male students extra time to learn about the soldiers life, in an attempt to prepare them for compulsory army conscription when they finished high school. During enforced marches to celebrate the “great leader”, at the time, Bashar al-Assad's father, Hafez, Syrians learned by heart the slogan: “With blood and soul, we sacrifice ourselves for you, Hafez.”

During morning assemblies, Syrian students chanted pro-government slogans and even the Ba'ath Party anthem throughout their years of education.

=== Militarist "al-Futuwa" lesson ===
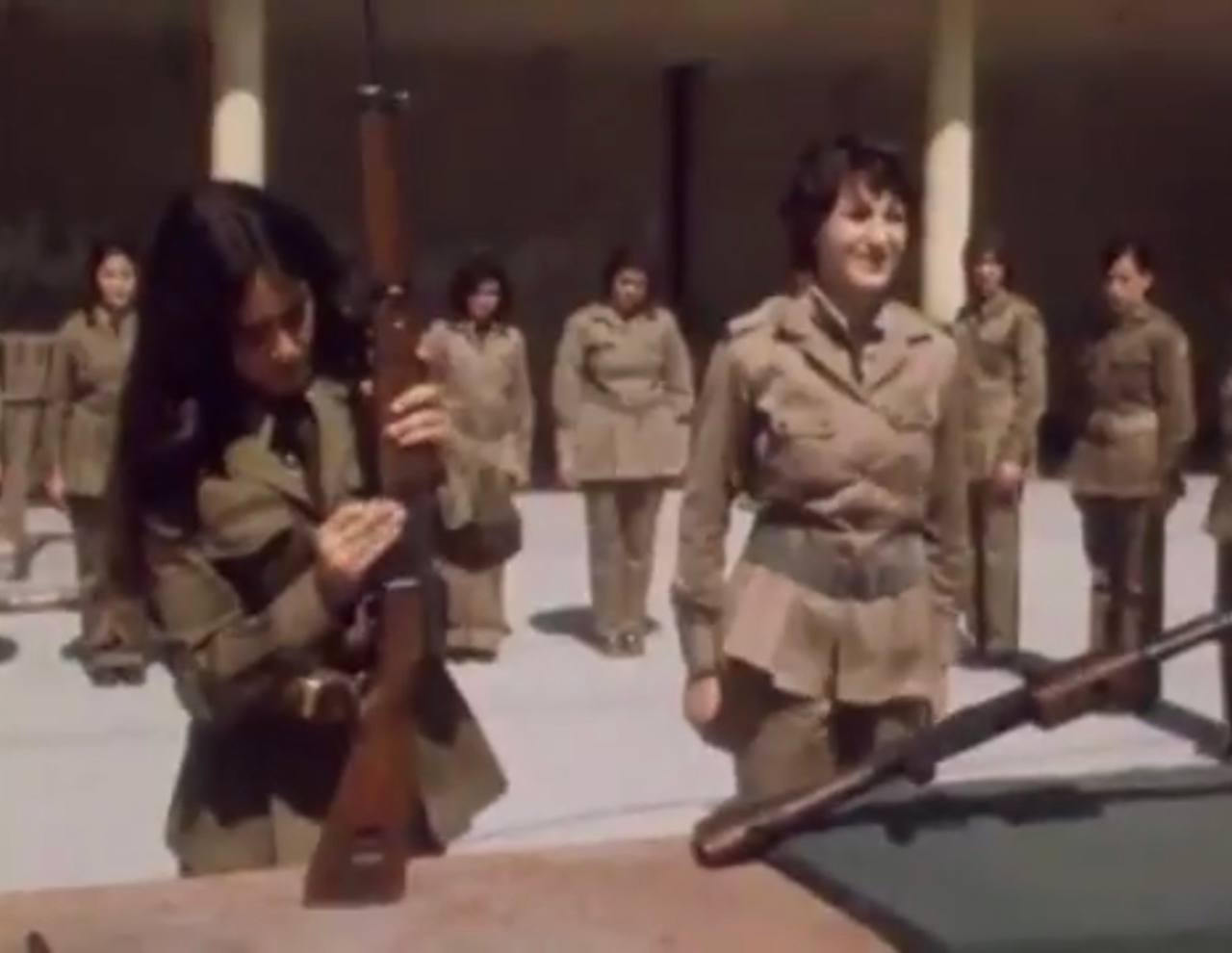
Syrian female students learn how to assemble and disassemble weapons

The militarist lesson was called "al-Futuwa" (the same name as the military uniform that Syrian students were required to wear). The course was first introduced by the Ba'ath Party in 1963 and greatly expanded by Hafez al-Assad later. In the mid-1980s, Futuwa was officially renamed the "Military Education Course", although the original name continued to be used. This class was mandatory for middle and high school students, and was present not only in state schools, but even in private schools. and lasted for an hour and a half. The lesson focused on theoretical and practical military skills, such as assembling, disassembling and using weapons, and was also accompanied by a lesson on "National Education", which covered the achievements of the Ba'ath Party. As early as when they turned 13, students began to be taught how to use weapons. Many former students have spoken of how their schools resembled military barracks. The teacher of this class was responsible for the discipline of the students and checked that they had a uniform - even the absence of some of its elements could result in punishment. Futuwa's instructors and teachers were also responsible for teaching students basic first aid, civil defense, seismic hazards, and how to repair and use weapons. In many ways, students said their problem was not with the class itself, but with the excessive strictness of the instructors. Initially, Futuwa lessons were conducted by officers sent from the army, but later the position of "Futuwa instructor" was introduced. The lesson was mandatory for school credit and attendance.

=== "Moaskar" military camps ===
The class also involved sending students to a military camp, known as the moaskar, for 15 days, where the students lived in soldier-like conditions and were under the command of military officers. Sending to camp was mandatory for all students - both boys and girls. Unofficial filming in these camps was prohibited, as were visits by the students' parents. In these camps, students were intensively trained in the use and construction of weapons and were introduced to army life - military marches, greetings and subordination were a mandatory part. There were cases of violence and beatings in the camps for failures (for example, if a student could not reload a rifle).

In addition to moaskar, there was the "Sai'qa" camp, which was not mandatory, but where one could register in advance, for which the student receives better grades and more points - if he is a registered member of youth organizations.

With the escalation of the Islamist uprising in the late 1970s, the government changed its military conscription policy for students: in exchange for completing appropriate training at university camps, students were promised a reduction of six months in their future military service.

=== Wearing military uniform ===
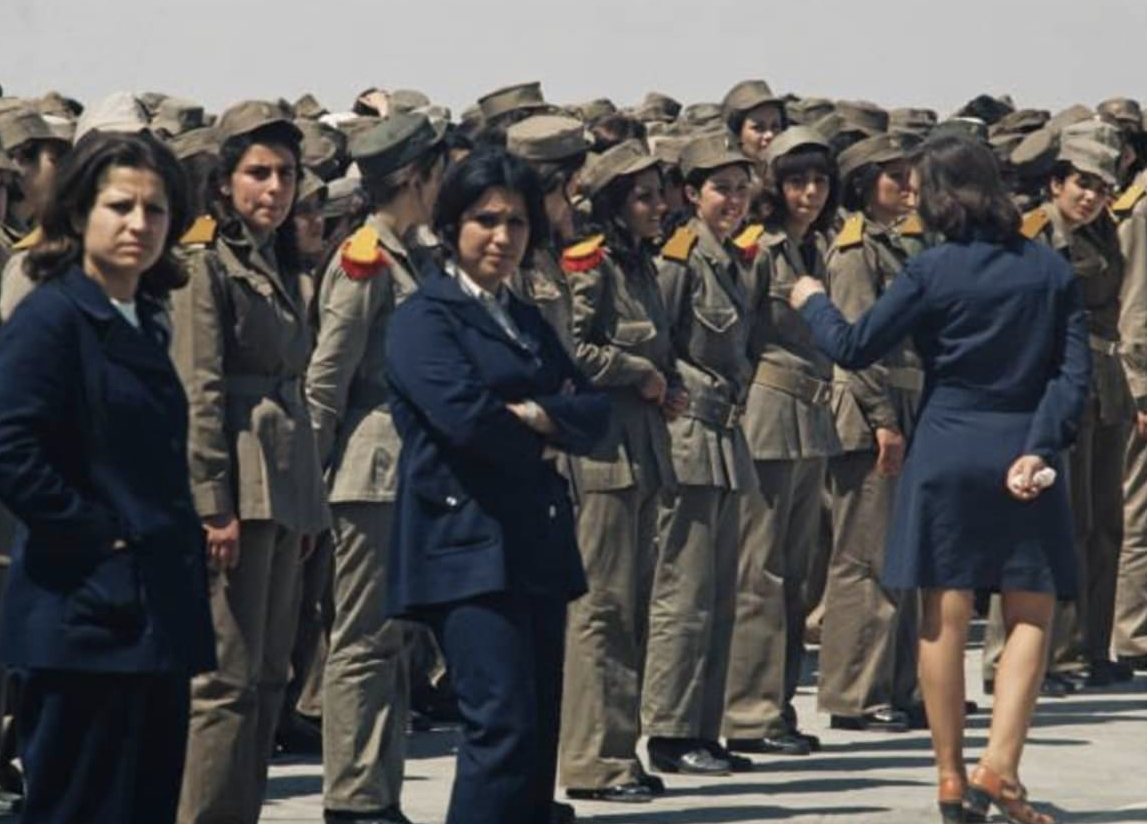
Students during a military ceremony in 1973

Military uniforms were required to be worn by middle and high school students. The military uniform worn by Syrian students was given the same name as a militaristic school lesson - Futuwa. As government officials say, this uniform is inexpensive, meaning it does not require large expenditures from parents, and its wearing by all students hides the potential inequality of students' families in their financial capabilities. The students made attempts to "stand out" despite the requirement to wear the same uniform: at their constant requests, tailors made minor changes to it, such as adding pockets or making trousers wider. This often led to conflicts between students and instructors of the Futuwa military education. The color of the shoulder straps indicated the class: if the shoulder straps were yellow, the student was from middle school, and if they were red, he was from high school. Failure to comply with the dress code could result in severe punishment.

== Consequences ==
The consequence of such a policy towards schools was a very high degree of militarization of the state and its society. In fact, even if a Syrian citizen did not serve in the army, he still knew how to handle a weapon, because he was taught this in school. As a result, by the time the Syrian revolution began in 2011, an entire generation had grown up that had military training since childhood. This generation was still often traumatized by too strict discipline and harsh punishments for misdeeds – and it associated all this (quite logically) with the Assad regime. Many former students during the Hafez al-Assad era have spoken negatively about their experiences of the state militarizing their childhoods.

However, some Syrians showed nostalgia for those times.

== Gallery ==
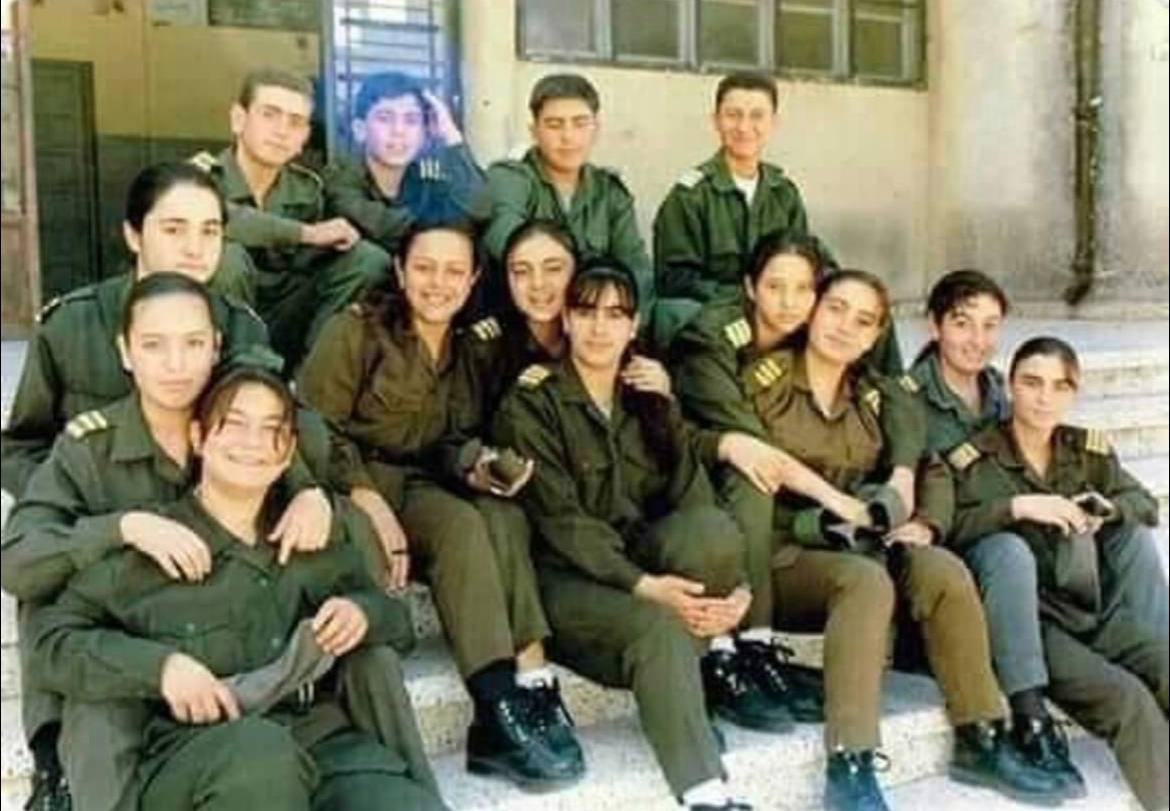
Middle school students

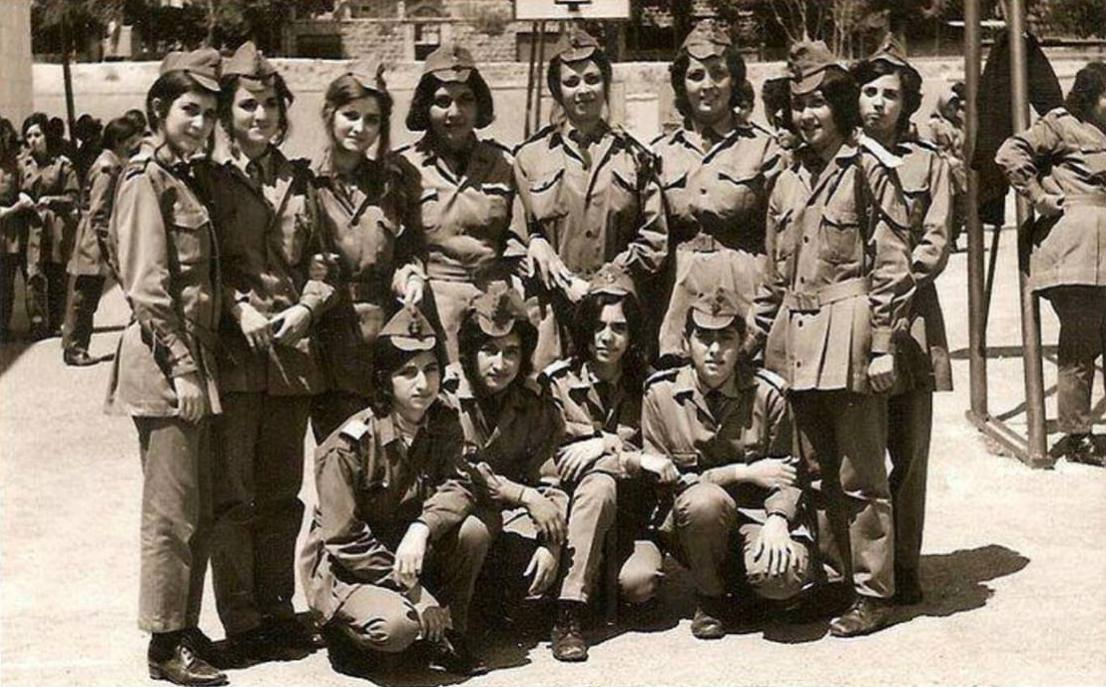
Girls school in Aleppo, 1975

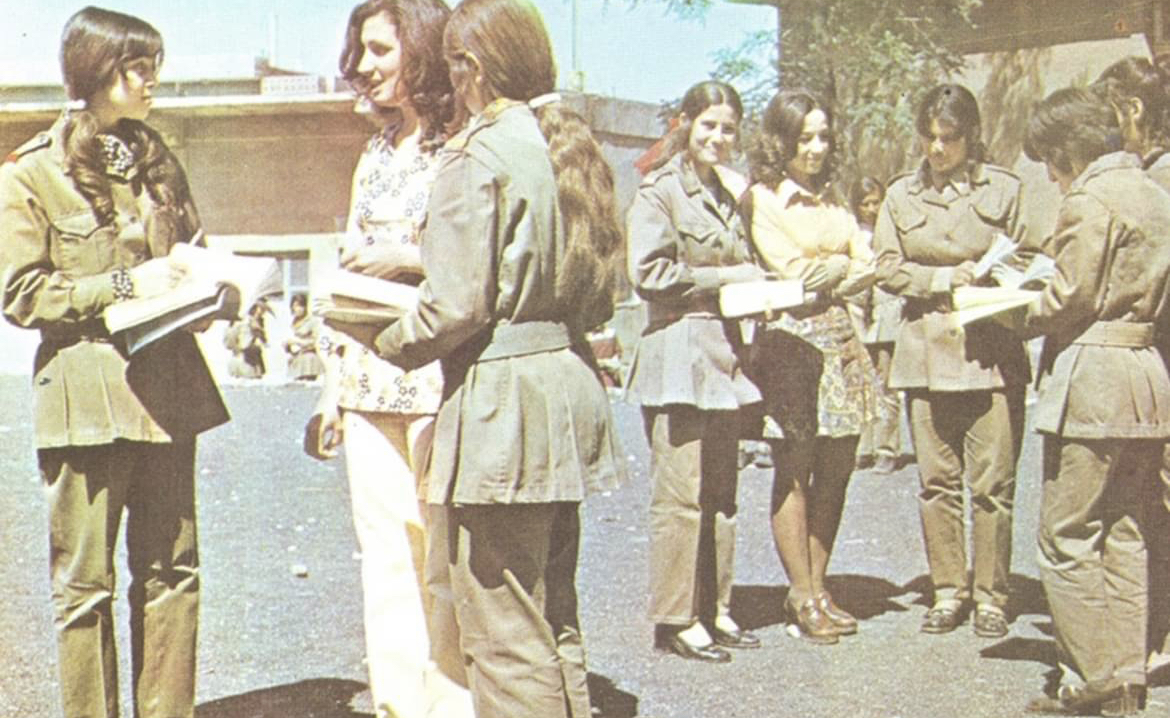
As-Suwayda, 1973

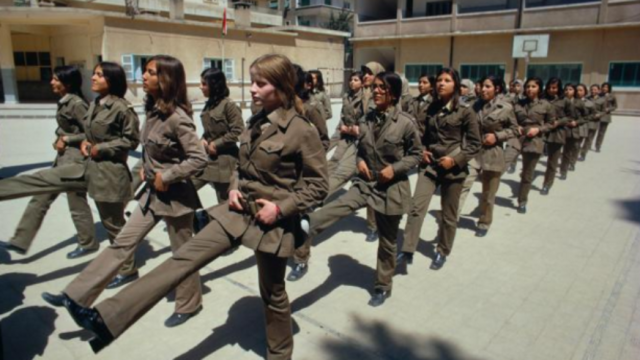
Marching at Futuwa class, 1973

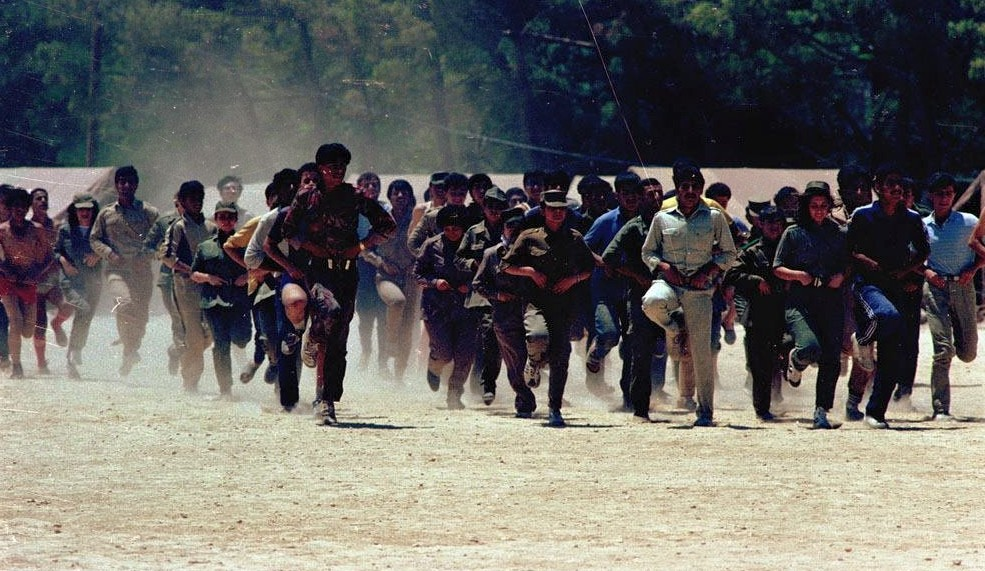
Revolutionary Youth Union camp in Aleppo, 1986

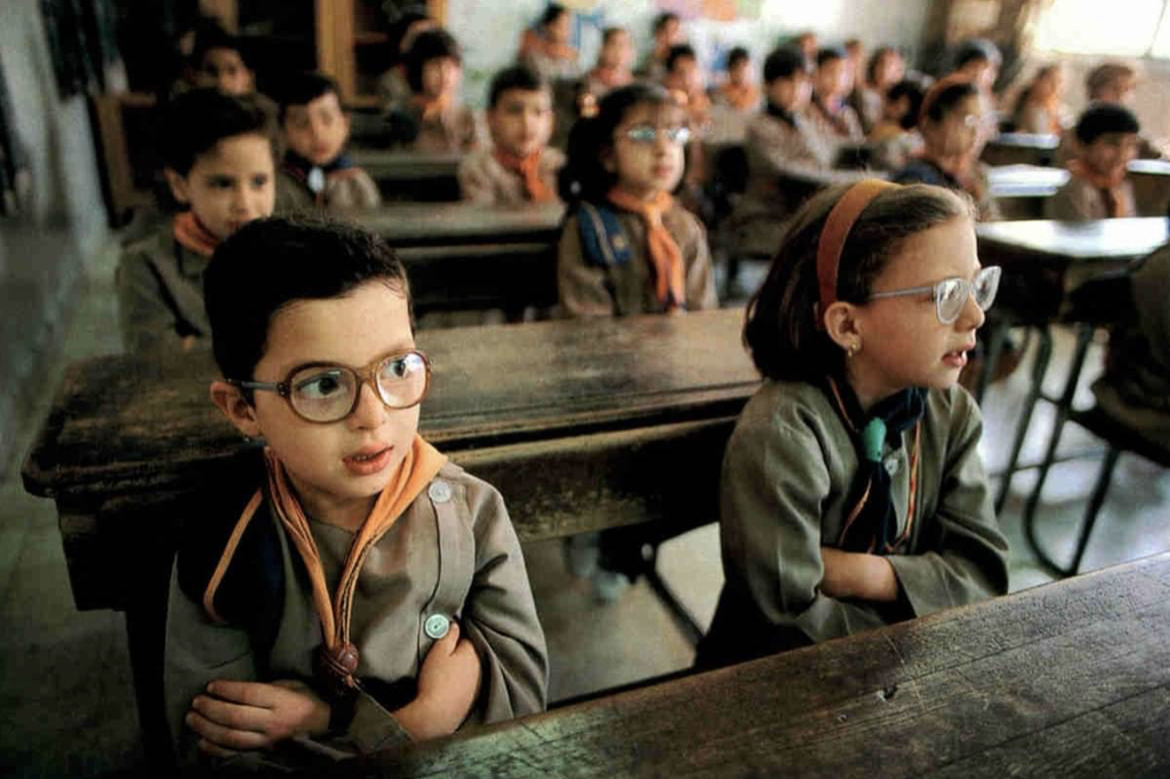
Junior school students in Al-Ba'ath Vanguard uniform

== See also ==
- Presidency of Hafez al-Assad
- Syrian Arab Armed Forces
- Assadist-Saddamist conflict
