= Health in Syria =

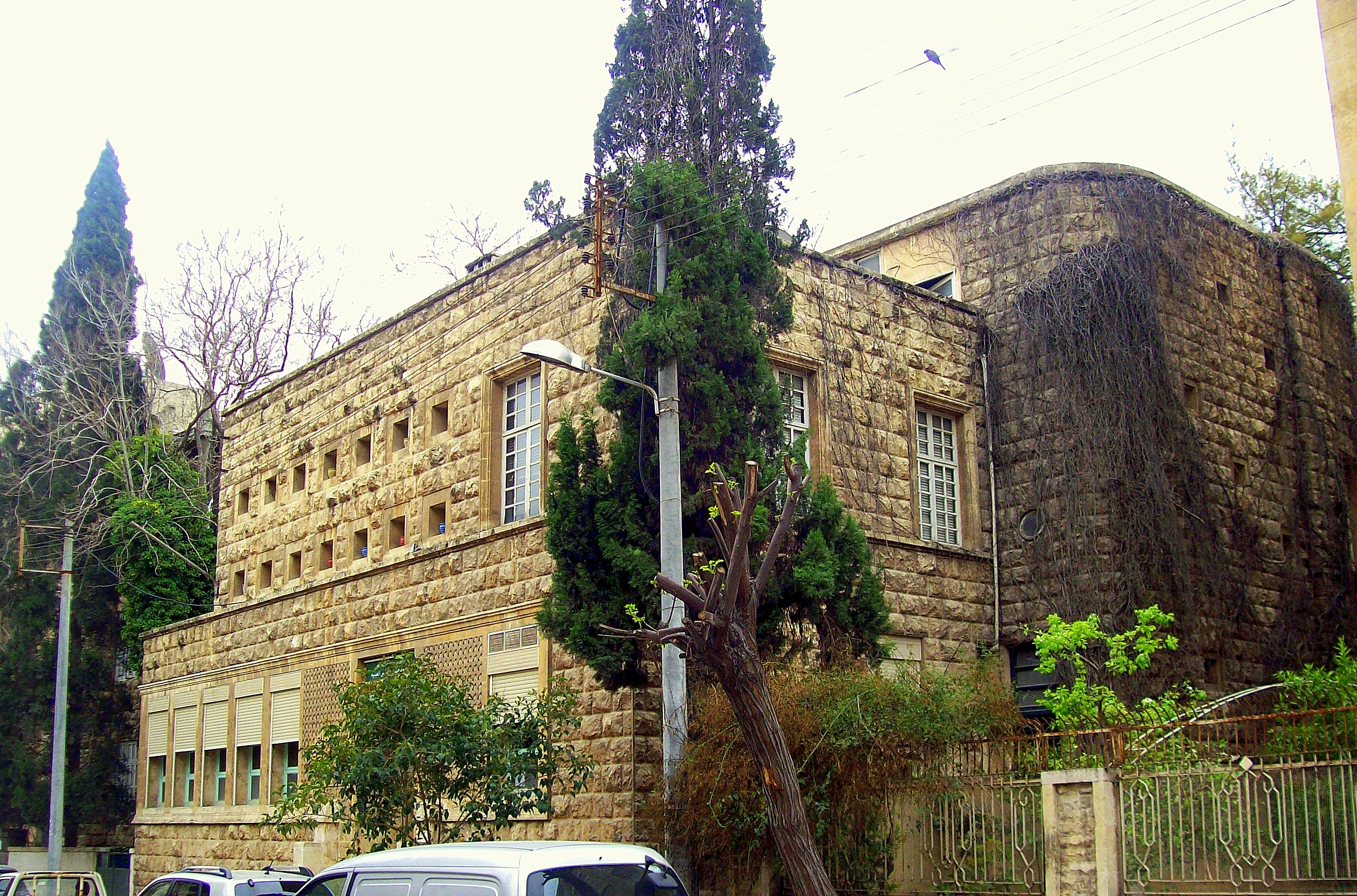
Robert Jebejian Ophthalmological Hospital in Aleppo, Syria, founded in 1952

Although emphasized by the country's ruling Baath Party and improving significantly in recent years, health in Syria has been declining due to the ongoing civil war. The war which has left 60% of the population food insecure and saw the collapse of the Syrian economy, the surging prices of basic needs, the plummeting of the Syrian pound, the destruction of many hospitals nationwide, the deterioration in the functionality of some medical equipment due to the lack of spare parts and maintenance, and shortages of drugs and medical supplies due to sanctions and corruption.

== Healthcare system ==
Syria’s health system is the responsibility of the Ministry of Health. The system is relatively decentralized and focuses on offering primary healthcare at three levels: village, district, and provincial. According to the World Health Organization (WHO), in 1990 Syria had 41 general hospitals (33 public, 8 private), 152 specialized hospitals (16 public, 136 private), 391 rural health centers, 151 urban health centers, 79 rural health units, and 49 specialized health centers; hospital beds totaled 13,164 (77 percent public, 23 percent private), or 11 beds per 10,000 inhabitants. The number of state hospital beds reportedly fell between 1995 and 2001, while the population had an 18 percent increase, but the opening of new hospitals in 2002 caused the number of hospital beds to double.

WHO reported that in 1989 Syria had a total of 10,114 physicians, 3,362 dentists, and 14,816 nurses and midwives; in 1995 the rate of health professionals per 10,000 inhabitants was 10.9 physicians, 5.6 dentists, and 21.2 nurses and midwives. Despite overall improvements, Syria’s health system exhibits significant regional disparities in the availability of healthcare, especially between urban and rural areas. The number of private hospitals and doctors increased by 41 percent between 1995 and 2001 as a result of growing demand and growing wealth in a small sector of society. Almost all private health facilities are located in large urban areas such as Damascus, Aleppo, Tartus, and Latakia. However, during the war, and as a result of almost 600 attacks on healthcare facilities, more than 50% of the country's health infrastructure was damaged or destroyed, while around 70% of health workers have left the country.

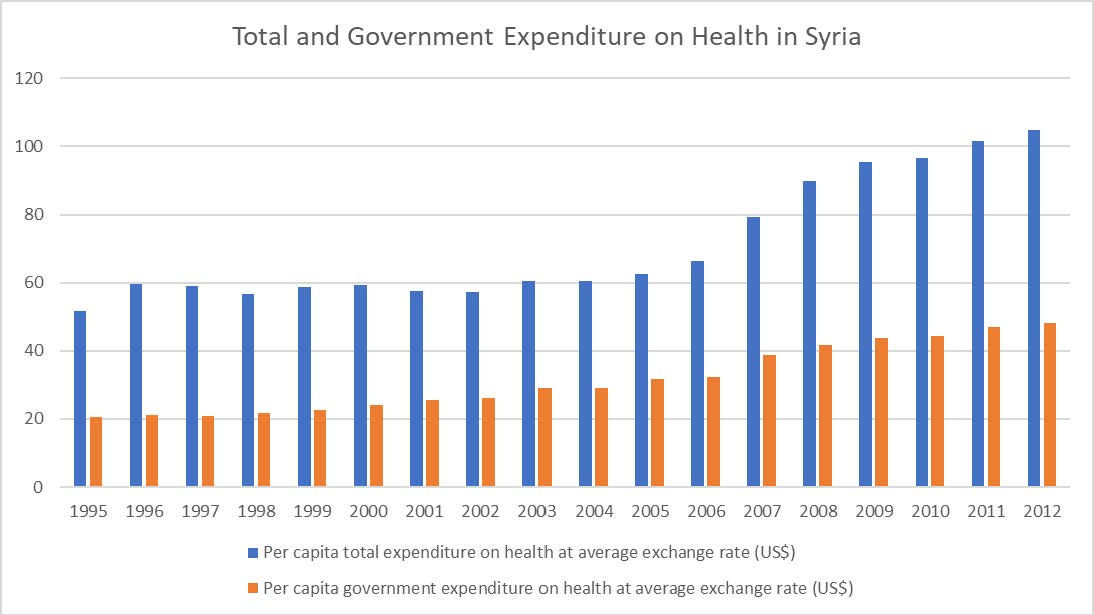
Total and Government per capita Expenditure on Health in Syria between 1995-2012

=== Healthcare financing ===
Out-of-pocket payments represent the leading source of healthcare financing in Syria. In 2008, out-of-pocket payments made up 61% of the total per capita expenditure on health in the country. The majority of these costs go to private healthcare providers. Despite the above-average health indicators, Syria's total expenditure on health is among the lowest in the region, and public healthcare facilities provide low-quality services and suffer from corruption. Additionally, The pooling function of the healthcare financing system is highly fragmented, and the country has not implemented national health insurance.

Total and Government per capita Expenditure on Health in Syria
Year	Per capita total expenditure on health at average exchange rate (US$)	Per capita government expenditure on health at average exchange rate (US$)
1995	51.7	20.5
1996	59.5	21.1
1997	59.1	20.9
1998	56.7	21.7
1999	58.8	22.5
2000	59.2	24
2001	57.7	25.5
2002	57.3	26.2
2003	60.4	29.2
2004	60.6	29.1
2005	62.6	31.6
2006	66.3	32.2
2007	79.4	38.9
2008	89.9	41.8
2009	95.4	43.9
2010	96.6	44.4
2011	101.7	47.1
2012	104.7	48.2

== Health Status ==
=== Population ===
In 2020, Syria's population was an estimated 17,500,657 decreasing from the pre-war population of 21,326,541 in 2010.

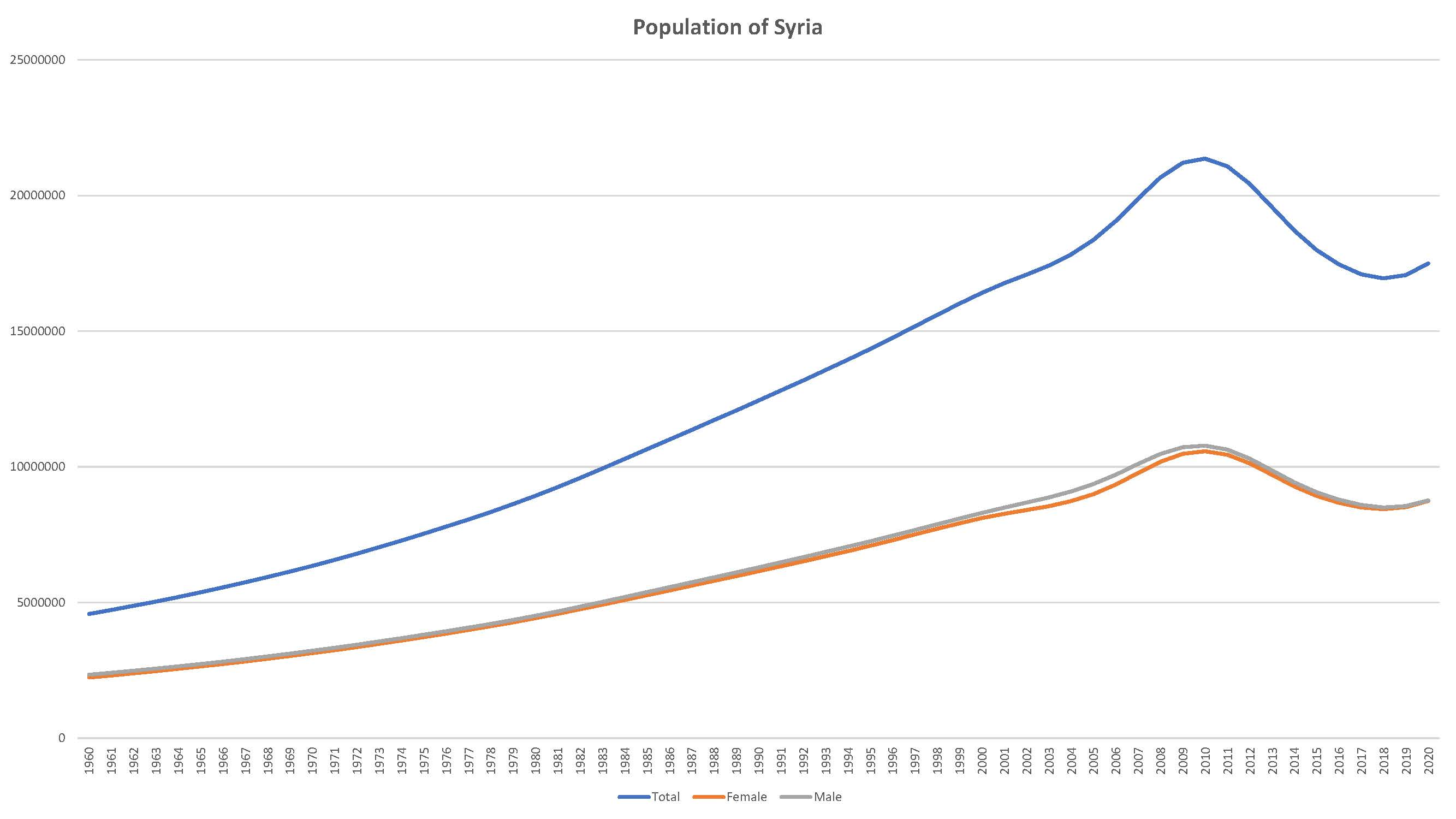
Population of Syria 1960-2020

Syria's Population between 1960-2020
Year	1960	1970	1980	1990	2000	2010	2015	2020
Total	4,573,514	6,350,544	8,930,776	12,446,168	16,410,847	21,362,541	17,997,411	17,500,657
Female	2,235,648	3,132,704	4,422,557	6,154,286	8,109,037	10,577,491	8,931,433	8,740,592
Male	2,337,866	3,217,840	4,,,508,219	6,291,882	8,301,810	10,785,050	9,065,978	8,760,065

=== Life expectancy at birth ===
In 2019, the average life expectancy at birth for Syrians was 72.7 years, 67.9 for males, and 78.1 for females, compared to the average life expectancy in 1960, which was roughly 52 years. The dependency ratio in 2020 was 54.5, while the median age was 24.3 in 2021.

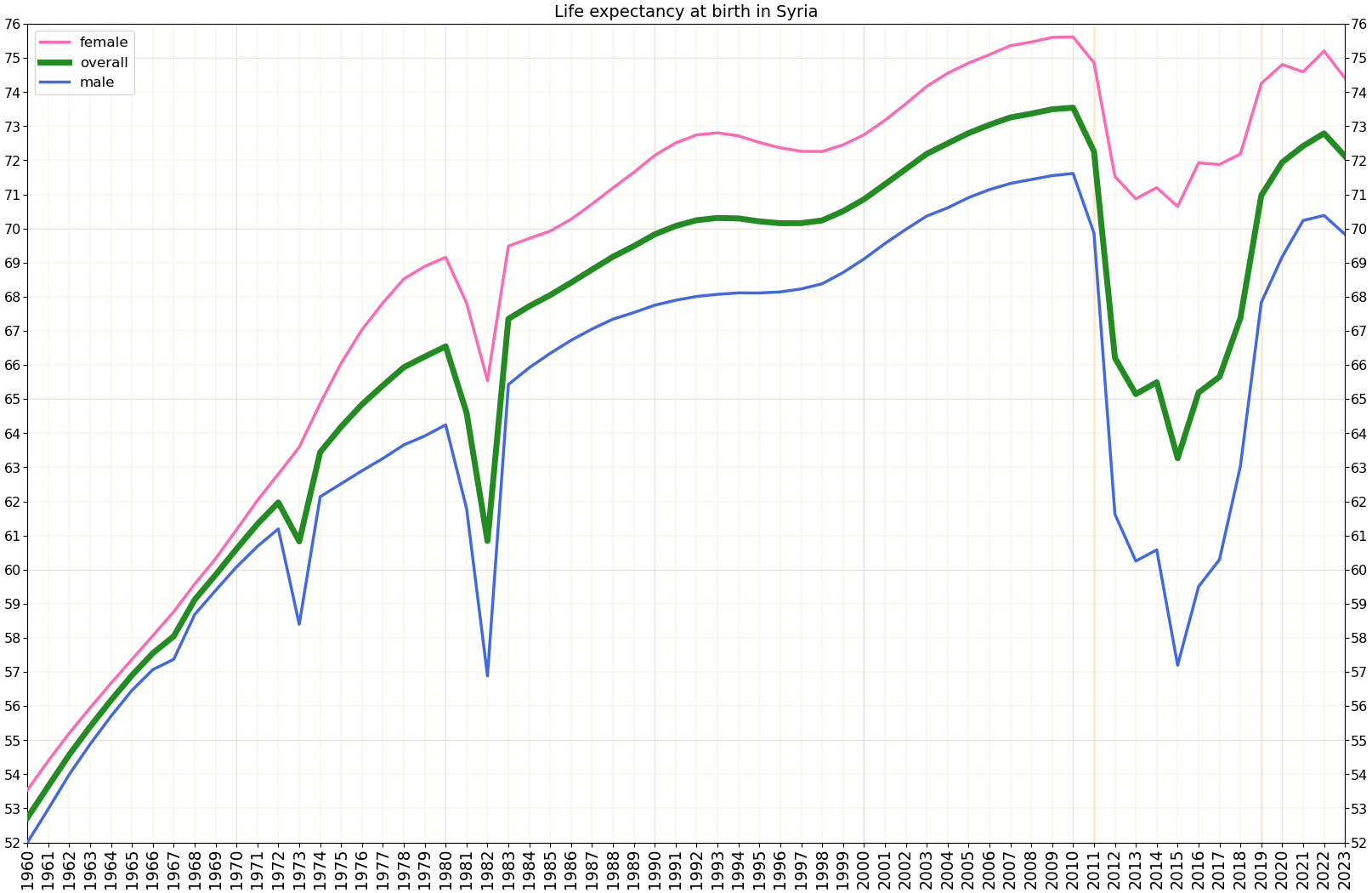
Life expectancy in Syria

Life Expectancy at Birth (Years)
Year	1960	1970	1980	1990	2000	2010	2015	2019
Total	51.971	58.814	65.774	70.553	73.11	72.108	69.908	72.697
Female	53.389	60.217	67.072	72.104	75.274	76.778	76.798	78.103
Male	50.671	57.513	64.548	69.074	71.034	68.113	64.019	67.941

== Health conditions and risk factors ==
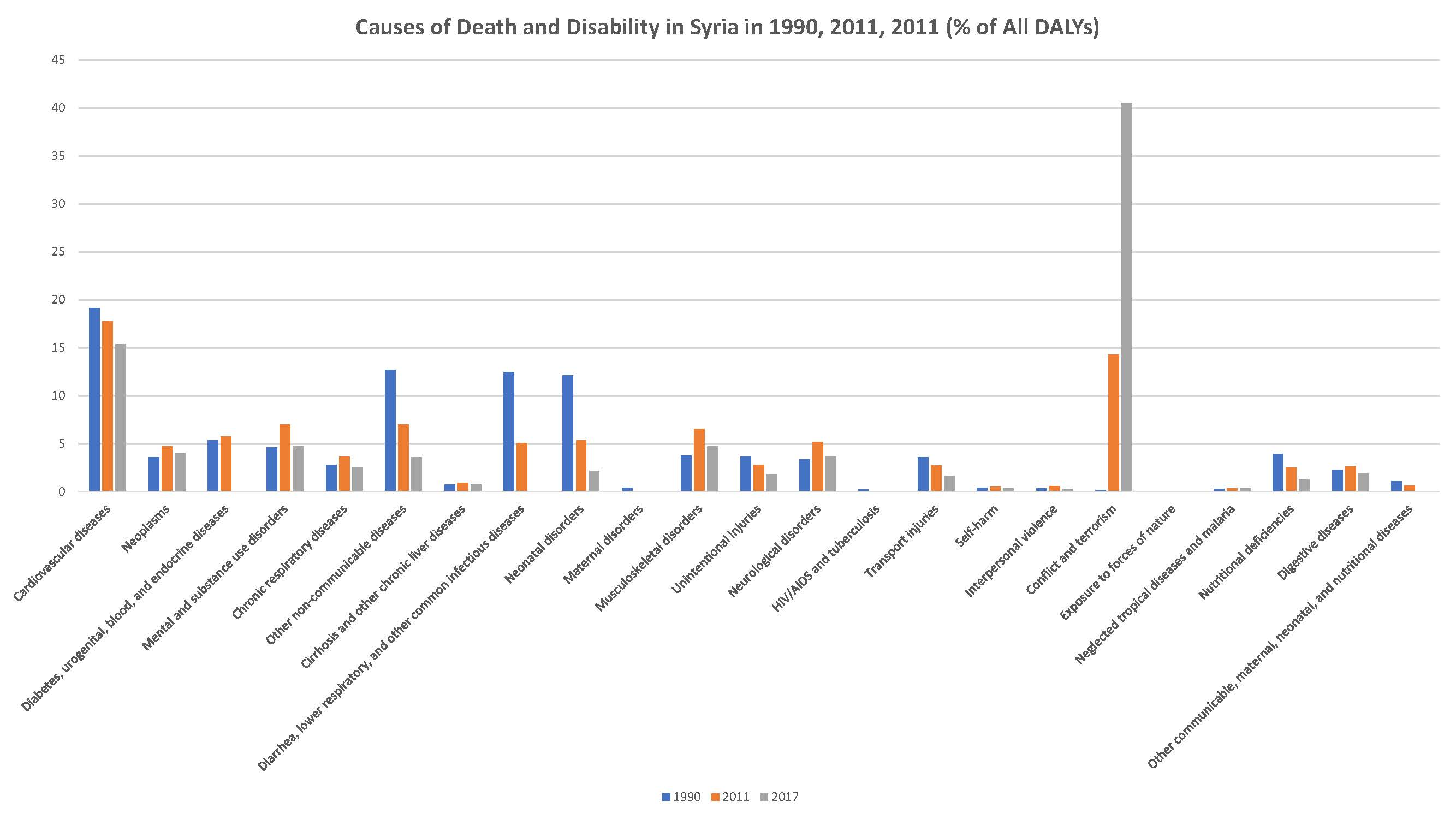
Causes of Death and Disability in Syria in 1990, 2011, 2017

Cardiovascular diseases accounted for the most deaths and disabilities in pre-war Syria. Nevertheless, conflict and terrorism were the number one cause of death and disability in 2017. Syria managed to reduce the percentage of DALYs lost to communicable, maternal, neonatal, and nutritional diseases from around 40% of all DALYs lost in 1990 to roughly 17% in 2010. This percentage was further lowered to around 7% in 2017, but that was mainly because of the increase of DALYs lost to the country's civil war.

Causes of Death and Disability in Syria in 1990, 2011, 2011 (% of All DALYs)
Year	Cardiovascular diseases	Neoplasms	Diabetes, urogenital, blood, and endocrine diseases	Mental and substance use disorders	Chronic respiratory diseases	Other non-communicable diseases	Cirrhosis and other chronic liver diseases	Diarrhea, lower respiratory, and other common infectious diseases	Neonatal disorders	Maternal disorders	Musculoskeletal disorders	Unintentional injuries	Neurological disorders	HIV/AIDS and tuberculosis	Transport injuries	Self-harm	Interpersonal violence	Conflict and terrorism	Exposure to forces of nature	Neglected tropical diseases and malaria	Nutritional deficiencies	Digestive diseases	Other communicable, maternal, neonatal, and nutritional diseases
1990	19.11864	3.58044	5.368794	4.641581	2.812922	12.6936	0.750872	12.4773	12.12277	0.440247	3.773375	3.679963	3.373416	0.229956	3.625845	0.427055	0.349298	0.186577	0	0.313882	3.968937	2.298612	1.124068
2011	17.76006	4.765824	5.751778	7.038619	3.658268	7.008002	0.947622	5.115167	5.387693	0.083137	6.563367	2.815909	5.205728	0.084889	2.731076	0.551346	0.569105	14.29787	0.002499	0.355808	2.513911	2.615348	0.625929
2017	15.38624	4.005797		4.77211	2.541676	3.619887	0.742698		2.192962	0.043307	4.723509	1.83489	3.72031		1.684412	0.361248	0.333347	40.54578	0.001358	0.369481	1.297491	1.900713	

=== Child and maternal health ===
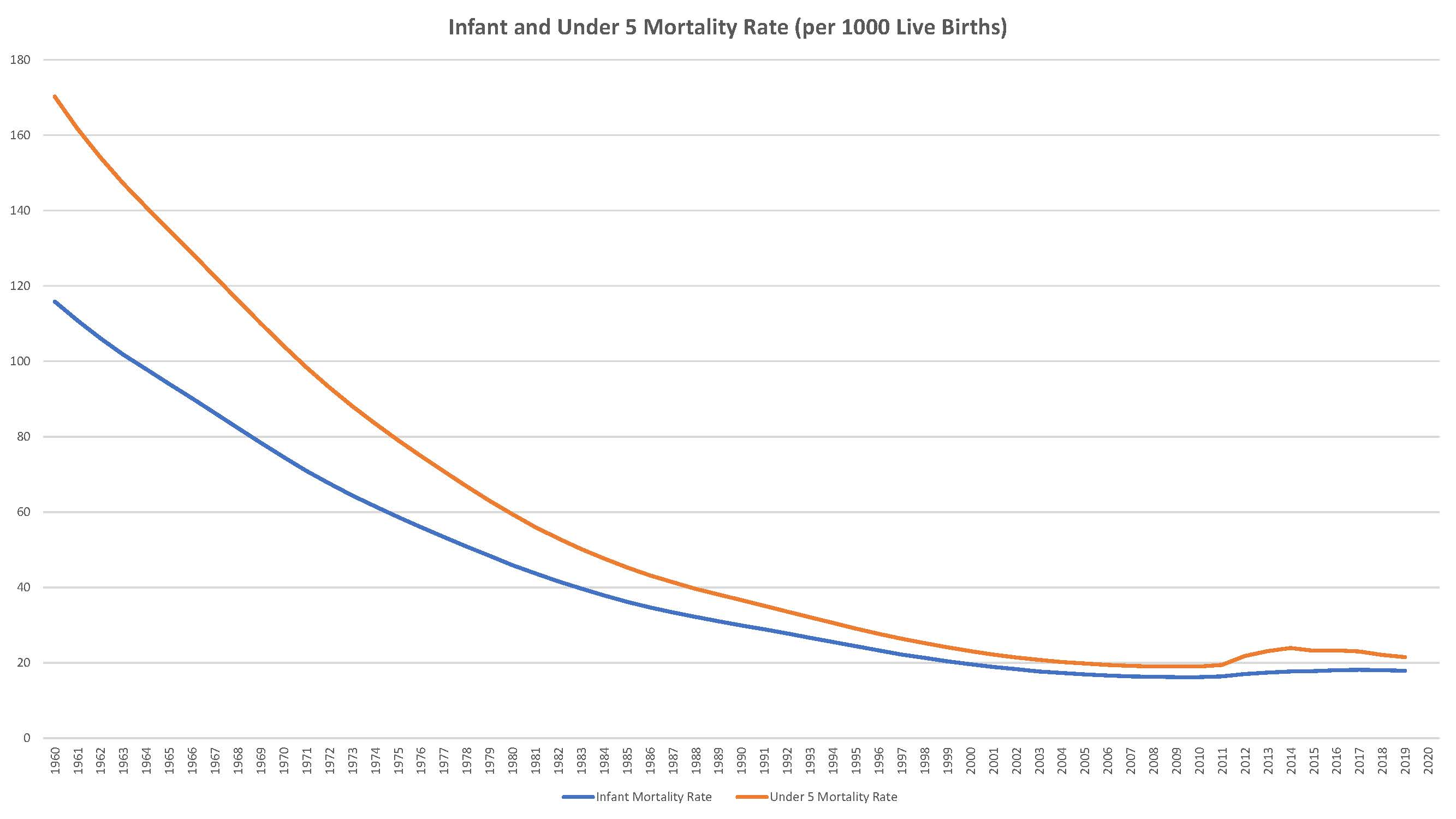
Infant and Under-5 Mortality Rate in Syria 1960-2019

==== Child health ====
In 2019, the Infant mortality rate in Syria was at 17.9, which is higher than the pre-war number, but less than the world's average of 28.2. While the under-5 mortality rate was at 21.5 deaths also lower than the global average of 37.7. In 2009, low birth weight newborns accounted for 10% of all births.

Infant and Under-5 Mortality Rate (per 1000 Live Births)
Year	1960	1970	1980	1990	2010	2015	2019
Infant Mortality Rate	115.9	74.6	45.9	29.9	16.2	17.8	17.9
Under 5 Mortality Rate	170.3	104.1	59.4	36.6	19	23.2	21.5

==== Maternal health ====
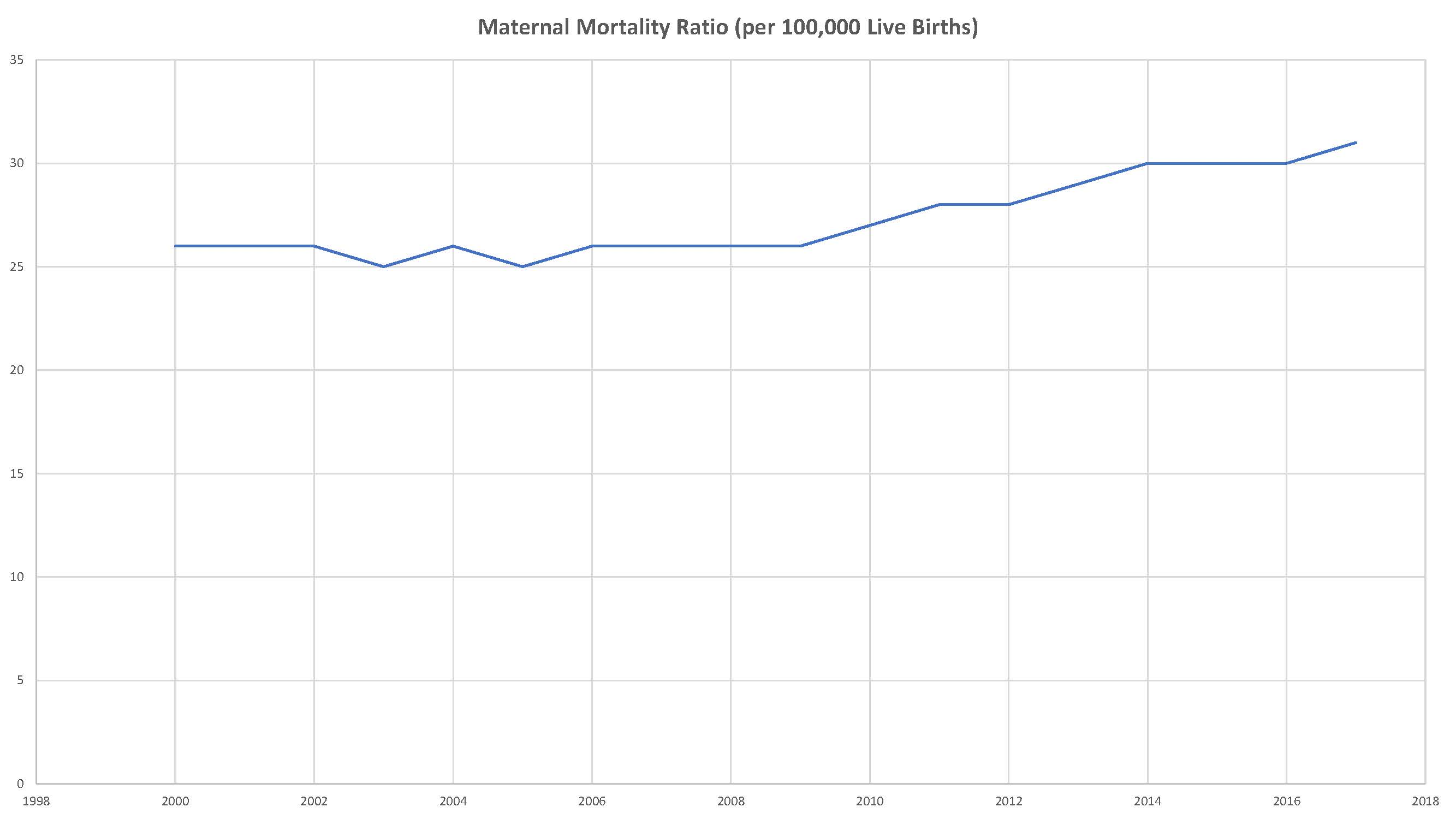
Maternal Mortality Ratio in Syria 2000-2017

Since most births before the war were attended by skilled health workers (96.2%), the Maternal Mortality Ratio was as low as 26 maternal deaths per 100,000 live births in 2009 when the world's average was 257. During the war, more pregnant women did not receive proper maternal care because of safety, accessibility and economic reasons. The numbers increased dramatically after the war reaching 31 maternal deaths in 2017.

=== Obesity ===
In 2017, the adult prevalence rate for obesity was 27.8, and in 2009 10% of children under 5 were obese. In 2016, Syria ranked 35th in the list of countries by body mass index, according to the World Health Organization data on Prevalence of Obesity, published in 2017.

=== Sanitation ===
In 2015, 95.7% of the population had access to sanitation and 90.1% of the population had access to clean water. Although water pollution poses a threat to the availability of clean water and sanitation, as analyses of water samples for ammonia, suspended solids and BOD in Aleppo's Quweiq River and the lower part of the Orontes exceeded the allowable limits. In the coastal region, wells used for drinking purposes are contaminated with high concentrations of nitrates and ammonia because of sewage discharge and use of fertilizers, as well as seawater intrusion into the fresh groundwater aquifers.

=== Smoking ===
Smoking in Syria is steadily increasing in popularity amongst Syrians, mainly in the forms of cigarettes or Narghiles. Syrians collectively spend about $600 million per year on tobacco consumption. In 2010, 20% of women and 60% of men smoke and 98% of the overall population is affected by passive smoking. Despite the assumption that smoking, specifically the narghile, is embedded in Syrian culture, this phenomenon has only recently become widespread.

Despite this, whatsoever, Smoking in Syria has been banned inside cafes (hookah bars), restaurants and other public spaces by a presidential decree which was issued on 12 October 2009 which went into effect on 21 April 2010. Syria was the first Arab country to introduce such a ban. The decree also outlaws smoking in schools, universities, health centers, sports halls, cinemas and theaters and on public transport. The restrictions include the narghile. According to the official Syrian Arab News Agency, fines for violating the ban range from LS 500 to LS 100,000 (US$11 to $2,169).

People under the age of 18 are not allowed to buy tobacco in Syria.

== See also ==
- Smoking in Syria
- Women's health in Syria
