= Al-Ta'addudiyya Al-Iqtisadiyya =

Al-Ta`addudiyya Al-Iqtisadiyya
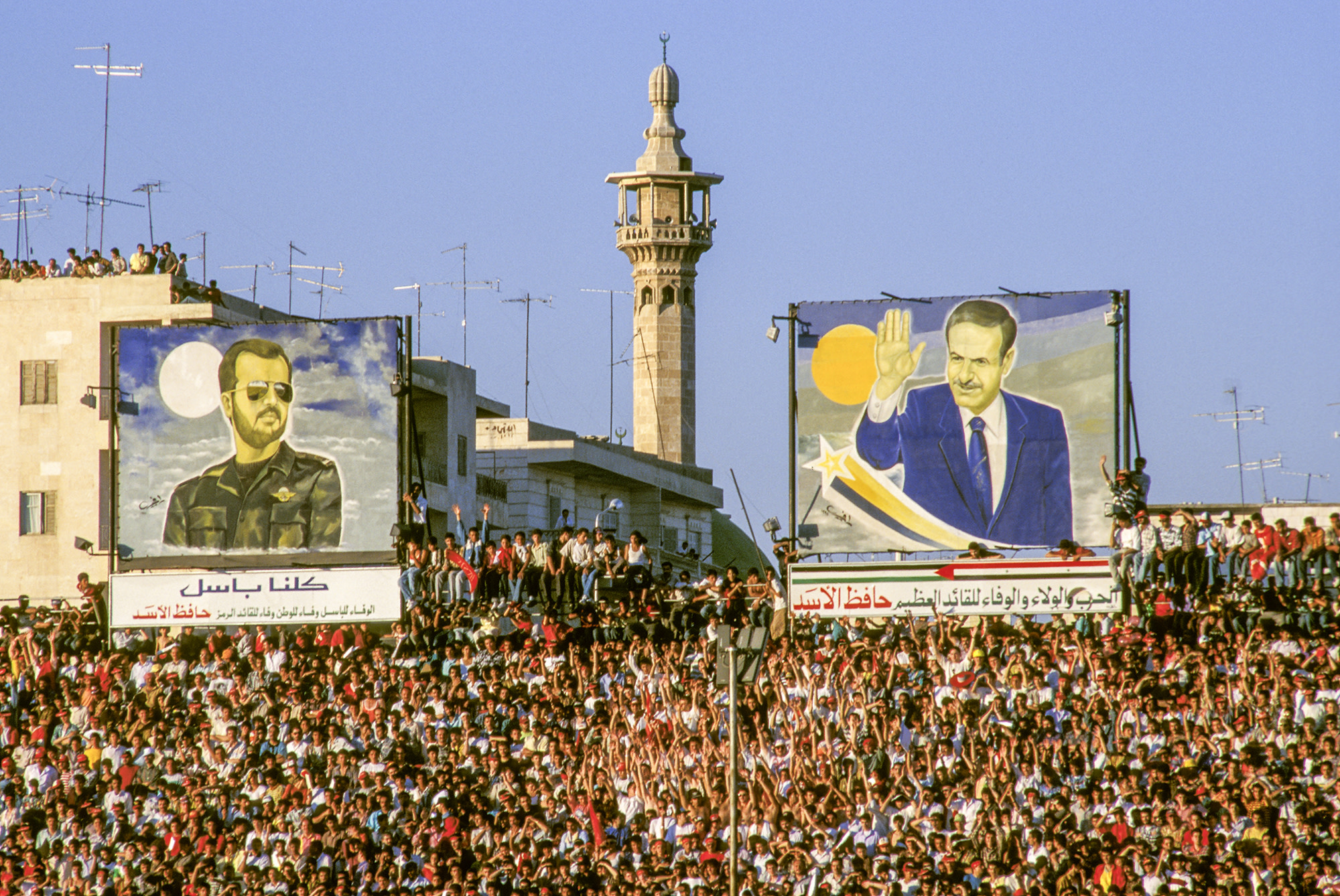
- Portraits of Syrian president Hafez al-Assad (r) and his eldest son Bassel, who was being groomed as a successor and who was the main face of the reforms, 1991
- Date: 1991 – 2001
- Location: Ba'athist Syria
- Cause: Economic troubles; 1986 Currency crisis; the fall of world socialism; Dissolution of the Soviet Union
- Motive: Development of the economy; Attracting new investments
- Outcome: Shift away from a centralized command economy; Abandonment of socialism with the Bashar al-Assad's rise to power

Al-Ta`addudiyya Al-Iqtisadiyya (lit. "Economic pluralism"), also called Al-Ta'addudiyya Al-Siyyasiyya (lit. "Political pluralism"), was a government reformist campaign and period of large-scale liberal economic reforms in Ba'athist Syria in the 1990s. Al-Ta`addudiyya Al-Iqtisadiyya marked Syria's departure from the centralized and planned economy that had existed in Syria continuously since 1963. The campaign should not be confused with Ta'addudiyya, a broader term that encompasses not only economic but also political changes in Syria that began in the 1970s. This term was used quite frequently by President Hafez al-Assad in his speeches. In essence, this policy lasted until 2001, after which it was replaced by more radical liberal economic reforms of Bashar al-Assad.

== Background ==
Since 1970, General Hafez al-Assad has ruled Syria continuously. After coming to power, he launched an ambitious series of reforms known as the Corrective Movement program. As part of the Corrective Movement, he also adopted the Infiraj and Ta'addudiyya policies, aimed at limited liberalization of Syria to attract foreign capital for economic development.

However, despite the slogans about political and economic relaxation, Syria remained a centralized military dictatorship, whose command economy was built partly on the Soviet model. Although the 1970s were relatively successful in terms of comprehensive development, economic problems and a clear shortage of capital and private investment became evident in the 1980s. The Fifth (1981-1985) and Sixth Five-Year Plans (1986-1990) failed to achieve most of their goals, and austerity policies were introduced in the mid-1980s. The government made several attempts to attract even more private capital, for example by reintroducing the infiraj policy in 1986 and starting a gradual abolition of its command economy. Liberal economic reforms themselves began earlier than they were officially proclaimed - the impetus for them was the economic crisis of 1986, which is where they began. However, these measures were often insufficient and clashed with other measures aimed at subordinating private capital to the state.

== Implementation ==
In 1991, rigged presidential elections were held in Syria, in which Hafez al-Assad won, being, as always, the only candidate. Almost immediately after the elections, at the same year, the beginning of large-scale political and economic relaxations was announced, which became known as Al-Ta`addudiyya Al-Iqtisadiyya. Assad devoted much of his 1991 inauguration speech to this campaign of economic pluralism. The policy called for further merging of the private and public sectors. The totalitarian political control that had formed in the 1980s began to weaken as the threat of new Islamist uprisings in Syria no longer abated. Moreover, the Hafez al-Assad regime learned a lesson from the fall of communist dictatorships around the world, managing to adapt in time to the new pace of global politics.

Liberalization was characterized by a gradual reduction in state support, the abolition of subsidies, price liberalization, and so on: that continued until 2010. While policy has finally recognized the importance of the private sector for the country's development, the state sector remains the dominant sector in the Syrian economy. One of the most significant actions of the program was the adoption of Law No. 10 in 1991, which was aimed at providing greater incentives for foreign investment in those sectors of the economy that had previously been subject to complete state monopoly. Statements related to this term could be heard in almost every speech or official government document that even slightly touched on economic development.

By the end of the 1990s, civil forums began to form where politics could be discussed relatively freely and attempts were made to establish a dialogue with the president. As part of this policy, the government has also carefully attempted to expand the political system in Syria, for example by opening the government and parliament to the potential entry of independent political groups that are not part of the National Progressive Front (official coalition of leftist organizations led by the Ba'ath Party). Pluralist reforms also made it harder for anti-Ba'athist groups like the regional Muslim Brotherhood to recruit supporters - although the government's control over the population has weakened, its support has also increased for that same reason.

== Aftermath ==
Thanks to this policy, the private sector was able to free itself from some of the government-imposed restrictions and gain many new opportunities, ultimately growing greatly. However, even at this time, the private sector was essentially under the strong influence of the Syrian elite, including al-Jama'a. As a manager at the Ministry of Industry noted in an interview, the government has allowed the private sector to grow, but will not help it become too big to be easily controlled. The government also did not abandon the system of five-year economic planning, although it no longer sought to implement new five-year plans in the same way as it had sought to do so previously. During this period, the elite, known as the "New Class" (or al-tabaqa al-jadida), was finally able to form. This campaign has become, according to some observers, an opportunity to legitimize the private sector, which is largely subordinate to businessmen close to the government. Eventually, Bashar al-Assad finally abandoned the idea of building socialism (although the party continued to conduct socialist propaganda), and in 2005 he officially announced Syria's transition to a "social market economy."
