= Five-Year Plan for Deregulation =

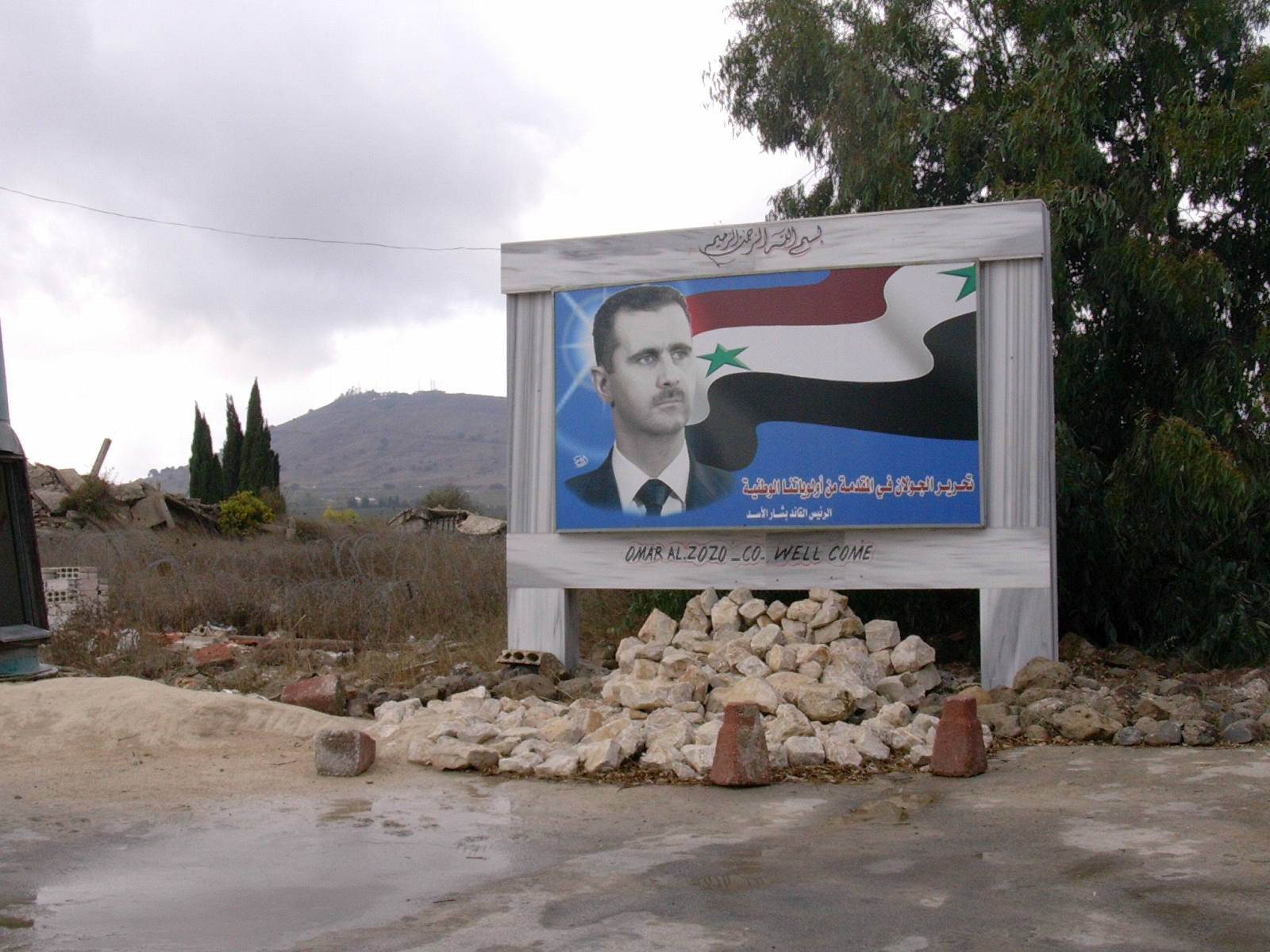
A portrait of President Bashar al-Assad at the Syrian-Israeli border in the Golan Heights, 2006

The Five-Year Plan for Deregulation, most commonly known as the Tenth Five-Year Plan or just 10th FYP was the jubilee and last fully implemented five-year plan in Ba'athist Syria, which ran from 2006 to 2010. The plan, in addition to radical liberal changes to the economy, became the first in a series of "Perspective Plans" developed by the government over a 25-year period. The plan marked Syria's entry into a new, albeit brief, phase of modernization.

== Background ==
Syria has used a system of five-year plans continuously since 1960 and was officially known as Five-year Plans for Economic Expansion and the Advancement of Society. In 2000, after the death of Hafez al-Assad, his son Bashar took power and set a course for economic reform. This was reflected in the planning and implementation of the Ninth Five-Year Plan (2001-2005). In 2005, Bashar announced Syria's transition to a social market economy. Between 2000 and 2007, GDP and GDP per capita grew by 5 and 2 percent, respectively.

== Goals ==
The Tenth Five-Year Plan was radically different from the plans of the Hafez al-Assad era: instead of strengthening central planning, expanding the public sector at the expense of the private sector, and attempting to achieve complete autarky from the rest of the world, it set itself the goal of significantly expanding interaction with global markets and strengthening the private sector. The State Planning Commission (the body responsible for formulating five-year plans in Syria) stated that the basis of the new plan is a combination of economic and social development. The government also planned to develop institutions to monitor and control the plan's progress. Plan was adopted in May 2006.

=== Globalization and liberalization ===
The Tenth Five-Year Plan set the goal of moving Syria toward full integration into the global economy by 2020, gaining influence in global markets, and achieving high economic competitiveness. The private sector was to play a key role in this planned success. The plan had goals calculated for a total of 10–15 years, since the government recognized the impossibility of achieving good results in five years. The plan also noted that such radical reforms could devastate the lives of some vulnerable segments of the population, and therefore obligated the government to ensure social security for these groups. It also planned to eliminate subsidies and dismantle state monopolies. As noted in the UN report, "Syria will have become a country where freedom of expression, democracy, pluralism and the rule of law prevail."

=== Planned development ===
Annual economic growth was planned at 5-7 percent of GDP. The priority sectors was industry, energy, agriculture, tourism, safe water, health, education, and women rights. It also called for decentralization of governance to benefit regional development planning. The plan document had several chapters - lessons learned from previous five-year plans, goals for the next 10–15 years, a 25-year development perspective, and simply mentioning goals for these 5 years. 20 percent of the plan's investments were directed toward transport development. The Tenth Five-Year Plan projected investments of 34 billion US dollars or 1,800 billion Syrian pounds.

== Implementation ==
Syria has expanded cooperation with the UN. The organization was supposed to help Syria restructure state-owned enterprises, organizations, and banks. In 2006-2007, the government developed the so-called Perspective Plans for the next 25 years. The plan introduced into the economic concept a number of concepts inherent in the capitalist economic model. The commercial and private sectors received more privileges and opportunities for doing business.

The State Planning Commission itself was seriously restructured, and its personnel, from ordinary workers to senior managers, was renewed, and its functions changed from centralized to “indicative” planning. The SPC, which had previously played a major role in controlling Syria's centralized and planned economy, now set goals of economic liberalization and decentralization. The role of government has shifted from managing economic development to organizing it for decentralized control.

During this plan, Syria also announced the launch of a very ambitious program of expansion and infrastructure renovation, including with the aim of regaining its ancient role as a trading hub for the entire region. The government removed the state monopoly, abolished price regulation and licensed private banks.

== Aftermath ==
In 2010, the government released a report on the plan, stating that its main achievement was the modernization of economic management and the transition from state control to a market-based economy.

During the Tenth Plan, Syria faced a severe drought (2006-2011), which led to a decline in agriculture and a sharp increase in peasant migration to cities—a long-standing problem in Syria. The government provided subsidies and attempted to help farmers protect their crops and livestock, but this failed to prevent the crisis. Syria has lost nearly half (40 percent) its rural workforce. An estimated 800,000 people have lost all means of livelihood as a result of the drought. In a number of planned indicators, the plan did not achieve the goals it set: the level of poverty among the population increased, and external investments turned out to be quite low.

== See also ==
- Fourth Five-Year Plan of Ba'athist Syria (1976–1980)
- Fifth Five-Year Plan of Ba'athist Syria
- Sixth Five-Year Plan of Ba'athist Syria
