= Sixth Five-Year Plan of Ba'athist Syria =

Development plan in Syria (1986–1990)

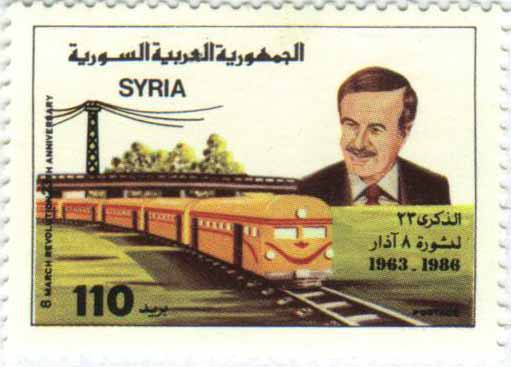
Postage stamp commemorating the 23rd anniversary of the Ba'ath Party's rise to power, 1986. It depicts portrait of a president Hafez al-Assad.

Sixth Five-Year Development Plan was adopted by the government of the Ba'athist Syria in 1986 and was in effect until 1990. The plan was based on demands made at the Ba'ath Party's Eighth Regional Congress in January 1985, namely, accelerating the militarization process. The plan had rather weak results, even compared to its predecessor – it coincided with the introduction of austerity policies in 1986 which lasted until the mid-1990s.

== Background ==
=== Fifth Five-Year Plan ===
The Fifth Five-Year Plan ran from 1981 to 1985 and had rather poor results, far below those predicted. Instead of the planned growth of 44.7 percent, real GDP only fell during this period. Instead of the planned 8.9 percent annual investment growth, they grew by an average of only 2.9 percent, and government spending grew annually by 9 percent (instead of the planned 6.4). A number of economic sectors have failed to reach even close to the level of development originally planned, although electricity production and manufacturing still increased. Problems with economic development were also linked to excessive military spending – in 1984, 55 percent of the entire annual budget went to defense.

=== Eighth Regional Congress ===
The eighth (and last in the Hafez al-Assad era) regional congress was held in January 1985.

The main topic of discussion at the congress was military spending and the level of militarization: both were deemed insufficient. Therefore, members of congress discussed how to expand Syria's militarization and increase military spending. Ultimately, a decision was made to cut spending on all other sectors of the economy and social development, and to use all savings for even greater arms purchases.

== Goals and implementation ==
By that time, despite the centralization of political and economic governance, the Syrian government had to increasingly rely on private companies and their investments as a means of economic development. From 1985 onwards, the government launched an intensified liberalisation campaign to attract even greater private sector investment into the economy and the Sixth Plan.

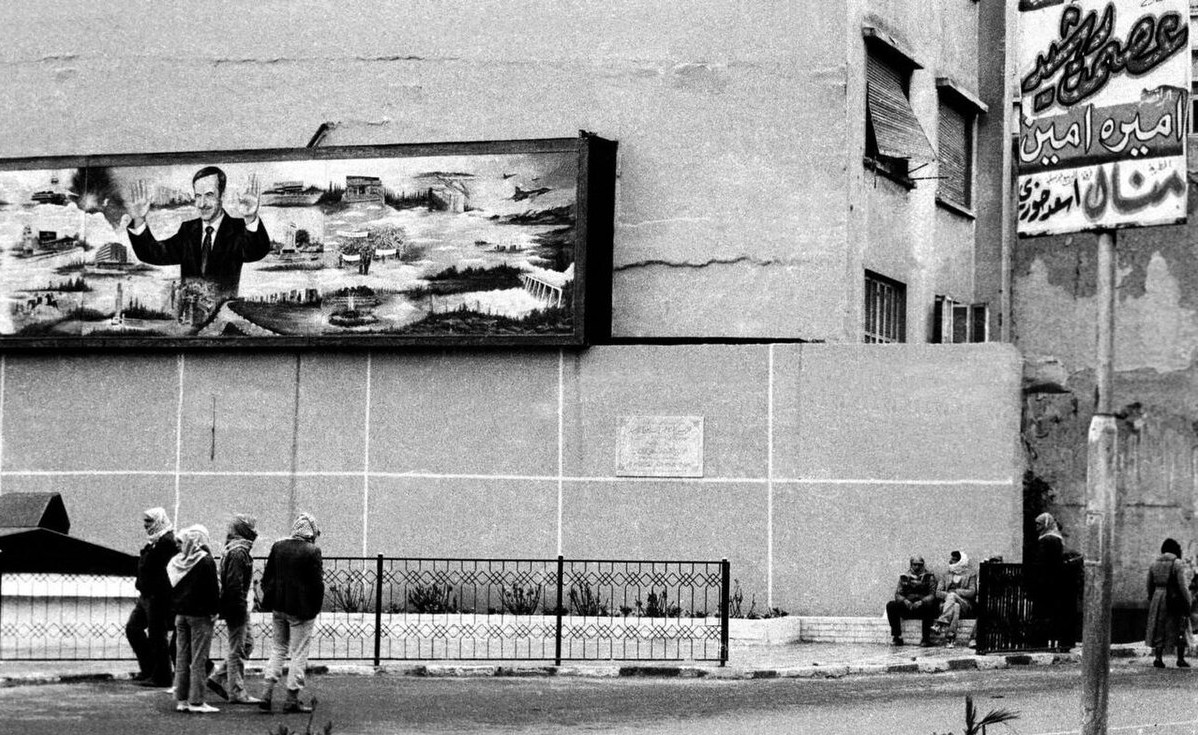
Damascus in 1986

Syria had already been facing serious economic difficulties, and as a result, the publication of the details of the sixth five-year plan was significantly delayed. Even by April 1987, information about the plan was still unknown to anyone outside the Syrian government. Like the fifth plan, the sixth focused on completing projects already underway, although not completely excluding the construction of new ones: for example, the plan called for the construction of a number of new dams (including the Tishrin Dam on the Euphrates river). Particular attention, as before, was paid to the agricultural and agro-industrial sectors. The goal was also to increase the production and export of phosphates and oil. Projected investments were only slightly higher than the 101.5 billion Syrian pounds projected in the previous plan. The distribution of these investments by sector also remained largely unchanged: the agricultural sector was expected to receive 18.9 percent of all investments (2 percent more than in the previous plan), while industry received 13.7 percent (1.5 percent more).

The Syrian pound was falling sharply against the dollar: in 1986, inflation was 36 percent, and in 1987 it was already 60. So in order to stop inflation, in September 1986 the government passed Law No. 24, which, in addition to the long-standing Economic Sanctions Law, introduced strict penalties for smuggling national currency and prohibited transactions with foreign currency.

The Sixth Five-Year Plan failed to achieve its goals and remained essentially unfinished. The government was no longer trying so hard to achieve the goals set by the plan. For example, the Tishrin Dam, which was planned to be built during this period (1986-1990), began construction only in 1991 and was completed in 1999.

== Aftermath ==
The plan was largely a failure due to the austerity measures introduced simultaneously and the deteriorating economic situation overall. The subsequent, seventh, five-year plan produced even weaker results than the sixth, but became yet another symbol of Syria's departure from centralized economic planning.

== See also ==
- Fourth Five-Year Plan of Ba'athist Syria
- Corrective Movement (Syria)
