= 8th Regional Congress of the Syrian Ba'ath Party =

8th Regional Congress of the Ba'ath Party المؤتمر الإقليمي الثامن لحزب البعث
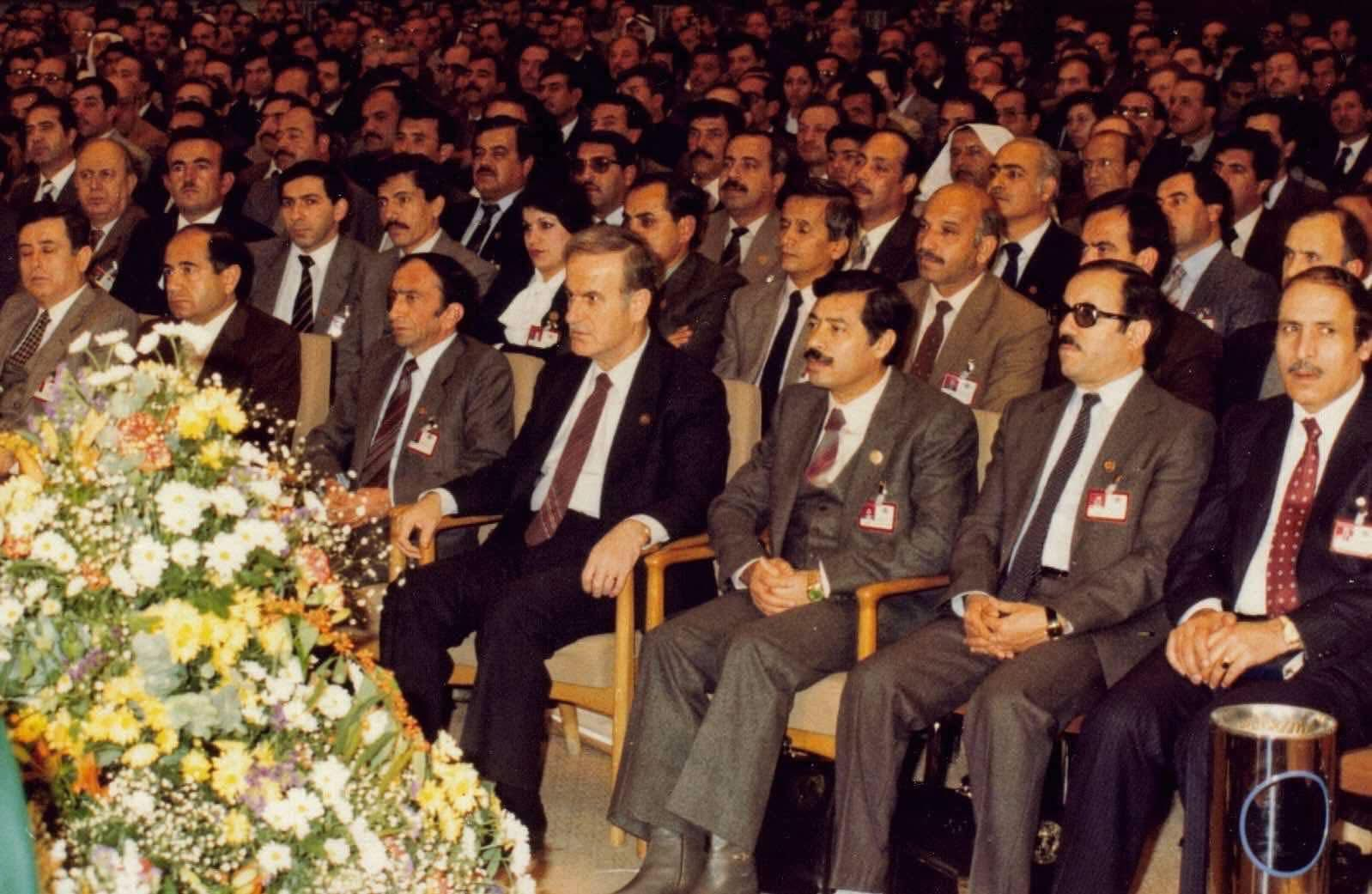
- Congress delegates. In the first row from the right: Mahmoud Al-Zoubi, Tewfik Saleh, Fayez al-Nasser, Hafez al-Assad (president), Abdul Rauf al-Kasm, Hikmat al-Shihabi, Abdul Halim Khaddam.
- Begins: January 5, 1985
- Ends: January 20, 1985
- Locations: People's Palace of Syria, Damascus
- Previous event: 7th Regional Congress of the Syrian Ba'ath Party (1980)
- Next event: 9th Regional Congress of the Syrian Ba'ath Party (2000)
- Participants: 771 representatives
- Major events: Election held to form the new Central Committee of the Arab Socialist Ba'ath Party and the new Regional Command
- Leader: Hafez al-Assad (Regional Secretary of the Regional Command of the Syrian Regional Branch)

8th Regional Congress (Arabic: المؤتمر الإقليمي الثامن, romanized: Al-Mutamar al'iiqlimiu al-Thaamin) was the last Regional Congress of the Syrian Ba'ath Party command under Hafez al-Assad's presidency and occurred from January 5 to January 20, 1985. The congress was held in the People's Palace and was attended by 771 delegates and was even attended by Rifaat al-Assad, who was exiled from Syria in mid-1984 after an attempted coup (but he was not given any opportunity to speak at the congress).

== Preparation ==
=== Central Committee's report ===
The report to Congress, prepared by the Central Committee, emphasized the need to modernize the agricultural sector, increase productivity levels, and strengthen Syria's economic model as a whole. By that time, Syria was already facing a growing shortage of consumer and producer goods, such as (in some areas) bread or building materials, and its production in the textile industry had declined. The fifth five-year plan (1981-1985) proved to be largely unsuccessful. As early as 1986, a policy of austerity was announced.

In the same report, the period of the Islamist uprising was referred to as a period of conspiracy against the region and the revolution (it is not entirely clear which specific revolution was meant: the March 8 Revolution or the Corrective Revolution) and was described as one of the most difficult periods in Syrian history.

== Congress ==
Regional Congresses in Syria were key moments in shaping the country's state policy and governance.

The main topics for discussion at the Congress had already been predetermined in December 1984 by the Central Committee of the Ba'ath Party at a meeting. The 771 delegates of the congress included peasants, workers, military personnel, members of the special services, and members of the Jama'a group. In addition to local party delegates, the congress was also attended by external guests, such as George Habash, Khalid Fakhoum, Mahdi Shams al-Din, Walid Jumblatt, and Nabih Berri.

The congress began with a speech by Hafez al-Assad, mainly concerning foreign policy. After that, the delegates also gave speeches for some time, in which they praised the party and Assad for their successes. Any genuine and "unplanned" criticism of Hafez al-Assad was excluded from the discussion. But due to Assad's successes in foreign policy, the mood of the delegates at this congress was more positive than at the previous one. One of the points on the congress agenda was "the cessation of all forms of cooperation with Israel." Congress declared "our leader forever, the Faithful Hafez al-Assad." It was stated that loyalty to Assad was loyalty to the Ba'ath party and the people of Syria, and that a lack of such loyalty constituted a serious deviation. Assad's powers as general secretary of the party were extended.

== Aftermath ==
=== Election of a new Central Committee and the Regional Command ===
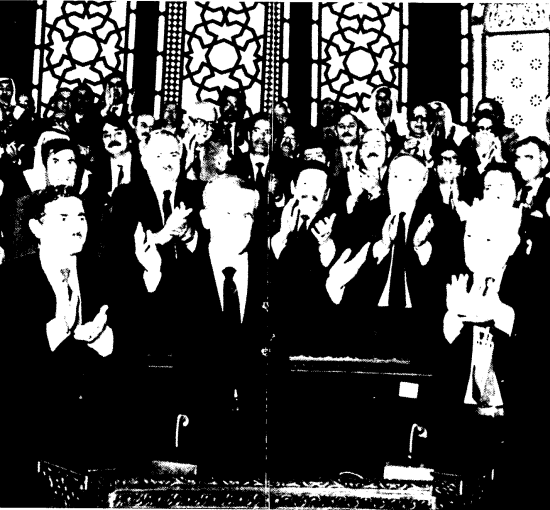
Eighth Regional Congress

Following the congress, a new Central Committee and a new Regional Command were elected (however, as a result, Regional Command's composition remained almost unchanged - essentially, the only officials who were not re-elected to the Regional Command were the allies of Rifaat al-Assad, who attempted a coup d'état in 1984). The Jama'a, that is, the politicians closest to Assad personally, controlled the nomination of candidates and their election to these bodies. The congress also expanded the Central Committee from 75 people to 90 and the president personally selected each member of the Central Committee. In the case of the Central Committee, half of its elected members had not previously been part of it. At least 17 military personnel were elected to the Central Committee.

=== Militarization plan ===
As part of strengthening their regional position, the delegates discussed the militarization of Syria. There was a general consensus that the pace of militarization was insufficient and needed to be accelerated, so the congress began developing a plan to reduce spending on all non-military aspects of citizens' lives in order to direct the "saved" funds towards increasing arms purchases. Interfering with military spending in order to reduce it was prohibited.

=== Economic reforms plan ===
Congress proposed introducing limited and controlled economic reforms to expand the private sector, which was intended to assist the often struggling state sector in providing for the population.

Nevertheless, the congress paid great attention to the balance between the private and public sectors of the economy (although before the congress there was strong support among some delegates for strengthening the public sector and increasing control over the private sector, after the congress the Infiraj policy was revived - in April 1985, Muhammad al-Imadi, the architect of the Infiraj policy, was reappointed Minister of Economy). State control over the economy and imports was reduced again. Soon, Syria received investments from West Germany, the European Investment Bank, and Arab Fund for Economic and Social Development.

=== Corruption and smuggling problems ===
The Congress also addressed the issue of combating corruption and smuggling – major problems in Syria. For example, approximately 70 percent of all Syrian imports were smuggled into the country by the Syrian army from Lebanon. Officials rarely intervened to prevent acts of embezzlement as long as the funds were being stolen by people loyal to them. The Committee for the Investigation of Illegal Profits, formally created in 1977 to combat corruption, proved ineffective. The president's brother, Rifaat al-Assad, was also involved in corruption and smuggling, which complicated the fight against these phenomena. At the congress, one of the delegates spoke about smuggling and proposed a complete ban on the black market originating from Lebanon. Another delegate also spoke and openly stated that this was impossible because all the delegates of the congress profited from it.

=== Purges ===
The Eighth Regional Congress, despite retaining almost all members of the Regional Command in their positions, also led to an immediate purge of Central Committee, as well as lower-ranking corrupt officials and those who assisted them. Massive personnel changes were made in the cabinet of ministers, with many ministers being replaced by new people (specifically, the ministers of industry, finance, economy and foreign trade, supply and domestic trade, agriculture and agrarian reform were replaced).

=== Final Congress' communiqué ===
The final communiqué of the congress was published on January 22, and it stated that Syria's two most important goals should be achieving strategic parity in all its dimensions and building a strong economy. The communiqué also strongly criticized the unsatisfactory performance of the state economic sector and promised a number of reforms as well as greater encouragement of foreign investment. The communiqué put forward a number of certain measures to achieve economic development: for example, it proposed measures to stimulate the export of Syrian goods abroad, encourage foreign investment, a program to reduce domestic oil consumption in order to boost exports, and a reorganization of the Syrian pound's exchange rate system.

=== Next Congress ===
From 1985 Congress until Hafez al-Assad's death and Bashar al-Assad's rise to power in 2000, regional congresses were never held in Syria. The 9th Regional Congress was held from June 17 to 20, 2000.

== See also ==
- Five-year plans of Ba'athist Syria
- Corrective Movement (Syria)
- Al-Ta`addudiyya Al-Iqtisadiyya
- Control and Inspection Committee
- 1979 Ba'ath Party Purge
