= Five-year plans of Ba'athist Syria =

Economic plans of Syria

The Five-year Plans for Economic Expansion and the Advancement of Society (Arabic: الخطة الخمسية للتوسع الاقتصادي وتقدم المجتمع, romanized: Al-Khutat Al-Khamsiat Liltawasue Alaiqtisadii Wataqadum Al-mujtamae) were economic development projects in Syria during the Ba'ath Party rule (1963–2024), inspired by the Soviet model. The goals set within the framework of Ba'athist five-year plans are known as National Development Goals. The first five-year plan was introduced before the Ba'ath Party came to power, but it ended under it. The main essence and direction of the five-year plans are mainly discussed at meetings of the Central Committee of the Ba'ath Party. The main role in the formulation and approval of Five-Year Plans is played by the so-called State Planning Commission.

Since 2011, the Five-Year Plans have ceased to be implemented, although they have not been officially cancelled. Starting in 2014, the Bashar al-Assad regime announced a transition to three-year plans. The failure of the first five-year plans could be explained by political instability, while the last one was marked by civil war. In total, ten five-year plans were implemented and eleven were announced.

== History ==
The five-year plan system first came to Syria in 1958, when the country united with Egypt to form the United Arab Republic, and fell victim to the implementation of extremely aggressive socialist and Nasserist policies. When Syria united with Egypt, the new government embarked on a large-scale nationalization of enterprises. The first Five-Year Plan was adopted two years later, in 1960. However, in 1961, a coup by disgruntled officers led to Syria's secession from Egypt and the virtual collapse of the UAR. Another coup occurred in 1963, bringing the Military Committee of the Ba'ath Party to power. Although there were initially some signs of renewed rapprochement with Egypt, relations deteriorated significantly after the failed coup attempt in July 1963, launched by Nasserist Jassem Alwan with support of Egyptian intelligence. However, the Ba'ath Party did not abandon the Five-Year Plan system - it continued the first and later launched subsequent ones. Each of the plans was considered an official document for the next five years: They outlined the desired goals for society and the state and outlined the necessary measures to achieve them. In most cases, the five-year plan was formulated by the government 2-3 years before its start.

The main essence and direction of the five-year plans are mainly discussed during a meetings of the Central Committee of the Ba'ath Party. In total, ten five-year plans were implemented and eleven were announced - although this system was not officially abolished, with the outbreak of the Syrian revolution in 2011, the Ba'athist government became much less concerned with implementing new plans and focused all its resources on suppressing the uprising, which later escalated into a civil war.

== Other names ==
The Five-Year Plan system, used in Ba'athist Syria, was also known as the Five-year Plans for Social and Economic Development (Arabic: الخمسية الخمسة للتنمية الإقتصادية والإجتمعية, romanized: al-Khamsiyyah al-Khāmisah Littanmiyyah al-Iqtiṣādiyyah wa-l-Ijtimaiyyah) or just the National Development Plans (Arabic: خطط التنمية الوطنية, romanized: Khatat Al-Tanmiat Al-Watania).

== Five-year plans ==
=== First plan (1960–1965) ===
In September 1958, the UAR government prepared a ten-year plan for Syria, but it was replaced by a more planned, so-called Five-Year Industrialization Plan.

As part of the plan, so-called Rural Development Centers (or RDC) were created. Their goal was to develop rural areas socially and economically. RDC's were created by the Egyptians based on their experience of interacting with similar organizations. However, Syria and Egypt had significant differences in such parameters as population density, standard of living, social structure, and so on - which meant that the approach had to be different.

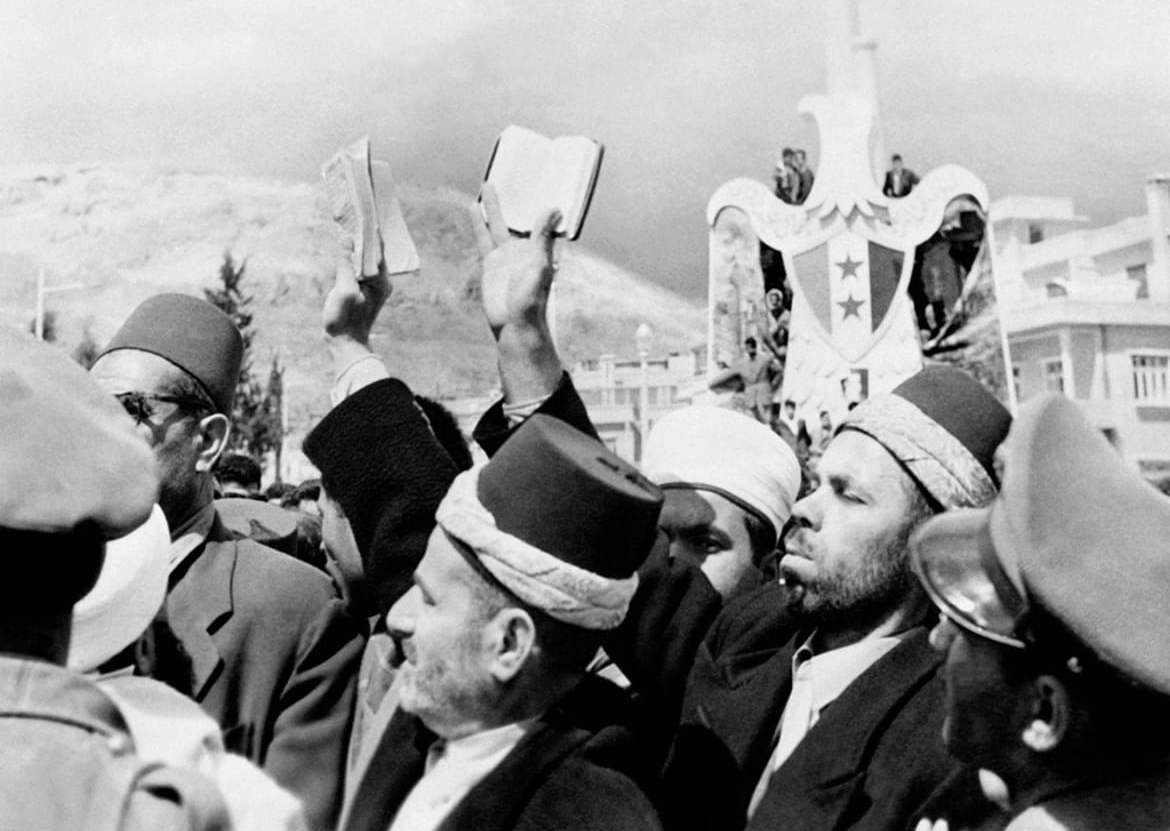
Celebrations of the UAR establishment anniversary, 1959

The first five-year plan, announced in July 1960, set a number of goals and investment amounts for different sectors of the economy - the budget for the development of irrigation was to be around 780 million Syrian pounds, agriculture - 95 million, industrial and energy sector - 186 million, transport and communications - 387 million, education and health - 153 million, housing - 101 million, and 18 million for other sectors. The plan envisaged doubling the gross output of goods and services, i.e., an annual growth rate of 7.2 percent, by 1970 within the framework of a ten-year program consisting of two five-year plans, as well as doubling the national income. The costs to achieve this result were as follows (in the same order of sectors): 367 million Syrian pounds, 111 million, 408 million, 420 million, 157 million, 311 million and 102 million. Such volumes of funds from the plan spent on the development of irrigation were explained by the fact that at that time the Syrian economy consisted almost entirely of the agricultural sector, which requires a good climate - and irrigation would allow for an expansion of the volume of irrigated and arable land. But the United Arab Republic collapsed in 1961, after a coup d'etat by the Syrian army officers under the leadership of SARCAF.

In addition to economic development, the plan called for the development of education and increased coverage of the population. The goal was to expand primary schools (mostly, but not entirely, public) to ensure there were enough to cover all young children: in 1965, £125 million was allocated to education, second only to the military. The educational system was highly centralized and completely controlled by the Ministry of Education, which contributed to its militarization. The Ba'athists also began a campaign to strengthen state control over private schools.

When the Ba'ath Party came to power in 1963, it continued the projects laid out in the First Five-Year Plan. However, under Ba'athism, military spending skyrocketed—it is estimated that it accounted for 50-60 percent of the budget—but this money was not recycled back into the economy, as weapons were imported from abroad. At that time, agriculture and industry in the country were almost entirely in the hands of private individuals or companies. These private enterprises were very reluctant to invest their money in government development projects as outlined in the plan, leading to an aggressive nationalization campaign in 1965, started with signing of Ramadan Socialist Decrees. However, the entire plan was essentially based on the assumption by the UAR's authorities in Cairo that the Syrian economy would remain in the hands of private companies that would invest in it - assumption, that was broken by the Ba'athists. Initially, about half of all funds for the first five-year plan were obtained from external sponsors. However, all Syrian banks and branches of other Arab banks were already nationalized less than two months after the Ba'athists came to power, on May 2, 1963.

For this reason, among other reasons, the plan was only partially implemented - most of the expenses were never met due to the aggressive nationalization of private companies by the Ba'athist National Council for the Revolutionary Command, which was the main focus during the planning process.

=== Second plan (1965–1970) ===
In 1964, the government announced that the plan had been completed 6 months ahead of schedule. By mid-1965, however, the draft of the second five-year plan was still not ready, although the budget for that year had already been drawn up. It was already clear from them that, in essence, this was simply a continuation of the first five-year plan: the distribution of government expenditure was similar: as before, approximately 70 percent of the budget was planned to be allocated to the development of production projects, and the remaining 30 to social services. The second plan confirmed the continuation of the goal of doubling the national income, begun in 1960. The plan, however, significantly increased investment in the public sector - at the same time, the plan's dependence on external sponsorship increased (56 percent of investment in the public sector came from abroad). Also, within these divisions, changes in funding did occur - for example, if in the first five-year plan only 6 percent was allocated to utilities and housing, then in the second this number increased to 15 percent of the total plan budget. The amount of second-plan expenditure exceeded the first-plan expenditure by 10 percent. The Second Five-Year Plan also set the goal of creating a stable and continuous economic development program that would increase the country's national income by 42 percent. This Five-Year Plan also planned to allocate 21 percent of the total budget to transport, which amounted to £790 million, but by the midpoint of the plan, only £290 million had been spent. The plan also aimed at developing the petroleum industry.

The Second Five-Year Plan also placed a strong emphasis on irrigation: for example, it set the ambitious goal of land reclamation and irrigation of the Ghab Marsh and surrounding areas by the end of 1965, as well as the construction of a massive dam on the Euphrates River (which was completed only in third five-year plan and became known as the Tabqa Dam). During the second plan, the government invested about 136 million Syrian pounds in the agricultural sector, which was not enough. The Second Five-Year Plan also focused on expanding universities in Aleppo and Damascus.

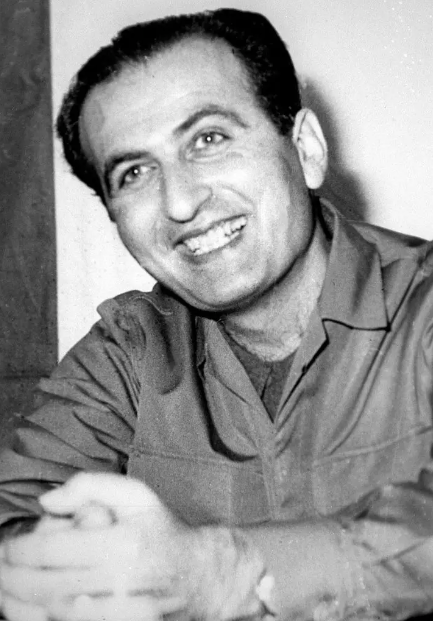
Pro-Marxist general Salah Jadid, de facto leader of Syria (1966–1970)

In 1966, another military coup took place in Syria and the radical neo-Ba'athist general Salah Jadid came to power. Jadid's extreme pro-Marxist views radically changed the Ba'ath Party's approach, including to economic policy. Jadid became close to communist groups and adopted a Marxist program of economic development and political direction, as well as Marxist atheism - his regime carried out active propaganda attacks against religion. His aggressive policies alienated all sections of the country's population: it did not contribute to development, but only led to decline. Due to such a sharp change in policy towards a more radical direction, some documents indicate 1966 as the beginning of the second five-year plan.

Almost immediately after coming to power, the Jadid regime faced intense trade union pressure over low wages and poor working conditions, demanding improvements to both. In response, the profit-sharing scheme was changed to a more favorable one, and a program was implemented to establish a network of kindergartens for the children of working mothers.

In March 1966, the completion of the first stage of the land reform program, after which all large landowners had their surplus land confiscated, was announced, and the beginning of the second stage was announced: the redistribution of the confiscated land. By the end of 1966, local committees consisting of party representatives and the Farm Laborers' Union had united to oversee the redistribution of land: at the same time, government officials strengthened centralized control over Syria's agricultural cooperatives. With Jadid's rise to power, the amount of land redistribution by the state increased significantly, from 20,500 hectares in 1965 to 70,400 in 1966.

The policy of the new government was particularly focused on the development of industry and the creation of large industrial enterprises in the state sector with the support of a number of other socialist states, such as the East Germany, Polish People's Republic, Czechoslovakia, the People's Republic of China and Soviet Union. In this regard, planned investments in the development of heavy industry increased significantly: if in the period 1961-1965 they amounted to an average of 113 million Syrian pounds, then in 1966-1967 they rose to 181 million, and in 1968-1969 to 252 million. To protect underdeveloped state-owned enterprises, officials during the Second Five-Year Plan period introduced strict restrictions and increased duties on imported goods; for example, in January 1967, a ban was imposed on the import of almost all foreign luxury goods into Syria. At that time, permitted imports had to be channeled exclusively through state-owned enterprises. However, by early 1967, this policy of developing state-owned enterprises had already encountered serious difficulties, primarily related to a severe capital shortage. In an attempt to solve these problems, the government only expanded state control over industry and trade. The Council of Ministers issued a wide range of decrees that transferred all wholesale trade under state control: private wholesalers were arrested. The government-controlled "Supply Board" was responsible for distributing basic consumer goods such as vegetable oil to the domestic market - already in early May 1966, security forces arrested 45 of Damascus's largest merchants, and the party newspaper al-Ba'ath dubbed them "Syria's Biggest Capitalists" and accusing them of undermining economic well-being of Syria. Around the same time, the government confiscated all real estate and froze the assets of other members of the trading elite. Basic consumer goods were rationed by the government in accordance with decrees signed at the end of May 1967. Sometimes this reached the point of absurdity: for example, it was forbidden to transport flour from one governorate of the country to another without obtaining a special permit. Already in May 1966, the government adopted the so-called "Economic Sanctions Law", also known as Decree No. 37, which imposed a 15-year prison sentence for what it called "economic sabotage" - such as transferring foreign currency or other assets from within the Syria outside the country. Like the first plan, the second plan is mostly failed to achieve its goals for a number of reasons, such as political upheaval and Syria's catastrophic defeat in the Six-Day War of 1967.

=== Third plan (1971–1975) ===
In the autumn of 1970, the Minister of Municipal and Rural Affairs announced that the future Third Five-Year Plan aimed to build 119,000 housing units, capable of providing housing for more than half a million people.

In 1970, the so-called Corrective Revolution took place in Syria: Salah Jadid was overthrown by his former comrade, army general Hafez al-Assad. Assad announced Syria's departure from Jadid's policies, toward relative liberalization, and launched a large-scale campaign of comprehensive reforms known as the Corrective Movement. In 1971, Assad was officially elected president and launched the Third Five-Year Plan. Some of the main goals set by the plan were: completion of the Euphrates Dam by 1975; improvement of irrigation methods; increase in labor productivity through better training and the introduction of more modern technology; increase in land productivity; increase the number of agricultural and service cooperatives from 1,600 to 4,500; develop scientific research in the field of agriculture.

Immediately after the Corrective Revolution (according to other sources, after the Yom Kippur War), the government officially announced the start of infiraj - a policy aimed at liberalizing the economy to attract foreign capital. Between 1971 and 1972, the Ministry of Industry issued more than 100 licenses to private individuals to build their own plants. In 1972, the private sector accounted for 29 percent of foreign trade and employed 62 percent of all workers in the country. In March 1974, a series of government decrees were signed to facilitate the work of the private sector, for example, in signing loan agreements.

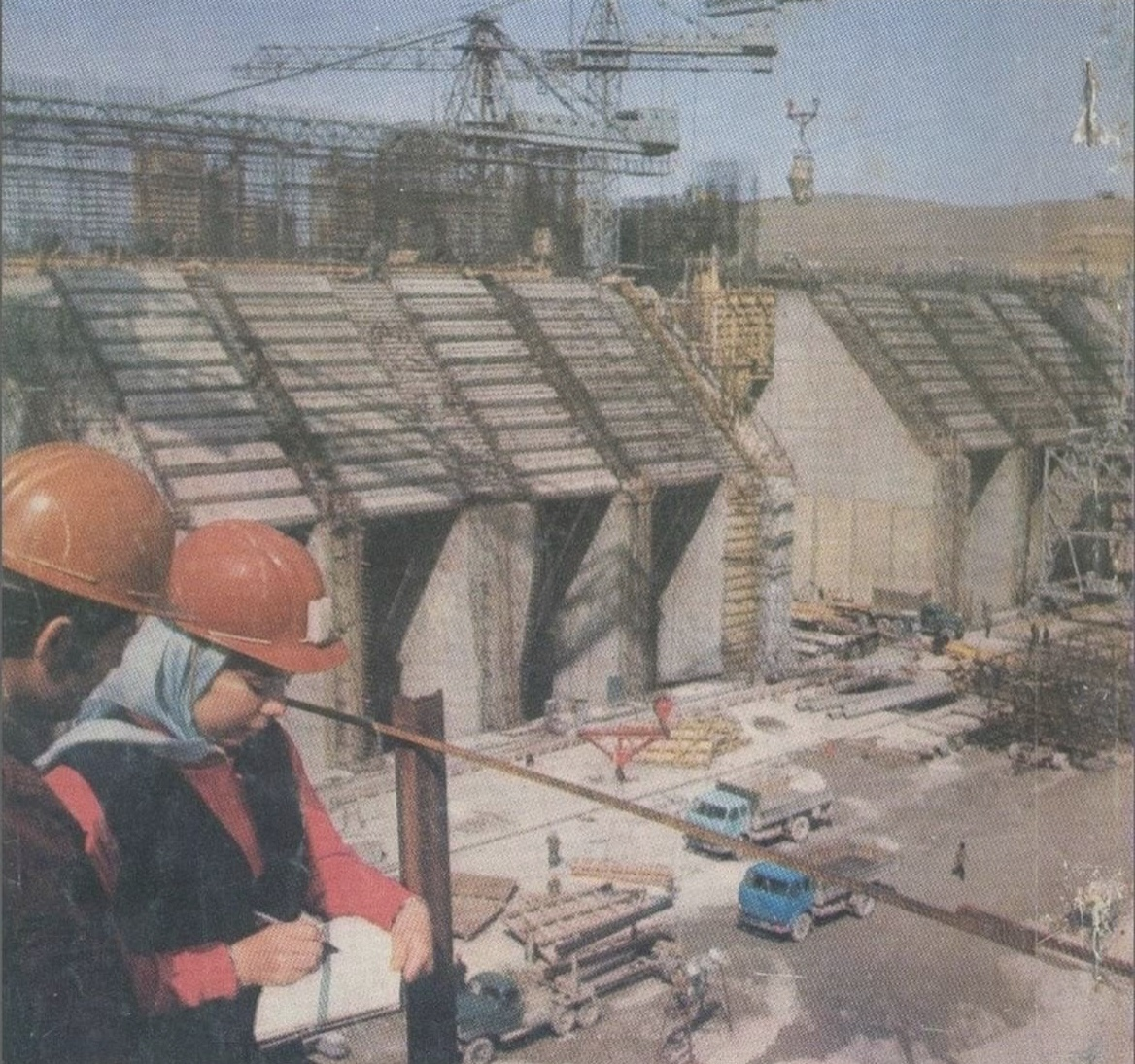
Construction of the Euphrates Dam, 1972. It was done one year later.

However, relative liberalization did not reduce the level of government intervention in economic planning, but only made it easier to obtain and work with investments. Moreover, the overwhelming majority of third plan investments went to the public sector rather than the private sector: 79.2 percent and 20.8 percent respectively. Government officials continued to play a role in distributing income and concentrating it in economic sectors of particular interest to them.

The Third Five-Year Plan marked a leap forward for Syria in developing its economy, social sector, and political institutions. The New York Times newspaper called these years "Five Years of Progress." The new government encouraged the private sector and gave it a new lease of life, which facilitated foreign investment: the plan was characterized by comparative deregulation of the economy by the state. Compared to the second five-year plan, investments in the third have increased significantly, and the results have become more favorable. For example, state funding for the then very important agricultural sector increased from 136 million Syrian pounds in the second plan to 890 million (654 percent grow). Syria's imports increased by 332 percent and exports by 376 percent from 1970 to 1974. In the textile industry, public investment rose from 12 million Syrian pounds in 1971 to as much as 311 million in 1975, and in the chemical industry, investments grew from 28 million in 1971 to 883 million in 1975. State investments of the third plan were concentrated on more strategically important sectors of the economy and parts of the income - for example, the construction of a dam on the Euphrates (the Tabqa Dam) or oil fields and stations: 80 percent of all investments in the plan were directed towards the development of industry and transport. For example, about 1.5 billion Syrian pounds were invested in the construction of the Euphrates dam, and 1 billion each in the industrial and energy sectors, out of a total public investment of 6.5 billion SPs (not including 1.5 billion SPs from private investors).

The amount of precipitation turned out to be higher than expected, which resulted in the fulfillment of the requirements set by the plan regarding the production of wheat, vegetables and fruits. But the economic program mainly focused on projects in textile, hydrocarbon, and iron production. Fertilizer, cement, aluminum, and phosphate plants also received a major boost. During the plan period (1970–1975), GNP grew by 8.2-10.7 percent annually, exceeding the projected figure: however, over the entire plan, investments only reached 70 percent of the planned amount. Agriculture grew by an average of 7 percent annually. Manufacturing output increased by 34 percent. Along with the introduction of large-scale investment and the opening of foreign companies, the third and subsequent five-year plans also included the goal of import substitution and greater self-sufficiency in consumer goods production. For example, cotton buckle production increased from 20,000 tons in 1970 to 32,000 tons in 1975 (though this was lower than the planned 48,000 tons).

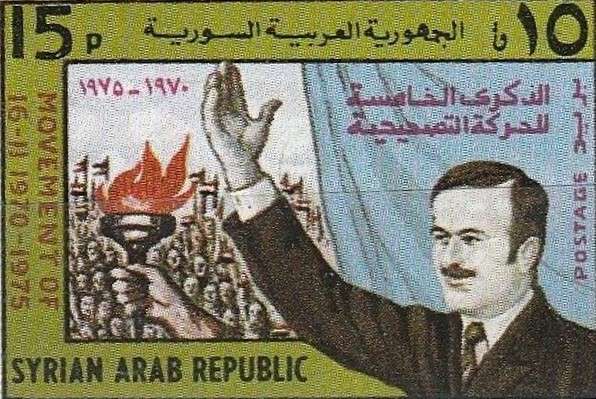
Syrian postage stamp commemorating the fifth anniversary of Corrective Movement as well as the last year of Third Five-Year Plan, 1975

Due to the obsolescence of most of the railway stock, a large number of new ones were ordered in 1971. A very important achievement of the plan was the completion of the project to build a railway line between the cities of Damascus and Homs (until this point, the cities were connected to each other by a railway line passing only through neighboring Lebanon). The effects of this plan became particularly noticeable after the Yom Kippur War of 1973, which led to a huge oil embargo and a sharp rise in oil prices, and with it an increase in cash injections into Syria from the rich oil-producing states of the Persian Gulf. Despite the war, Syria has gained more than lost economically. However, due to the damage caused by the war, the plan was adjusted to take into account the need to restore the destruction, so that half of the plan's total investments were made in its last two years. The exchange rate was relatively favorable, at 4.3 Syrian pounds per US dollar in 1975. Throughout most of the plan, Syria's balance of payments was in surplus. However, periodic inefficiencies in economic management led to underutilization of capacity, and the deficiencies in coordination and planning persisted. The government had to launch a major anti-corruption crackdown to reduce losses caused by ineffective management.

The plan included the goal of increasing the number of students and increasing the number of educated citizens. During the plan, demand for education increased sharply: new enrollment growth at all school levels ranged from a 43 percent increase to a 65 percent increase—tertiary enrollment increased by 66 percent, in period between 1970 and 1976. The plan also led to the gradual revival of the bourgeoisie, crushed under Salah Jadid, which finally emerged in the 1990s and became known as the "New Class" (al-tabaqa al-jadida).

=== Fourth plan (1976–1980) ===
Despite the payment surplus during the Third Plan, by the beginning of the Fourth Five-Year Plan the deficit was becoming noticeable: the trade balance continued to deteriorate, and imports began to grow faster than exports. The annual deficit of economic resources during the Fourth Five-Year Plan period increased to 13-18 percent, although in the previous one it was only 8 percent. Near the end of the Third Five-Year Plan, the government formulated an ambitious program to dramatically accelerate Syria's industrial development, or industrialization. Its goals were largely formulated only in the final two years of the Third Plan and were therefore carried over into the Fourth Five-Year Plan. The plan aimed to significantly reduce the growth rate of imports of goods from abroad. The plan's final planned investment was 54 billion Syrian pounds, more than double the previous plan's investment of 20 billion.

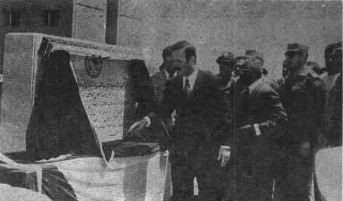
President Assad at the opening ceremony of the Euphrates Dam power plant, 1978

The fourth five-year plan was ready for implementation only in 1976 and was in effect until 1980. One of the main goals of the plan was to fully enroll boys in primary schools by its end in 1980 and to increase efforts to enroll all girls in primary schools by 1990. The desired targets were achieved: by the early 1980s, all boys and 85 percent of girls were enrolled in primary school. However, later secondary school enrolment dropped sharply, demonstrating high dropout rates.

In response to the Islamist uprising in Syria and the government's increased need for broader popular support, the Ba'ath Party's seventh regional congress was held in January 1980, at which the investments of the Fourth Five-Year Plan for the remaining year were adjusted - some of the previously unallocated expenditure was redirected to improving the lives of the peasants in order to secure their full support. Law No. 3 of April 1, 1980, on the determination of budgetary appropriations for the relevant year, noted that all state appropriations for the year not included in the fourth five-year plan are added there, adjusted to take into account the investments provided for by the same plan (Article 3 of the law).

=== Fifth plan (1981–1985) ===
Building on the failures and setbacks of the Fourth Five-Year Plan, the Fifth set less ambitious development goals. As a result of the Fifth Five-Year Plan policy, government agencies received significantly broader powers in the area of marketing agricultural products, setting priorities, and introducing more sophisticated methods of agricultural production. In 1984, further attempts were made to revive the agricultural sector of the economy - investments in it increased by 30 percent (for comparison, investments in industry increased by only 2.2 percent, and in the mining industry they fell sharply, by 33 percent). Government subsidies on diesel fuel, gasoline, and gas were drastically cut, and prices on a number of products were raised to stimulate agricultural production and sales, as well as imposed severe restrictions on the import of industrial and technological goods.

By the end of the plan, only 70 percent of the total planned investment had actually been realized. Instead of the planned growth of 44.7 percent, real GDP only fell during this period. Instead of the planned 8.9 percent annual investment growth, they grew by an average of only 2.9 percent, and government spending grew annually by 9 percent (instead of the planned 6.4). A number of economic sectors have failed to reach even close to the level of development originally planned, although electricity production and manufacturing still increased.

=== Sixth plan (1986–1990) ===
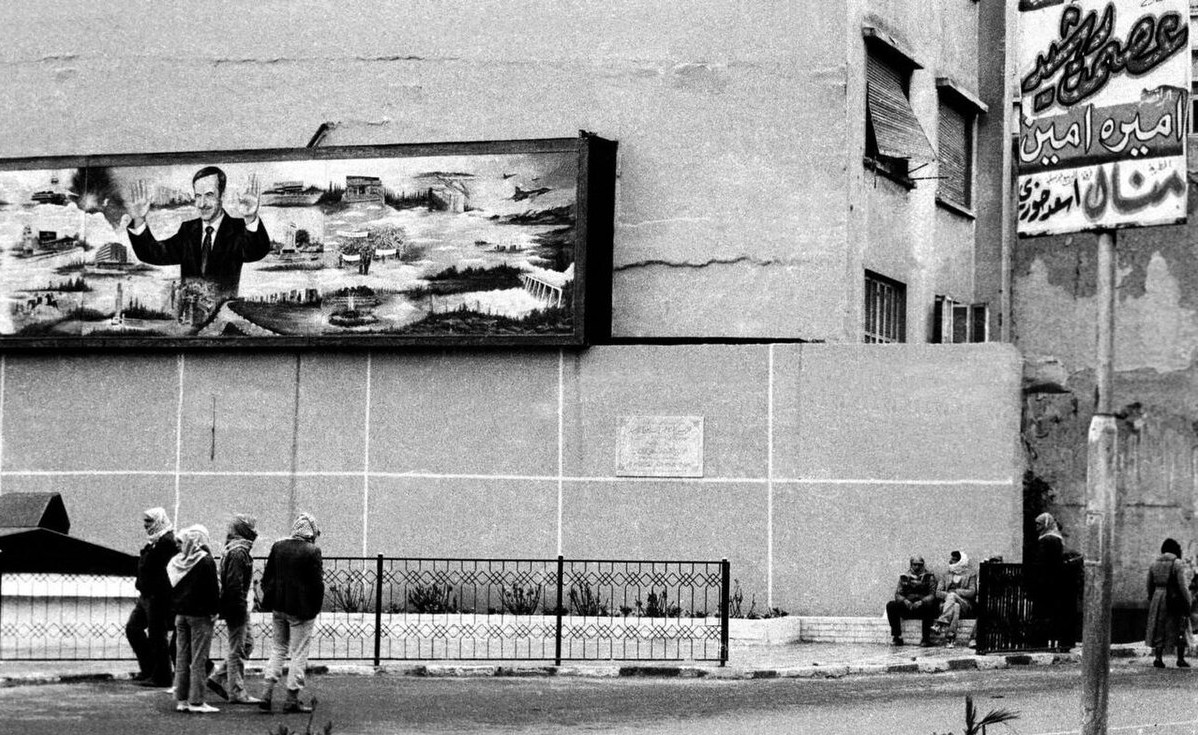
Damascus in 1986

At the Eighth Regional Congress in January 6, 1985, the party voiced its goal of increasing the pace of militarization, discussing a revision of the Five-Year Plan to accommodate the demand for increased spending on the armed forces: the main proposals were to cut spending in other areas and postpone a number of projects. In this regard, the sixth plan was accompanied by a policy of austerity, also introduced in 1986 - the government cut spending on everything except the army.

The investment scheme and its sectoral distribution were almost no different from the fifth five-year plan. In order to stop inflation, in September 1986 the government passed Law No. 24, which, in addition to the long-standing Economic Sanctions Law, introduced strict penalties for smuggling national currency and prohibited transactions with foreign currency. The plan produced even worse economic results than the previous one, and achieved almost none of his goals.

=== Seventh plan (1991–1995) ===
The Seventh Plan finally gave the highest priority to the development of the agricultural sector of the economy, declaring the achievement of self-sufficiency in most agricultural products as the most important goal, therefore, during this period there was an increase in prices for the corresponding products. The plan was never completed and did not achieve most of its goals, but it marked the end of centralized economic control in Syria. However, despite the overall failure, agriculture was able to achieve good growth during the Seventh Plan.

=== Eighth plan (1996–2000) ===
In the eighth plan, the goal of self-sufficiency was replaced by "food security" - the essence was to produce slightly in excess of the required quantity of goods, sell the surplus abroad, and use this money to cover the cost of importing goods not produced in Syria itself, instead of trying to import-substitute all foreign goods. This plan also set a new goal (which was adopted by the subsequent one) - the conservation of biodiversity (including the protection of forests).

=== Ninth plan (2001–2005) ===
In 2000, Hafez al-Assad died of health complications, and his son, Bashar al-Assad, became president in his stead after symbolic elections. He continued his father's reform agenda of the 1990s and was particularly determined to implement it. Young Assad sought to frame his leadership around modernizing and opening the economy. He emphasized, in particular, "the need to modernize the regulatory environment and the industrial base, activate and encourage the private sector, remove bureaucratic obstacles to investment, increase job opportunities, qualify cadres, improve education and expand information technology."

The Ninth Five-Year Plan was adopted a year later, in 2001. Annual GDP growth was planned at 3 percent, and the share of investment was to increase from 18.2 percent in 2000 to 27 percent in 2005. The public administration system and state-owned enterprises were to be reformed, but the government was still opposed privatization. Despite the push for liberal and pro-capitalist reforms, the state was still the dominant sector in the country's economy - only 30 percent of the economy was private. The investment was to amount to 184 billion Syrian pounds (14 percent higher than the previous plan) or 3.5 billion US dollars. Investments were primarily planned to be directed towards the development of transport, communications, water supply and energy. Almost all of these investments were planned to be directed to the public sector. Compared with the previous plan, investment in public transport and related infrastructure has increased by 400 percent. In addition to economic goals, the plan hoped to expand opportunities and further improve the social status of women. The plan continued to focus part of its attention on the country's ecology. Between 2000 and 2007, GDP and GDP per capita grew by 5 and 2 percent, respectively.

=== Tenth plan (2006–2010) ===
The Tenth Five-Year Plan, officially known as the Five-Year Plan for Deregulation, set goals of decentralization, finishing the final stage of transition to the social market economy system, more establishment/reform of economic planning institutions for greater efficiency, and integration of Syria into the global economy by 2020. The plan was only partially successful, partly due to severe drought and insufficient private investment.

=== Eleventh plan (2011–2015) ===
The Eleventh Five-Year Plan was planned to be implemented between 2011 and 2015. The plan was expected to create a more efficient model of a social market economy. The plan's main investments were to be directed towards the re-development of the public sector, primarily industry and infrastructure: the main target for investment was inefficient state-owned companies, which were supposed to be radically reformed. The planned investment was 4.3 trillion Syrian pounds.

However, that same year, the Syrian Revolution broke out, followed by a full-scale civil war, and therefore the Bashar al-Assad regime no longer attempted to implement this and the new five-year plans, concentrating all its resources on winning the war.

== Transition to three-year plans ==
Against the backdrop of civil war and a series of grave military defeats in 2014, the Bashar al-Assad regime embarked on a largely futile attempt at economic reform in an attempt to convince at least some people of its commitment to reform. This year, the government unveiled a completely new, three-year development plan (officially called the "Interventionist Approach to Development"), under the slogan of a "new approach to economic development."

The development plan was summarized in three points: first, the development of industry and agriculture. Second, expanding the state's ability to control the market. And third, "strengthening the concept of partnership and economic and social reintegration into the development and production process," which is a very vague formulation. Whatever the three-year plan envisioned, the civil war can't and did not contribute to development and led only to a humanitarian catastrophe and economic collapse.

== See also ==
- Five-Year plans of Romania
- Five-year plans of China
- Five-Year Plans of South Korea
