= Law No. 49 =

Law against Syrian Muslim Brotherhood movement

- Territorial extent: Ba'athist Syria
- Effective: 7 July 1980
- Repealed: 8 December 2024 (de facto)
- Status: Repealed

Law No. 49 was a political law in Ba'athist Syria, aimed against the activities of the regional Muslim Brotherhood organization in the country. The law was introduced on July 7, 1980, by the president Hafez al-Assad, and banned any activity by the Muslim Brotherhood in Syria, punishing those associated with it by the death penalty. The law has repeatedly been condemned by international human rights organizations and was hailed as establishing one of the harshest legal positions against the Muslim Brotherhood in the world.

== Background ==
From 1976 to 1982, the Islamist uprising, led by the Muslim Brotherhood, took place in Syria. Over time, the uprising became increasingly intense and bloody. On June 26, 1980, militants even staged a nearly successful assassination attempt on President Hafez al-Assad: in retaliation, the very next day, soldiers from the Defense Companies flew into Tadmor prison and killed hundreds of prisoners suspected of having ties to the Muslim Brotherhood.

== Implementation ==
On June 30, the President presented the law to the People's Assembly: On the same day, at 18.00, the first meeting of the People's Assembly took place, at which the adoption of the law was discussed. The second meeting took place on July 6 at 18.20. The third meeting took place on July 7 at 18.15. All three times, the majority of those who participated in the vote unanimously supported the law: so, on July 7, the Constituent Assembly approved the law by a majority vote, and on July 8, the President personally ratified it. Law was ratificated ten days after massacre in Tadmor prison.

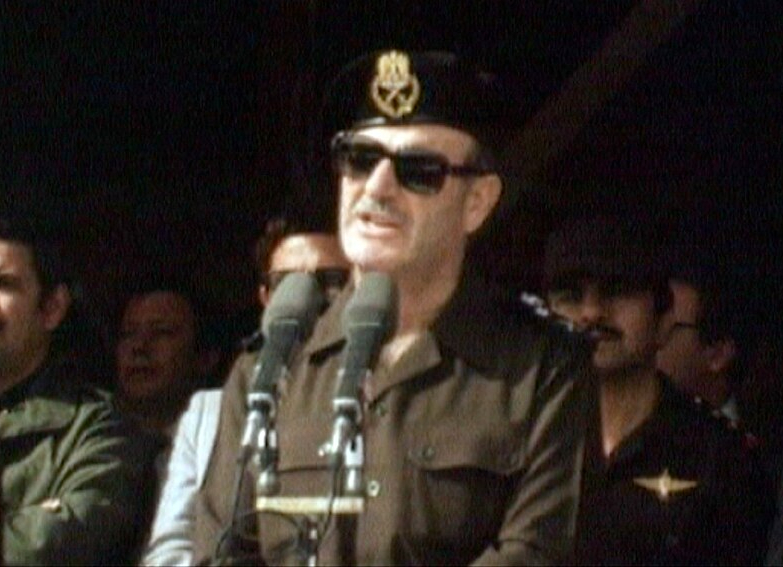
Hafez al-Assad speech in 1980

Law No.49 banned any activity by the Muslim Brotherhood in Syria, punishing those associated with it with the death penalty. The law also applied not only to members of the Muslim Brotherhood itself, but also to their spouses, children and parents. Thus, even close relatives were sentenced to death, and all executions carried out under Law No. 49 were carried out in secret. Law also gave people some time (one month) to voluntarily surrender to the authorities and avoid punishment: however, after its ratification, despite that, all leaders and members of the organization were put on the wanted list. The introduction of the law was a major step towards the complete dissolution of the Muslim Brotherhood's activities in Syria. Eventually tens of thousands of Syrians have been sentenced to death, prison or hard labor under Law No. 49.

Since its adoption by the regime of Hafez al-Assad, the law has never been repealed, even after his death. Even when some government officials claimed the law had been frozen, while others said it had been completely repealed, both claims turned out to be false. But the severity of the punishment has been reduced over time - to just 12 years' imprisonment with hard labor, deprivation of civil rights, a ban on entry and fines. Meanwhile, prison terms were also reduced over time, from 12 years to 8 and later 6. During the Syrian civil war, the opposition did not support the law in the controlled territories, so it essentially did not apply there.

The law was welcomed by the Republican Party of the United States decades later, which wanted to similarly ban the Muslim Brotherhood's activities in its own country.

== Articles of the law ==
Law No.49 consists of 6 articles.

First article of the law says:

Each and everyone belonging to the Muslim Brotherhood Movement is considered a criminal who will be sentenced to death.

Second article of the law says:

(a) - Any person associated with this group shall be exempt from the penalty provided by this law or any other law if he declares his withdrawal within one month from the date of the coming into force of this law. (b) - The revocation must be declared by written declaration, delivered personally to the governor or ambassador for those outside the country, on the date of the issuance of this law.

Third article of the law says:

The punishment for criminal offenses committed by a member of the Muslim Brotherhood before the entry into force of this law shall be reduced for those inside the country and within two months for those outside it, in accordance with the following:

(a) - If the act carries the death penalty, life imprisonment with hard labor, or life imprisonment, the punishment shall be hard labor for up to five years.

(b) - If the act constitutes one of the other serious crimes, the punishment shall be imprisonment for a term of one to three years.

Fourth article of the law says:

Any person associated with the Muslim Brotherhood who surrenders within one month from the date of entry into force of this law, for those inside the country, and within two months for those outside the country, shall be exempted from punishment for offenses committed before the entry into force of this law, in order to achieve the goals of the Muslim Brotherhood.

Fifth article of the law says:

Persons under arrest or trial cannot benefit from the mitigation of punishment and pardon provided for by this law.

Sixth article of the law says:

This law shall be published in the Official Gazette and shall enter into force on the date of its publication.

== Criticism ==
Even if people tried to clear themselves of the charge of violating Law No. 49, upon arrival in Syria they were seized by the security services, to be later tried and shot (or imprisoned). The law was also condemned for being contrary to the principles and rules of the Syrian constitution.

When Bashar al-Assad came to power, many expressed hope that he would officially repeal Law No. 49. On April 21, Assad verbally ordered the law to be repealed, but in reality he merely softened the punishment for violating it - instead of execution, now 12 years in prison (however, this softening was cancelled with the beginning of the civil war). On May 31, 2011, against the backdrop of the escalating revolution, the Bashar government announced a pardon for all political prisoners who had been imprisoned before that date, including those imprisoned under Law No. 49.

== Muslim Brotherhood reaction ==
Many leaders and important people in the Muslim Brotherhood organization demanded that the law be repealed and said that rapprochement with the Assad government was only possible in this case. For example, the organization's deputy leader, Muhammed al-Sayyed, stated that they are ready to get closer to Assad if he completely repeals Law No. 49 and grants general amnesty to people convicted under it.

Even decades after its ratification and entry into force, the Muslim Brotherhood still expresses strong dissatisfaction with the existence of a law that was enacted against their activities in principle.

== De facto repeal of the law ==
The law was never repealed during the Ba'ath Party's rule. Even after its collapse in December 2024, the law did not cease to exist on paper, although it was no longer operational de facto.

== Other names ==
Law No. 49 is also known as Shame Law, Law 49/1980 or the Emergency Law #49.

== See also ==
- Human rights in Ba'athist Syria
- Terrorism in Ba'athist Syria
- Economic Sanctions Law
- Revolution Protection Law
