= Ta'addudiyya =

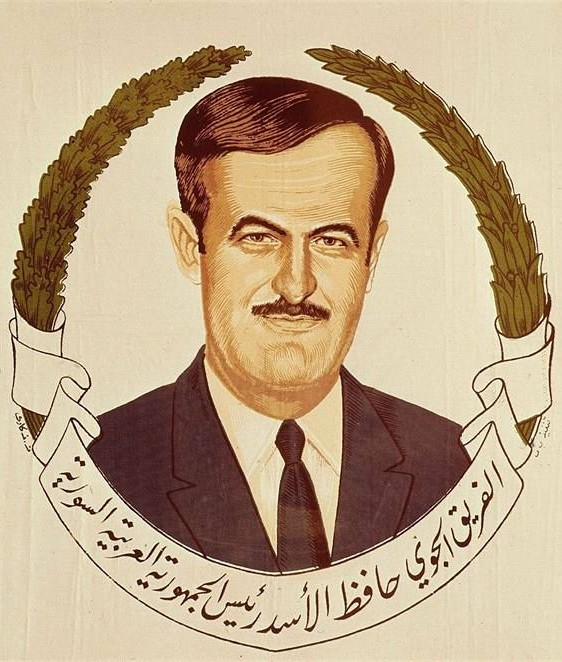
A propaganda brochure featuring Hafez al-Assad

Al-Ta'addudiyya (also known as Ta'adudia) was a concept of Assadism and policy of limited political and economic pluralism in Ba'athist Syria adopted by President Hafez al-Assad during his rule. It was part of so-called Corrective Movement program and one of many policies introduced by Hafez al-Assad after coming to power with the aim of economic, political and social reconstruction of Syria. The policy of ta'addudiyya should not be confused with the policy of purely economic pluralism, known as al-ta`addudiyya al-iqtisadiyya, which was introduced in 1991. However, the term "Ta'addudiyya" was also applied to this policy. While the two policies have similarities, they are also different: Ta'addudiyya was launched earlier and focused more on political pluralism than on economic pluralism (the policy that liberalized the economy in the 1970s was known as infiraj). The term was also frequently used by government officials and in Syrian state propaganda.

== Background ==
The Ba'ath Party had ruled Syria since 1963. In 1966, radical neo-Ba'athists came to power under the leadership of Salah Jadid, an atheist with clear pro-Marxist leanings. Jadid's seizure of power led to the introduction of radical policies within Syria and changes in its relations with other states - it was the 1966 coup that led to the split of the Ba'athist movement into pro-Iraqi and pro-Syrian sides, and also isolated Syria from most other countries in the region due to its confrontational slogans.

Jadid wanted to create a centralized one-party state, similar to those created in the Eastern Bloc in Europe. Jadid's avowedly radical Marxist regime was hated by about half a dozen other leftist factions in Syria. Throughout his reign, Jadid continued to refuse to approve the formation of a proposed "Progressive Front" with various Nasserist, Houranist and other leftist elements. His regime rejected any political pluralism, striving for total centralization around the only legal party in the country.

== Coup d'etat and policy changing ==
In 1970, a military coup in Syria ousted Jadid, and general Hafez al-Assad came to power. Although he had previously been an ally of Jadid and supported his policies, he was more pragmatic and opposed such an aggressive implementation of his ideas.

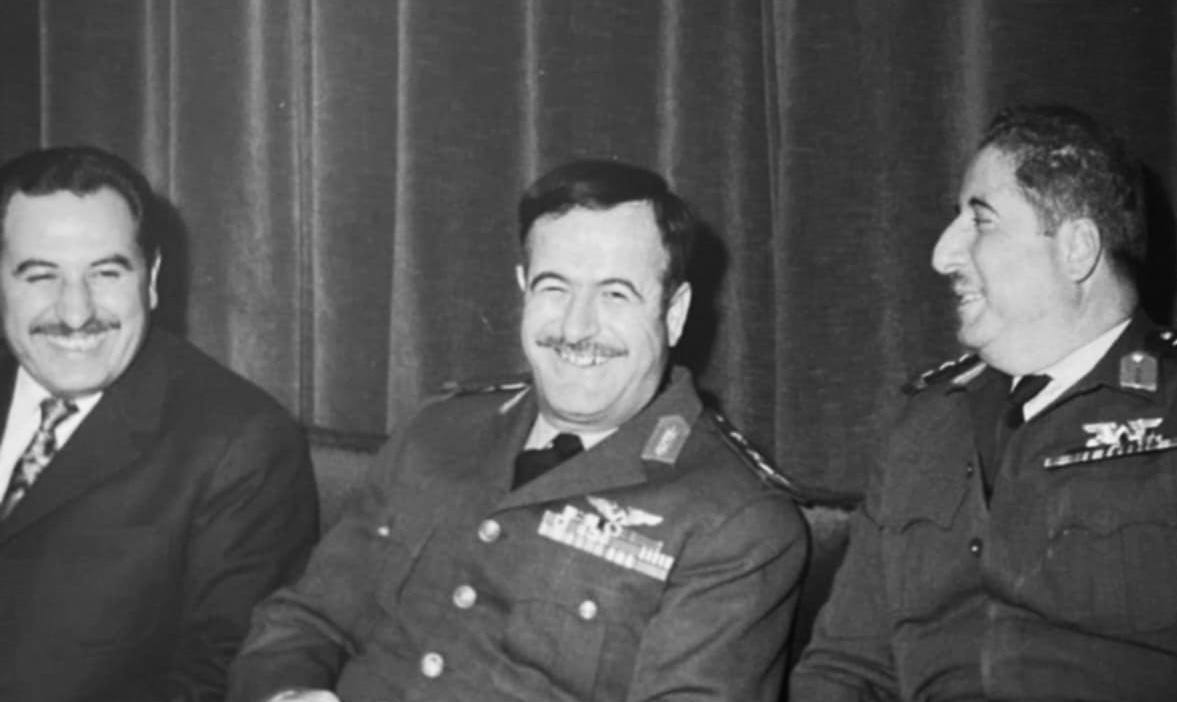
Assad with his comrades short after the 1970 coup

The communiqué of November 16, 1970, criticized Assad's Ba'athist predecessors, and especially the Jadid regime, for their authoritarian and anti-popular rule, oppression of the masses, and widening gaps between the people and the party. The communiqué declared Syria's need to change its economic, political, and social course. Regarding foreign policy, the communiqué stated that the government would strengthen relations with Arab progressive and reformist governments, while developing relations with socialist and Third World countries. Assad stated that he intended to move away from the authoritarian approach by reorganizing the ruling party, popular organizations, and introducing pluralism in accordance with democratic principles, "correcting" the state's course.

Almost the entire 5th Regional Congress, held from 8 to 13 May 1971, was devoted to discussing the difficult legacy of Jadid's far-left regime and how to address it. Most of those attending the congress believed that Jadid and his associates had deviated from the true ideas of Ba'athism. Issues of centralization of power, popular democracy, and relations between the party and the people were also addressed. At the 11th National Congress, held from August 23 to 29, 1971, Assad assured party members that his leadership was a radical change from that of Jadid, and he would implement a "corrective movement" to return Syria to the true "nationalist socialist line". One of the significant policies introduced by Assad after coming to power was the infiraj policy, which was aimed at developing the economy.

== Ta'addudiyya policy ==
=== Politics ===
Assad stated that the situation and political situation in Syria did not allow for competitive elections, so he never sought them. However, he willingly introduced a policy of political pluralism, i.e., Ta'addudiyya, which succeeded in ensuring greater popular participation and non-Ba'athist political groups in Syria's governance. But, despite the policy of limited pluralism, democratization of Syria was never Assad's ultimate goal.

Although Hafez al-Assad's regime remained rigidly centralized around the president himself and his al-Jama'a (the inner circle of supporters who have the greatest influence on Assad's ultimate decisions), it nevertheless became more responsive to the wishes and opinions of the people than his predecessor. This word means "pluralism" in Arabic, and in the 1990s, Syrian officials increasingly used this term.

Ta'addudiyya brought an end to the one-party system. Although the Ba'ath Party remained the most powerful and influential of all parties operating in Syria, it was no longer the only legal party and no longer governed alone: political pluralism culminated in the formation of a coalition of socialist parties known as the National Progressive Front in 1972.

=== Economy ===
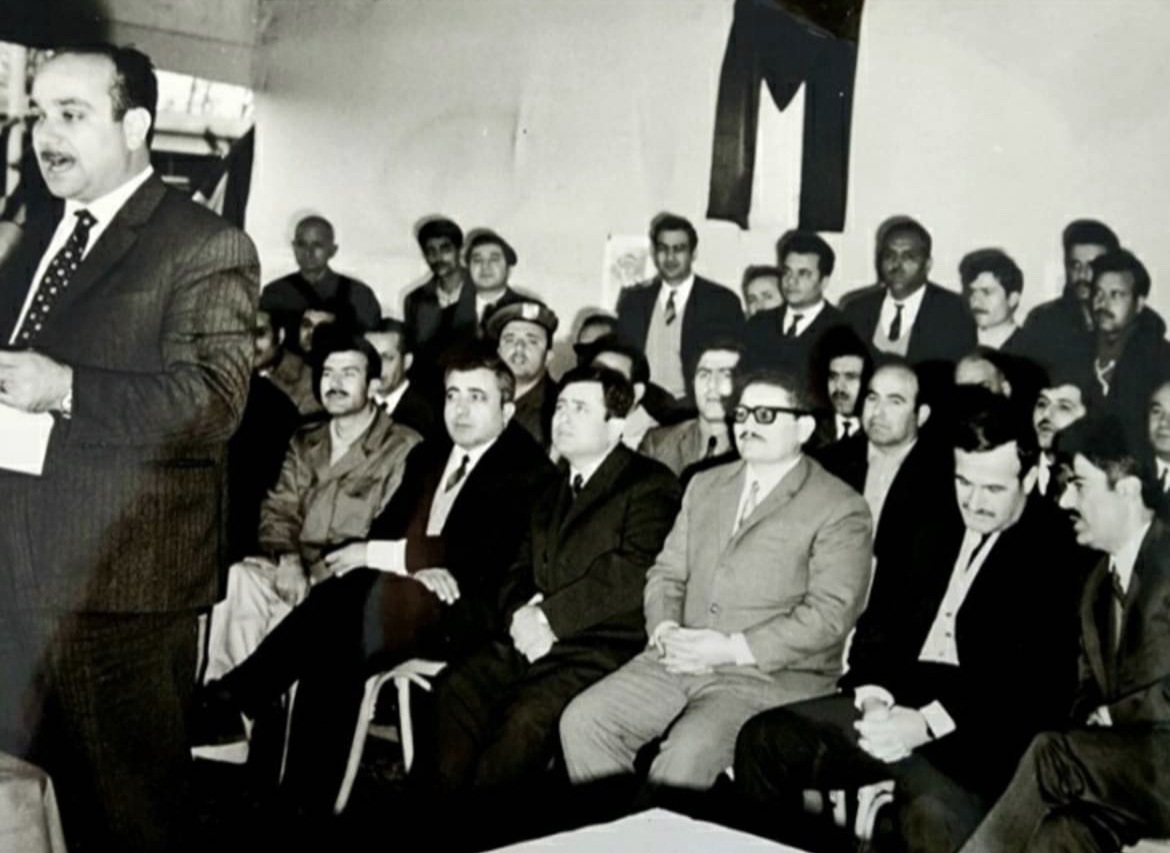
Ba'ath party meeting, 1970s

At the same time, the policy was aimed not only (although mainly) at political, but also "economic pluralism." Salah Jadid's legacy also included his very aggressive economic policies, which ultimately failed to lead to economic development. Therefore, when Assad came to power, he introduced the infiraj policy and this one. Ta'addudiyya policy, according to some sources, began to affect the economy in 1986, simultaneously with the return of infiraj and the introduction of austerity. This policy was aimed at greater stimulation of private investment, and also led to the abolition of government subsidies on a number of consumer goods, the liberalization of prices and trade. This policy has nevertheless managed to stimulate private companies to become more active in Syria.

Assad considered the public sector to be the main sector of the economy, but over time, slogans of "Ta'addudiyya" replaced this. In the economic sector, the policy was towards a greater balance between the public and private sectors and an increased role for joint ventures. With introduction of al-ta`addudiyya al-iqtisadiyya policy and re-introduction of infiraj, liberal economic reforms have become even stronger and deeper.

== See also ==
- Perestroika
- Infitah
- Infiraj
- Corrective Move
