= Revolution Protection Law =

Repressive law in Ba'athist Syria

- Territorial extent: Ba'athist Syria
- Effective: 7 January 1965
- Repealed: 8 December 2024 (de facto)
- Introduced by: Amin al-Hafiz
- Status: Repealed

Revolution Protection Law (also known as the Opposition of the Revolution Law or just Legislative Decree No. 6) was repressive political legislation in Ba'athist Syria, passed by the president Amin al-Hafiz in 1965 and prohibited any political and social activity aimed at undermining the "Ba'athist Revolution". Under that law, written or verbal opposition to the goals of the revolution and any resistance to the socialist regime was criminalized with penalties reaching life imprisonment or even execution. The law was not repealed until the fall of Ba'athism in Syria in 2024, after which it became de facto invalid due to the collapse of the regime that introduced it.

== Background ==
In 1963, Syria suffered a successful military coup by the Military Committee of the Ba'ath party. The coup brought the military to power, forming the National Council for the Revolutionary Command, which quickly started to consolidate power in the hands of the Syrian Ba'athists through a massive purges of non-Ba'athist groups (such as Nasserists) in the government and army. Immediately after the coup, the Ba'athists also introduced a number of repressive measures, including declaring martial law.

== Implementation ==
The Revolution Protection Law was adopted on January 7, 1965 (according to other sources, in 1964). The law prohibits any expression of opposition to the "aims Ba'athist Revolution" (Unity, Freedom, Socialism): according to this law, "resistance" to the goals of the revolution was punishable by imprisonment from 3 to 15 years, and actions "directed against the socialist system" could result in life imprisonment or the death penalty. Among other things, the law prohibits "publishing news aimed at shaking the people's confidence in the revolution." The Revolution Protection Law allows for the formation of military tribunals against individuals who "oppose the revolution of 1963:" it's established the creation of "special military courts to try political cases," which were replaced by the Supreme State Security Court (SSSC) in March 1968, established by Legislative Decree No. 47. Together with the martial law, the Revolution Protection Law was intended to help the Ba'athist regime stay in power. Thus, under this law, people who had contact with foreign groups that could "harm the March 8 revolution" or people who stole and distributed information that was supposed to be secret to ensure state security were punished.

Article 3(a) prohibits:

Acts which are considered contrary to the implementation of the socialist system in the state, whether they take place by action, speaking or writing or by any other means of expression or publication.

Article 3(c) prohibits:

Offenses against the security of the state.

Article 3(e) prohibits:

Opposition to the realization of unity among Arab countries, or opposition to or obstruction of any of the aims of the revolution by taking part in or inciting demonstrations, assemblies or riots, or by publication of false information with the intention of creating a state of chaos and shaking the confidence of the masses in the aims of the revolution.

== Criticism ==
The law was criticized by anti-Ba'athist opposition and law enforcement organizations for its vagueness and imprecision, which meant that almost anyone could involuntarily violate it. Thus, under this law, any group not belonging to the Ba'ath Party or (since 1972) the National Progressive Front (a coalition of leftist parties controlled by neo-Ba'athists) can be charged with such things as carrying out activities opposed to the socialist system of the state and revolution (Articles 3, and Articles 4 of Legislative Decree No. 6). Among those subject to detention and arrest were human rights activists accused (under the same law) of participating in activities contrary to the goals of the Ba'athist revolution. During the law's existence, a significant number of opposition or human rights activists were detained because they "posed a threat to the revolution": often, activists were arrested under this law at random and often without any trial at all. The law was criticized for its repressive nature, which prohibited any dissent and any opposition to Ba'athism. There were demands for the repeal of the law and the abolition of military courts. National Coalition of Syrian Revolutionary and Opposition Forces declared the law invalid, along with other repressive Ba'athist laws.

== Abolition ==
Ba'athist government never abolished Revolution Protection Law. But with beginning of Syrian civil war, in 2015, opposition forces declared abolition of this law on the territories under its control.

== See also ==
- Terrorism in Ba'athist Syria
- Human rights in Ba'athist Syria
- Economic Sanctions Law
- Law No. 49
