= Economic Sanctions Law =

1966 to 2013 law in Ba'athist Syria

- Territorial extent: Ba'athist Syria
- Effective: May 16, 1966
- Repealed: March 17, 2013
- Introduced by: Salah Jadid
- Status: Repealed

The Economic Sanctions Law (also known as the Economic Penal Code or just Decree No. 37), was a political law, issued in Ba'athist Syria in 1966 by the Salah Jadid's regime. The economic sanctions law prohibited the removal of foreign currency or other monetary assets from Syria in any significant quantities, as well as leaving the country without special permission, negligence at work or damage to factory equipment, under penalty of imprisonment.

== Background ==
Since 1963, the socialist Ba'ath Party had ruled Syria, implementing a Soviet-inspired five-year plan system in the economic sphere. In February 1966, another military coup took place, bringing to power a radical branch of the party known as neo-Ba'athists. General Salah Jadid, who had strong communist and Marxist leanings, became the leader of Syria. The coup interrupted the Second Five-Year Plan, begun in 1965, and marked a radical change in its nature: due to such a sharp change in policy towards a more radical direction, some documents indicate 1966 as the beginning of the Second Five-Year Plan.

The Jadid's regime officially "continued" to implement the plan, albeit more radically. To protect underdeveloped state-owned enterprises, officials during the Second Five-Year Plan period introduced strict restrictions and increased duties on imported goods; for example, in January 1967, a ban was imposed on the import of almost all foreign luxury goods into Syria. At that time, permitted imports had to be channeled exclusively through state-owned enterprises. However, by early 1967, this policy of developing state-owned enterprises had already encountered serious difficulties, primarily related to a severe capital shortage. In an attempt to solve these problems, the government only expanded state control over industry and trade. The Council of Ministers issued a wide range of decrees that transferred all wholesale trade under state control: private wholesalers were arrested. The government-controlled "Supply Board" was responsible for distributing basic consumer goods such as vegetable oil to the domestic market - already in early May 1966, security forces arrested 45 of Damascus's largest merchants, and the party newspaper al-Ba'ath dubbed them "Syria's Biggest Capitalists" and accusing them of undermining economic well-being of Syria. Around the same time, the government confiscated all real estate and froze the assets of other members of the trading elite. Basic consumer goods were rationed by the government in accordance with decrees signed at the end of May 1967. Sometimes this reached the point of absurdity: for example, it was forbidden to transport flour from one governorate of the country to another without obtaining a special permit.

== Implementation ==
At May 16, 1966, the government introduced the Decree No. 37. The law consisted of 39 articles that defined punishment for so-called "economic sabotage" - this concept included the transfer of large amounts of money and assets outside Syria, favoritism of government officials, negligence in work, and sabotage of equipment and machines in factories and plants. The scope of the law was very broad - it affected most workers or officials.

Punishments for negligence ranged from 6 months to 2 years in prison. The punishment for intentionally damaging manufactured goods or factory equipment, evading or refusing to implement state projects and infrastructure, disclosing secret data regarding production and five-year plans, or poor economic planning is generally 15 years in prison or hard labor. However, the law also allows a person who damaged the factory equipment/manufactured goods to pay a fine (double its price) instead of 2 years in prison. For transferring currency or assets outside of Syria, the person also faced a 15-year prison sentence. As stated in the law, "an attempt to commit such crimes draws the same punishment as commission of the crime". Also, in accordance with this law, the departure of government officials from Syria without special permission or the failure to return Syrian students receiving government-funded training/internships abroad is also a crime. The law also punishes people who violate the production plan established by the state with forced labor.

This was the first economic crime law in the Arab world. The government passed the law to, as it put it, for protect the "progress on the road to socialism."

== Abolition ==
The law was repealed on 17 March 2013, as it was replaced by Law No. 3 of 2013 (that also called the Economic Criminal Code), which was passed on the same day.

== See also ==
- Law No. 49
- Revolution Protection Law
