= Infiraj =

Policy of economic liberalization in Ba'athist Syria

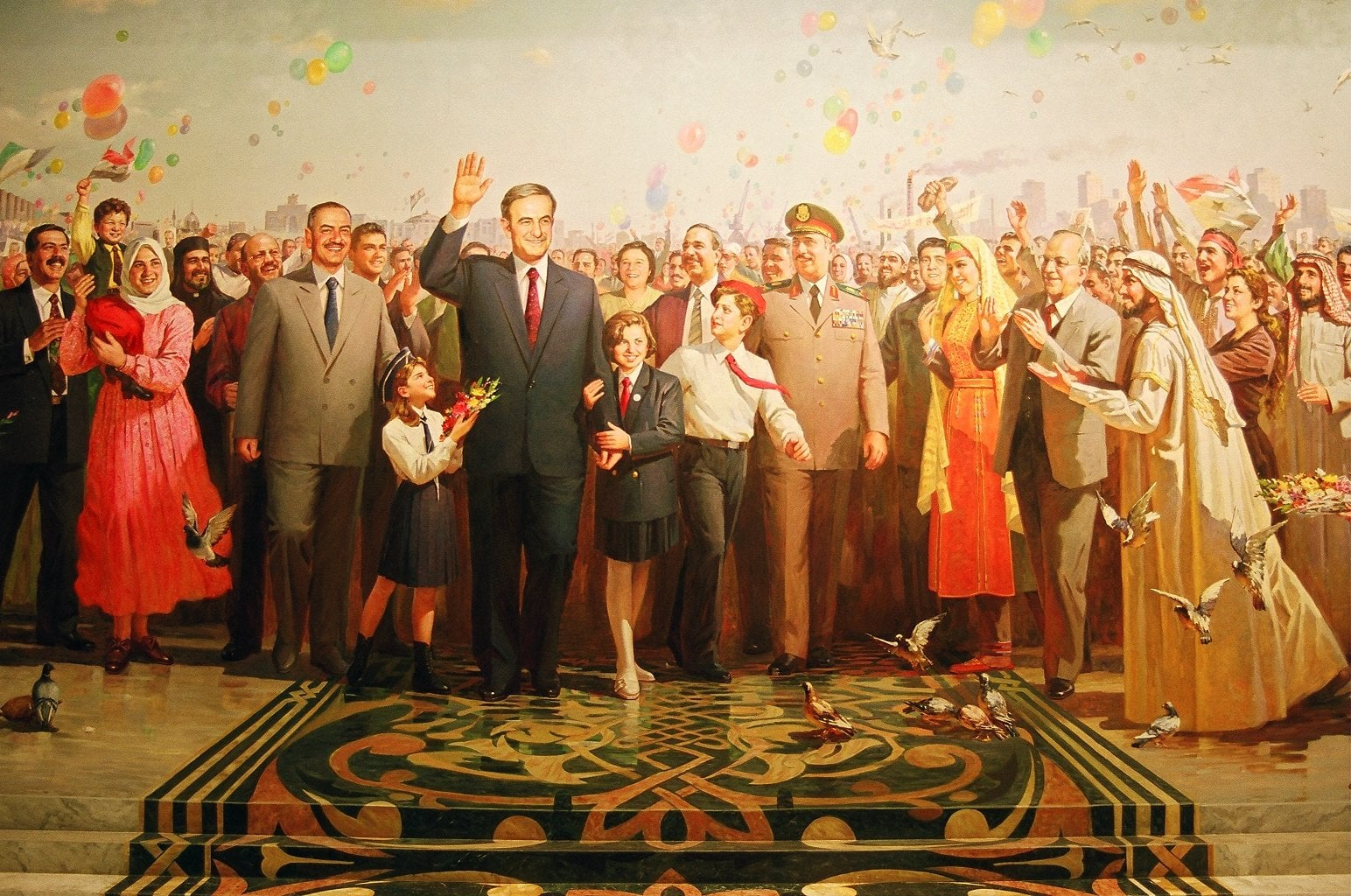
A socialist realist painting of President Hafez al-Assad surrounded by a loving crowd at the October War Museum, 1985

In the context of Syria, al-Infiraj (also known as intifah) refers to the socialist policy of economic liberalization announced by President Hafez al-Assad shortly after coming to power in 1970. Infiraj was part of Assad's broader, all-encompassing reform campaign known as the Corrective Movement program. While the Infiraj policy did bring some liberalization, it did not mark a shift in Syria away from its socialist economy, which centered on five-year development plans, inspired by a Soviet example—management remained strictly centralized in the hands of the ruling Ba'ath Party, with the public sector dominating the private sector, which still faced a number of restrictions. Infiraj was considered to be quite successful overall, as Syria experienced significant economic development during the 1970s. However, it was claimed that the infiraj policy reforms were less extensive than those in Tunisia and Egypt. The main architect of the Infiraj policy was the US-educated Syrian economist Dr. Muhammad al-Imadi, who was the Minister of Economy at the time.

== Background ==
Before Hafez al-Assad came to power, Ba'athist Syria was effectively ruled by General Salah Jadid. He held very radical, Marxist-Leninist views and pursued radical and aggressive policies within the country. Jadid was the most radical and repressive ruler in modern Syrian history: he reorganized the security services, confiscated goods from merchants, aggressively imposed atheism on a strongly religious population, and supported anti-government groups in several Middle Eastern countries. Jadid's actions have left Syria facing the immigration of professionals and scientists, an economic crisis, and a high level of isolation from the rest of the region. Economic problems led to widespread popular discontent with Jadid's rule and many demonstrations, especially in 1968-1969, which always ended in clashes with security forces.

Assad, like Jadid, was a neo-Ba'athist, but he supported a more pragmatic and soft policy (which later became known as the Assadism). After the Six-Day War, differences between Assad and Jadid intensified. Ultimately, in November 1970, the so-called Corrective Revolution occurred, which overthrew Jadid and removed all his protégés from power. Assad's rise to power was greeted largely with relief, as he promised easing reforms that eventually resulted in the Corrective Movement program and the infiraj policy. Some sources mark 1970 as the beginning of Infiraj policy, while others mark 1973.

Assad and his domestic allies did not abandon the ideas of Arab socialism, but they believed the price of abruptly implementing the radical measures implemented by Jadid was too high. They wanted to implement programs and campaigns that would reduce the country's isolation and the damage caused by neo-Ba'athist policies. Assad also needed political and economic stability to stay in power longer than all his predecessors had, so he had many arguments for introducing such a policy.

== Introduction ==
Shortly after the coup, Assad announced the launch of the Corrective Movement program and the infiraj "open door" policy. Infiraj was primarily aimed at attracting foreign investment to Syria for economic development. Technocrats from so-called Higher Economic Council were responsible for developing the infiraj policy, many of whom later became part of the state elite and Hafez al-Assad's inner circle. The infiraj policy sometimes divided into two phases: the first was between 1973 and 1981, and the second from 1986 until the end of Hafez al-Assad's rule.

=== First infiraj (1973-1981) ===
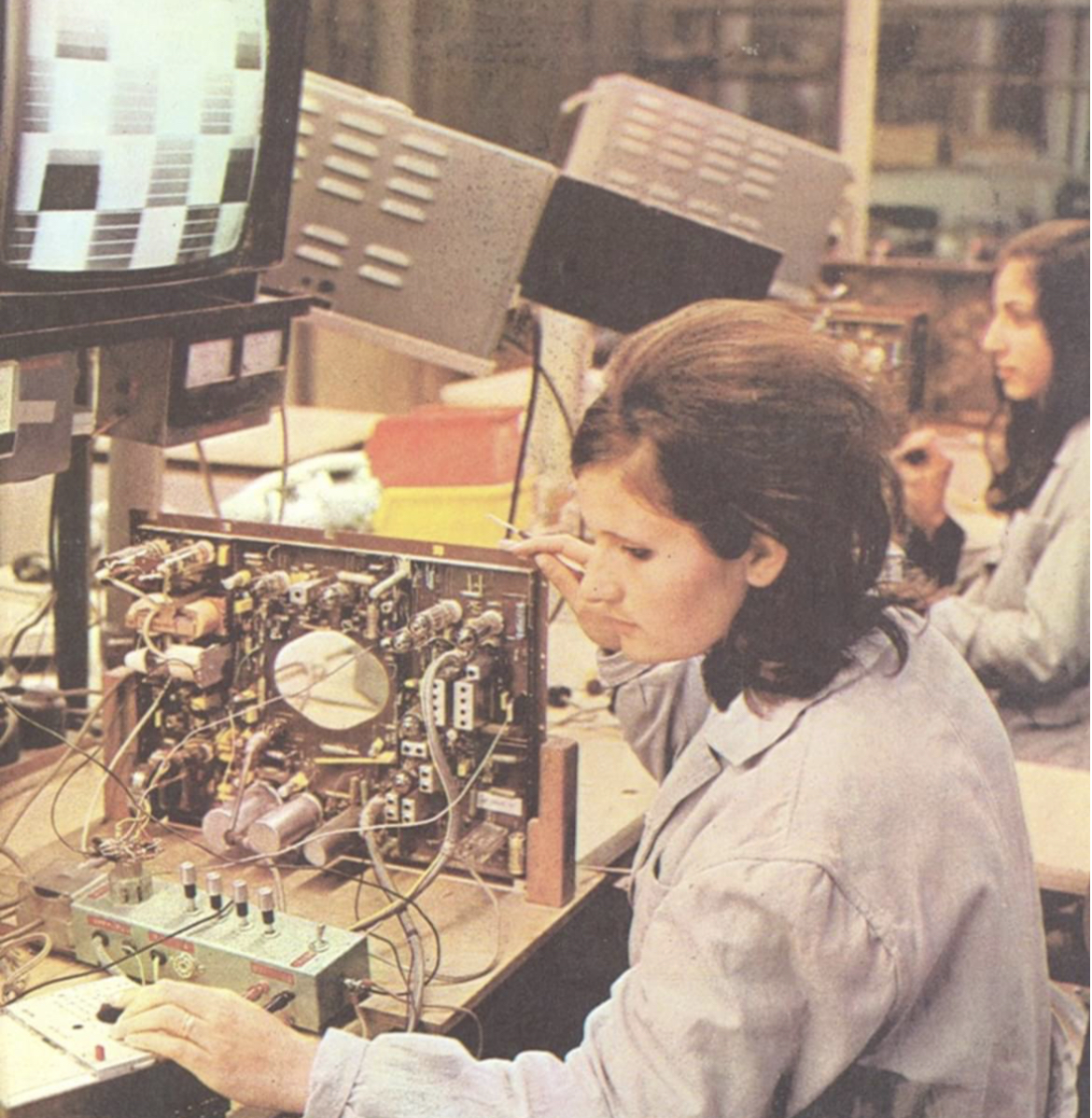
Assembling televisions at the Syrian Arab Electronics Industry Company factory, 1973

This policy received widespread support from entrepreneurs and businessmen who suffered severe economic losses as a result of the harsh nationalization policies of the mid- and late-1960s. The policy of infiraj was also supported by the majority of members of al-Jama'a (the most powerful political elite in Syria, the one most personally close to Assad).

Due to the policy of infiraj, so-called "Free Zones" emerged in Syria – special economic territories where private companies could operate under favorable conditions. The policy also encouraged entrepreneurs, as well as limited privatization in the service and trade sectors. Sources citing 1973 as the beginning of the infiraj policy claim that it was triggered by the Yom Kippur War, which resulted in damage to Syrian infrastructure, with restoration costs estimated at $4.5 billion. For this reason, the infiraj policy aimed to create favorable conditions for private corporate investment, which would be used not only for general development but also for repairing the aftermath of the war. The external economic support provided by the infiraj helped Syria recover very quickly. For the same reason, Syria was able to achieve very good development indicators in its third five-year plan (1971-1975). Assad soon allowed government lending programs for small businesses to begin, and state control over trade gradually weakened.

=== Abolition ===
In the late 1970s and early 1980s, the policy of infiraj was abandoned and Hafez al-Assad reinstated the war Leninism, analogous of the earlier Jadid regime. During these years, Syria implemented the fifth five-year plan, which continued the fourth plan's goal of consumer self-sufficiency and Syria's autarky. For this reason, the government introduced strict restrictions on the import of goods and regulations of commercial economic sector. Private companies faced new restrictions and government policies to weaken them, such as the redistribution of raw materials from them to state-owned enterprises.

=== Second infiraj (1986-2000) ===
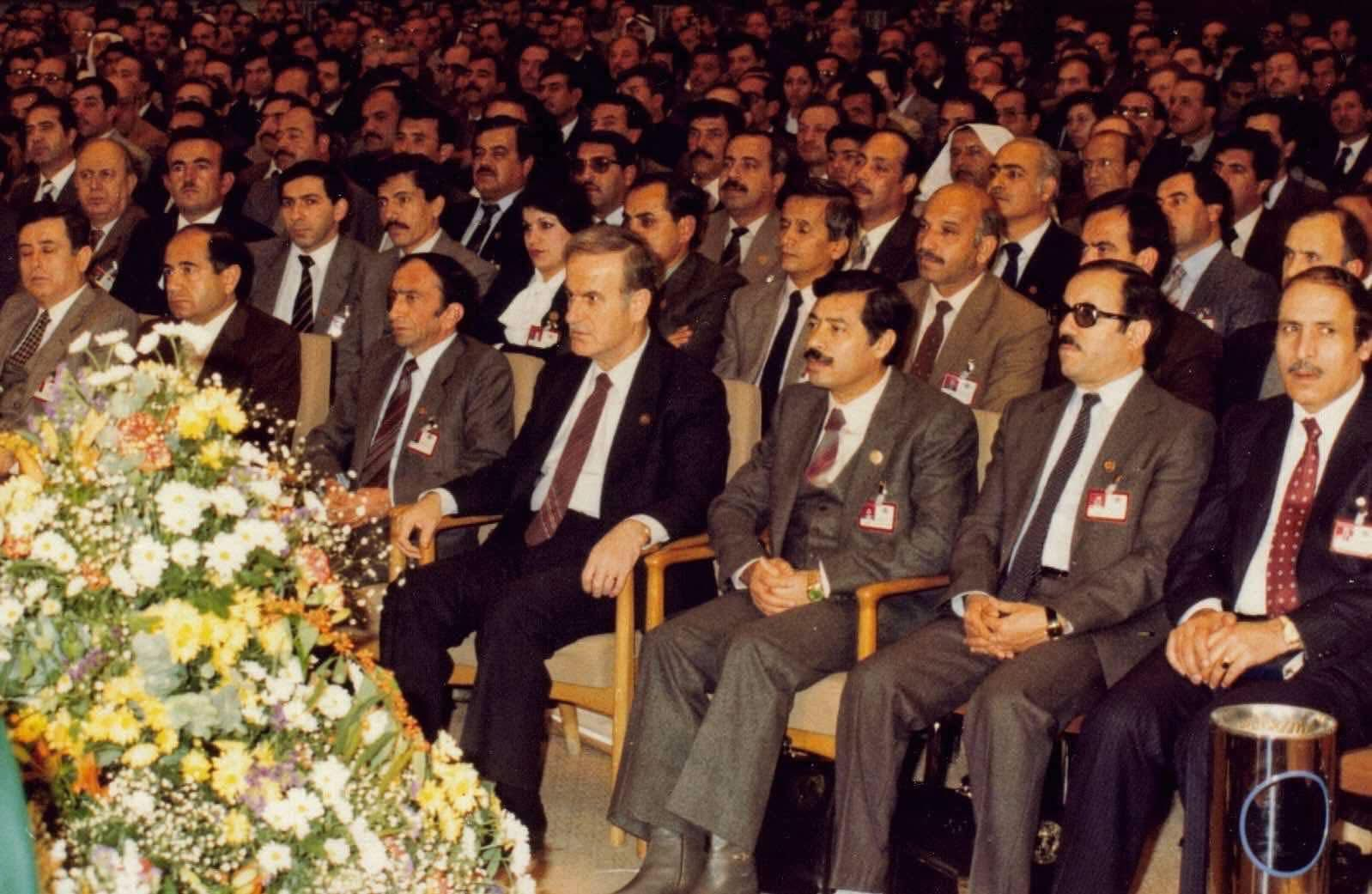
Eighth Regional Congress, 1985

At the eighth regional congress of the party, held in January 1985, a number of issues were discussed, including economic problems, and on this issue, at the congress, officials came to the conclusion that there was a need for new economic liberalization. In April 1985, the new deputy minister of economy announced that the government had launched a new campaign to attract foreign and private capital. In 1986, Syria, facing increasing isolation from the entire Arab world and suffering economic problems, declared austerity policy. The trade deficit was widening, and the country was short of capital, so the government again adopted sweeping measures to curb inflation (leading to the adoption of Law No. 24, which banned foreign exchange transactions) and attract foreign investment, and the policy of infiraj returned.

In 1987, the cabinet underwent major changes in its personnel—most of the top positions were filled by new people who were supporters of reformism. For example, the successful agronomist Dr. Mahmoud Zuabi became prime minister. The technocrats who planned the infiraj policy demanded that President Assad achieve better relations with the US and Europe so that they could gain more access to their markets, and Assad agreed with them, managing to establish better relations with them. In this regard, the number of private enterprises and the projects they implemented grew rapidly in the late 1980s and 1990s.

A new series of reforms was introduced by Imadi and other technocrats. During this period, state subsidies for consumer goods were sharply reduced, and the private sector and the bourgeoisie were encouraged to participate more actively in economic development. In 1986, Legislative Decree No. 10 was passed, allowing private companies to retain 75 percent of all profits. In the 1990s, another round of laws was passed that ultimately eased restrictions, fines, and taxes on private businesses.

== Aftermath ==
Infiraj's policies did not lead to the transformation of the Ba'athist economy into a capitalist one, but they liberalized it enough for the Ba'ath Party regime to survive when socialist and communist regimes were collapsing in the rest of the world. Syrian propaganda confidently and regularly asserted that the path chosen by the Syrian Ba'ath Party was the only correct one, so what was happening to other socialist governments around the world had nothing to do with Syria. As Tishreen newspaper stated:

The collapse of the regimes that used to call themselves socialist in Eastern Europe does not mean the end of socialism and the collapse of socialist thinking. Rather it signals the collapse of a pattern of socialist practice that will be rightly judged and assessed by history... The importance of the Corrective Movement led by struggler Hafez al-Assad can be seen. This movement advanced the principle of political and economic pluralism almost two decades ago. It also devised methods for political and social development that proved capable of withstanding the toughest foreign pressures.

This policy, however, led not only to economic development but also to the gradual formation of a "New Class" (al-Tabaqa al-Jadida), also known as the "velvet generation" —a small group of extremely wealthy and influential individuals close to the government. The New Class benefited greatly from the infiraj policy and grew immensely wealthy as a result.

== See also ==
- Ta'addudiyya
- Infitah
- New Economic Policy
- Perestroika
- Reform and opening up
