= Fourth Five-Year Plan of Ba'athist Syria =

Economic and social development plan in Syria (1976–1980)

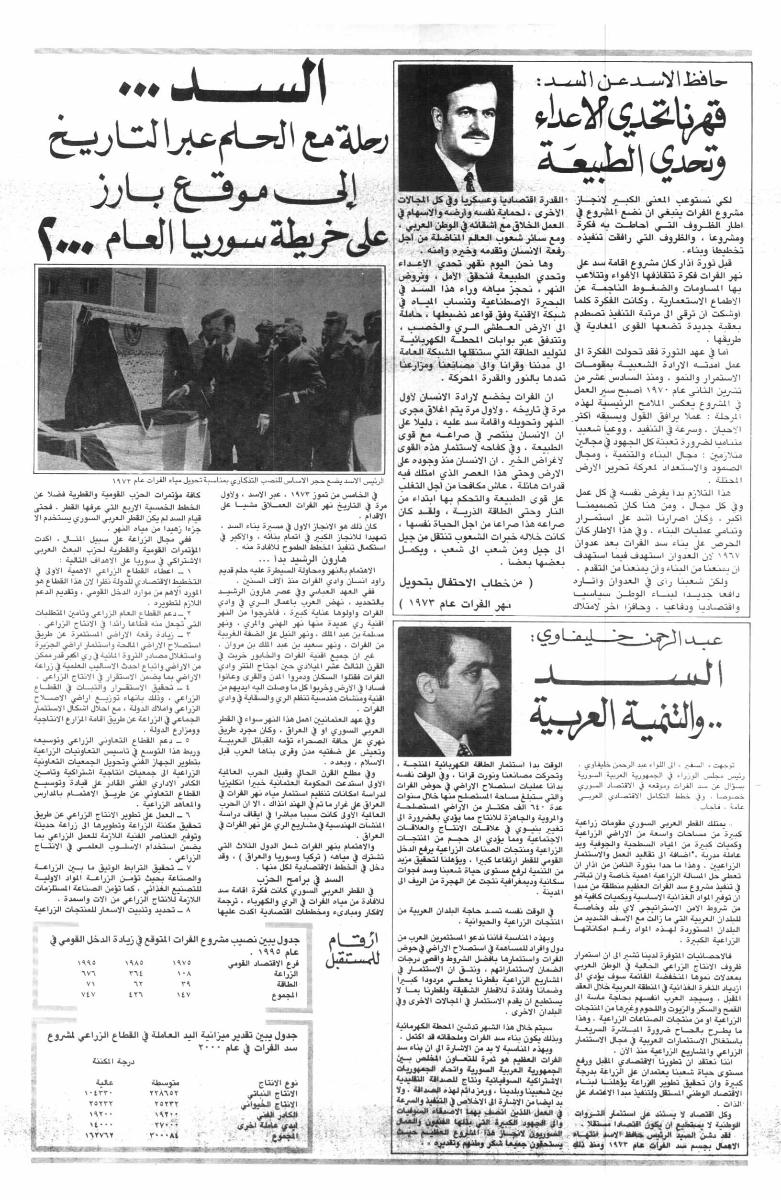
A Syrian newspaper announces the opening of a major new power plant built during the Fourth Plan at the Tabqa Dam, 1978

The Fourth Five-Year Economic and Social Development Plan was adopted by the government of Ba'athist Syria in 1976 and was in effect until 1980. One of the main goals of the plan were to continue import substitution of consumer goods begun in the Third Five-Year Plan, reduce import levels, industrialize through an ambitious industrial development campaign, and fully enroll children in schools. The Fourth Five-Year Plan was formulated in response to the failures of the Third and the shortage of agricultural produce.

== Background ==
=== Five-Year Plan system ===
The Ba'ath Party continued to implement the Five-Year Plan system immediately after coming to power in 1963. In 1970, General Hafez al-Assad came to power and launched a comprehensive reform campaign known as the Corrective Movement. The Third Five-Year Plan began in 1971.

=== Third Five-Year Plan ===
The third five-year plan proved to be very successful – the Syrian economy grew significantly. One of the main pillars of the plan was the so-called infiraj - a policy aimed at liberalizing the economy after the aggressive policies of Assad's predecessor, the Marxist Salah Jadid. As a result of the plan, the Assad government was able to improve living standards and complete major infrastructure projects such as the Tabqa Dam (what was one for the main goals). However, periodic inefficiencies in economic management led to underutilization of capacity, and the deficiencies in coordination and planning persisted. The construction infrastructure sector experienced a boom in 1973–1976, but it was still not enough to provide urban housing for the entire population. However, in any case, Syria's investment and industrial opportunities have increased significantly thanks to the public sector.

During the plan, demand for education also increased sharply: new enrollment growth at all school levels ranged from a 43 percent increase to a 65 percent increase—tertiary enrollment increased by 66 percent, in period between 1970 and 1976.

=== Sixth Regional Congress ===
In 1975, the Sixth Regional Congress of the Ba'ath Party took place, where the future five-year plan and the desired goals were discussed: the focus was on the goal of self-sufficiency for Syria, which was to be achieved through the construction of an agro-industrial economy. Complete self-sufficiency in food and clothing was to be achieved, and its increase in the production of other goods, such as energy or equipment for agricultural production. During this congress, the main recommendations and guidelines for the next plan were adopted. Below is a list of National Development Goals set at the congress as taken from the 1980 report, Syria, Agricultural Sector Assessment:

- "Full employment for Syrian manpower".
- "Develop commodity production to increase its proportion in the Net Domestic Product".
- "Develop the services producing sectors so as to keep them in line with commodity producing sectors".
- "Expand relations with other countries to ensure: outlets for surplus domestic production and sources for modern equipment needed in investment projects, inputs, and final consumption goods".
- "Establish an agricultural-industrial economy, stressing: increased livestock and crop production; establishments for processing agricultural products; projects aimed at import substitution; and greater supplies of consumer goods for the domestic market".
- "Establish industrial plants for wider use of mineral and semi-mineral resources".
- "Establish facilities to use water resources for irrigation and for generation of electricity".
- "Ensure coordination and cooperation among the different economic sectors, and determine the amount of investment for each according to their needs".
- "Improve the transportation and communication sector to solve problems resulting from the shortage of vehicles for persons and production. Provide trained and skilled manpower, and improve its productivity".
- "Improve productivity by increasing the utilization of recently built production facilities, by modernizing other production facilities, and by improving the technical skill of workers".
- "Select projects, coordinate them, and share in joint projects that will advance Arab economic cooperation".

== Goals ==
Throughout most of third plan, Syria's balance of payments was in surplus. Despite this, by the beginning of the Fourth Five-Year Plan the deficit was becoming noticeable: the trade balance continued to deteriorate, and imports began to grow faster than exports. Inflation was partly contained by government subsidies. However, its failed to prevent it completely and everywhere - for example, between 1975 and 1977, housing prices in areas that did not receive subsidies rose by 300 percent.

The plan also stated its desire to achieve greater equality (especially in rural areas) and a more fair and equal distribution of income, reducing the differences between rural and urban areas. Of all investments, 51 percent went towards completing projects carried over from the Third Five-Year Plan. The plan set out a series of ambitious "National Development Goals". The main objectives of the Fourth Five-Year Plan are as follows (copied from the "Syria, Agricultural Sector Assessment: Summary report"):

- To achieve a real annual average growth rate in Gross Domestic Product (GDP) of 12 percent (7.9 percent per capita).
- To establish a developed agricultural-industrial economy that will constitute a solid basis for stable self-development.
- To achieve optimal geographic distribution of projects among regions of the country so as to provide employment opportunities to rural manpower, and to improve rural living conditions and services.
- To seek full exploitation of natural, agricultural and mineral resources, and to protect and develop them.
- To provide optimal full employment, and mobilize rural manpower for developing idle agricultural resources and the rural areas in general.
- To achieve self-sufficiency in major food and clothing commodities, and increased degrees of self-sufficiency in other commodities.
- To raise nutritional standards of the population, especially in regard to high-quality foodstuffs.
- To provide self-sufficiency in energy as far as possible.
- To provide self-sufficiency in the means of agricultural production as far as possible, and move toward self-sufficiency in the means of industrial production.
- To develop the transport and communications networks internally, and externally, especially with the Arab countries.
- To speed up the gradual and voluntary replacement of individualism with cooperation in the sectors of agriculture, professions, housing, domestic trade and transport.
- To curb inflation, especially artificial inflation due to monopolistic practices.
- To achieve large increases in domestic financial resources, make then an increasing source of financing development, and improve the efficiency of the fiscal structure and of tax collection.
- To improve the systems of public administration so as to provide services to citizens at minimum cost and effort.
- To provide the trained personnel required for various economic activities, and gradually dispense with foreign expertese.
- To improve the balance of trade in consumer goods, and seek to achieve a surplus.
- To stabilize and develop local administration so as to foster democracy and popular participation in the buildings of a unified Arab socialist society.
- To reduce the difference between Mohafazats, and between cities and rural areas within the same Mohafazat, as to the economic and social condition of citizens.
- To ensure real and efficient participation in the efforts directed toward the improvement of society at the local level.
- To increase forested areas in all Mohafazat, and particular in those regions requiring a forest barrier between the steppe and agricultural areas; and to increase the area and productivity of fruit tree orchards.
- To expand the carpet and mat making industry so as to increase employment for women in poor rural areas.
- To build dams and irrigation networks in some Mohafazats in order to increase irrigated area, provide drinking water, animal watering, fish production, and prevent floods.
- To improve existing roads, and to build new roads in agricultural and steppe areas, with stress on roads that will link population centers and projects with the chief cities and towns, as well as with the main road network.
- To develop the educational system of the country (universities and institutes; pre-school, primary, preparatory, secondary and technical education; also cultural activities).
- To develop the health services of the nation (hospitals; health centers and clinics; health insurance).
- To expand construction of housing in the nation (public, cooperative, private), and to develop public utilities for drinking water and sewerage services.
- To develop social services in the nation (social welfare; social security; women's worker's and peasant's activities).

=== Industrialization and import substitution ===
The document of the plan consisted of 17 points. Near the end of the Third Five-Year Plan, the government formulated an ambitious program to dramatically accelerate Syria's industrial development, or industrialization. Its goals were largely formulated only in the final two years of the Third Plan and were therefore carried over into the Fourth Five-Year Plan. The plan aimed to significantly reduce the growth rate of imports of goods from abroad, despite the fact that the plan expected an increase in private investment. For example, Syria was supposed to become completely self-sufficient in terms of energy and agricultural products. This desire for gradual autarky was driven by the government's desire to be prepared for emergencies and unforeseen situations that could negatively impact the supply of goods to Syria. Already at the development stage in 1975, it became clear that the fourth plan would include 40 percent of the third, which had to be postponed. The plan included the assembly of at least 430,000 weaving looms, the construction of three canneries, four sugar factories, and even more dairies, three garment factories, two carpet factories, two cable factories, one iron smelter, one iron rod factory, several glass factories, one nitrogen fertilizer plant, one phosphate plant, and one each for paper and tire production. In total, 125 new factories were planned across the country.

As stated in the plan document, 81 medical centers were to be built during the project. The Ministry of Agriculture has developed their own plan for a future agricultural development program based on the plan, which aims to address the problems in the sector. The plan set a minimum requirement that water should be available to all settlements with a population of over 150 people. In the matter of irrigation, the expected rate of land development was 20,000-30,000 hectares per year. By the end of the plan, the target of irrigating an additional 240,000 hectares of land was to be achieved. It was planned to grow 60,000 hectares of sugar beet. It was also planned to improve the organization during the plan - to increase the efficiency of public administration and develop local regional administrations. The plan also called for expanding the number of so-called "Rural Development Centers"—special centers established back in 1959 during the unity with Egypt—designed to provide agricultural skills, medical care, and education to tens of thousands of people in rural areas. It was envisioned that at least one such center would be established in each region. In order to limit imports, the plan envisaged the potential introduction of austerity policies (however, this was implemented much later, only in the mid-1980s). Continuing Infiraj's policy required the government to also expand the tourism sector - the fourth plan envisaged allocations of 1.5 billion Syrian pounds in this direction.

=== Planned investments and growth ===
The planned investment for the Fourth Five-Year Plan was initially 70 billion Syrian pounds, but due to economic problems related to Syrian intervention in Lebanon and the reduction of economic aid from the Arab world, it fell to 54 billion or 13.8 billion US dollars. However, even despite this reduction, the planned investments were still astonishingly large: by comparison, in the third five-year plan they amounted to 20 billion Syrian pounds. Investments were distributed as follows: 21 percent went to agriculture (around 10.9 billion SPs), 23 percent to industry (around 12.1 billion SPs), 17 percent to the energy and oil sectors (around 9 billion SPs), 15 percent to transport and communications (around 7.9 billion SPs), and 24 percent to social development, such as healthcare or education (around 13 billion SPs). A very ambitious annual economic growth rate of 12 percent was forecast (2-4 percent higher than the third plan average) and 7.9 percent per capita: thus, the planned growth rate was estimated as one of the highest in the world. The planned annual growth of economic sectors was distributed as follows: transport and communications - 16 percent, construction and infrastructure - 16 percent, industry - 15 percent, agriculture - 8 percent. 33 percent of all investments (17.6 billion SPs) went into the construction of new projects. Third of these new projects had industrial and energy focus, another 44 percent were aimed at social development, and another 15 percent were included in the reserve list.

In August 1976, the cabinet of ministers was replaced by a new one, which was supposed to improve the efficiency of economic management and, in particular, the public sector of the economy. The draft plan, ready in 1975, was overly ambitious. In late 1976, government ministers reviewed a new revised version of the Fourth Plan and declared that many of its projected and targeted indicators, such as GDP growth, were simply unrealistic. There was a severe shortage of workers in the regions of northeastern Syria, which also affected the design of the fourth five-year plan – in part because of the shortage of workers, technical specialists and managers in some regions, it was considered too ambitious. For this reason, the plan was revised again, further lowering the bar that needed to be achieved. The official publication of the plan was first postponed until the beginning of 1976, and then until April 1977, when it was officially approved and published.

== Implementation ==
In connection with the crisis of 1976–1977 and the inability to formulate a working five-year plan, an emergency meeting of the party was convened for an urgent discussion of new goals and ways to achieve them, which should be included in the plan. The government tried to avoid excessive concentration of all industry in a few urban regions. Most officials supported industrialization, especially in rural areas.

=== Social development ===
Support for social development policies was based on the government's belief that labour productivity depended on them. Therefore, this campaign was particularly aimed at rural areas, where it was necessary to stop the outflow of labor. Investments in improving living standards in rural areas accounted for approximately 30 percent of all investments—this money was used to build infrastructure and expand rural residents' access to education and clean drinking water. These investments were driven by the government's acute problem of rural-to-urban migration. The poor quality of life in remote areas was not attractive. For example, in Raqqa Governorate, only 16 percent of the population had running water.

=== Agriculture ===
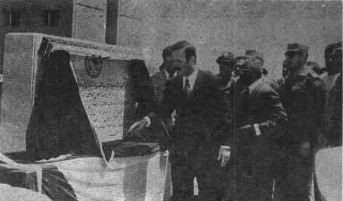
President Hafez al-Assad at the opening ceremony of the Tabqa Dam power plant, 1978

Since one of the most important goals of the plan was declared to be achieving self-sufficiency of the country in a number of supplies, the agricultural sector had to achieve such volumes of production that would allow the country to become independent in this area. About 83 percent of investments in this sector were directed towards increasing agricultural production through development and expansion of irrigated land suitable for planting. The planned annual investment in the agricultural sector was approximately 2.1 billion SP, but in reality only 57 percent of the planned allocation, or 1.2 billion, was achieved. Despite such poor performance in this sector, actual annual investment in others averaged 94 percent of planned levels, with industry, transport and energy, for example, ranging from 93 to 111 percent.

Despite the planned share of 21 percent of total planned investments, the actual average allocation of funds received from the total realized amount for the agricultural sector was 14 percent. Meanwhile, the industrial sector received more investment than originally planned – instead of the planned 23 percent, the figure was 30 percent. However, the expenditure of the funds received was also lower - on average 60 percent of the allocations, compared with 70 percent in the industry and energy sector. In 1978, on the anniversary of the March 8 Revolution, a large power plant was opened at the Tabqa Dam.

The official plan documents spoke of the desire to achieve full economic employment of the country's citizens and mobilize the workforce for the development of the agricultural sector. Employment opportunities in rural areas have expanded thanks to the regional distribution of the plan's projects. In the goal of achieving self-sufficiency, progress was made in the production of some consumer goods, such as eggs or vegetables, but for most other goods there was no decisive progress - their production either remained roughly the same or declined. Despite the stated goal of creating at least one RDC in each region, in reality there were only six of them in all of Syria - one each in Damascus (Harran al-Awamid), Aleppo (Ifreen), Latakia (Joubet Bourghal), Deir ez-Zor (Mayadin), Darayya (Nawa) and Suwayda (Salkhad). The Supreme Agricultural Council, established in 1975, developed an annual plan for each province, according to which local farmers were granted licenses to produce the specific products required by the plan.

=== Enrollment of all children in school ===
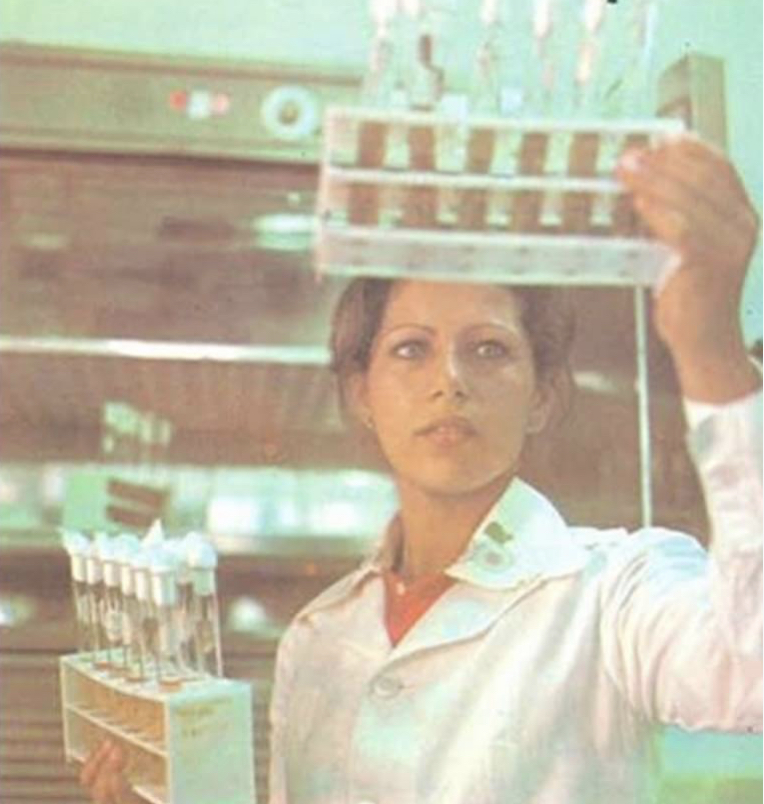
Woman working at a bottling plant in the city of Duraykish, 1977

Between 1975 and 1976, investment in education nearly doubled. In addition, the plan sought to change the balance between general and vocational education in favor of the latter, cultivating local specialists. The share of graduates from comprehensive schools was to decrease, while those from more vocational schools, on the contrary, was to increase. The plan called for a move towards greater vocational education. Investments in education in the plan were clearly allocated and defined. In terms of the amount of investment in vocational education from the total number of allocations, the leading settlements are Latakia (53 percent of total investment in the region), As-Suwayda (41 percent) and Deir ez-Zor (30 percent). One of another goals of the plan was to fully enroll boys in primary schools by its end in 1980 and to increase efforts to enroll all girls in primary schools by 1990. The desired targets were achieved: by the early 1980s, all boys and 85 percent of girls were enrolled in primary school. However, later secondary school enrolment dropped sharply, demonstrating high dropout rates. School enrollment in rural areas was lower than the national average.

=== Reaction to the Islamist uprising ===
In response to the Islamist uprising in Syria and the government's increased need for broader popular support, the Ba'ath Party's seventh regional congress was held in January 1980, at which the investments of the Fourth Five-Year Plan for the remaining year were adjusted - some of the previously unallocated expenditure was redirected to improving the lives of the peasants in order to secure their full support. Law No. 3 of April 1, 1980, on the determination of budgetary appropriations for the relevant year, noted that all state appropriations for the year not included in the fourth five-year plan are added there, adjusted to take into account the investments provided for by the same plan (Article 3 of the law).

== Aftermath ==
Despite financial support for the oil-producing states of the Persian Gulf and several revisions of the Fourth Five-Year Plan to reduce its expected results, the growth and development targets it set were still overly ambitious. Most officials agreed that the plan was too ambitious and included too many new and large projects. For this reason, the plan failed to fully achieve many of its objectives, although there were some successes. Based on this experience, the next, Fifth Five-Year Plan, set less ambitious and large-scale goals. The annual deficit of economic resources during the Fourth Five-Year Plan period increased to 13-18 percent, although in the previous one it was only 8 percent. Despite the desire to achieve 15 percent annual industrial growth, throughout the plan it never exceeded 10 percent, and in 1978 it reached a record low of 2 percent.

The Fifth Five-Year Plan also shifted its focus from industrial development to agricultural development in order to achieve greater success in Syria's independence from food supplies from abroad than in the Fourth Plan.
