= Fifth Five-Year Plan of Ba'athist Syria =

Development plan in Syria (1981–1985)

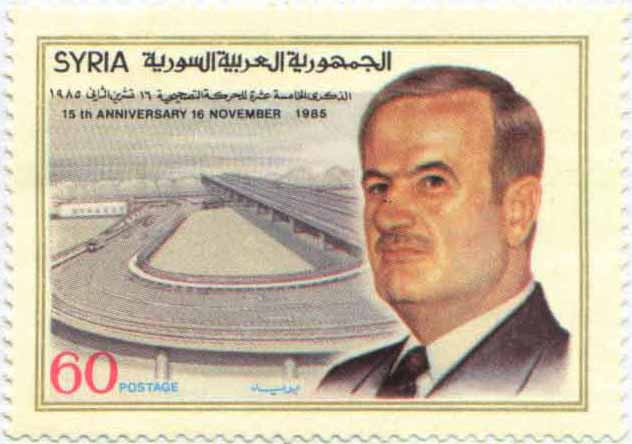
Postage stamp commemorating the 15th anniversary of the start of Hafez al-Assad's "Corrective Movement program," as well as the last year of Five-Year Plan, 1985

The Fifth Five-Year Plan for Economic Expansion and the Advancement of Society (also referred as the Fifth Five-Year Plan for Social and Economic Development) was adopted by the government of the Ba'athist Syria in 1981 and was in effect until 1985. Building on the failures and setbacks of the Fourth Five-Year Plan (1976–1980), the Fifth set less ambitious development goals. This plan also shifted its focus from industrialization to agricultural development, aiming to achieve greater progress in Syria's consumer self-sufficiency. The emphasis of the Fifth Five-Year Plan was on completing and utilizing with maximum efficiency already started/existing projects rather than on creating new ones.

== Background ==
The Fourth Five-Year Plan was announced in 1976. It set ambitious development goals, such as industrialization, achieving consumer self-sufficiency and annual GDP growth of 12 percent. The plan was revised several times due to its unrealistic nature, but the final version, published in 1977, was still excessive. The planned investments in the plan were reduced from 70 to 54 billion Syrian pounds, but even this figure was more than twice as high as, for example, the amount of investments in the previous, Third Five-Year Plan (20 billion). The plan largely failed due to its over-ambitious goals and the decline in foreign financial support associated with the Syrian intervention in Lebanon. During those years, Syria faced rising inflation: for example, house prices in some areas of the country rose by 300 percent between 1975 and 1977.

== Goals ==
The Fourth Five-Year Plan failed to achieve almost any of its goals. In this regard, the fifth plan set itself smaller goals. The draft plan was supposed to be made public in mid-1980, but this only happened in August 1981 (and published in 1982), after the plan had been revised by the government. However, the distribution of planned investments had not yet been published at that time (but later it was became known), while the details about planned projects were practically not published before and after this date. Tax revenues were expected to reach 15 percent of GDP by 1985 (up from 10 percent in 1980) and domestic savings were expected to increase annually by 10.9 percent.

The other main goals of Fifth Five-Year Plan were to reduce the balance of payments deficit that had widened as a result of the previous plan, increase exports by 6.5 percent (and maintain the annual growth rate of imports at 3.4 percent), create new jobs (an annual growth rate of 4.2 percent or 460,000 new vacancies), and have GNP grow annually by 8.5 percent and GDP by 7.7 percent. However, the emphasis was mainly on current expenditure rather than on investment (although the latter was supposed to grow by 6.6 percent annually). The investments were primarily intended to be used to complete projects that were unfinished in the previous Five-Year Plan.

By 1980, 54 percent of the rural population and 97 percent of the urban population had access to clean drinking water - the Fifth Plan envisaged increasing these figures to 67 and 100 percent, respectively. In 1980, planners of the Fifth Five-Year Plan also projected that oil revenues would fall from 1.65 billion US dollars to only 1.5 billion by the mid-1980s.

=== Planned investment and growth ===
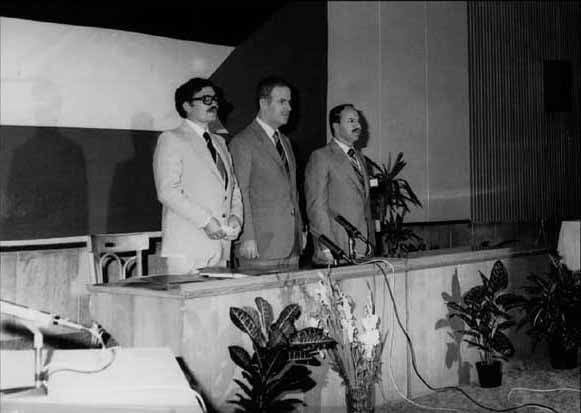
Ba'ath Party meeting, early-1980s

The planned investment amounted to 101 billion Syrian pounds (25 billion US dollars): only 20 percent of this amount was to be provided by the private sector (9.4 billion Syrian pounds). The distribution of expenditure by sector was as follows: agriculture received 17 billion Syrian pounds, mining and manufacturing received 27 billion, transport and communications received 12.8 billion, the financial sector received 18.4 billion, and the service sector 20.6 billion. Industry was expected to receive 12.2 percent of all investments and to grow by 15.3 percent annually, and agriculture by 7.8 percent. Agriculture received special attention in the plan, receiving at least 16.9 percent of all planned investments. Over five years, it was planned to achieve real GDP growth of 44.7 percent by 1980 standards. Planners hoped that the plan would reduce public and private consumption while successfully attracting foreign investment to Syria: investments were expected to grow by 8.9 percent annually.

== Implementation ==
=== Concentration of finances ===
As early as January 1981, the government began to reallocate funds and resources from the development of heavy industry to cover government expenditures in order to support the public sector of the economy. The plan's distribution of investments confirmed its shift away from industrialization and toward the development of the agricultural sector of the economy in order to achieve Syria's self-sufficiency in this area. Investments in 1981 went towards completing projects that had been postponed in the previous plan. In March 1981, the Council of Ministers passed Law No. 181 and Law No. 182, which obliged private importers to obtain loans exclusively from state-owned financial institutions and companies. The purpose of these decrees was to concentrate all finances, including private ones, in the hands of the state and reduce the growing flow of imports. Anyone who failed to comply with or attempted to circumvent these laws was arrested and charged with tax evasion and attempted smuggling.

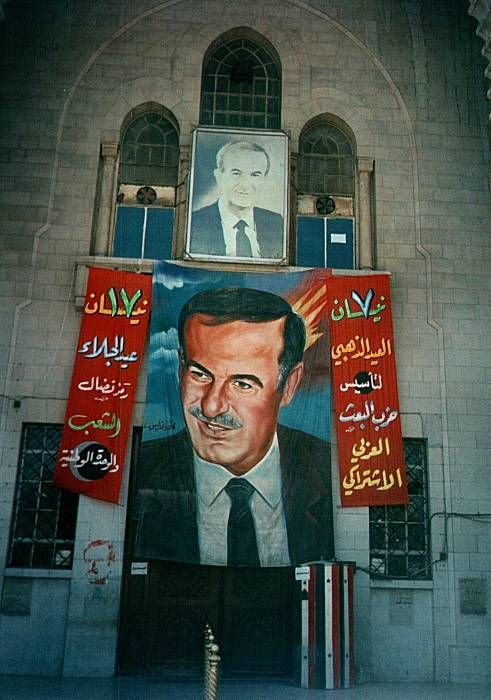
Portraits of Syrian president, Hafez al-Assad, in 1984

At the end of 1981, the government was going to reconsider its decision to create so-called free zones in a number of cities, since they, in the words of the Minister of Finance, "they have not brought tax benefits for the economy and have failed to attract foreign investment." Free zones were special economic zones created by the government in the early 1970s as part of a policy of economic and political liberalization. That was a zones where customs regulations do not apply and through which goods and services move without any restrictions. Taxes for private companies have been increased: the government also carried out a campaign to redistribute raw materials from private companies to state-owned ones.

Later in 1981, the so-called Committee for the Guidance of Imports, Exports, and Consumption was created. The committee's aim was to regulate the commercial sector of the Syrian economy - this alienated small producers and traders, leading to demonstrations against state intervention in the economy in the summer and autumn of 1981, mainly in the cities of Aleppo, Homs, Hama and Idlib. Infiraj policy (policy for economic relaxation introduced in 1970s) was cancelled and economy was "de-liberalized."

=== Agriculture ===
Due to the more agricultural focus of the plan, most of the investments and projects were outside urban areas, primarily in rural areas. Large sums were invested in expanding the production of goods that are very important for agriculture - pesticides, phosphates, and so on. The government offered favorable loan terms to anyone willing to support the introduction of greater mechanization in food production. A wide range of factories have undergone modernization, especially in the northeast of the country. The plan nevertheless led not only to the expansion of existing factories, but also to the construction of new ones – for example, sugar factories were built in Raqqa, Tell Salhab, Maskanah and Deir ez-Zor. Much attention was still paid to the development of irrigation and electricity networks in rural areas to solve the long-standing problem of rural immigration to cities due to poor living standards. Despite the set growth targets, the manufacturing industry and agriculture demonstrated rather weak development - for example, in 1983 the manufacturing industry grew by only 4.6 percent (instead of the planned 15.3), and in 1984 by only 3.2 percent. A similar situation was observed in the agricultural sector: in 1983, due to low rainfall, it grew by only 0.6 percent (instead of the planned 7.8), and in 1984 growth halved. GDP growth also did not meet expectations: instead of the planned annual 7.7 percent, in 1983 it grew by only 3.1 percent, and in 1984 by only 2.5 percent.

As a result of the Fifth Five-Year Plan policy, government agencies received significantly broader powers in the area of marketing agricultural products, setting priorities, and introducing more sophisticated methods of agricultural production. In 1984, further attempts were made to revive the agricultural sector of the economy - investments in it increased by 30 percent (for comparison, investments in industry increased by only 2.2 percent, and in the mining industry they fell sharply, by 33 percent). Government subsidies on diesel fuel, gasoline, and gas were drastically cut, and prices on a number of products were raised to stimulate agricultural production and sales. In addition, the government imposed severe restrictions on the import of industrial and technological goods.

=== Industry ===
The largest portion of the plan's successfully implemented production projects were weaving and spinning factories, and, unlike most of those built earlier, they were located not in standard large cities, but in peripheral regions such as Idlib or Hasakah. Among the largest cities, only Aleppo received even slightly significant investment in industry - this went towards the construction of a steel cable and cement factory. At the same time, the Military Housing Establishment signed a contract for the construction of a city warehouse for cotton seeds.

== Aftermath ==
A lack of foreign investment led to a slowdown in economic development, and Syria's isolation only intensified in the 1980s. Syria's monetary reserves (excluding gold) fell from 104 million US dollars to just 52 million by the end of 1983. The trade deficit persisted, but was reduced in 1984, from 5.5 billion Syrian pounds to 2.8 billion. In 1983–1984, there was a good cotton harvest, which led to its export almost doubling in value, from 544 million Syrian pounds to more than 900 million. Imports were strictly regulated by the government throughout the plan, which resulted in limited flow of important components and raw materials and, as a result, underutilization of plant and factory capacity. Instead of the planned growth of 44.7 percent, real GDP only fell during this period. Instead of the planned 8.9 percent annual investment growth, they grew by an average of only 2.9 percent, and government spending grew annually by 9 percent (instead of the planned 6.4). A number of economic sectors have failed to reach even close to the level of development originally planned, although electricity production and manufacturing still increased.

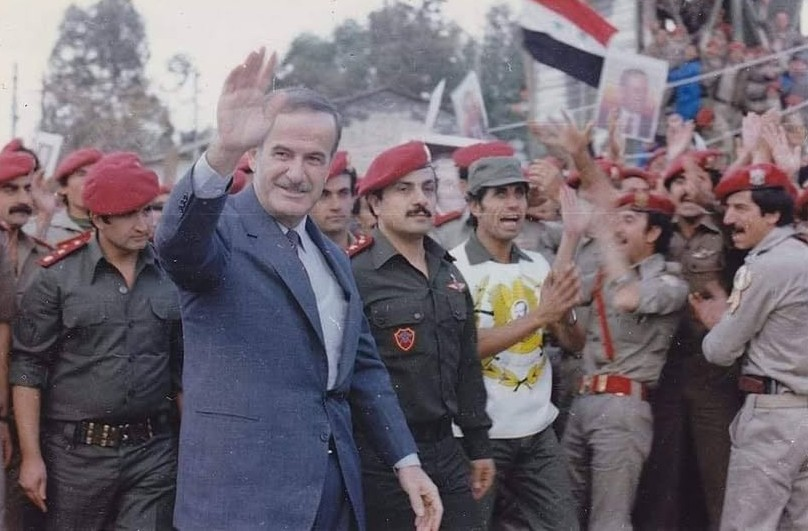
President Assad with the military in 1980s

Between 1982 and 1985, insufficient rainfall resulted in low crop yields and, consequently, reduced revenues from agricultural exports. Furthermore, electricity production at Syrian hydroelectric power stations declined, leading to shortages and regular power outages in major cities, which in turn negatively impacted the industrial sector. The crisis was also fueled by rising costs for security forces and government price controls, which periodically worsened commodity shortages. Problems with economic development were also linked to excessive military spending – in 1984, 55 percent of the entire annual budget went to defense. Since the mid-1980s, the government also had to rely increasingly on the private sector to develop the economy and reduce the role of the state in economic management. By the end of the plan, only 70 percent of the total planned investment had actually been realized. However, the plan's failures were also largely due to global events unrelated to the Syrian government, such as the fall in oil prices in the 1980s. This also affected the oil-producing countries of the Persian Gulf, which were forced to reduce the level of economic aid to Syria.

The Minister of Planning later admitted that in some development sectors only half of the set targets had been achieved, and in others even less, but in the area of social services 86 percent of the planned development had been achieved. However, the Minister of State for Planning Affairs, Abdul Rahim Al-Sbei’i, stated in his letter of July 2, 1999 that the plan had given impetus to the country's development because it had taken into account the population issue and had confirmed the link between demography and the socio-economic development of Syria.
