= Government of Ba'athist Syria =

Former central government of Ba'athist Syria

The Government of Ba'athist Syria, officially the Government of the Syrian Arab Republic, was the national government of Ba'athist Syria. It was formed following the neo-Ba'athist Military Committee's seizure of power in the 1963 Syrian coup d'état on 8 March 1963 and was abolished on 8 December 2024 following the fall of the Assad regime.

Under this system, the president served as the head of state, while the prime minister served as the head of government. Executive power was exercised by the government, while legislative authority was vested in the People's Assembly, a 250-member legislature. During the Syrian civil war, which began in 2011, the government fought against various domestic and foreign forces that opposed both the Syrian government and one another through shifting alliances. The seat of government was in Damascus, Syria. Ba'athist Syria was a unitary state with a centralized national government.

From the 1963 seizure of power by its neo-Ba'athist Military Committee until the fall of the Assad regime in 2024, the Arab Socialist Ba'ath Party ruled Syria as a totalitarian police state. (Note: Sources describing Syria as a totalitarian state: Khamis, B. Gold, Vaughn, Sahar, Paul, Katherine (2013). "22. Propaganda in Egypt and Syria's "Cyberwars": Contexts, Actors, Tools, and Tactics". In Auerbach, Castronovo, Jonathan, Russ (ed.). The Oxford Handbook of Propaganda Studies. New York, NY: Oxford University Press. p. 422. ISBN 978-0-19-976441-9.; Wieland, Carsten (2018). "6: De-neutralizing Aid: All Roads Lead to Damascus". Syria and the Neutrality Trap: The Dilemmas of Delivering Humanitarian Aid Through Violent Regimes. London: I. B. Tauris. p. 68. ISBN 978-0-7556-4138-3.; Meininghaus, Esther (2016). "Introduction". Creating Consent in Ba'thist Syria: Women and Welfare in a Totalitarian State. I. B. Tauris. pp. 1–33. ISBN 978-1-78453-115-7.; Sadiki, Larbi; Fares, Obaida (2014). "12: The Arab Spring Comes to Syria: Internal Mobilization for Democratic Change, Militarization and Internationalization". Routledge Handbook of the Arab Spring: Rethinking Democratization. Routledge. p. 147. ISBN 978-0-415-52391-2.) After a period of intra-party power struggles, Hafez al-Assad consolidated control following the 1970 coup d'état, establishing a political system that remained dominated by the Assad family for the next five decades. Under the 1973 Constitution, the Ba'ath Party was constitutionally designated as the leader of "society and the state". The Ba'athist government formally ceased to exist on 8 December 2024, when the Syrian Arab Army Command announced that its soldiers and officers were no longer in service following the fall of the Assad regime.

== Administration ==
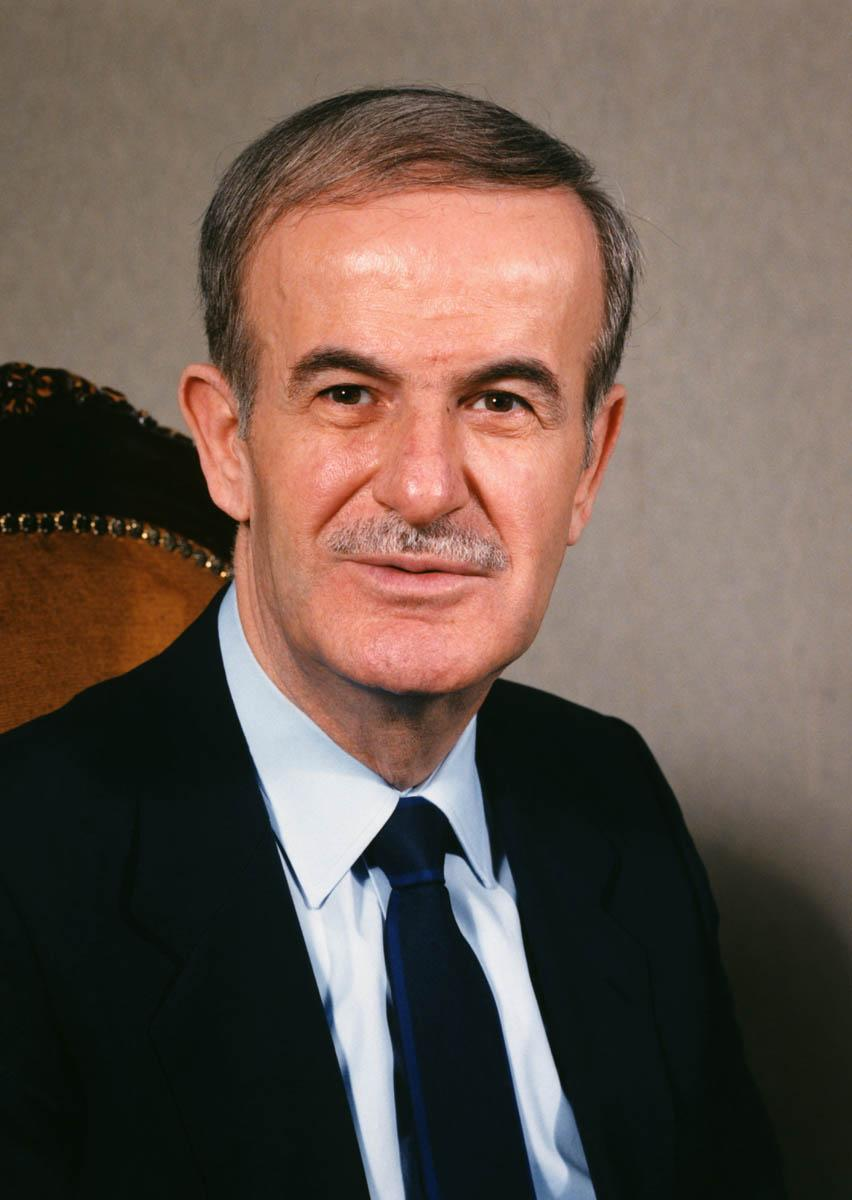
Hafez al-Assad was the president of Syria from 1971 until his death in 2000.

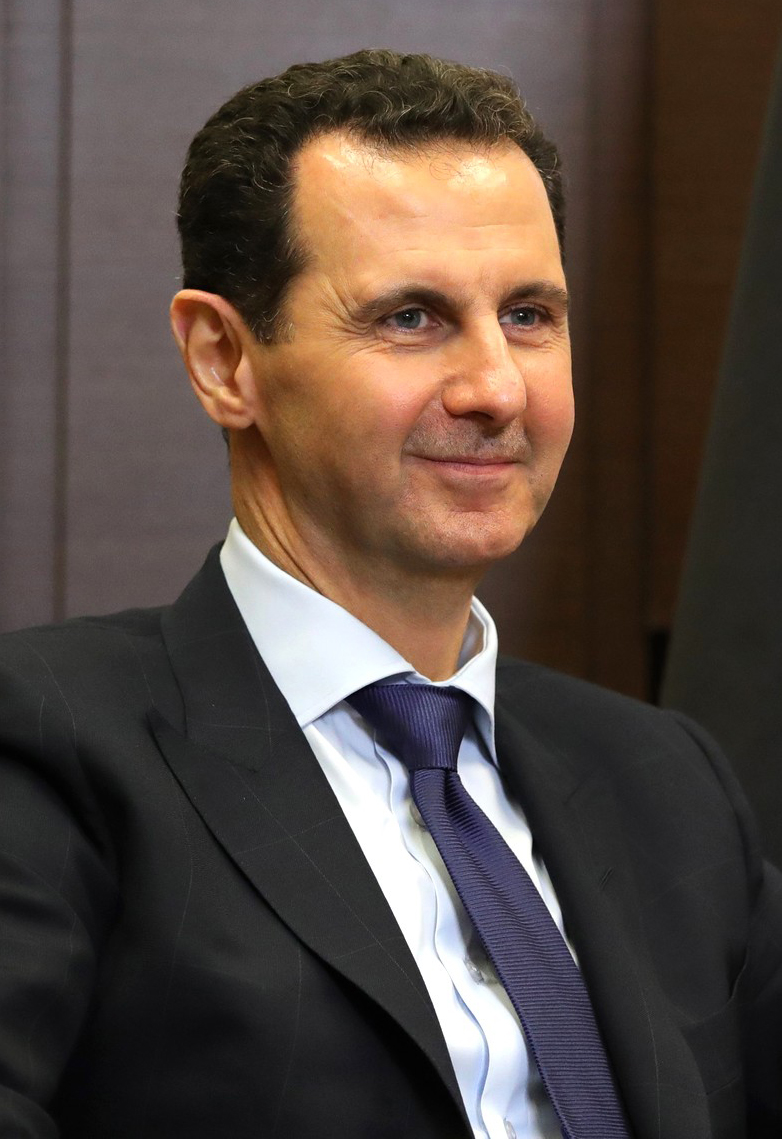
Bashar al-Assad was the president of Syria from 2000 until his fall in 2024.

The executive branch consisted of the president, two vice presidents, the prime minister, and the Council of Ministers (cabinet). The constitution required the president to be a Muslim. The Council of Ministers, or cabinet, consisted of 28 members and performed the day-to-day administrative functions of the government.

== Legislative branch ==
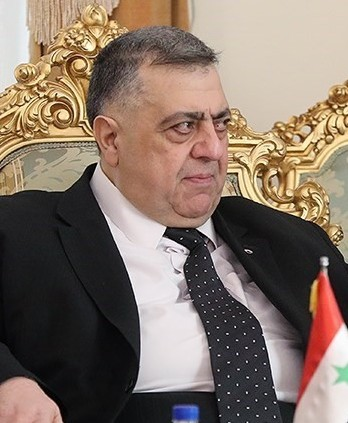
Hammouda Sabbagh was the last Speaker under the Ba'athist regime.

Following the 1963 coup, the People's Assembly largely served as a rubber stamp for the ruling Ba'ath Party.

The Ba'ath Party was the ruling party of Syria, and the 1973 Constitution stated that "the Arab Socialist Ba'ath Party leads society and the state." Of the 250 seats in the People's Assembly, at least 183 were reserved for the National Progressive Front, a Ba'ath Party-dominated coalition comprising nine other satellite parties loyal to Ba'athist rule. The remaining seats were occupied by independent candidates nominated by the Ba'ath Party.

The 2012 elections, held on 7 May, resulted in a new parliament that, for the first time in four decades, was nominally based on a multi-party system. The opposition was represented by the Popular Front for Change and Liberation, which won six seats. It later boycotted the 2016 elections because the government had not upheld its pledges to seek constitutional amendments and pursue political negotiations. In 2016, Hadiya Khalaf Abbas, who had represented Deir ez-Zor since 2003, became the first woman elected as Speaker of the People's Assembly, while in 2017, Hammouda Sabbagh became the first Syriac Orthodox Christian to hold the post.

Following the fall of the Assad regime on 8 December 2024, the People's Assembly issued a statement describing the event as a "historic day in the lives of all Syrians" and pledged to uphold the rule of law without discrimination. The statement featured the new coat of arms of Syria, accompanied by the Syrian opposition flag. On 11 December, the Ba'ath Party announced the indefinite suspension of all its activities. The following day, the Syrian caretaker government suspended both the People's Assembly and the constitution for a three-month transitional period. The People's Assembly was formally dissolved on 29 January 2025, when the Syrian transitional government announced plans to establish an interim legislative council.

== Judicial branch ==
There was no independent judiciary in Ba'athist Syria, as all judges and prosecutors were required to be Ba'ath Party appointees. The judicial branch consisted of the Supreme Constitutional Court, the High Judicial Council, the Court of Cassation, and the State Security Courts. The Supreme State Security Court (SSSC) was abolished by President Bashar al-Assad through Legislative Decree No. 53 on 21 April 2011. Ba'athist Syria had three levels of courts: courts of first instance, courts of appeal, and the Supreme Constitutional Court, which served as the highest constitutional tribunal. Religious courts adjudicated matters of personal status and family law.

== Dissolution of the Ba'athist government ==
The 2024 Syrian opposition offensives were led by Hay'at Tahrir al-Sham and supported by allied Turkish-backed groups in the Syrian National Army. The offensives resulted in the rapid collapse of the Ba'athist government, ending more than five decades of Assad family rule, which began when Hafez al-Assad assumed power in 1970 following a coup d'état under the Ba'ath Party.

Following the fall of the Ba'athist government, the Syrian Arab Army Command announced to its soldiers and officers that they were no longer in service as of 8 December 2024, declaring that the government had ceased to exist. Certain officials of the dissolved government, including Prime Minister Mohammad Ghazi al-Jalali, remained in Damascus and pledged to cooperate with the opposition. On 29 January 2025, during the Syrian Revolution Victory Conference, Hassan Abdul Ghani, the spokesman for the Military Operations Command, announced the repeal of the 2012 Syrian constitution.

== See also ==
- Politics of Syria

== Notes ==
Previous: Second Syrian Republic	Government of Ba'athist Syria; 1963–2024	Next: Government of Syria; 2024–present
