= Politics of Syria =

Politics of Syria سياسة سوريا
- Emblem of Syria
- Polity type: Unitary presidential republic under a provisional government
- Constitution: Constitutional Declaration; 13 March 2025; 19 months ago
- Formation: 8 December 2024; 22 months ago

Legislative branch
- Name: People's Assembly
- Type: Unicameral
- Meeting place: People's Assembly building, Damascus, Syria
- Presiding officer: Speaker; Abdul Hamid al-Awak

Executive branch
- Head of state and government
- Title: President
- Currently: Ahmed al-Sharaa
- Cabinet
- Current cabinet: Syrian transitional government
- Leader: President
- Deputy leader: Vice President
- Appointer: President
- Headquarters: People's Palace
- Ministries: 23

Judicial branch
- Name: Judiciary of Syria
- Supreme Judicial Council
- Chief judge: Independent
- Supreme Constitutional Court
- Chief judge: Issam al-Khalif (President)

After the fall of the Assad regime in December 2024, politics in Syria functions within the framework of a unitary presidential republic governed by a transitional government under the Constitutional Declaration. The President of Syria serves as both the head of state and the head of government. Under the Constitutional Declaration, the powers of the three branches of government are distributed during the provisional period as follows: legislative power is vested in the People's Assembly; executive power is exercised by the government under the leadership of the president; and judicial power is vested in the judiciary, which is independent, with judges subject only to the law.

Since the Syrian Revolution Victory Conference banned the Ba'athist-era National Progressive Front, no new legislation regulating political parties has been enacted, and major political parties have yet to emerge in Syria.

== History ==
During French Syria, the National Bloc emerged as a major group opposing French rule and supporting Syrian nationalism. During the formation of the 1928 Constituent Assembly of Syria to draft a constitution, the National Bloc had a majority had insisted on several elements that French authorities refused. Afterwards, the 1930 Syrian constitution was ratified without their involvement, which established the First Syrian Republic under the French mandate. French rule continued until the British pressured for a French withdrawal during the Levant Crisis, which they eventually did in 1946.

Following Syrian independence, the political sphere was dominated by two main successors of the National Bloc: the National Party and the People's Party. There were also several coups in Syria in the early years of independence, leading to political instability. In 1958, a Syrian referendum to join the United Arab Republic passed with overwhelming majority, and Syria became part of the UAR until the 1961 Syrian coup d'état restored an independent Syria.

In 1963, Ba'athist Syria was established following the 1963 Syrian coup d'état, which brought the Syrian Ba'ath Party to power. From 1963 until April 2011, Syria's Emergency Law suspended most constitutional protections justified on the grounds of the continuing war with Israel and the threats posed by terrorists. This ended when president Bashar al-Assad signed a decree repealing this law amidst widespread discontent in the Syrian revolution and Syrian civil war.

From 1972 to 2011, only parties in the Ba'athist National Progressive Front were legally permitted to operate in Syria. This restriction ended in 2011 with new legislative decrees regulating political parties and general elections, along with ratification of the new 2012 Syrian Constitution, which introduced a multi-party system in Syria. At the same time, the government also disbanded non-Ba'athist militias and sidelined satellite parties of the National Progressive Front by increasing Ba'athist representation in the legislature.

On 8 December 2024, the Ba'athist political system ended with the fall of the Assad regime. Then on 29 January 2025, the Syrian Revolution Victory Conference officially banned parties that were part of the Ba'athist-era National Progressive Front. On 5 October 2025, the 2025 Syrian parliamentary election was held as an indirect election to compose a new legislature.

== Political parties ==
Since the Syrian Revolution Victory Conference banned the Ba'athist-era National Progressive Front, there has not yet been a new law to regulate political parties in the country, and major political parties have not yet emerged. There have been discussions among political figures in forming a new "Syrian National Bloc" to counteract the "centralized authoritarianism" of the Syrian transitional government.

== Public opinion ==
In September 2025, a poll on Syrian public opinion regarding the political future of Syria widely demonstrated support for democratic principles with competitive elections as the basis of governance.
