= Flag of Ba'athist Syria =

National flag of Syria (1963–2024)

Syria

During the rule of the Syrian regional branch of the Arab Socialist Ba'ath Party from 1963 to 2024, and later under the Assad family from 1970 until the regime's collapse in 2024, Ba'athist Syria used different national flags of Syria, all featuring a red, white, and black triband bearing either two or three green stars or the national coat of arms.

Following the 1963 Ba'athist coup d'état, the Revolutionary Command Council adopted a new flag, a red–white–black horizontal triband with three green stars. The three stars represented Egypt, Syria, and Iraq, while also symbolizing the Ba'athist principles of Waḥda, Ḥurriyya, Ishtirākiyya ("unity, freedom, and socialism"). In 1972, after Syria joined Egypt and Libya in the Federation of Arab Republics, the three green stars were replaced by the Hawk of Quraish. Upon the dissolution of the federation, Syria restored the two-star red–white–black tricolour in 1980 by readopting the former flag of the United Arab Republic to symbolize its continued commitment to Arab unity. The flag had been used until 1961, when Syria was part of the United Arab Republic. During the Syrian civil war, the two-star flag became closely associated with the Ba'ath Party and the government of Bashar al-Assad.

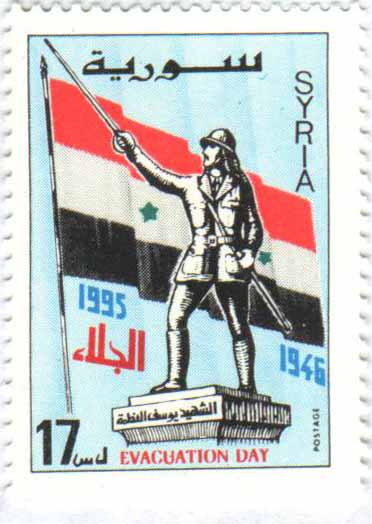
The 1995 Syrian stamp commemorating the Independence Day of Syria depicts the statue of the Syrian revolutionary Yusuf al-Azma alongside the flag of Ba'athist Syria.

After the establishment of the Syrian caretaker government, it was replaced by the green–white–black tricolour with three red stars, which became the new national flag of Syria. The green–white–black tricolour with three red stars had previously been used as the flag of the Syrian opposition during the Syrian revolution and the subsequent Syrian civil war. Following the fall of the Assad regime in 2024, the two-star flag ceased to be the national flag of Syria, but it continues to be used by pro-Assad loyalists in parts of western Syria.

== Design ==
=== Color scheme ===
Color scheme	Green	White	Black	Red	Gold
RGB	0–122–61	255–255–255	0–0–0	206–17–38	239–187–34
Hexadecimal	#007A3D	#FFFFFF	#000000	#CE1126	#EFBB22
CMYK	89, 27, 100, 15	0, 0, 0, 0	75, 68, 67, 90	12, 100, 98, 3	7, 26, 99, 0
Pantone	—	White	Black	186 C	7409 C
Valid for					

== History ==
=== 1963–1972 ===
Flag of Ba'athist Syria (1963–1972)

Following the 1963 Ba'athist coup d'état and the agreement over the formation of a United Arab Republic between Egypt, Syria, and Iraq, the Revolutionary Command Council adopted a new flag, a red–white–black horizontal triband with three green stars, on 1 May 1963, which remained in use until 1 January 1972. In February 1963, the Ba'athist regime also came to power in Iraq, and the two Ba'athist governments began negotiations in Cairo to once again form a union. The process failed after the Iraqi Ba'athist government was overthrown in November 1963, but both Syria and Iraq adopted a new flag intended to represent the proposed union. This flag differed only slightly from the flag of the UAR, with the two stars replaced by three to represent the addition of Iraq to the proposed federation. The three stars represented the unity of Egypt, Syria, and Iraq, as well as the three pillars of Ba'athism: Waḥda, Ḥurriyya, Ishtirākiyya ("unity, freedom, and socialism").

=== 1972–1980 ===
Flag of Ba'athist Syria in the Federation of Arab Republics (1972–1980)

President Hafez al-Assad adopted a new flag on 1 January 1972, as Syria joined Egypt and Libya in the Federation of Arab Republics. The green stars were replaced by the Hawk of Quraish (the symbol of the tribe of Muhammad). The eagle bore a ribbon bearing the name of the federation, but unlike Egypt and Libya, Syria did not include its name on the coat of arms. This flag served as the official national flag during the Yom Kippur War in 1973. Although the federation was dissolved in 1977, Syria continued to use the flag until 29 March 1980.

On 30 March 1980, it was replaced by the two-star flag to symbolize Syria's continued commitment to Arab unity.

=== 1980–2024 ===
Flag of Ba'athist Syria (1980–2024)

The national flag of Ba'athist Syria used between 1980 and 2024 was first adopted in 1958 when Syria was part of the United Arab Republic, and remained in use until 1961. Since its first adoption, variations of the red–white–black flag were used in various Arab unions involving Syria with Egypt, Libya, Sudan, Yemen, and Iraq. Although Syria was not part of any Arab state union after 1961, the flag of the United Arab Republic was readopted to demonstrate Syria's commitment to Arab unity. The flag's use became disputed because it was often associated with the Ba'ath Party and came to represent parties loyal to Bashar al-Assad's government during the Syrian civil war.

For times, the Ba'ath Party's flag was even more used than Syrian flag.

The Ba'athist Syrian flag was described in Article 6 of the 2012 Constitution of Syria. The first paragraph of the article stated:

The flag of the Syrian Arab Republic consists of four colours: red, white and black, with two green stars, of five angles each. The flag is rectangular, with its width measuring two-thirds of its length. It is divided into three rectangles of identical dimensions and have the same length as the flag. The upper one is red, the middle being white and the bottom one is black, with the two green stars in the middle of the white rectangle.

— 1st Paragraph of Article 6 of the Syrian Constitution

== Legal status and use post-Assad ==
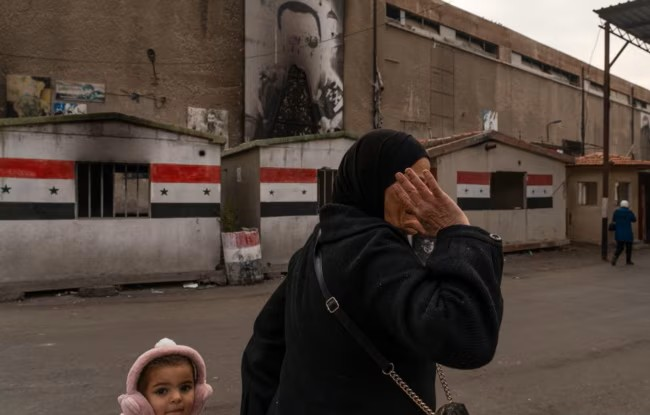
A destroyed image of Bashar al-Assad and the flag of Ba'athist Syria in Damascus following the fall of the Assad regime

Following the fall of the Assad regime in 2024, the two-star red–white–black tricolour, which Syria had restored on 30 March 1980 by readopting the former flag of the United Arab Republic, ceased to be the national flag. Following the establishment of the Syrian caretaker government, it was replaced by the green–white–black tricolour with three red stars, which became the new national flag of Syria. The United Nations also updated its list of member states to display Syria's new national flag.

Other platforms, such as Microsoft Windows, still display the two-star red–white–black tricolour of Ba'athist Syria as the emoji for the Syrian Arab Republic. Meanwhile, loyalists of the deposed Assad regime continued to use the two-star red–white–black tricolour in parts of western Syria.

== Derived flags ==
=== Armed forces flags ===
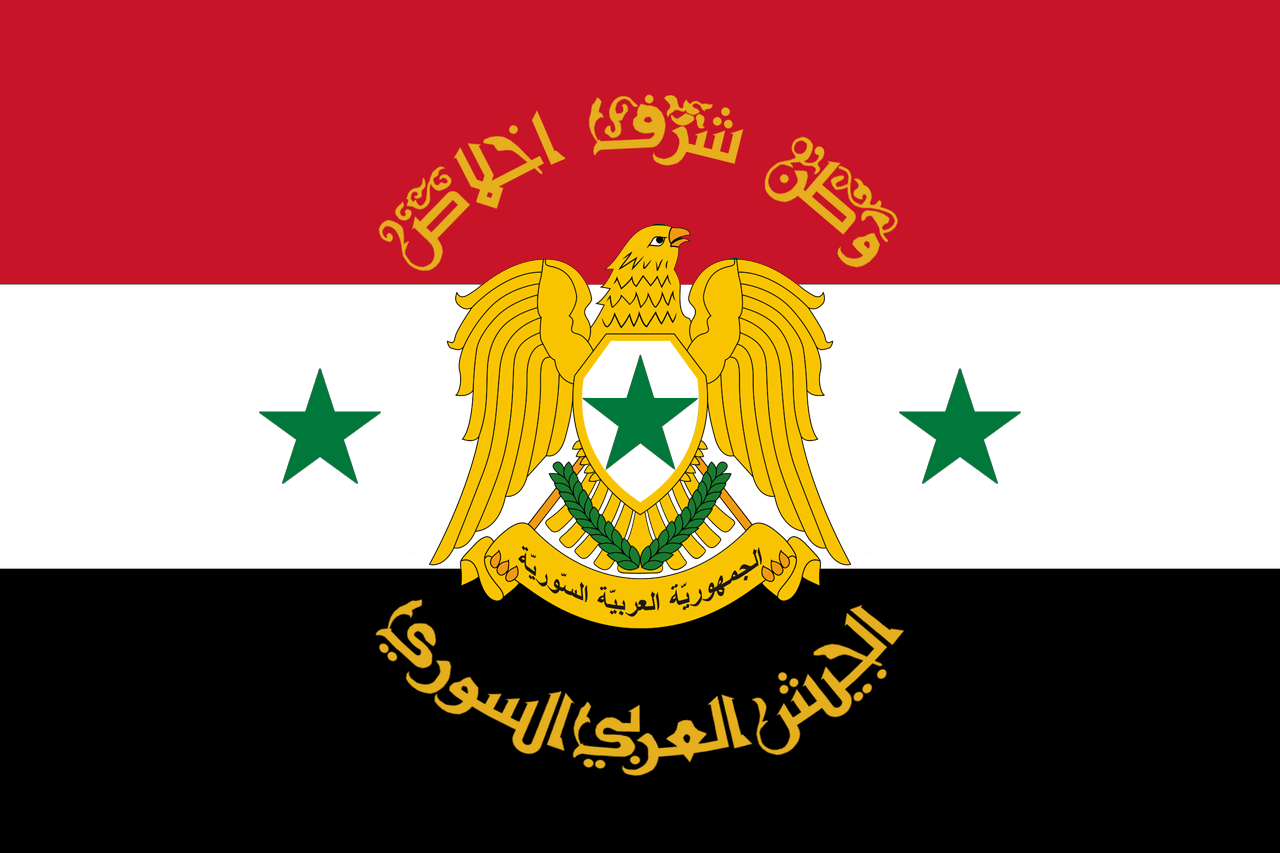
Flag of the Syrian Arab Armed Forces (1963–1972)

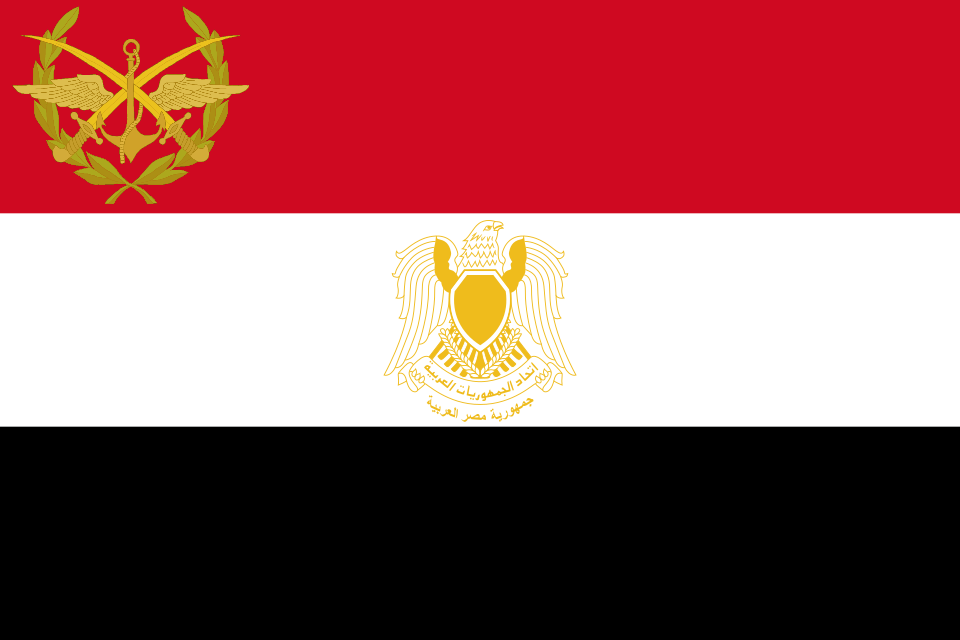
Flag of the Syrian Arab Armed Forces (1972–1980)

Flag of the Syrian Arab Armed Forces (1980–2024)

=== Other derived flags ===
Presidential standard of Syria (1963–1972)

Presidential standard of Syria (1972–1980)

Unofficial presidential standard of Syria (1980–2024)

Flag of the Minister of Defence of Syria (1980–2024)

== Gallery ==
=== Historical usage ===
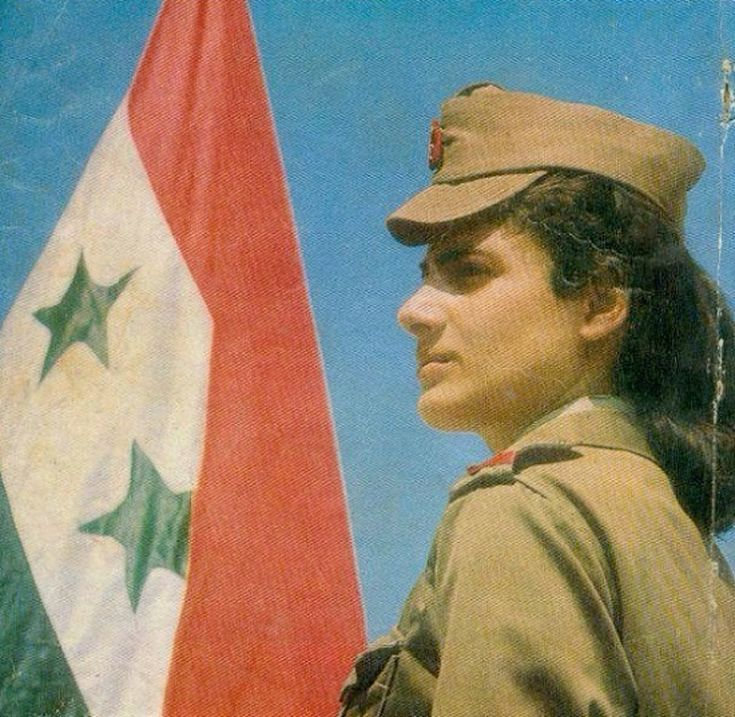
A Syrian woman in military uniform serving in the Syrian Army, alongside the Ba'athist Syrian flag, a red–white–black tricolour bearing three green stars at the time, 1969.

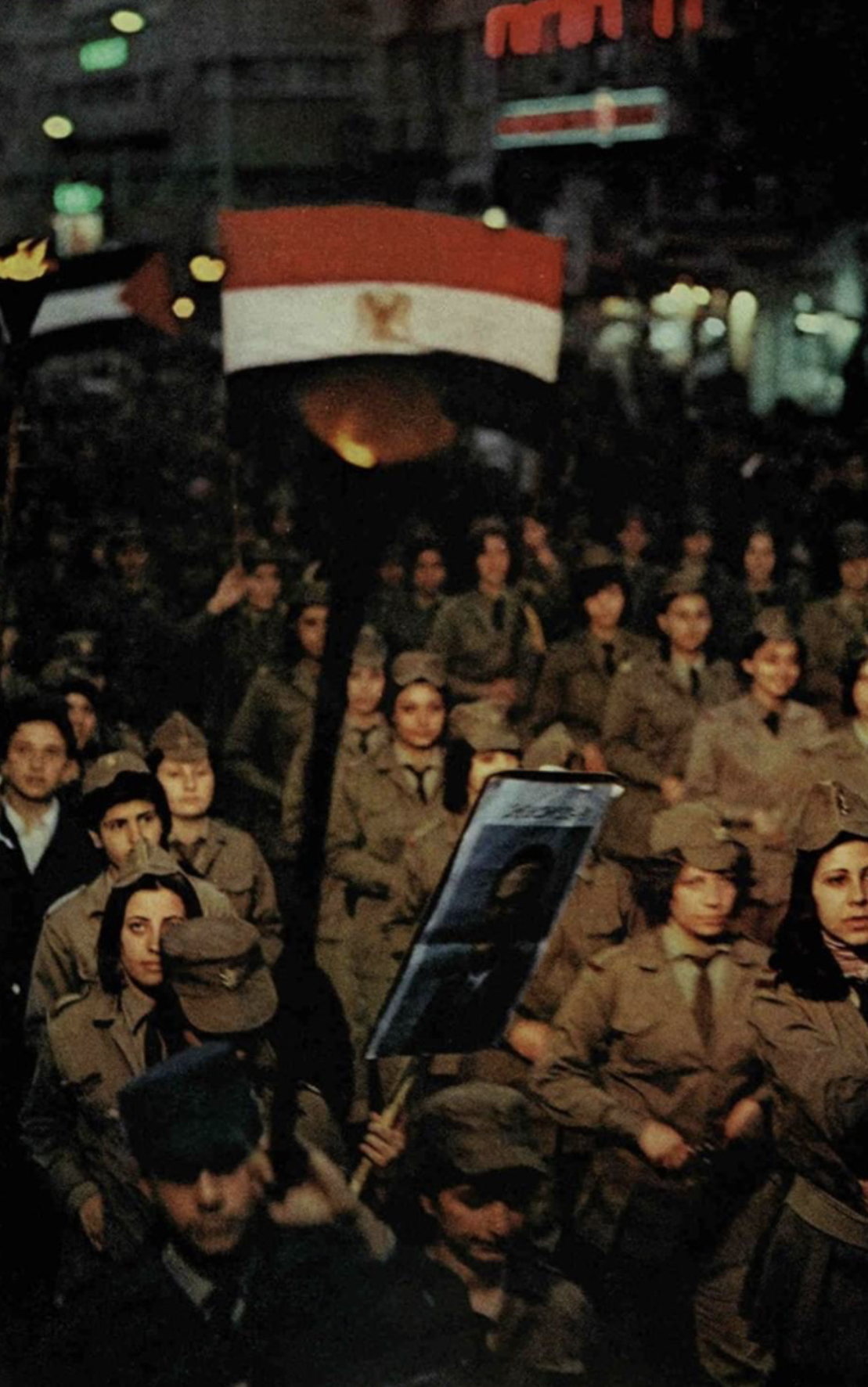
The flag of the Federation of Arab Republics, adopted by Syria as its national flag, displayed during nationalist demonstrations and military marches involving Syrian citizens in military uniform in Damascus, 1974.

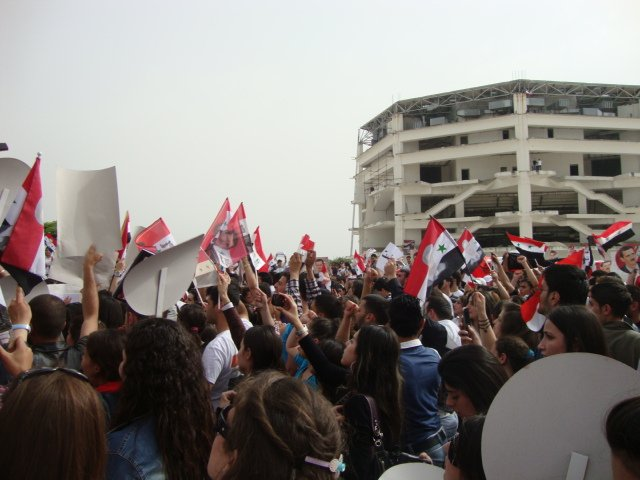
A pro-Assad student rally at Tishreen University (now Latakia University) waving the Ba'athist Syrian flag, a red–white–black tricolour with two green stars, 2011.

=== Two-star flags ===
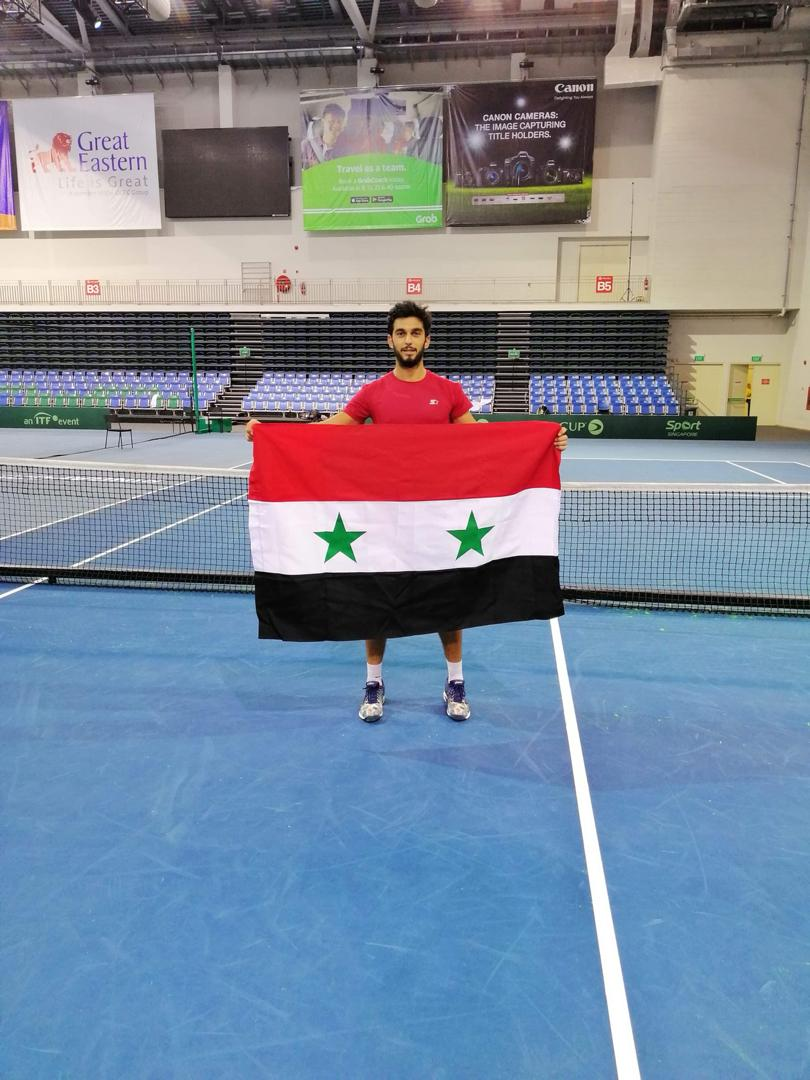
Syrian tennis player Yacoub Makzoume holding the Ba'athist Syrian flag.

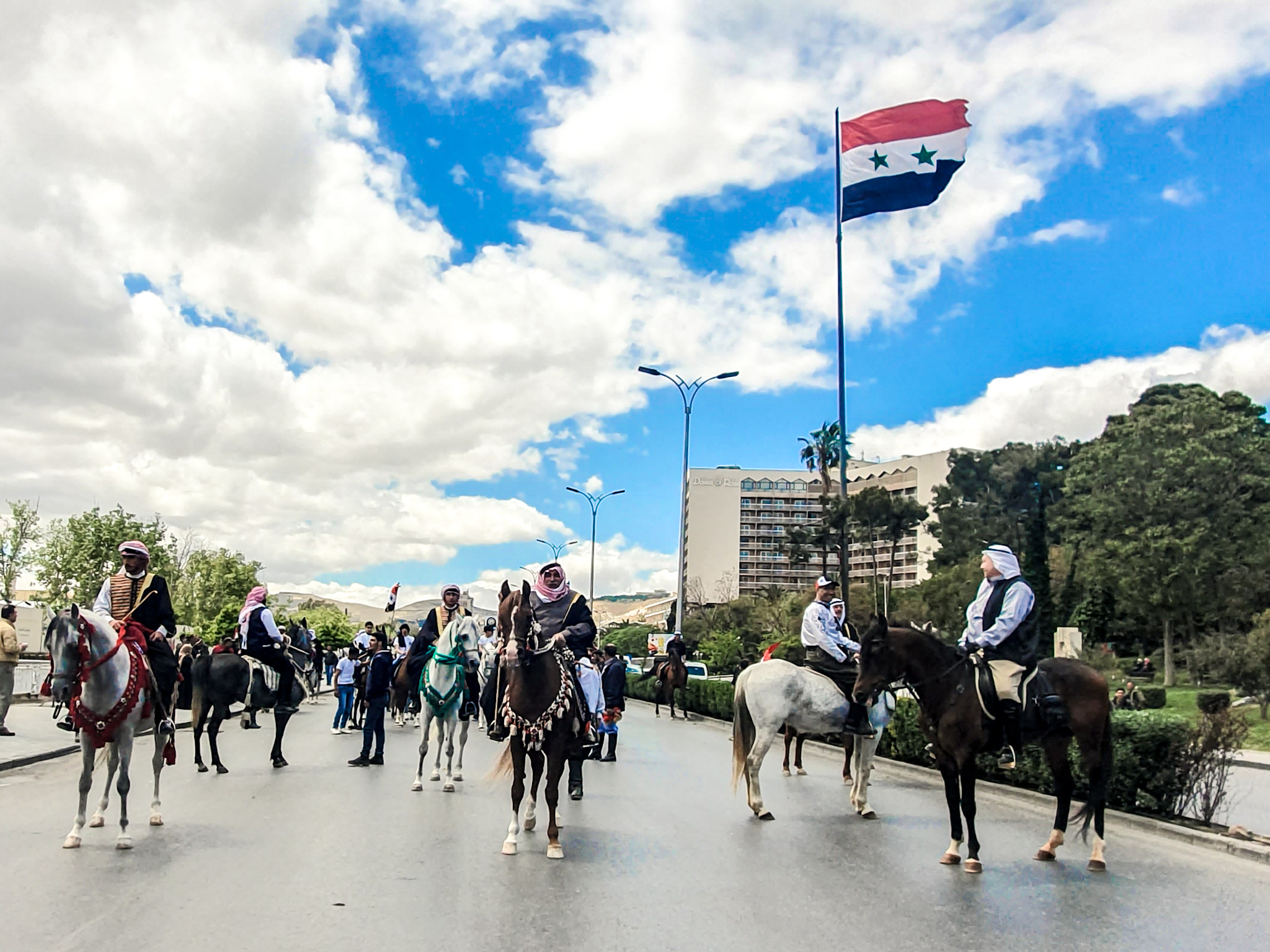
The Ba'athist Syrian flag flying in Damascus.

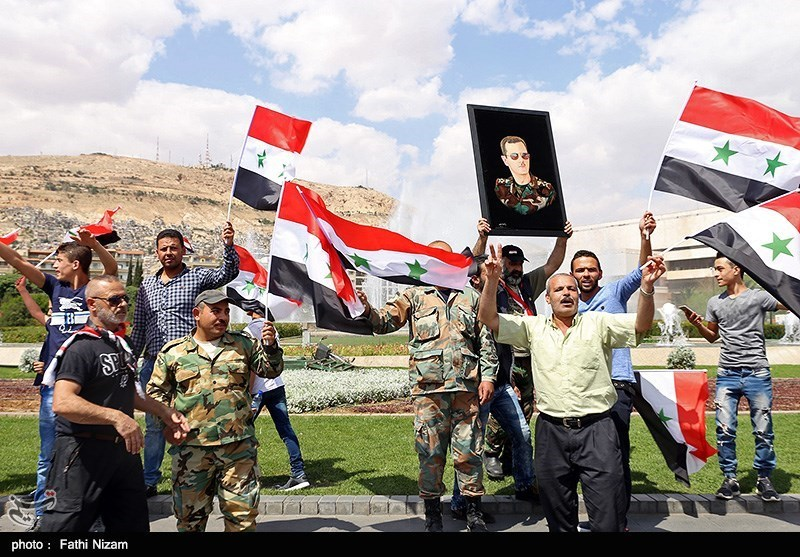
Pro-government Syrians demonstrate and wave the flag of Ba'athist Syria while holding portraits of Bashar al-Assad in Damascus following the 2018 missile strikes against Syria.

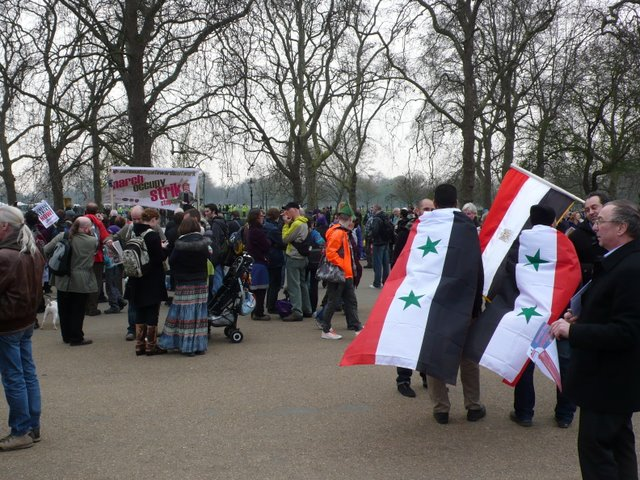
Two men with the Ba'athist Syrian flag.

== See also ==
- Flag of Syria
- Arab Liberation Flag
- National symbols of Syria
- List of Syrian flags
- Pan-Arab colors
