= Government of Syria =

National government

Government of the Syrian Arab Republic
- Emblem of Syria
- Formation: 8 December 2024; 21 months ago
- Founding document: Constitutional Declaration
- Jurisdiction: Syria

Legislative branch
- Legislature: People's Assembly
- Meeting place: People's Assembly building, Damascus, Syria

Executive branch
- Leader: President
- Headquarters: People's Palace
- Main organ: Syrian transitional government
- Departments: 23

Judicial branch
- Court: Supreme Judicial Council; Supreme Constitutional Court

The government of Syria is under a unitary presidential system and, as of 2026, is in a provisional period governed by a transitional government. The current President of Syria is Ahmed al-Sharaa, who serves as both the head of state and head of government. The central government is based in Damascus.

The powers of the three branches are vested by the Constitutional Declaration during the provisional period as follows: legislative power is vested in the People’s Assembly, executive power is exercised by the government under the leadership of the president, and judicial power is vested in the judiciary, which is independent, while judges are subject only to the law.

== History ==
In 1922, French authorities created the Syrian Federation under the Mandate for Syria and Lebanon, and Subhi Barakat was its president. The federation system did not last, and was replaced as the State of Syria by 1925. Barakat briefly retained the role of president until the beginning of the Great Syrian Revolt that year caused him to resign. During French Syria, the National Bloc emerged as a major group opposing French rule and supporting Syrian nationalism. During the formation of the 1928 Constituent Assembly of Syria to draft a constitution, the National Bloc had a majority had insisted on several elements that French authorities refused. Afterwards, the 1930 Syrian constitution was ratified without their involvement, which established the First Syrian Republic under the French mandate. French rule continued until the British pressured for a French withdrawal during the Levant Crisis, which they eventually did in 1946.

=== Post-independence ===
Following Syrian independence, the political sphere was dominated by two main successors of the National Bloc: the National Party and the People's Party. There were also several coups in Syria in the early years of independence, leading to political instability. In 1958, a Syrian referendum to join the United Arab Republic passed with overwhelming majority, and Syria became part of the UAR until the 1961 Syrian coup d'état restored an independent Syria.

=== Ba'athist Syria ===
In 1963, Ba'athist Syria was established following the 1963 Syrian coup d'état, which brought the Syrian Ba'ath Party to power. From 1963 until April 2011, Syria's Emergency Law suspended most constitutional protections justified on the grounds of the continuing war with Israel and the threats posed by terrorists. This ended when president Bashar al-Assad signed a decree repealing this law amidst widespread discontent in the Syrian revolution and Syrian civil war. From 1972 to 2011, only parties in the Ba'athist National Progressive Front were legally permitted to operate in Syria. This restriction ended in 2011 with new legislative decrees regulating political parties and general elections, along with ratification of the new 2012 Syrian Constitution, which introduced a multi-party system in Syria. At the same time, the government also disbanded non-Ba'athist militias and sidelined satellite parties of the National Progressive Front by increasing Ba'athist representation in the legislature.

=== Fall of the Assad regime ===
The 2024 Syrian opposition offensives, codenamed "Deterrence of Aggression," were led by Hay'at Tahrir al-Sham (HTS) and supported by allied Turkish-backed groups in the Syrian National Army. These offensives resulted in the rapid fall of Bashar al-Assad's government, ending five decades of Assad family rule that began when Hafez al-Assad assumed power in 1971 under the Ba'ath Party following a coup d'état. As a rebel coalition moved closer to Damascus, reports indicated that Bashar al-Assad had fled the capital by plane to Russia, where he joined his exiled family and was granted political asylum by the Russian government. After his departure, opposition forces announced their victory on state television. At the same time, Russia's Ministry of Foreign Affairs confirmed his resignation and departure from Syria.

== Political transition ==
Ahmed al-Sharaa, leader of the Syrian Salvation Government, stated on Telegram that Syrian public institutions would not immediately be taken over by force and would instead temporarily be held by the Syrian prime minister, Mohammad Ghazi al-Jalali, until the full political transition was completed. Al-Jalali announced in a social media video that he planned to stay in Damascus and cooperate with the Syrian people while expressing hope that Syria could become "a normal country" and begin to engage in diplomacy with other nations. Jalali also expressed his readiness to "extend its hand" to the opposition.

=== Syrian caretaker government (2024–2025) ===
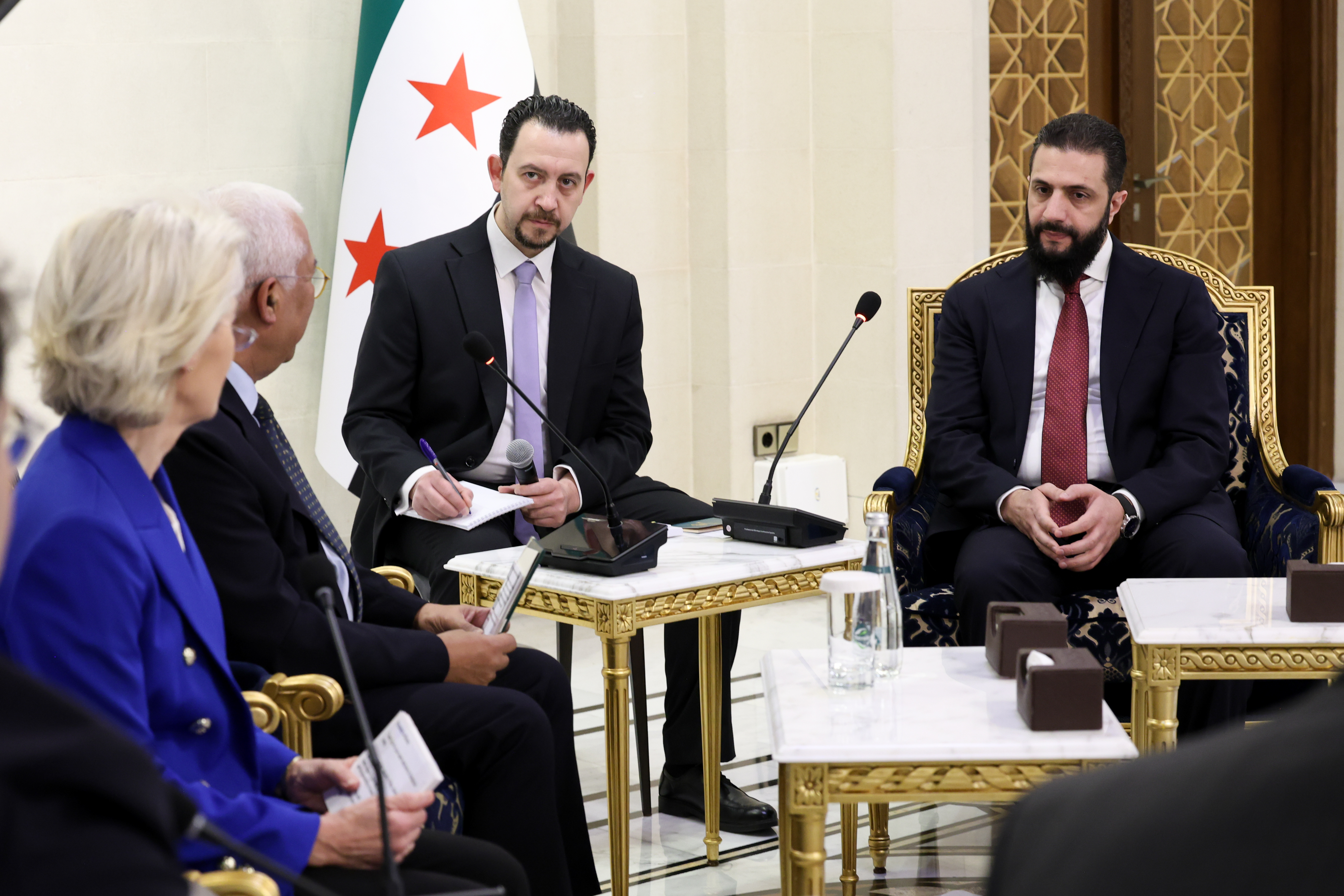
Ahmed al-Sharaa with European Commission President Ursula von der Leyen and European Council President António Costa, 9 January 2026

Al-Sharaa became the country's de facto leader as head of Hay'at Tahrir al-Sham (HTS) and the new Syrian administration, and on 9 December, HTS released a video showing al-Jalali and Mohammed al-Bashir, the Prime Minister of the Syrian Salvation Government; following the fall of the Assad government, al-Bashir was tasked with forming a transitional government after meeting with al-Sharaa and al-Jalali to coordinate the transfer of power, and was officially appointed the next day by the General Command of Syria as prime minister of the caretaker government. In a televised statement, al-Bashir announced that officials from the Salvation Government met with representatives of the previous government to facilitate the handover of power and that his cabinet from the Salvation Government would assume their corresponding roles in the transitional government. On 29 January 2025, during the Syrian Revolution Victory Conference in Damascus, the Syrian General Command appointed al-Sharaa as president for the transitional period after he had served as the de facto leader following the fall of the Assad regime. As president, al-Sharaa announced plans to issue a "constitutional declaration" as a legal reference following the repeal of the 2012 constitution of Ba'athist Syria.

=== Syrian transitional government (2025–present) ===
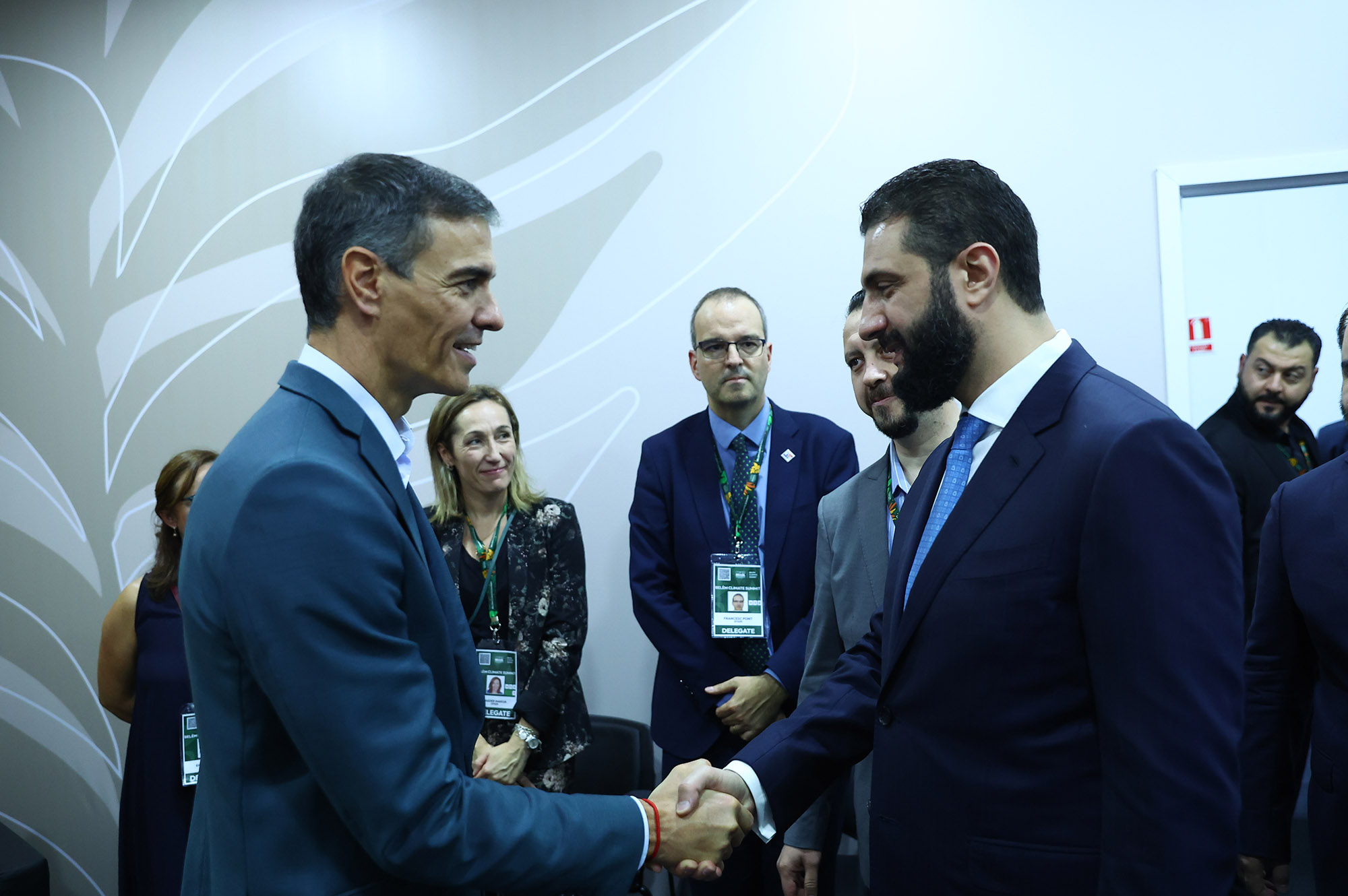
Spanish Prime Minister Pedro Sánchez and Syrian President al-Sharaa during the COP30 summit in Brazil, 7 November 2025

On 13 March, al-Sharaa signed a Constitutional Declaration for a transitional period of five years, enshrining Islamic law as a main derivation of jurisprudence and promising to protect the rights of all Syria's ethnic and religious groups. The Constitutional Declaration sets a presidential system with the executive power at the hands of the president who appoints the ministers, without the position of prime minister. On 29 March, the Syrian transitional government was announced by al-Sharaa at a ceremony at the Presidential Palace in Damascus, in which the new ministers were sworn in and delivered speeches outlining their agendas. The government replaced the Syrian caretaker government, which was formed following the fall of the Assad regime. The post of prime minister was abolished. On 9 May 2026, as part of a partial government reshuffle, al-Sharaa appointed Khaled Fawaz Zaarour and Basel al-Suweydan as the Ministers of Information and Agriculture, replacing Hamza al-Mustafa and Amjad Badr, respectively. The reshuffle was the first since the ouster of former President Bashar al-Assad. Al-Sharaa also retained Asaad al-Shaibani as Minister of Foreign Affairs and Expatriates and Murhaf Abu Qasra as Minister of Defense.

== Executive branch ==
=== President ===
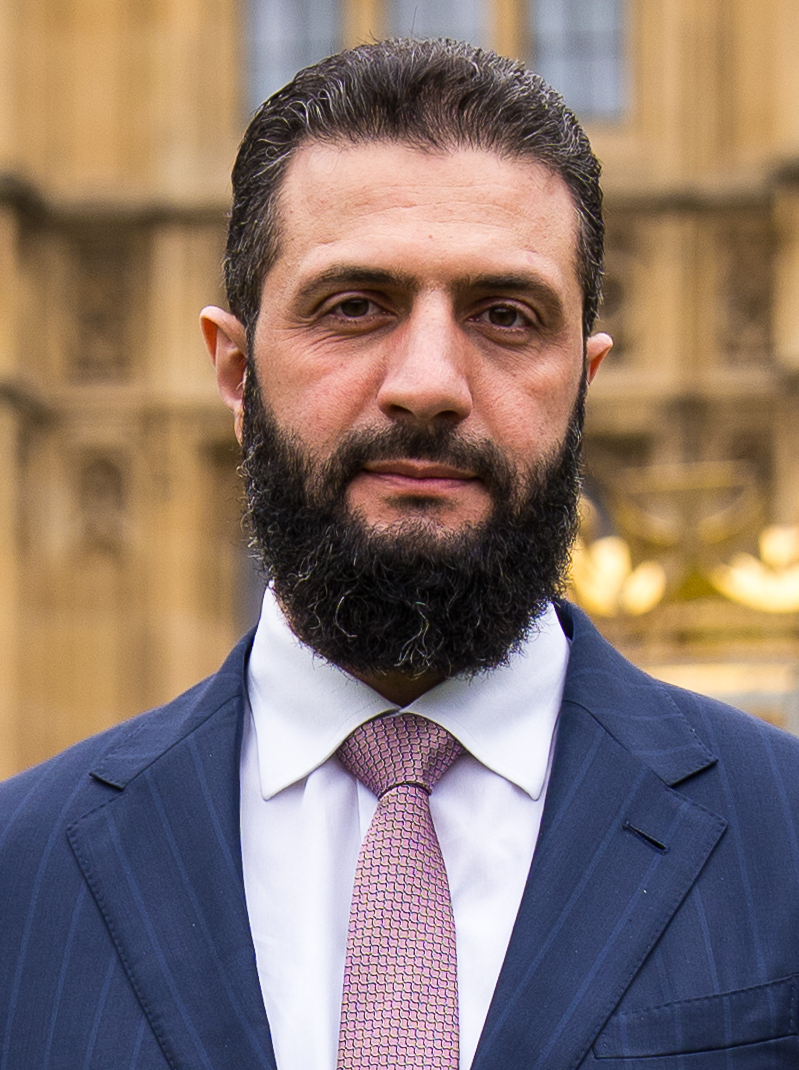
Ahmed al-Sharaa President of Syria since 29 January 2025

The Constitutional Declaration establishes a presidential system where the president holds executive power and appoints ministers, without a prime minister. According to the Constitutional Declaration, the President of Syria serves as the commander-in-chief of the army and armed forces. According to Article 39, the President of the Republic promulgates laws approved by the People’s Assembly. He has the right to object to such laws through a reasoned decision within one month from the date of their receipt from the Assembly. A law that has been objected to shall not be approved unless it is passed again by a two-thirds majority of the People’s Assembly, in which case the President must issue it by decree. Under Article 36, the President of the Republic issues executive and regulatory regulations, control regulations, and presidential orders and decisions in accordance with the laws. Article 3 of the Constitutional Declaration states, "The religion of the President of the Republic is Islam; Islamic jurisprudence is the principal source of legislation. Currently, Syria operates under a unitary system, with the president serving as both head of state and head of government.

=== Vice President ===
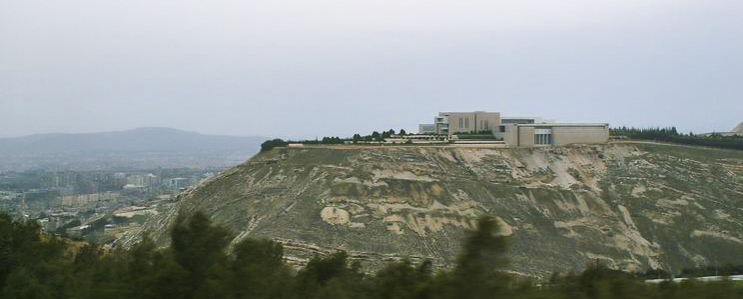
The People's Palace is the official residence of the president

Under the Constitutional Declaration of the Syrian Arab Republic, the President of the Republic appoints one or more vice presidents, determines their powers, dismisses them, and accepts their resignations, while the vice president assumes the President’s powers if the presidency becomes vacant. Since the fall of the Assad regime, the position has been left vacant.

== Legislative branch ==
=== People's Assembly ===
People's Assembly Building in Damascus, Syria, the seat of the Assembly.

Following the adoption of the Constitutional Declaration, a provisional parliament called the "People's Assembly" was established to serve as the interim parliament during the five-year transition, overseeing the drafting of a new permanent constitution. The president selects one-third of the People's Assembly members, with the remaining two-thirds being elected through commissions supervised by a committee designated by the president. A presidential decree issued on 2 June 2025 established the Higher Committee for People's Assembly Elections. The 11-member committee is responsible for overseeing the formation of electoral sub-committees, which will elect two-thirds of the members of the People's Assembly.

On 5 October, the 2025 Syrian parliamentary election was held in the temporary electoral system as an indirect vote, where only around 6,000 selected Syrians were eligible. 140 members were due to be elected by the electoral college, although only 119 were elected on election day due to postponement in select areas from security concerns. President Ahmed al-Sharaa is set to appoint the remaining 70 additional members.

The People's Assembly building underwent renovations beginning in November 2025. Officials said that the delay in convening the Parliament was due to the need to complete the postponed elections, which began in February 2026. Al-Sharaa said that the first session of the People's Assembly had been delayed as the state preferred to wait until all the elections were completed. While in at a meeting in the Royal Institute of International Affairs, Al-Sharaa announced that the People's Assembly will be seated within the month.

On 30 June 2026, it was officially confirmed that the list of 70 appointees selected by al-Sharaa was released on 1 July. The appointees were selected by a committee that completed a series of meetings and closed interviews between 15 and 21 June, during which it interviewed 100 candidates. The People’s Assembly held its inaugural session on 12 July 2026, after being delayed from 6 July. It was the first legislative session since the fall of the Assad regime. During the session, members elected Abdul Hamid al-Awak as Speaker by secret ballot, making him the first person to hold the position since the regime's fall.

== Judicial branch ==
Syria's judicial branches includes the Supreme Constitutional Court, the Supreme Judicial Council, the Court of Cassation, and the State Security Courts. Islamic jurisprudence is a main source of legislation and Syria's judicial system had elements of Ottoman, French, and Islamic laws. Syria had three levels of courts: courts of first instance, courts of appeals, and the constitutional court, the highest tribunal. Religious courts handle questions of personal and family law.

On 7 July 2026, al-Sharaa issued a decree appointing Issam al-Khalif as president of the Supreme Constitutional Court, along with six other members. On 19 July, the court held its inaugural meeting to begin drafting legislation governing its functions and defining its jurisdiction.

== International organization participation ==
Syria is a member of the

- Arab Bank for Economic Development in Africa
- Arab Fund for Economic and Social Development
- Arab Monetary Fund
- Council of Arab Economic Unity
- Customs Cooperation Council
- Economic and Social Commission for Western Asia
- Food and Agriculture Organization
- Group of 24
- Group of 77
- International Atomic Energy Agency
- International Bank for Reconstruction and Development
- International Civil Aviation Organization
- International Chamber of Commerce
- International Development Association
- Islamic Development Bank
- International Fund for Agricultural Development
- International Finance Corporation
- International Labour Organization
- International Monetary Fund
- International Maritime Organization
- Intelsat
- Interpol
- International Olympic Committee
- International Organization for Standardization
- International Telecommunication Union
- International Federation of Red Cross and Red Crescent Societies
- Non-Aligned Movement
- Organization of Arab Petroleum Exporting Countries
- Organisation of Islamic Cooperation
- United Nations
- UN Commission on Human Rights
- UN Conference on Trade and Development
- UN Industrial Development Organization
- UN Relief and Works Agency for Palestine Refugees in the Near East
- Universal Postal Union
- World Federation of Trade Unions
- World Health Organization
- World Meteorological Organization
- World Tourism Organization

Syria's diplomats last sat on the UN Security Council (as a non-permanent member) in December 2003.

Previous: Government of Ba'athist Syria; 1963–2024	Government of Syria; 2024–present	Next: —
