= Hassan Abdul Ghani =

Syrian general

Brigadier General Hassan Abdul Ghani
- حسن عبد الغني

Spokesperson for the Ministry of Defense
- President: Ahmed al-Sharaa
- Minister: Murhaf Abu Qasra

Spokesman of the Military Operations Command
- Succeeded by: Position abolished

Personal details
- Born: Khafsin, Hama, Syria

Military service
- Allegiance: Syria (since 2024); Formerly: Ba'athist Syria (until 2011); Liwa al-Haqq; Al-Nusra Front (until 2016); Jabhat Fateh al-Sham (2016–2017); Hay'at Tahrir al-Sham (2017–2025)
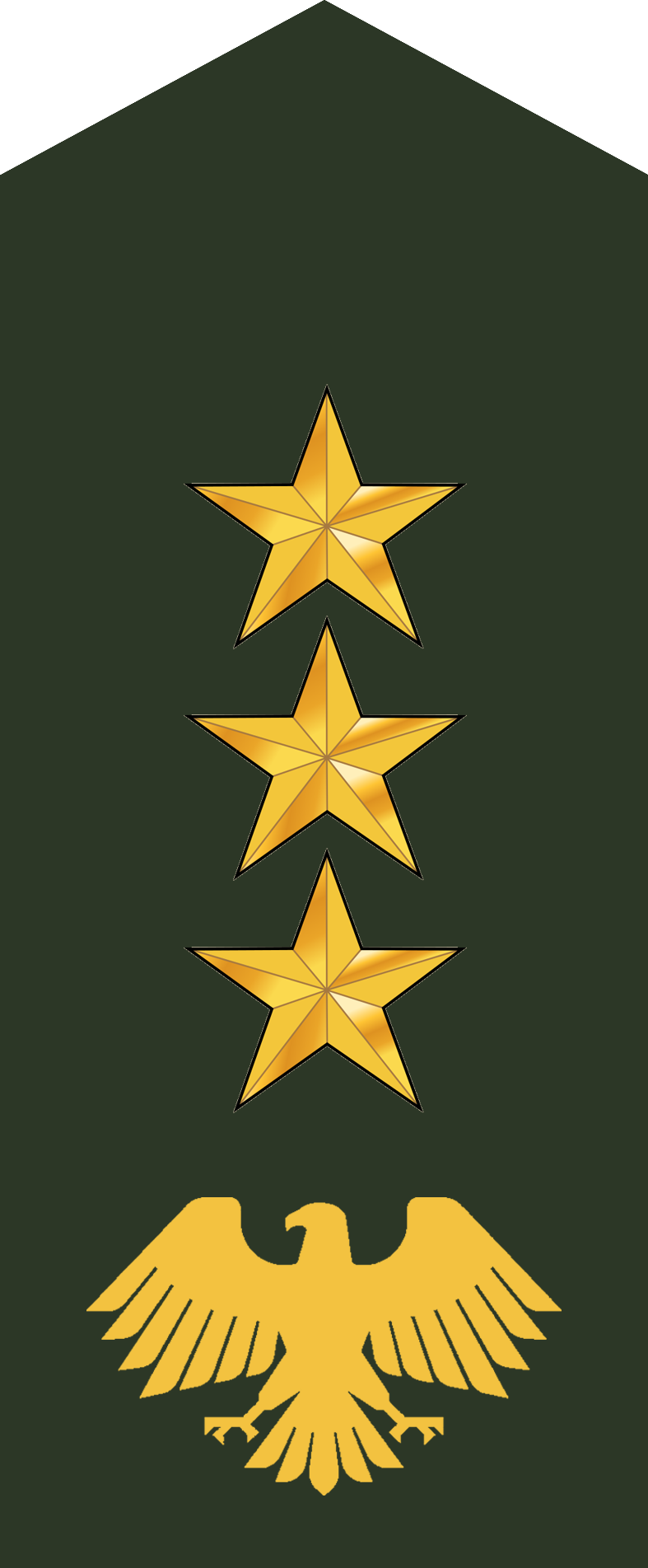
- Rank: Brigadier General
- Battles/wars: Syrian civil war; 2024 Syrian opposition offensives

Hassan Mohammed Abdul Ghani (Arabic: حسن محمد عبد الغني) is a Syrian military officer and former spokesman for the Military Operations Command. He became known for his public statements during the 2024 Syrian opposition offensives against the Assad regime.

== Early life and education ==
He was born in the village of Khafsin in Suran Subdistrict, Hama Governorate. He studied at the Higher Institute of Railways, affiliated with the Ministry of Transport, and also studied digital marketing at the Faculty of Economics at Homs University.

== Role during the Syrian civil war ==
He participated in peaceful demonstrations upon the outbreak of the Syrian revolution in 2011, and later defected from the Syrian Arab Army as a lieutenant colonel. He joined the Free Syrian Army in Hama, and helped participate in manufacturing and detonating mines against Syrian government forces.

In 2013, he was arrested by the Assad regime in his hometown and was transferred between Military Intelligence Directorate Branch 248 and Adra Prison before being released after six months.

After being released, he joined Liwa al-Haqq before later joining the Al-Nusra Front, then joining Jabhat Fateh al-Sham upon its formation in 2016 and becoming a leader in Hay'at Tahrir al-Sham upon its establishment in 2017.

He participated in the 2024 Syrian opposition offensives, which resulted in the fall of the Assad regime on 8 December 2024, during which he served as the official spokesman for the Military Operations Command, in which he delivered the first statement announcing "the start of a military operation to deter the enemy, defeat its assembled forces, and keep its fire away from our people."

== Post-Assad era ==
On 29 December 2024, he was promoted to colonel by Syria's caretaker government alongside other opposition figures.

On 29 January 2025, Abdul Ghani attended the Syrian Revolution Victory Conference, announcing the appointment of Ahmed al-Sharaa as president of Syria and the dissolution of the former People's Assembly, 2012 constitution, army and security agencies, and the Ba'ath Party.
