= Yahya Diab =

Syrian diplomat and human rights lawyer

- يحيى دياب

Permanent Representative of Syria to the Arab League
- Incumbent
- Assumed office 1 August 2026
- President: Ahmed al-Sharaa
- Preceded by: Hossam Eddin Ala

Chargé d’Affaires of the Syrian Embassy to Cairo, Egypt
- Incumbent
- Assumed office July 2026
- President: Ahmed al-Sharaa

Personal details
- Education: Damascus University (LL.B.)

Yahya Diab (Note: Arabic: يحيى دياب) is a Syrian diplomat, human rights lawyer, and politician who has served as Syria's Permanent Representative to the Arab League and as chargé d'affaires at the Syrian Embassy in Cairo, Egypt, under the al-Sharaa administration since 2026.

Diab comes from Al-Zabadani, northwest of Damascus, and holds a law degree from Damascus University. He served in Syrian diplomatic missions in Rome, Abu Dhabi, Kuwait, and Belgrade before defecting from the Ba'athist Syrian government in 2012. In November 2025, he was reinstated by Syrian Foreign Minister Asaad al-Shaibani as a diplomat in the Ministry of Foreign Affairs and Expatriates as part of a group of diplomats who had defected during the Assad regime.

In July 2026, he submitted his credentials as chargé d'affaires of the Syrian Embassy in Cairo, and on 1 August 2026, he submitted his credentials as Syria's Permanent Representative to the Arab League.

== Biography ==
Diab comes from Al-Zabadani, northwest of Damascus, and holds a law degree from Damascus University. He previously served in several diplomatic missions of the Syrian Arab Republic, including in Rome, Abu Dhabi, Kuwait, and Belgrade, and chaired the trade union committee at the Ministry of Foreign Affairs and Expatriates. Diab defected from the Ba'athist Syrian government in 2012 while serving at the Syrian embassy in Belgrade.

== Career ==
On 3 November 2025, Syrian Foreign Minister Asaad al-Shaibani decided to reinstate Diab as a diplomat in the Ministry of Foreign Affairs and Expatriates, along with a group of diplomats who had defected during the Assad regime.

In 2026, Diab was nominated as Syria's ambassador to Egypt following Egypt's reported rejection of Syria's previous nominee, Mohammed Taha al-Ahmed, due to security concerns over his previous affiliations with Hay'at Tahrir al-Sham. In June 2026, a source at the Foreign Ministry told Asharq Al-Awsat that Egypt had informed Syria of its approval of Diab to head the Syrian diplomatic mission in Cairo.

A Syrian Foreign Ministry source said that Diab would serve as chargé d'affaires of the Syrian Embassy in Egypt and was also likely to become Syria's permanent representative to the Arab League. In July 2026, Diab submitted his credentials to Egyptian Assistant Foreign Minister for Protocol Affairs, Ambassador Ayman el-Desouki, as chargé d'affaires of the Syrian Embassy in Cairo, Egypt. Diab submitted his credentials to Arab League Secretary-General Nabil Fahmy on 1 August 2026 as Syria's Permanent Representative to the Arab League.
