= Hossam Eddin Ala =

Syrian diplomat

- حسام الدين آلا
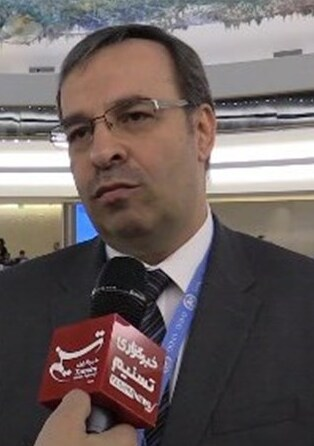
- Ala in 2017

Permanent Representative of Syria to the Arab League
- In office 25 June 2023 – 1 August 2026
- President: Bashar al-Assad; Ahmed al-Sharaa
- Preceded by: Youssef al-Ahmad
- Succeeded by: Yahya Diab

Personal details
- Born: 1958 (age 67–68)

Hossam Eddin Ala (born 1958) is a Syrian diplomat who served as Syria's Permanent Representative to the Arab League from 2023 to 2026. Ala comes from the city of Aleppo, Syria. He worked at the Permanent Mission of the Syrian Arab Republic to the United Nations in New York from 1996 to 2001 and later served as director of the office of the Assistant Foreign Minister in Damascus. He also served as Syria's ambassador to Spain and to the Holy See.

In 2023, Syrian President Bashar al-Assad appointed Ala as Assistant Foreign Minister for European Affairs and International Organizations. Following the lifting of the suspension of Syria's membership in the Arab League, Ala was appointed Syria's Permanent Representative to the Arab League on 1 June 2023 and presented his credentials on 25 June 2023. In August 2026, he was succeeded by Syrian diplomat Yahya Diab

== Career ==
Ala comes from the city of Aleppo, Syria. Ala worked at the Permanent Mission of the Syrian Arab Republic to the United Nations in New York between 1996 and 2001. He was later director of the assistant foreign minister in Damascus. He also served as Syria's ambassador to Spain and as Syria's ambassador to the Holy See.

Responding to allegations from UN human rights chief Zeid Raad Al Hussein calling Aleppo a "slaugherhouse" during Siege of Aleppo in 2016, Ala delivered a "visibly angry" statement, insisting that the Assad regime was waging a battle against terrorism.

=== Permanent Representative of Syria to the Arab League ===
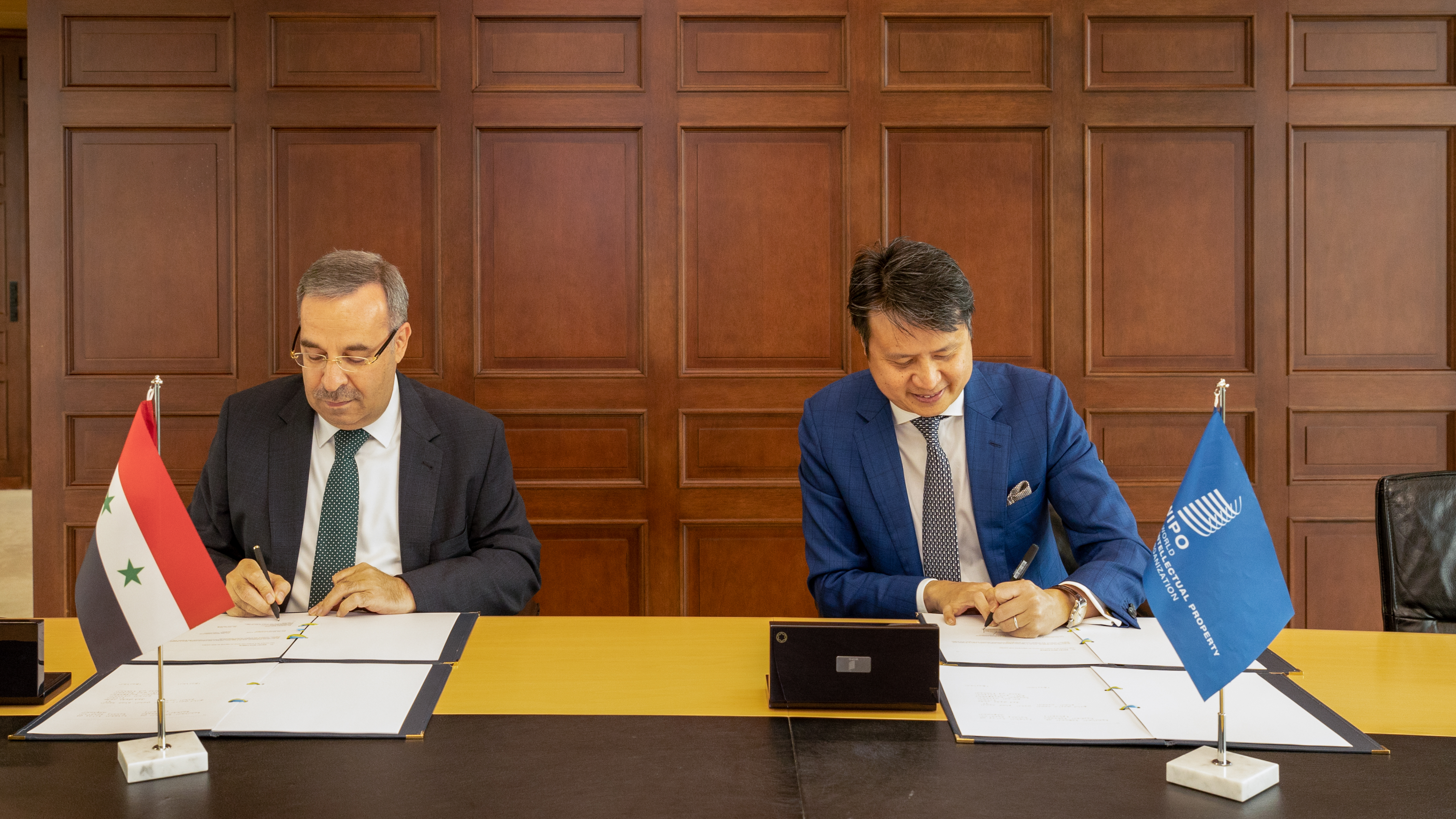
Ala (right) and WIPO Director General Daren Tang (left) signed a Service Level Agreement on 16 September 2021

In 2023, Syrian President Bashar al-Assad appointed Ala as Assistant Foreign Minister for European Affairs and International Organizations. After the suspension of Syria's membership in the Arab League was lifted, Ala was appointed Syria's Permanent Representative on 1 June 2023, presenting his credentials on 25 June 2023.

In March 2025, Ala took part in a meeting with Rashad al-Alimi, President of the Presidential Leadership Council, Major General Sultan Ali al-Aradah, a member of the Council, and Syrian President Ahmed al-Sharaa, held on the sidelines of the extraordinary Arab Summit in Cairo, Egypt, which was also attended by Syrian Foreign Minister Asaad al-Shaibani.

In June 2025, the Ministry of Foreign Affairs of the Syrian transitional government issued a decision ordering Ala to return to Damascus and granting him until early August 2025 to arrange his affairs. However, immediately after the specified period ended, Ala traveled to Switzerland, where he applied for political asylum and formally submitted his resignation from his position in a letter to the ministry. In August 2026, he was succeeded by Syrian diplomat Yahya Diab.
