= Syrian Constitution of 1973 =

Syrian constitution from 1973 to 2012

Constitution of the Syrian Arab Republic

Overview
- Original title: دستور الجمهورية العربية السورية
- Jurisdiction: Ba'athist Syria
- Date effective: 13 March 1973
- System: Unitary one-party presidential republic

Government structure
- Branches: Three (executive, legislative and judiciary)
- Head of state: President
- Chambers: Unicameral (People's Assembly)
- Executive: President-led Council of Ministers; Prime Minister as head of government
- Judiciary: Supreme Judicial Council, Supreme Constitutional Court
- Federalism: Unitary

History
- Repealed: 27 February 2012
- Amendments: Three
- Last amended: 11 June 2000
- Supersedes: Provisional Constitution of 1969
- Superseded by: Constitution of 2012

Full text
- Constitution of Syria (1973) at Wikisource
- دستور الجمهورية العربية السورية at Arabic Wikisource

The 1973 Constitution of Syria was the constitution that governed Ba'athist Syria from 13 March 1973 until 27 February 2012. It describes Syria's character to be Arab, democratic, socialist and republican. Further, in line with pan-Arab ideology, it positions the country as a region of the wider Arab world and its people as an integral part of the Arab nation. The constitution entrenched the power of the Arab Socialist Ba'ath Party, and its 8th Article described the party as "the leading party in the society and the state", effectively ruling Syria as a one-party socialist state under emergency laws.

== History ==
The Constitution of 1973 replaced a Provisional Constitution of 1 May 1969. The constitution was amended in 2000 to change the minimum age of the President from 40 to 34. During the Syrian revolution, a new constitution based on the 1973 constitution was put to a referendum, which resulted in its adoption. The new constitution came into force on 27 February 2012, thus superseding the Constitution of 1973.

== Overview ==
The 1973 constitution begins with a Preamble and is then divided into four parts, called Chapters, which are in turn subdivided into Parts (and in some cases Sections) and Articles.

=== Preamble ===
The preamble contains the five main principles of the constitution. First, it defines the Arab nation's aspirations in unity, freedom and socialism and stipulates that the means to achieve these aspirations lie in the wider Arab revolution. Second, within the reality of a divided Arab nation, collective defense will be needed to counter the dangers of imperialism and Zionism. Third, affirms the nation's commitment to the march toward the establishment of socialist order. Fourth, stipulates that individual freedom is a sacred right and that popular democracy is the "ideal formulation which insures for the citizen the exercise of his freedom." Fifth, states that the Arab revolution is an integral part of the wider world liberation movement for freedom, independence and progress.

This constitution serves as a guide for action to our people's masses so that they will continue the battle for liberation and construction guided by its principles and provisions in order to strengthen the positions of our people's struggle and to drive their march toward the aspired future.

=== Chapter 1 ===
Chapter 1 contains 49 articles in four parts and provides the political, economic, educational, and cultural principles and the fundamental rights.

==== Political Principles ====
The first article of the constitution states that "the Syrian Arab Republic is a democratic, popular, socialist, and sovereign state. No part of its territory can be ceded." Article 3 stipulates that Islamic jurisprudence shall be a (not the) main source of legislation. The article was later amended to include that the president must be of the Islamic faith. The constitution does not declare Islam as the state religion. Article 4 declares that Arabic is the official language of the Syrian Arab Republic and that Damascus is the capital of the nation. Article 8 of the constitution defines the Baath Party as the "leading party in the society and the state," and presents the National Progressive Front as the only framework for legal political party participation for citizens.

==== Economic Principles ====
The constitution defines the state economy as a planned socialist economy which aims to end all forms of exploitation. Three forms of property is presented by the constitution: public, collective and individual property. The constitution guarantees that private property shall not be expropriated except for the public interest and in return for fair compensation.

==== Educational and Cultural Principles ====
Article 21 of the constitution defines the goals of the educational and cultural system:

The educational and cultural system aims at creating a socialist nationalist Arab generation which is scientifically minded and attached to its history and land, proud of its heritage, and filled with the spirit of struggle to achieve its nation's objectives of unity, freedom, and socialism, and to serve humanity and its progress.

==== Freedom, Rights and Public Duties ====
The constitution distinguishes between universal human rights that apply to every human being and those that apply to Syrian citizens only. The constitution guarantees the freedom of expression, assembly and religion for all citizens. It stipulates that the state is the guarantor and protector of the citizen's personal freedom and dignity. The constitution guarantees that all citizens will be equal before the law in their rights and duties. It also states that work is a right and duty for every citizen and that the state will undertake to provide work for all citizens.

=== Chapter 2 ===
Chapter 2 contains 81 articles in three parts. It discusses the powers of the Syrian state, including, the legislative authority, the executive authority and the Local People's Councils.

==== Legislative Authority ====
The constitution defines the People's Assembly as a unicameral legislature consisting of 250 members. Members of the People's Assembly are elected to a 4-year term by general, secret, direct and equal ballot. The constitution provides a 50% quota of the People's Assembly to workers and peasants. The powers of the People's Assembly include, nomination of the president, debating cabinet policy, approving the budget and ratification of international treaties. The Assembly can not initiate laws but it has the right to amend and approve them. The president is only liable to the assembly in cases of high treason.

==== Executive Authority ====
===== President of the Republic =====
The constitution stipulates that the President of the Republic is the head of the state, the chief executive officer of the executive authority and the commander-in-chief of the armed forces. The nomination for the presidency is proposed by the Ba'ath Party and approved by the parliament. According to the constitution, the nominee must be Arab Syrian, Muslim and over 34 years of age. The nominee is then confirmed through a referendum for a 7-year term. The constitution does not specify a term limit for the president.

The constitution gives the office of the president great executive and legislative powers. The president is responsible for appointing and dismissing the Council of Ministers, the prime minister, and other top civil servants and military officers as well as members of the High Constitutional Court. The president may also dissolve the People's Assembly and appoint an unlimited number of vice presidents.

===== Cabinet and Council of Ministers =====
The constitution defines the cabinet as the highest executive and administrative body. It consists of the prime minister, the deputy prime minister and the ministers. The constitution states that the ministers are responsible to the president of the republic.

==== Local People's Councils ====
Article 129 of the constitution defines the Local People's Councils as follows:

The Local People's Councils are bodies which exercise their powers within the administrative units in accordance with the law.

=== Chapter 3 ===
Chapter 3 contains 19 articles in three parts. It discusses the structure and powers of the judiciary as well as the process for constitutional amendments.

==== Court Judges and Public Prosecutors ====
The president also presides over the High Judicial Council. The constitution states that verdicts in Syrian courts shall be issued "in the name of the Arab people of Syria." It also stipulates that the Minister of Justice shall preside over the office of the public prosecutor.

==== The Supreme Constitutional Court ====
Article 143 of the constitution defines the oath taken by members of the Supreme Constitutional Court as follows:

"I swear by the Almighty to respect the country's Constitution and laws and to carry out my duty with impartiality and loyalty."

=== Chapter 4 ===
Chapter 4 contains 7 articles and includes general and transitional provisions.

== See also ==
- Constitution of Syria

== Bibliography ==
- Robbers, Gerhard (2007). Encyclopedia of World Constitutions. Facts on File library of world history. New York: Facts On File. ISBN 978-0-8160-6078-8.
