= Khafsin =

Khafsin خفسين
- Village
- Location in Syria
- Coordinates: 35°20′52″N 36°51′20″E
- Country: Syria
- Governorate: Hama
- District: Hama
- Subdistrict: Suran

Population (2004)
  - Total: 960
- Time zone: UTC+3 (AST)
- City Qrya Pcode: C3025

Khafsin (Arabic: خفسين) is a Syrian village located in the Suran Subdistrict in Hama District. According to the Syria Central Bureau of Statistics (CBS), Khafsin had a population of 960 in the 2004 census.
