= Syrian Constitution of 2012 =

Syrian constitution from 2012 to 2024

Constitution of the Syrian Arab Republic

Overview
- Original title: دستور الجمهورية العربية السورية
- Jurisdiction: Ba'athist Syria
- Date effective: 27 February 2012
- System: Unitary one-party presidential republic

Government structure
- Branches: Three (executive, legislative and judiciary)
- Head of state: President
- Chambers: Unicameral (Chamber of Deputies)
- Executive: President-led Council of Ministers responsible to the People's Assembly; Prime Minister as head of government
- Judiciary: Supreme Judicial Council, Supreme Constitutional Court
- Federalism: No
- First legislature: 24 May 2012
- First executive: 23 June 2012
- Repealed: 29 January 2025
- Supersedes: Constitution of 1973
- Superseded by: Constitutional Declaration of the Syrian Arab Republic

Full text
- Translation:Constitution of Syria (2012) at Wikisource
- دستور الجمهورية العربية السورية at Arabic Wikisource

The 2012 Constitution of Syria was the constitution of Ba'athist Syria between 27 February 2012 until the fall of the Assad regime on 8 December 2024. It replaced the 1973 constitution.

Following the 2011 Syrian revolution, Ba'athist Syria drafted a new constitution and put it to a referendum on 26 February 2012, which was unmonitored by international observers. The modifications in the constitution were cosmetic and part of Ba'athist government's response to the nationwide protests. Since the move monopolized power of the Government of Syria and was drafted without consultation outside loyalist circles, Syrian opposition and revolutionary parties boycotted the referendum, resulting in very low participation as per Assad government's data. The referendum resulted in the adoption of the new constitution, which came into force on 27 February 2012.

After the fall of the Assad regime, spokesman of the Syrian transitional government stated that during the government's three-month transition term, the Ba'athist constitution and parliament was suspended, adding that a 'judicial and human rights committee' would be established to review the constitution prior to making amendments. On 29 January 2025, during the Syrian Revolution Victory Conference, Hassan Abdul Ghani, the spokesman for the Military Operations Command, announced the repeal of the 2012 Syrian constitution. It was subsequently replaced by the Constitutional Declaration on 13 March 2025.

== Overview ==
The previous constitution of 2012 consolidated the authoritarian structure and centralized it under a highly powerful presidency. It also maintains Ba'ath party's explicitly Arab nationalist stance and advocates regional integration as a means for achieving "Arab Unity". The constitution declares Arabic as the official language of the country.

The Constitution is divided into 6 parts (excluding the Introduction) which are called Chapters.

- Introduction
- Chapter 1: Basic Principles
- Chapter 2: Rights, Freedoms and the Rule of Law
- Chapter 3: State Authorities
- Chapter 4: The Supreme Constitutional Court
- Chapter 5: Amending the Constitution
- Chapter 6: General and Transitional Provisions

=== Modifications ===
Notable changes in the constitution include:

- It abolished the old article 8, which had entrenched the power of the Ba'ath party. The new article 8 read: "The political system is based on the principle of political pluralism, and rule is only obtained and exercised democratically through voting", while stating that legal mechanisms "shall regulate the provisions and procedures related to the formation of political parties"
- In a new article 88, it limited the term of office for the president to seven years with a maximum of one re-election. However, Bashar al-Assad is empowered to extend his mandate beyond this time-period as per article 87, which obliges the President to continue his rule "if no new head of state is elected".

=== Expansion of presidential powers ===
Articles 83-150 of the new constitution increased the Presidential powers in the executive, legislature and judiciary. The executive role of the Syrian President presumes his control over all three branches, bestowing the President with unchecked powers through at least 21 articles. Some of the extraordinary powers bestowed by the 2012 Constitution that elevates the Presidential role include:

- Article 97 bestows the President with the authority to appoint and dismiss the Prime Minister, Council of Ministers and their deputies.
- "President of the Republic formulates general policies of the state and oversees implementation." (Article 98)
- Article 100 grants veto powers to the President to accept or reject laws passed by the legislature known as the People's Assembly.
- Article 101 charges President with the power to "pass decrees, decisions and orders". Article 113 also stipulates that the President has powers to bypass the People's Assembly to pass laws.
- Article 103 entrusts the President with the power to declare or repeal a "state of emergency" during a session with his Council of Ministers.
- Article 105 designates the President as "Commander in Chief of the army and armed forces" who enjoys its "absolute authority" and directly oversees "all the decisions necessary to exercise this authority." These include "decisions regarding military power, declaring war and concluding peace agreements." (article 102)
- "President of the Republic appoints civilian and military employees and ends their services." (Article 106)
- "The President of the Republic concludes international treaties and agreements and revokes them." (Article 107)
- Article 111 entitles the President to "dissolve the People's Assembly" as per his orders.
- Article 112 enables the President to propose legislation to the parliament.
- Article 113 charges the President with the role of legislative authority if the parliament is not in session and also during the parliamentary sessions "if absolute necessity requires".
- Article 114 allows the President to take quick, extraordinary measures if he determines the country to be in "grave danger"
- President can establish "special bodies, councils and committees" which operate independently of the constitutional structures (Article 115)
- "The President of the Council of Ministers, his deputies and ministers are responsible before the president." (Article 121)
- Article 124 empowers the President to refer the Prime Minister and his Council of Ministers to a court of law for civil or criminal offenses. An indictment results in their suspension, and may also be accompanied by dismissal if the President decides so.
- "Supreme Judicial Council is headed by the President of the Republic." (Article 133)
- Article 141 sub-ordinates the Supreme Constitutional Court to the President.

== Criticism ==
The 2012 Constitution remained unrecognized by almost all bodies of the Syrian opposition, which boycotted the referendum. The constitution was drafted by Ba'athist loyalists and was part of Assad regime's attempts to monopolise its power and suppress the 2011-12 Syrian protests. International experts have assessed that the constitution has no "checks and balances", making it unfeasible for a political transition. Syrian opposition activists have demanded the repeal of at least 21 clauses in the Constitution which bestows unrestrained powers on the President, banishment of emergency courts and the withdrawal of more than 20 emergency edicts as the precondition to start a meaningful transition process. Popular Front for Change and Liberation, the sole opposition front that had initially participated in the Syrian People's Assembly, withdrew its recognition in 2016 after Bashar al-Assad's scuttling of the Geneva negotiations.
