= President of Syria =

Head of state and government

President of the Syrian Arab Republic
- رئيس الجمهورية العربية السورية (Arabic)
- Emblem of Syria

- Flag of Syria

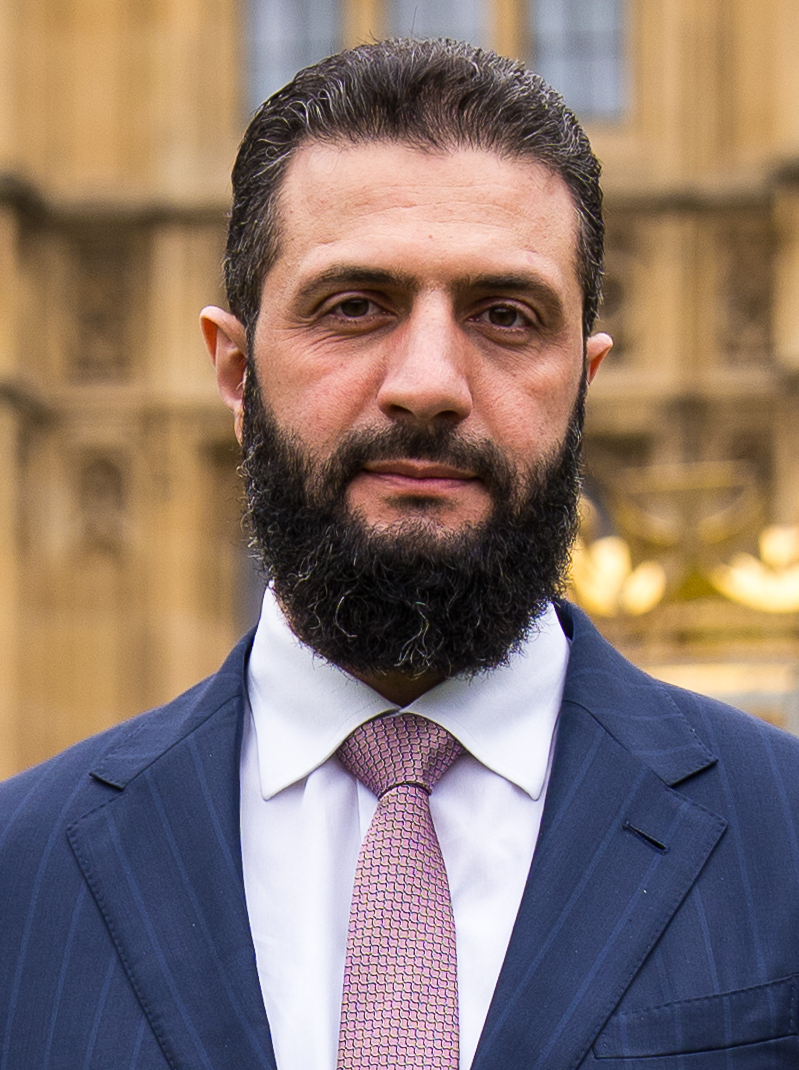
- Incumbent; Ahmed al-Sharaa since 29 January 2025
- Executive branch of the Government of Syria
- Style: Mr. President (informal); His Excellency (diplomatic)
- Type: Head of state; Head of government; Commander-in-chief
- Member of: Cabinet of Syria; National Security Council
- Residence: People's Palace
- Seat: Damascus
- Term length: Not fixed
- Constituting instrument: Constitutional Declaration (2025)
- Precursor: Prime Minister
- Formation: 29 June 1922; 104 years ago 29 January 2025; 19 months ago (current form)
- First holder: Subhi Barakat (French Mandate); Shukri al-Quwatli (first president of post-independence Syria)
- Deputy: Vice President

The president of Syria, officially the president of the Syrian Arab Republic (Arabic: رئيس الجمهورية العربية السورية, romanized: Ra'īs al-Jumhūriyyah al-ʿArabiyyah as-Sūriyyah), is the head of state and head of government of Syria. The president directs the executive branch of the Syrian government and serves as the commander-in-chief of the Syrian Armed Forces. The president represents the nation in international relations and formalizes treaties with foreign countries.

In 1922, French authorities created the Syrian Federation under the Mandate for Syria and Lebanon, with Subhi Barakat serving as its president. The federation was short-lived and was replaced by the State of Syria in 1925. Barakat briefly remained president until the outbreak of the Great Syrian Revolt later that year, which led to his resignation. He was succeeded by Ahmad Nami, who served as president until his removal in 1928.

In the following years, the Syrian presidency underwent several changes in leadership, including a coup by Husni al-Za'im in March 1949, followed by another led by Adib Shishakli in 1951. Following the 1958 referendum, Syria joined the United Arab Republic, and its president Gamal Nasser, also became the Syrian president in the same referendum. This lasted for three years until the 1961 coup, when Syria restored its independence and subsequently restored the 1950 constitution until the Ba'athist-led 1963 Syrian coup d'état that established a one-party state in Syria.

Internal power struggles within Ba'athist factions would led to further coups in 1966 and 1970, with the latter bringing Hafez al-Assad to power. Under Assad, Syria became a hereditary dictatorship. After his death in 2000, his son Bashar al-Assad succeeded him and ruled until his overthrow in 2024. Following Assad's fall, Ahmed al-Sharaa, commander of Hay'at Tahrir al-Sham at the time, assumed the de facto duties of head of state until his official appointment as president by the Syrian General Command during the Syrian Revolution Victory Conference.

After the fall of the Assad regime, a constitutional declaration was implemented on 13 March 2025 and remains in effect today. The constitutional declaration establishes Syria as a presidential system, with executive power vested in the president. It grants the president the authority to establish executive, regulatory, and control measures, and to issue presidential orders and decisions in accordance with the law. The president's official residence is the People's Palace, located in the capital, Damascus. The position is currently held by Ahmed al-Sharaa in a transitional capacity since 29 January 2025.

== History ==
=== Mandatory Syria ===
In 1922, French authorities created the Syrian Federation under the Mandate for Syria and Lebanon, and Subhi Barakat was its president. The federation system did not last, and was replaced as the State of Syria by 1925. Barakat briefly retained the role of president until the beginning of the Great Syrian Revolt that year caused him to resign. Ahmad Nami replaced Barakat as president, until he was removed in 1928. By 1930, Syrian pressure led the French authorities to promulgate the Syrian Constitution of 1930, establishing the First Syrian Republic. Under the constitution, the president must be a Muslim, and would be elected by a majority of the Syrian parliament.

=== Post-independence ===
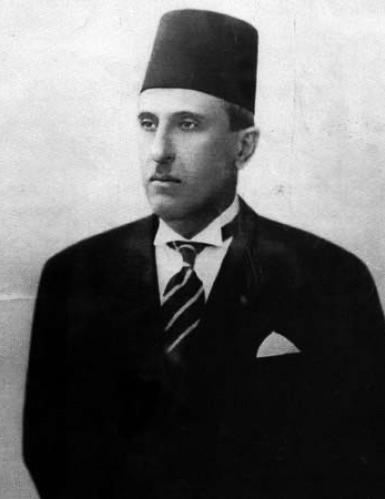
Shukri al-Quwatli, the first president of post-independence Syria

Following the withdrawal of French troops from Syria in 1946, Syrian officials approved the Syrian Constitution of 1950, which maintained a parliamentary system. As such, the president would be elected by a majority of parliament. In the following years, Syria's presidency experienced several upheavals, including by Husni al-Za'im following his March 1949 coup and later by Adib Shishakli in through the 1951 coup. During Shishakli's rule, he published the Syrian Constitution of 1953, which established a presidential system with direct elections to the presidency. However, this constitution lasted less than a year, as the reinstated president Hashim al-Atassi returned the country to the 1950 constitution following the 1954 coup only a year later. Following the 1958 referendum, Syria joined the United Arab Republic, and its president, Gamal Nasser, also became the Syrian president in the same referendum. This lasted for three years until the 1961 coup, when Syria restored its independence and the 1950 constitution. Nazim al-Qudsi was the last democratically elected President of Syria before the 1963 Syrian coup d'état.

=== Ba'athist Syria (1963–2024) ===
Following the 1963 Syrian coup d'état, the first decision of the "Revolution Command Council," chaired by Lu'ay al-Atassi, was to suspend the provisional constitution of the United Arab Republic, arrest President Nazim al-Qudsi and Prime Minister Khalid al-Azm, and impose a state of emergency that lasted for 48 years until it was lifted in April 2011. A new Provisional Constitution was adopted on 25 April 1964, which itself was replaced by the Provisional Constitution of 1 May 1969.

Another coup in 1966 brought Salah Jadid to de facto power, while Nureddin al-Atassi assumed the presidency. In 1970, Jadid and al-Atassi were overthrown by Hafez al-Assad during the Corrective Movement.

==== Hafez al-Assad (1971–2000) ====
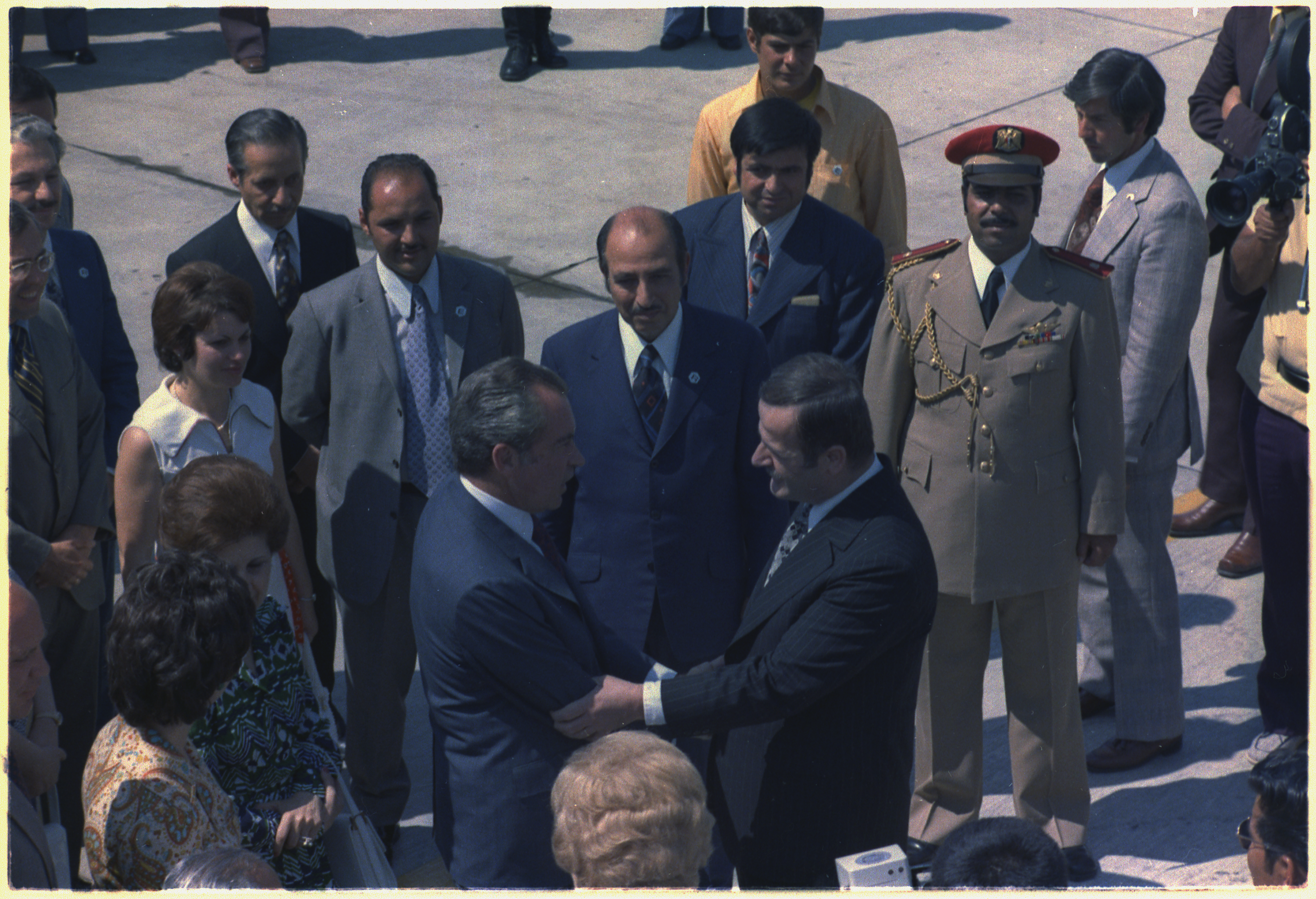
Hafez al-Assad greeting Richard Nixon on the latter's arrival at Damascus Airport, 15 July 1974

General Hafez al-Assad became prime minister, and was elected president in March 1971. He launched series of huge reforms and transformed a neo-Ba'athist party state into a dictatorship frequently described as totalitarian, marked by his pervasive grip on the party, armed forces, secret police, media, education sector, religious and cultural spheres, urban planning, economic activity, and all aspects of civil society. The cult of personality became a core tenet of Assadist ideology, which espoused that Assad family was destined to rule perennially.

On 31 January 1973, Hafez al-Assad implemented a new constitution, which led to a national crisis. Unlike previous constitutions, this one did not require that the president of Syria must be a Muslim, leading to fierce demonstrations in Hama, Homs and Aleppo. The main objection to the constitution from demonstrators was that Islam was not specified as the state religion. In response to riots, the Syrian Constitution of 1973 was amended to stipulate that Islam was the religion of the president. The constitution has been amended twice. Article 6 was amended in 1981. After securing his control over the Syrian government, Assad initially chose his brother, Rifaat al-Assad, as his successor, but Rifaat's attempted power grab while Hafez was in a coma in 1984 led to his exile in Europe. Following the incident, Bassel al-Assad was groomed to succeed his father. Hafez's efforts to make Bassel the next president of Syria intensified in the early 1990s; after Hafez's election victory in 1991 in an election where Hafez was the only candidate, the president was publicly referred to as "Abu Basil" (Father of Bassel).

==== Bashar al-Assad (2000–2024) ====
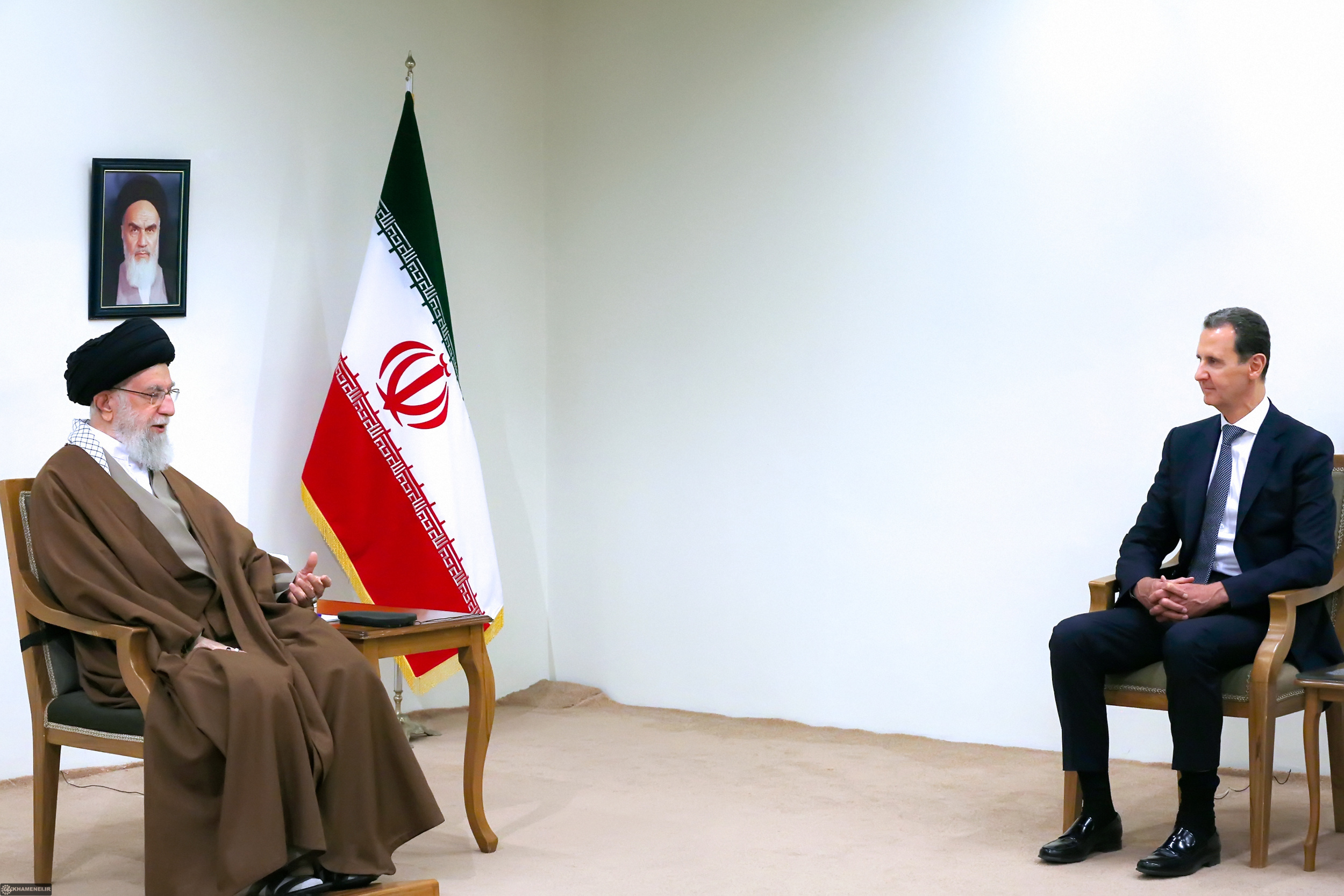
Bashar al-Assad with Iranian supreme leader Ali Khamenei, 8 May 2022

Shortly after Bassel died in a car accident in 1994, Bashar al-Assad was recalled to the Syrian Army. State propaganda soon began elevating Bashar's public image as "the hope of the masses" to prepare the public for a continuation of the rule of the Assad family. Soon after the death of Bassel, Hafez al-Assad decided to make Bashar the new heir apparent. After the death of Hafez al-Assad on 10 June 2000, the Constitution was amended. The minimum age requirement for the presidency was lowered from 40 to 34, which was Bashar's age at the time. A 9-member committee was founded, headed by Abdul Halim Khaddam, to oversee the transition period. He was appointed by this committee as interim President of Syria on 10 June and was in consideration to be Assad's permanent successor, but instead helped Assad's son, Bashar.

The sole candidate of the presidential referendum, Bashar al-Assad was subsequently confirmed president on 10 July 2000, with 97.29% support for his leadership. On 17 July 2000, Assad became president, succeeding his father, Hafez. In line with his role as President of Syria, he was also appointed the commander-in-chief of the Syrian Armed Forces and Regional Secretary of the Ba'ath Party. The existing personality cult portrays him as the "Young Leader" and the "Hope of the People." Drawing influence from North Korea's hereditary leadership model, official propaganda in Syria ascribed divine features to the Assad family, and reveres the Assad patriarchs as the founding fathers of modern Syria.

A new constitution was approved in February 2012 after the start of the Syrian revolution. A series of state elections were held every seven years which Assad won with overwhelming majority of votes. The elections are unanimously regarded by independent observers as a sham process and boycotted by the opposition. (Note: Sources:) (Note: Sources:) The last two elections – held in 2014 and 2021 – were conducted only in areas controlled by the Syrian government during the country's ongoing civil war and condemned by the United Nations. The 2012 constitution ceased to be in effect after the fall of the Assad regime on 8 December 2024 and was officially phased out on 29 January 2025.

=== Transitional period (2024–present) ===
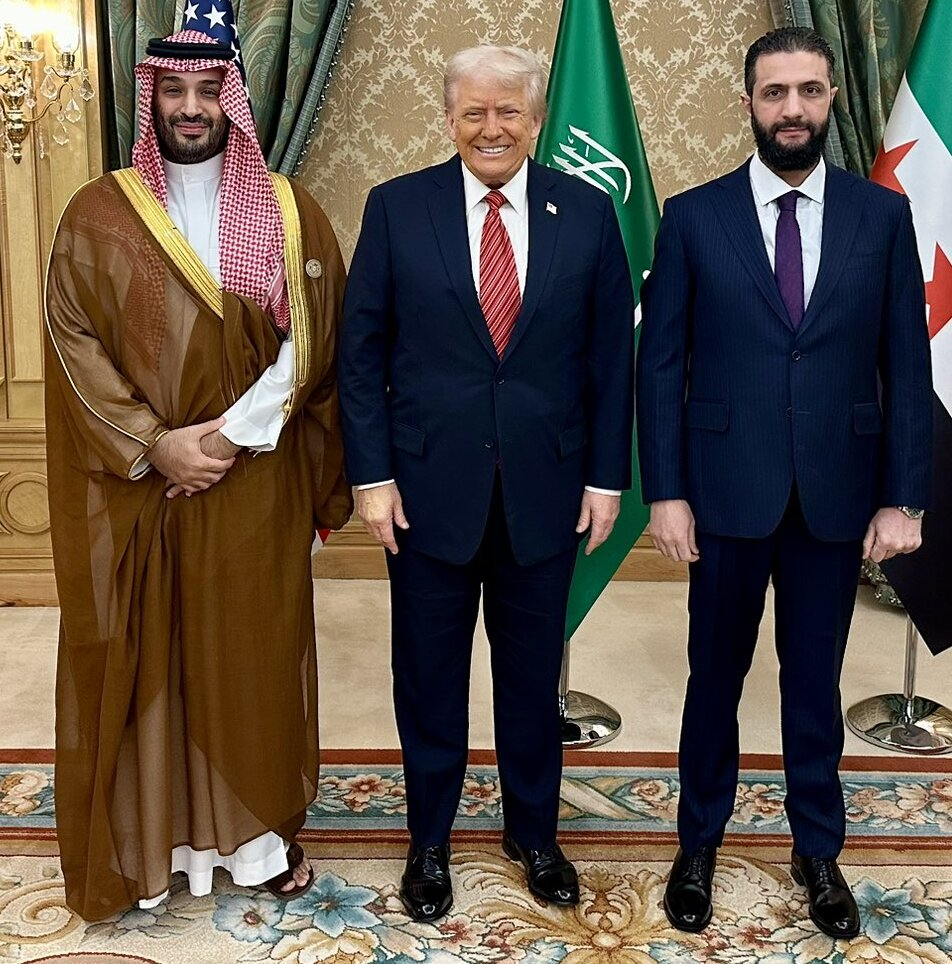
Ahmed al-Sharaa with US President Donald Trump and Crown Prince of Saudi Arabia Mohammed bin Salman in Riyadh, Saudi Arabia, 14 May 2025

After the fall of the Assad regime, the position became vacant on 8 December 2024. The duties of the head of state were carried out by the caretaker government, with Ahmed al-Sharaa serving as the de facto leader as the commander of Hayat Tahrir al-Sham and head of the new Syrian administration. In an interview with al-Arabiya on 29 December, al-Sharaa said that he expected the process of writing a new constitution of Syria to take two or three years, with elections expected after four years.

==== Appointment of Ahmed al-Sharaa ====
On 29 January 2025, during the Syrian Revolution Victory Conference in Damascus, the Syrian General Command officially appointed al-Sharaa as president for the transitional period. Following his appointment, al-Sharaa delivered a brief speech outlining the government's immediate priorities, which included filling the power vacuum, maintaining civil peace, building state institutions, developing the economy, and restoring Syria's international and regional standing. In his first address as president on 31 January, al-Sharaa also announced plans to issue a “constitutional declaration” to serve as a legal reference following the repeal of the Syrian Constitution of 2012.

==== Constitutional Declaration and transitional period ====
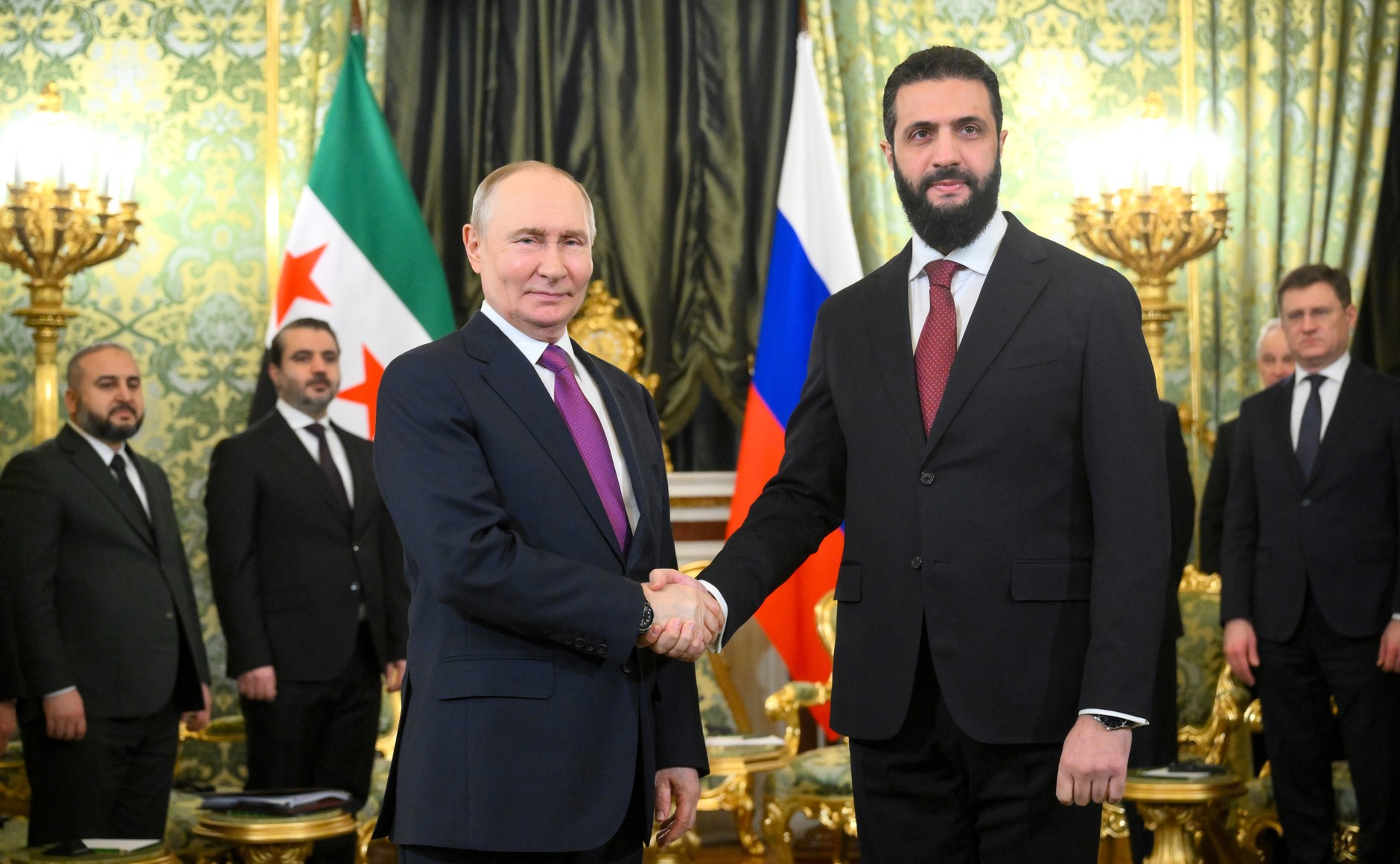
Ahmed al-Sharaa with Russian president Vladimir Putin, 28 January 2026

On 12 February 2025, the caretaker government announced the formation of a preparatory committee for the then-upcoming Syrian National Dialogue Conference, which comprised seven members: Hassan al-Daghim, Maher Alloush, Mohammed Mastet, Youssef al-Hijr, Mustafa al-Mousa, Hind Kabawat, and Houda Atassi. On 2 March, al-Sharaa declared the establishment of a committee tasked with drafting a constitutional declaration to guide the country's transition following the ousting of the Assad regime, and on 13 March he signed a constitutional declaration for a five-year transitional period, enshrining Islamic law as a primary source of jurisprudence and promising to protect the rights of all of Syria's ethnic and religious groups.

The Constitutional Declaration establishes a presidential system in which executive power is held by the president, who appoints the ministers, without the position of prime minister. On 29 March, al-Sharaa announced the Syrian transitional government at a ceremony at the People's Palace in Damascus, where the new ministers were sworn in and delivered speeches outlining their agendas, replacing the caretaker government that had been formed following the fall of the Assad regime.

The official United Nations list of heads of state and government of member states was updated in July 2025 to list Ahmed al-Sharaa as the "President of the Syrian Arab Republic" and as the head of state. On 6 December, at the Doha Forum, al-Sharaa told Christiane Amanpour, CNN’s Chief International Anchor, that the national dialogue conference had resulted in a temporary constitutional declaration granting him a five-year mandate to enact new laws and draft a new constitution ahead of elections scheduled four years later.

== Powers and roles ==
=== Ba'athist Syria (1963–2024) ===
The 1973 Constitution of Ba'athist Syria made the president head of state, chief executive, and commander-in-chief. Candidates were nominated by the Ba'ath Party, approved by parliament, and confirmed by referendum for a renewable seven-year term. The president held extensive powers, including appointing and dismissing ministers, senior officials, and judges, as well as dissolving parliament and appointing vice presidents. The 2012 Constitution expanded these powers further, granting the president broad control over the executive, legislature, and judiciary. It remained in force until the fall of the Assad regime in December 2024 and was replaced by the Constitutional Declaration of the Syrian Arab Republic on 13 March 2025.

=== Transitional period (2025–present) ===
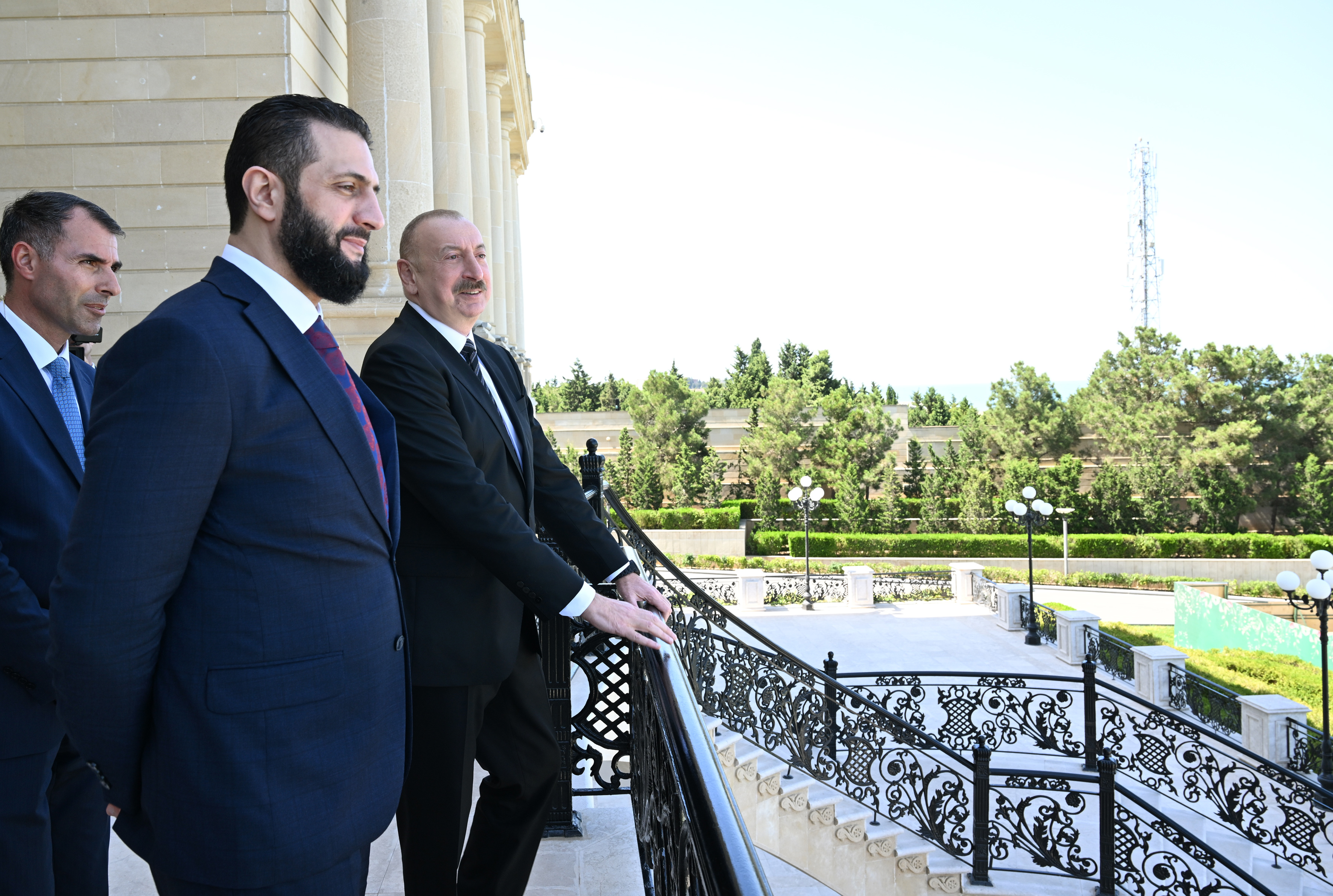
Ahmed al-Sharaa with Azerbaijani president Ilham Aliyev, 12 July 2025

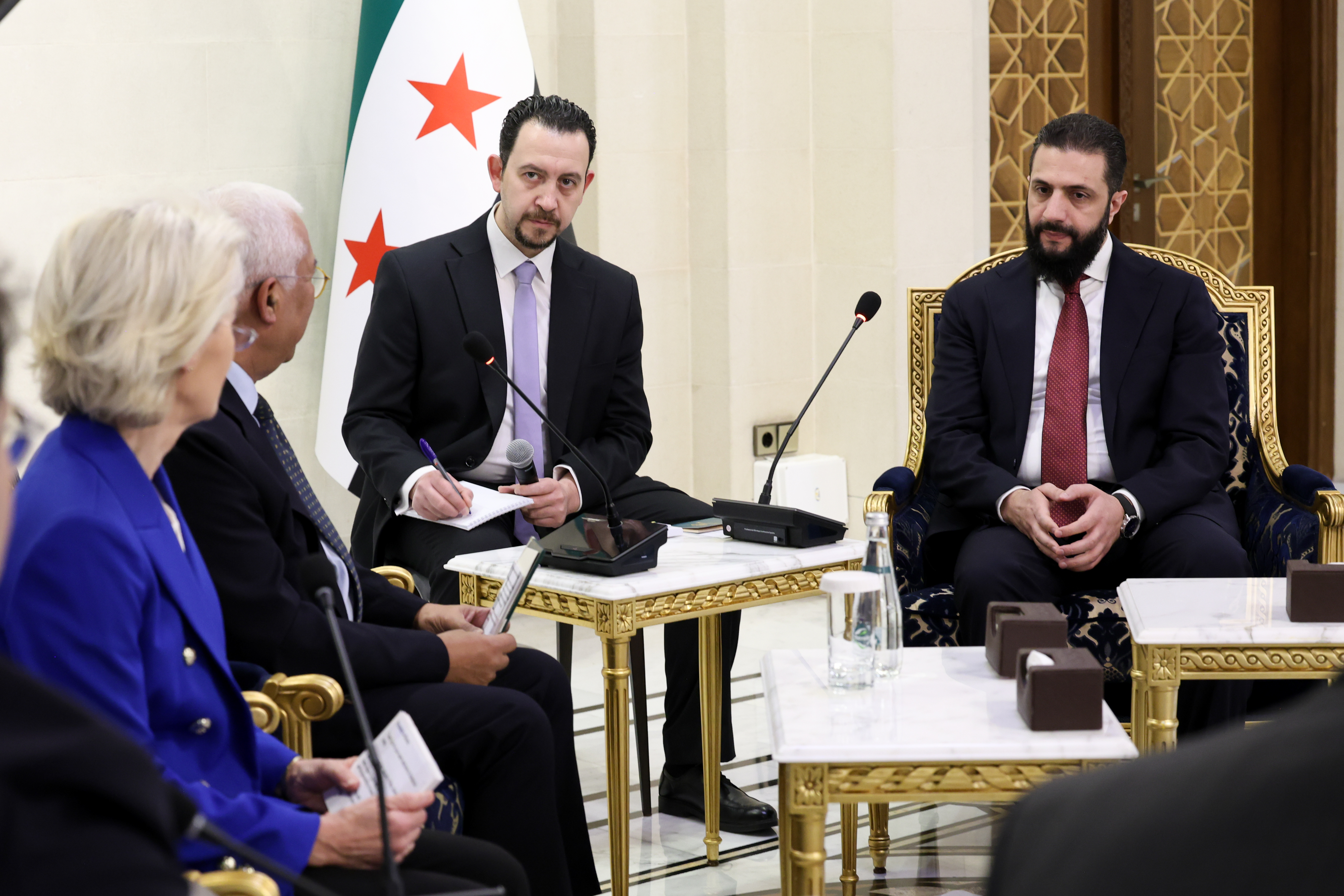
Ahmed al-Sharaa with European Commission President Ursula von der Leyen and European Council President António Costa, 9 January 2026

Under the Constitutional Declaration, the President of the Syrian Arab Republic and the ministers exercise executive power within the limits stipulated in the Constitutional Declaration. In practice, the President serves as both head of state and head of government. The President also serves as the commander-in-chief of the Syrian Armed Forces and is responsible for:

- Managing national governance
- Preserving territorial integrity and security
- Protecting the interests of the people

The president has the authority to:

- Appoint, remove, and accept the resignations of ministers
- Establish executive, regulatory, and control measures, as well as issue presidential orders and decisions following the law
- Act as the state's representative in international relations and formalize treaties with foreign nations and international organizations
- Declare general mobilization and war with the approval of the National Security Council
- Grant special pardons and restore honor
- Appoint and dismiss heads of diplomatic missions abroad and receive the credentials of foreign diplomatic representatives in Syria
- Propose laws, issue laws approved by the People's Assembly, and veto laws within one month of receipt. If the People's Assembly passes a veto law with a two-thirds majority, the president is required to enact it by decree.

In the event of a severe threat to national unity, sovereignty, or the proper functioning of state institutions, the president may:

- Impose a state of emergency, either fully or partially, for up to three months, after:
  - Securing approval from the National Security Council
  - Consulting with the speaker of the People's Assembly and the president of the Constitutional Court
- Extended only with the approval of the People’s Assembly and may not be extended for a second time without the approval of the People’s Assembly.

According to Article 42 of the Constitutional Declaration, the executive authority shall undertake the following:

- Implement approved laws, plans, and programmes.
- Manage state affairs and implement public policies that achieve stability and development.
- Prepare draft laws for the President to propose to the People’s Assembly.
- Prepare general plans for the state.
- Manage the state’s public resources and ensure their effective and transparent use.
- Rebuild public institutions and strengthen the rule of law and good governance.
- Build the security institution to strengthen internal security and stability and protect citizens’ rights and freedoms.
- Build a professional national army whose mission is to defend the country’s borders and sovereignty and protect the people with patriotism and loyalty, while fully adhering to the laws in force.
- Strengthen international relations and cooperation with international organizations to achieve national interests.

== Selection process ==
=== Election ===
A presidential election in Syria is planned to take place within five years of the fall of the Assad regime in December 2024. Until then, Syria will be governed by a transitional government led by Syrian President Ahmed al-Sharaa. The last Syrian presidential election in Ba'athist Syria was held in 2021, before its overthrow during the 2024 Syrian opposition offensive.

In a September 2025 interview with 60 Minutes, al-Sharaa said elections would be held once Syria's infrastructure and citizens' records are restored. He stated that he wants Syria to be a place where every person can vote. On 17 September 2026, UN Deputy Special Envoy for Syria Claudio Cordone announced that he had participated in discussions with Syrian officials on organizing presidential and parliamentary elections, "with UN electoral assistance," at the end of the transition period in three and a half years.

=== Religion ===
Article 3 of the Constitutional Declaration states, "The religion of the President of the Republic is Islam; Islamic jurisprudence is the principal source of legislation.

=== Inauguration ===
The Constitutional Declaration provides the following oath or affirmation for the president, which must be taken before the People's Assembly.

I swear by Almighty God to faithfully uphold the sovereignty of the State, the unity of the country, the integrity of its territories, and the independence of its decision, and to defend them. I shall respect the law, safeguard the interests of the people, and strive with all sincerity and honesty to secure a decent life for them, achieve justice among them, and establish noble values and virtuous morals.

— Constitutional Declaration, Article 33, Sec. 2

== Incumbency ==
=== Official residence ===
Presidential residences

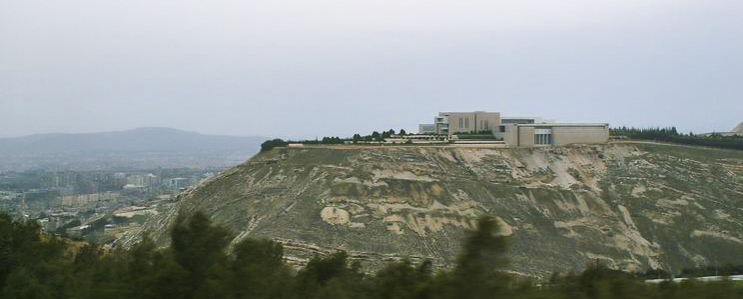
People's Palace, the official residence

The People's Palace is the official residence of the President of Syria. It is located in the western part of Damascus, on Mount Mezzeh, just north of the Mezzeh neighborhood and next to Mount Qasioun, overlooking the city. The entire plateau of Mount Mezzeh is part of the palace compound, which is surrounded by a security wall and guard watchtowers. In front of the building is a large fountain, and the palace itself mostly consists of empty rooms clad in Carrara marble. The Syrian caretaker government, and later the transitional government, began using the palace for diplomatic events.

Before the construction of the new People's Palace on Mount Mezzeh in the early 1990s, Tishreen Palace served as the primary residence of the Assad family. On 8 December 2024, during the fall of the Assad regime, anti-Assad forces took control of the palace. After the regime fell, Syrians ransacked and looted the palace, inviting much of the public.

=== Protection ===
The Syrian Republican Guard (SRG), also known as the Presidential Guard, is the primary security unit of the Syrian Army. Before the fall of the Assad regime, it reportedly consisted of around 60,000 personnel and was organized into two mechanized divisions. Its primary mission was to protect the Syrian capital, Damascus, from both foreign and domestic threats. Prior to the Syrian civil war, the Republican Guard was the only Syrian military unit permitted to operate within the capital. In addition to defending Damascus, the SRG was responsible for protecting the President and key government facilities, including the people's palace.

Since the fall of the Assad regime, the status of the equipment used by the Republican Guard is currently unknown. However, during President Ahmed al-Sharaa's visit to Aleppo, his security detail, possibly part of the Republican Guard, was seen equipped with AKS-74U carbines. During his visits to Deir ez-Zor Governorate and Aleppo, his security detail was also seen carrying Kale KCR assault rifles. Under the Syrian transitional government, the Syrian Republican Guard operates several Chevrolet Suburbans and Toyota Land Cruisers.

=== Travel ===
Prior to the fall of the Assad regime, the Ba'athist-led government of Syria operated a Dassault Falcon 900 in 2016, alongside a Dassault Falcon 20E and a Dassault Falcon 50, all of which used special Syrianair callsigns. Former President Bashar al-Assad used a Syrianair Airbus A320 during a landmark trip to Saudi Arabia.

=== Vacancies and succession ===
Article 34 of the Constitutional Declaration states, "In the event of a vacancy in the presidency, the Vice President shall assume the powers of the President of the Republic."

== See also ==
- List of heads of state of Syria
- List of Syrian monarchs
- First Lady of Syria

== Sources ==
- Solomon, Christopher (2022). "1:Introduction". In Search of Greater Syria: The History and Politics of the Syrian Social Nationalist Party. New York: I.B. Tauris. ISBN 978-1-8386-0640-4.
- Zisser, Eyal (2007). Commanding Syria: Bashar Al-Asad And the First Years in Power. I.B. Tauris. ISBN 978-1-84511-153-3.
