= Independence Day (Syria) =

Public holiday in Syria

Independence Day عيد الجلاء
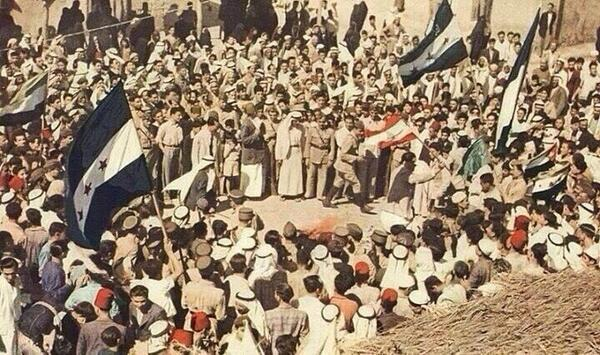
- Residents of Deir ez-Zor burning French books on the eve of Syria's independence from France on April 17, 1946
- Also called: Independence Day
- Observed by: Syria
- Type: National
- Significance: Departure of the last French soldier and Syria's proclamation of independence
- Observances: Parades, flowers
- Date: 17 April
- Frequency: Annual

Independence Day is Syria's National Day commemorating the evacuation of the last French soldier at the end of the French mandate of Syria on 17 April 1946 after Syria's proclamation of full independence on 27 September 1941.

== History ==
After World War I, the Ottoman Empire was divided into several new independent states, creating the modern Arab world and the Republic of Turkey. Following the Sykes–Picot Agreement between France, the United Kingdom, and Russia in 1916, the League of Nations granted France mandates over present-day Syria and Lebanon in 1923.

France divided the region into six states based in part on the sectarian makeup on the ground in Syria. However, nearly all the Syrian sects were hostile to the French mandate and to the division it created. This was best demonstrated by the numerous revolts, including the 1925 Hama uprising, that the French encountered in the Syrian states. A six-day general strike in the spring of 1936 paralyzed the country and in part forced the French government to negotiate the Franco-Syrian Treaty of Independence with the National Bloc. However, the French did not withdraw right away after the treaty was signed in the autumn of 1936.

With the fall of France in 1940 during World War II, Syria came under the control of the Vichy Government until the British and Free France invaded and occupied the country in July 1941. Syria proclaimed its independence in 1941 but it was not until 1 January 1944 that it was recognized as an independent republic. With the advent of the Levant Crisis in 1945, prompted by a British invasion authorised by Sir Winston Churchill, the French evacuated the last of their troops on 17 April 1946. The French regime had proposed to depart on 18 April, Good Friday in 1946, but Syrian officials opted for a slightly earlier date to avoid holding ceremonies on the Christian holiday.

In 2018, with the Syrian Civil War ongoing, and merely days after the Douma chemical attack and the retaliatory military strikes carried out by the US, UK, and France, Independence Day commemorative activities held in Umayyad Square in Damascus were attended by thousands of people carrying Syrian flags.

As of 2021, Independence Day is observed by the Autonomous Administration of North and East Syria.

== See also ==
- Modern history of Syria
