= Supreme Judicial Council of Syria =

Judicial body of Syria

- مجلس القضاء الأعلى في سوريا
- Coat of arms of Syria
- Formation: 1971; 55 years ago
- Headquarters: Damascus, Syria
- Region served: Syrian Arab Republic
- Leader: vacant

The Supreme Judicial Council of Syria (Arabic: مجلس القضاء الأعلى في سوريا) is the highest judicial authority in Syria.

== Competences ==
=== Ba'athist Syria ===
The Council was charged with the appointment, transfer and dismissal of judges. It was composed of senior civil judges and chaired by the President of Syria. The independence of the judiciary was meant to be guaranteed by President in his role as chairman of the High Judicial Council, according to Article 131 of the Constitution. Article 133 stipulated that judges be autonomous and subject to no authority other than the law.

=== Current ===
Following the fall of the Assad regime, the Council was reconstituted, with a group of judges from the Court of Cassation in the Syrian Salvation Government becoming the new members. Article 43 of the Constitutional Declaration states that the judiciary is independent, and judges are subject only to the law, while the Supreme Judicial Council ensures the proper functioning of the judiciary and upholds its independence. Meanwhile, Article 51 stipulated that all current law continue to apply unless amended or repealed. As such, the Council still operates under the old Judicial Authority Law for the time being.
