= Ba'athist Syria =

Syrian state from 1963 to 2024

Syrian Arab Republic اَلْجُمْهُورِيَّةُ ٱلْعَرَبِيَّةُ ٱلْسُوْرِيَّة (Arabic) al-Jumhūriyyah al-ʿArabiyyah as-Sūriyyah
- 1963–2024
- Flag (1980–2024) Emblem (1980–2024)
- Motto: وَحْدَةٌ، حُرِّيَّةٌ، اِشْتِرَاكِيَّةٌ Waḥda, Ḥurriyya, Ishtirākiyya "Unity, Freedom, Socialism"
- Anthem: حُمَاةَ الدَّيَّارِ Ḥumāt ad-Diyār "Guardians of the Homeland"
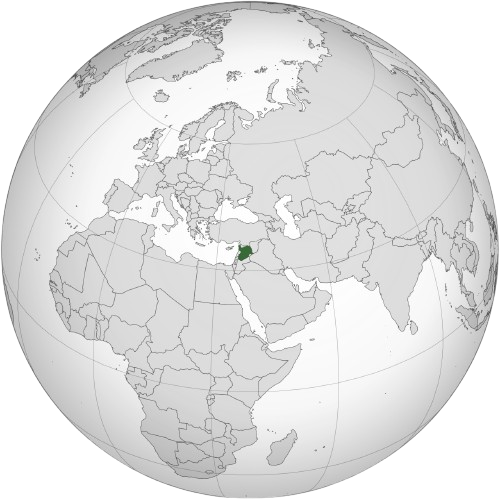
- Ba'athist Syria Hatay dispute and Israeli-occupied territories Ba'athist Syria
- Capital and largest city: Damascus; 33°30′N 36°18′E
- Official languages: Arabic
- Ethnic groups (2024): 80–90% Arabs; 9–10% Kurds; 1–10% others
- Religion (2021): 87% Islam; 74% Sunni Islam; 13% Alawites and other Shia Islam; 10% Christianity; 3% Druze
- Demonym: Syrian
- Government: Unitary one-party presidential republic: under a totalitarian military dictatorship (1963–1971); under a totalitarian hereditary dictatorship (1971–2024)
- President
  - 1963 (first): Lu'ay al-Atassi
  - 2000–2024 (last): Bashar al-Assad
- Prime Minister
  - 1963 (first): Khalid al-Azm
  - 2024 (last): Mohammad Ghazi al-Jalali
- Vice President
  - 1963–1964 (first): Muhammad Umran
  - 2006–2024 (last): Najah al-Attar
  - 2024 (last): Faisal Mekdad
- Legislature: People's Assembly
- Historical era: Cold War; Arab Cold War; War on terror; Arab Spring; Arab Winter
  - Ba'athist coup: 8 March 1963
  - Neo-Ba'athist coup: 21–23 February 1966
  - Six-Day War: 5–10 June 1967
  - Assadist coup: 13–16 November 1970
  - Civil war began: 15 March 2011
  - Syrian opposition offensives: 27 November 2024
  - Regime downfall: 8 December 2024

Area
  - Total: 185,180 km^{2} (71,500 sq mi) (87th)
  - Water (%): 1.1

Population
  - 2024 estimate: 24,672,760
  - Density: 134.0/km^{2} (347.1/sq mi)
- GDP (PPP): 2020 estimate
  - Total: $50.28 billion
  - Per capita: $2,900
- GDP (nominal): 2020 estimate
  - Total: $11.08 billion
  - Per capita: $533
- Gini (2022): 26.6 low inequality
- HDI (2022): 0.557 medium
- Currency: Syrian pound (SYP)
- Time zone: UTC+3 (Arabia Standard Time)
- Calling code: +963
- ISO 3166 code: SY
- Internet TLD: .sy سوريا.
Preceded by	Succeeded by
1963: Second Syrian Republic	2024: Transitional period
- Today part of: Syria (Note: Does not include Israel's occupation of the Golan Heights.)

Ba'athist Syria, officially the Syrian Arab Republic, (Note: Arabic: اَلْجُمْهُورِيَّةُ ٱلْعَرَبِيَّةُ ٱلْسُوْرِيَّة, romanized: al-Jumhūriyyah al-ʿArabiyyah as-Sūriyyah) was the Syrian state between 1963 and 2024 under the one-party rule of the Syrian regional branch of the Arab Socialist Ba'ath Party. From 1970 until its collapse in 2024, it was ruled by the Assad family, and is therefore commonly referred to as the Assad regime. (Note: Sources: Kozak, Christopher (March 2017). "Iran's Assad Regime" (Document). Institute for the Study of War. p. 1.; Beijsens, Eline (2021). Strategy of Survival: The Resilience of the Assad Regime (Master's thesis). Prague: Charles University.; Masud, Muhammad (2018). "Authoritarian Claims to Legitimacy: Syria's Education under the Regime of Bashar al-Assad". Mediterranean Studies. 26 (1). JSTOR: 82–108. doi:10.5325/mediterraneanstu.26.1.0080. JSTOR 10.5325/mediterraneanstu.26.1.0080.; Khaddour, Kheder (July 2015). "The Assad Regime's Hold on the Syrian State" (Document). Carnegie Middle East Center.; Glioti, Andrea (6 August 2016). "Rojava: A libertarian myth under scrutiny". Al Jazeera. Archived from the original on 19 August 2016.; Hamdach, Widyane (7 May 2025). "Title: The Fall of Bashar al-Assad: Winners, Losers, and Challenges Ahead". gjia.georgetown.edu. Georgetown Journal of International Affairs.; Arraf, Jane (25 August 2025). "Syria may be warming up to Israel after fall of Assad regime". npr.org. NPR.; Bauer, Shane (18 August 2025). "Takeaways From the Times's Investigation Into Syria's Missing Children". The New York Times. Archived from the original on 25 August 2025.; "Syria to hold parliamentary elections in September, first since fall of Assad regime". PBS. 27 July 2025.; Radford, Antoinette (9 December 2024). "The Assad regime ruled Syria for 50 years. Here's how it fell in less than two weeks". CNN.) Ba'athist Syria was also, until its downfall, the only state member of the "Axis of Resistance" beside Iran.

The regime emerged in 1963 following a coup d'état led by Alawite Ba'athist military officers, which ended the era of democratic experimentation in the post-colonial Syrian Republic. Another coup in 1966 led to Salah Jadid becoming the country's de facto leader while Nureddin al-Atassi assumed the presidency. In 1970, Jadid and al-Atassi were overthrown by Hafez al-Assad in the Corrective Revolution. The next year, Assad became president after winning sham elections.

After assuming power, Assad reorganised the state along sectarian lines (Sunnis and other groups became figureheads of political institutions whilst Alawites took control of the military, intelligence, bureaucracy and security apparatuses). Ba'athist Syria also occupied much of neighboring Lebanon amidst the Lebanese civil war while an Islamist uprising against Assad's rule resulted in the regime committing the 1981 and 1982 Hama massacres. The regime was considered one of the most repressive in modern times, arguably reaching totalitarian levels, although it has been alternatively described as highly authoritarian but not totalitarian; it was consistently ranked as one of the 'worst of the worst' within Freedom House indexes.

Hafez al-Assad died in 2000 and was succeeded by his son Bashar al-Assad, who maintained a similar grip. The assassination of Lebanese Prime Minister Rafic Hariri in 2005 triggered the Cedar Revolution, which ultimately led the regime to withdraw from Lebanon. Major protests against Ba'athist rule in 2011 during the Arab Spring led to the Syrian civil war, with opposition forces and, in the following years, Islamist groups such as the Islamic State and Hay'at Tahrir al-Sham (HTS) further weakening the Assad regime's territorial control. However, the Ba'athist government maintained presence and a hold over large areas, also being able to regain further ground in later years with the support of Russia, Iran and Hezbollah. In late 2024, a series of surprise offensives led by HTS and various rebel factions culminated in the regime's collapse.

After the fall of Ba'athist Iraq, Syria was the only country governed by neo-Ba'athists. It had a comprehensive cult of personality around the Assad family, and attracted widespread condemnation for its severe domestic repression and war crimes. Until 2013, Syria possessed one of the largest arsenals of chemical weapons and the largest chemical weapons program in the Middle East. Prior to the fall of Assad, Syria was ranked fourth-worst in the 2024 Fragile States Index, and it was one of the most dangerous places in the world for journalists. Freedom of the press was extremely limited, and the country was ranked second-worst in the 2024 World Press Freedom Index. It was the most corrupt country in the MENA region and was ranked second-worst globally on the 2023 Corruption Perceptions Index. Syria was also the epicentre of an Assad-sponsored Captagon industry, exporting billions of dollars' worth of the illicit drug annually, making it one of the largest narco-states in the world.

== History ==
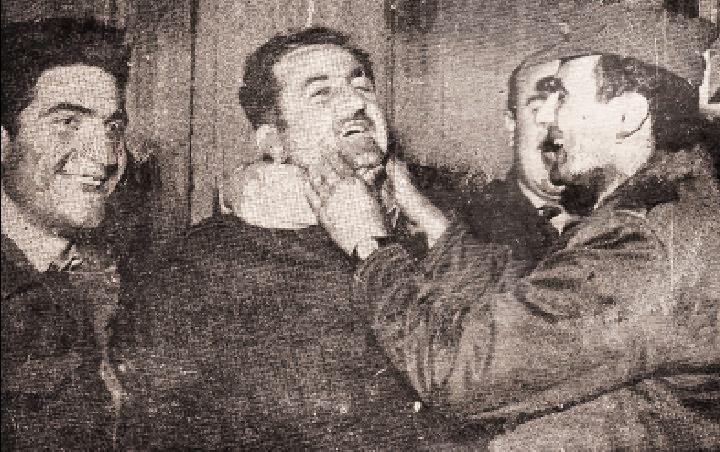
Neo-Ba'athist military officers celebrating the downfall of the Second Syrian Republic after seizing power from its last democratically elected president Nazim al-Qudsi in 1963.

=== 1963 coup ===
After the 1961 coup that terminated the political union between Egypt and Syria, the instability which followed eventually culminated in the 8 March 1963 Ba'athist coup. The takeover was engineered by members of the Arab Socialist Ba'ath Party, led by Michel Aflaq and Salah al-Din al-Bitar. The new Syrian cabinet was dominated by Ba'ath members. The 8 March coup ended the era of democratic experimentation in the post-colonial Syrian Republic.

After the 1963 seizure of power by its Military Committee, the Ba'ath party ruled Syria as a dictatorship which has been described as totalitarian. Ba'athists took control over country's politics, education, culture, religion and surveilled all aspects of civil society through its powerful Mukhabarat (secret police). After the purging of traditional civilian and military elites by the new regime, the Syrian Arab Armed forces and secret police were integrated with the Ba'ath party apparatus.

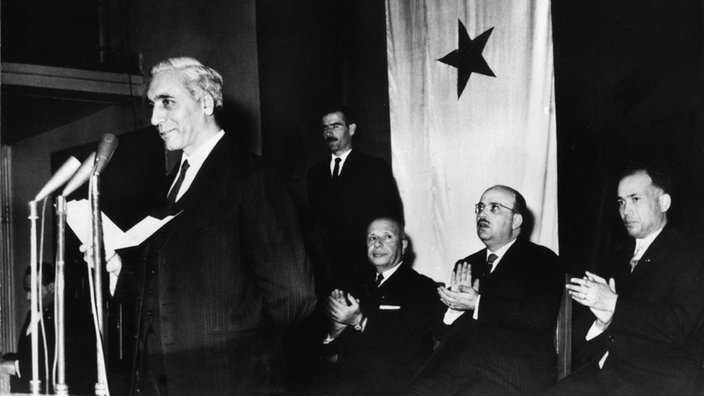
Amin al-Hafiz (left), an important political figure and president of Syria in 1963–66, carried out socialist reforms and reoriented the country towards the Soviet Union and the Eastern Bloc.

The 1963 Ba'athist coup marked a "radical break" in modern Syrian history, after which Ba'ath party monopolised power in the country to establish a one-party state and shaped a new socio-political order by enforcing its state ideology. Soon after seizing power, the neo-Ba'athist military officers began initiating purges across Syria as part of the imposition of their ideological programme. Politicians of the Second Syrian Republic who had supported the separation of Syria from United Arab Republic (UAR) were purged and liquidated by the Ba'athists. This was in addition to purging of the Syrian military and its subordination to the Ba'ath party. Politicians, military officers and civilians who supported Syria's secession from UAR were also stripped of their social and legal rights by the Ba'athist-controlled National Council for the Revolutionary Command (NCRC); thereby enabling the Ba'athist regime to dismantle the entire political class of the Second Syrian Republic and eliminate its institutions.

=== Neo-Ba'athist domination of Syrian Ba'ath Party: 1963–66 ===
Following the seizure of power in 1963 by the neo-Ba'athist military committee, the Syrian regional branch of the Ba'ath party experienced severe factionalism and splintering, leading to a succession of governments and new constitutions. The neo-Ba'athist military officers, through their increased political and military influence, began initiating purges across bureaucratic structures of the Syrian state and rapidly monopolized control over various organs of the Syrian Ba'ath party. Military Ba'athists also took control of the NCRC, which exercised the de-facto power in the new Ba'athist regime. Civilian wing of the Ba'ath party, consisting of classical Ba'athists led by Aflaq and Bitar, had little influence over the ideological direction of the Syrian regional branch. During the sixth national congress of the Ba'ath party, officers of the Ba'athist military committee, in collaboration with radical leftists, formally gained ideological and political control of the Syrian regional branch of the Ba'ath party. The ideological programme (known as Muntalaqat) and political platform adopted by the Syrian Ba'ath party during the 6th National Congress of the Ba'ath party in September 1963 became the official doctrine of the neo-Ba'ath and the state ideology of Ba'athist Syria. Subsequently, the Ba'athist regime began implementing its social, economic and political policies across Syria, which imposed the neo-Ba'athist agenda.

The far-left neo-Ba'athist tendency gained control of the Syrian regional branch at the Ba'ath party's 6th National Congress of 1963, where hardliners from the dominant Syrian and Iraqi regional parties joined forces to impose a radical leftist line, which advocated the imposition of "socialist planning", "collective farms run by peasants", "workers' democratic control of the means of production", a party based on workers and peasants, and other demands reflecting emulation of Soviet-style socialism. In a coded attack on Michel Aflaq, the congress also condemned "ideological notability", criticizing his middle-class background, within the party. Aflaq, angry at this transformation of his party, retained a nominal leadership role, but the National Command as a whole came under the control of the radicals.

The pro-Marxist resolutions and declarations, such as the espousal of class struggle and scientific socialism, adopted by the Ba'ath party during its 6th national congress set the ideological foundation of neo-Ba'athism. Between 1963 and 1966, neo-Ba'athists exercised the de-facto political power in Ba'athist Syria and were able to steer their ideological goals through the 1963 provisional Ba'athist constitution and its 1964 amendment. They also carried out purges within the Syrian Arab Armed Forces, as part of their efforts to subordinate the civilian old guard of the National Command of the Ba'ath Party and create an "ideological army" that was loyal to neo-Ba'athist officers. In foreign policy, neo-Ba'athists favoured the Socialist Bloc and were proponents of establishing a close alliance with the Soviet Union. The Maoist military concept of "people's war of liberation" played a central role in neo-Ba'athist ideology, and this was reflected in Ba'athist Syria's endorsement of socialist and left-wing Palestinian fedayeen groups in their guerrilla war against Israelis. In the economic sphere, neo-Ba'athists favoured the establishment of a socialist command economic system; and advocated the nationalization of private industries and radical land confiscation policies.

The first significant clash between the new Ba'athist regime and the outlawed Muslim Brotherhood took place in the city of Hama in April 1964. Insurgents affiliated with the Muslim Brotherhood set up roadblocks, stockpiled food and weapons, and attacked wine shops. The rebels used the local Sultan Mosque as a headquarter and sanctuary, where the imam Shaykh Mahmud al-Hamid encouraged the rebellion. Ismaili militiaman affiliated with the regime, Munzir al-Shimali, was killed and mutilated, while "every vestige" of the Ba'ath Party in Hama was attacked. The government responded by sending tanks and reinforcements to attack the rebels, forcing them to withdraw into the Sultan Mosque after fighting for two days. The mosque was subsequently bombarded and the uprising was suppressed. In 1965, Ba'athist regime passed so-called Revolution Protection Law, that prohibited any activity aimed at undermining the "Ba'athist Revolution."

=== 1966 coup ===
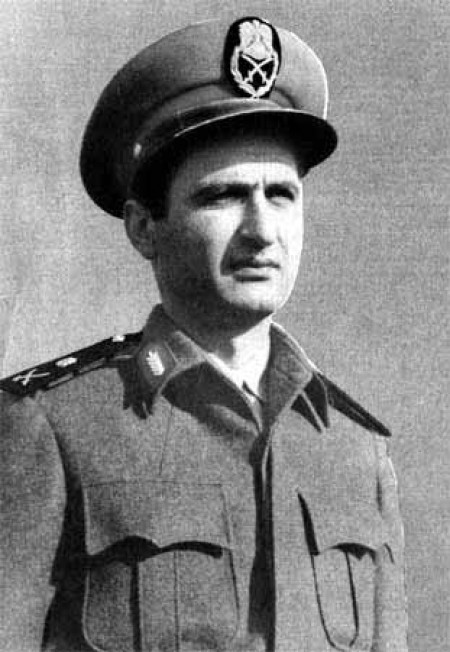
General Salah Jadid, a key figure in planning the 1966 coup. Though holding no formal position, he stayed in the shadows and was Syria’s de facto leader until 1970.

On 23 February 1966, the neo-Ba'athist Military Committee carried out an intra-party rebellion against the Ba'athist Old Guard (Aflaq and Bitar), imprisoned President Amin al-Hafiz and designated a regionalist, civilian Ba'ath government on 1 March. Although Nureddin al-Atassi became the formal head of state, Salah Jadid was Syria's effective ruler from 1966 until November 1970, when he was deposed by Hafez al-Assad, who at the time was Minister of Defense.

1966 coup marked the total ideological transformation of the Ba'ath party's Syrian regional branch into a militarist "neo-Ba'athist" organization which became independent of the National Command of the original Ba'ath party. The regime that came to power in 1966 was the most radical in Syrian history. Jadid's rule was characterized by an even more radical socialist transformation of the entire state, an aggressive imposition of military Leninism and brutal repression by the Mukhabarat secret services inside the country. Jadid actively promoted the concept of the "Arab Socialist New Man". Outside the country, Jadid's Syria aligned itself with the Soviet bloc and pursued hardline policies towards Israel and "reactionary" Arab states (especially Saudi Arabia). Jadid promoted the Maoist concept of a People's war against the Zionists, supporting the Palestinian fedayeen, giving them greater autonomy and allowing them to launch attacks on Israel from Syrian territory. The coup led to the schism within the original pan-Arab Ba'ath Party: one Iraqi-led ba'ath movement (ruled Iraq from 1968 to 2003) and one Syrian-led ba'ath movement was established. In the first half of 1967, a low-key state of war existed between Syria and Israel. Conflict over Israeli cultivation of land in the Demilitarized Zone led to 7 April pre-war aerial clashes between Israel and Syria. When the Six-Day War broke out between Egypt and Israel, Syria joined the war and attacked Israel as well. In the final days of the war, Israel turned its attention to Syria, capturing two-thirds of the Golan Heights in under 48 hours. The defeat caused a split between Jadid and Assad over what steps to take next. Disagreement developed between Jadid, who controlled the party apparatus, and Assad, who controlled the military. The 1970 retreat of Syrian forces sent to aid the Palestine Liberation Organization (PLO) led by Yasser Arafat during the Black September (also known as the Jordan Civil War of 1970) hostilities with Jordan reflected this disagreement.

On 20 September 1970, Syria under president Nureddin al-Atassi and strongman Salah Jadid invaded Jordan in support of Palestinian fedayeen forces of the Palestine Liberation Organization, as part of Black September. Syria committed 16,000 troops and more than 170 T-55 tanks to invade Jordan. By 22 September, however, the Syrian invasion attempt had been largely defeated. As Syrian forces attempted to advance toward Irbid, approximately 50 of 200 Syrian tanks became inoperable. Syrian forces withdrew from Jordan on 23 September after sustaining losses of 62 tanks, 58 other armoured vehicles and 1,500 casualties, mainly due to the actions of Jordanian Air Forces (Syrian Air Forces did not take part in the battles). Jordan lost around 75–90 tanks, an armored car, and had around 112 casualties.

=== Under the Assad family (1970–2024) ===
==== Hafez al-Assad (1970–2000) ====
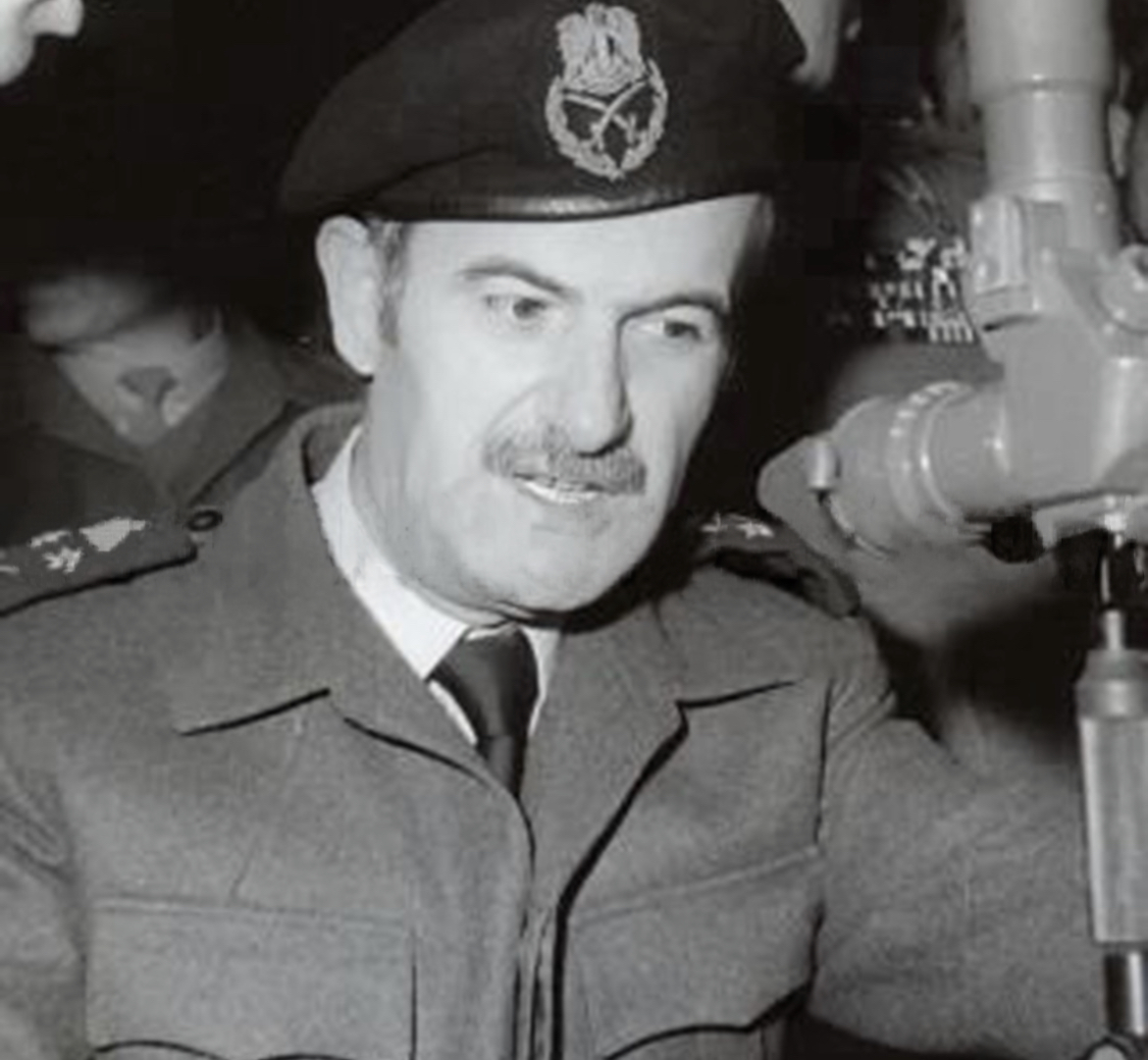
Hafez al-Assad, president of Syria from 1971 until his death in 2000, built a strong military dictatorship.

The power struggle culminated in the November 1970 Syrian Corrective Revolution, a bloodless military coup that removed Jadid and installed Hafez al-Assad as the strongman of the government. General Hafez al-Assad became prime minister, and was elected president in March 1971. He launched series of huge reforms and transformed a neo-Ba'athist party state into a dictatorship frequently described as totalitarian, marked by his pervasive grip on the party, armed forces, secret police, media, education sector, religious and cultural spheres, urban planning, economic activity, and all aspects of civil society. Alternatively, however, it has been argued that this system was merely authoritarian, since, despite the monopolization of politics and high levels of political repression, this dictatorship did not seek to transform the society in accordance with the image of a "new man" (set by the Western theories of totalitarianism as an important attribute) and total control of the behaviour of the populace which generally had to abstain from politics instead. Embedding a system based on sectarian patronage, Hafez assigned Alawite loyalists to key posts in the military forces, bureaucracy, intelligence and the ruling elite; establishing an Alawite minority rule to consolidate power within his family. The cult of personality became a core tenet of Assadist ideology, which espoused that Assad dynasty was destined to rule perennially.

When Hafez al-Assad came to power, the army began to modernize and change. In the first 10 years of Assad's rule, the army increased by 162%, and by 264% by 2000. At one point, 70% of the country's budget went only to the army. On 6 October 1973, Syria and Egypt initiated the Yom Kippur War against Israel. The Israel Defense Forces reversed the initial Syrian gains and pushed deeper into Syrian territory. The village of Quneitra was largely destroyed by the Israeli army. After this, a war of attrition began, which lasted until the end of May 1974. In the late 1970s, an Islamist uprising by the Muslim Brotherhood was aimed against the government. Islamists attacked civilians and off-duty military personnel, leading security forces to also kill civilians in retaliatory strikes. The uprising had reached its climax in the 1982 Hama massacre, when more than 40,000 people were killed by Syrian military troops and Ba'athist paramilitaries. It has been described as the "single deadliest act" of violence perpetrated by any state upon its own population in modern Arab history. After the uprising the government resumed its version of militaristic Leninism, repealing liberalization introduced when Assad came to power. In 1980, the Assad government passed Law No. 49, that prohibited any activity of the Muslim Brotherhood in Syria.

From 1973 to 1976, the Assad regime carried out Arab Belt project – an Arabization campaign in the eastern Syrian province of al-Hasakah to the detriment of local ethnic groups such as the Kurds, forcibly deporting the local population and settling Arab families there. While the proposals in the Hilal report had officially been accepted by the Ba'athist government as early as 1965, it was Hafez who ordered the implementation of the Arab Belt programme in 1973. The project's name was changed by the Assad government to "Plan to establish model state farms in the Jazira region". As a result of the campaign, tens of thousands of Kurds were deported from Syria without the possibility of returning and replaced by Arab families, mostly from the neighboring Raqqa Governorate, and the Kurdish village names of the area were replaced by Arabic names not necessarily related to the traditions and history of the region.

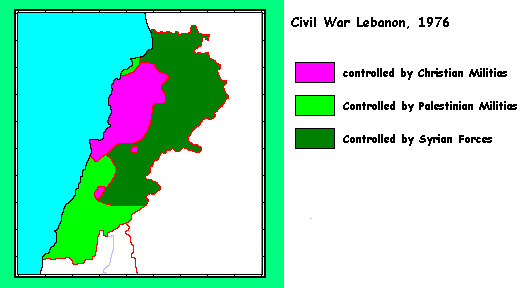
Syria invaded Lebanon on 31 May 1976, and would occupy parts of the country until 2005.

Syria was invited into Lebanon by its president, Suleiman Frangieh, in 1976, to intervene on the side of the Lebanese government against Palestine Liberation Organization guerilla fighters and Lebanese Maronite forces amid the Lebanese Civil War. The Arab Deterrent Force originally consisted of a Syrian core, up to 25,000 troops, with participation by some other Arab League states totaling only around 5,000 troops. In late 1978, after the Arab League had extended the mandate of the Arab Deterrent Force, the Sudanese, the Saudis and the United Arab Emirates announced intentions to withdraw troops from Lebanon, extending their stay into the early months of 1979 at the Lebanese government's request. The Libyan troops were essentially abandoned and had to find their own way home, and the ADF thereby became a purely Syrian force, although it did include the Palestine Liberation Army. A year after Israel invaded and occupied Southern Lebanon during the 1982 Lebanon War, the Lebanese government failed to extend the ADF's mandate, thereby effectively ending its existence, although not the Syrian or Israeli military presence in Lebanon. Eventually the Syrian presence became known as the Syrian occupation of Lebanon.

Syrian forces lingered in Lebanon throughout the civil war in Lebanon, eventually bringing most of the nation under Syrian control as part of a power struggle with Israel, which had occupied areas of southern Lebanon in 1978. In 1985, Israel began to withdraw from Lebanon, as a result of domestic opposition in Israel and international pressure. In the aftermath of this withdrawal, the War of the Camps broke out, with Syria fighting their former Palestinian allies. The Syrian occupation of Lebanon continued until 2005.

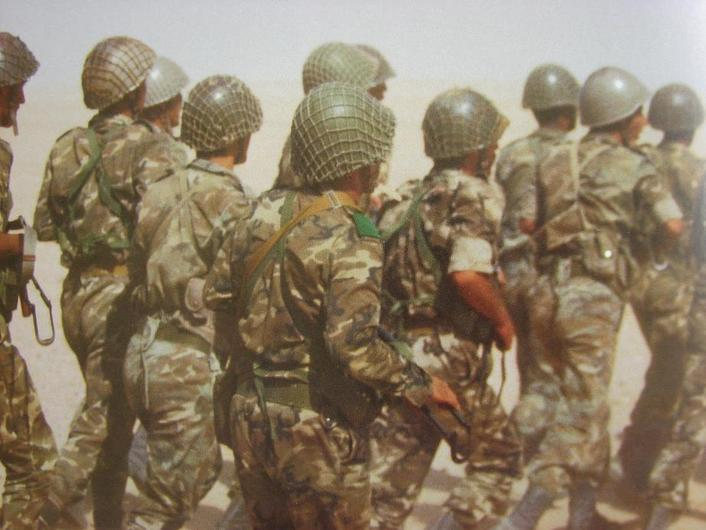
Syrian soldiers during the Gulf war, 1991

In 1984, Syria, with Hafez's health deteriorating, faced an coup attempt by the president's brother, Rifaat al-Assad. The capital Damascus was on the brink of civil war and a strong concentration of troops, soldiers, tanks and artillery, divided between the army and Rifaat's Defense Brigades. However, war was avoided: the coup failed and Rifaat was forced to flee, while his Defense Brigades were disbanded.

In a major shift in relations with both other Arab states and the Western world, Syria participated in the United States-led Gulf War against Saddam Hussein. The country participated in the multilateral Madrid Conference of 1991, and during the 1990s engaged in negotiations with Israel along with Palestine and Jordan. These negotiations failed, and there have been no further direct Syrian-Israeli talks since President Hafez al-Assad's meeting with then President Bill Clinton in Geneva in 2000.

==== Bashar al-Assad before the revolution (2000–2011) ====
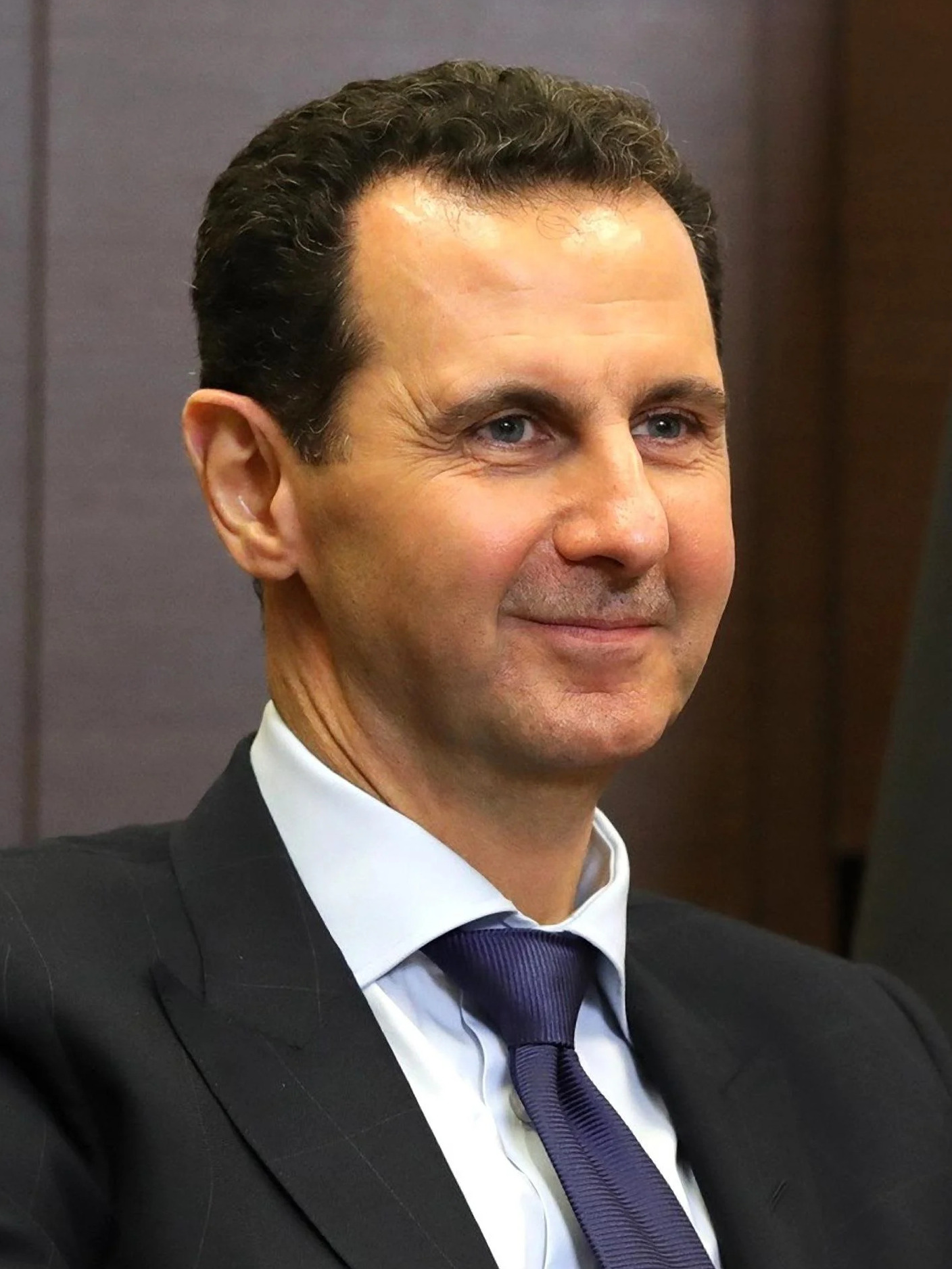
Bashar al-Assad, president of Ba'athist Syria (2000–2024)

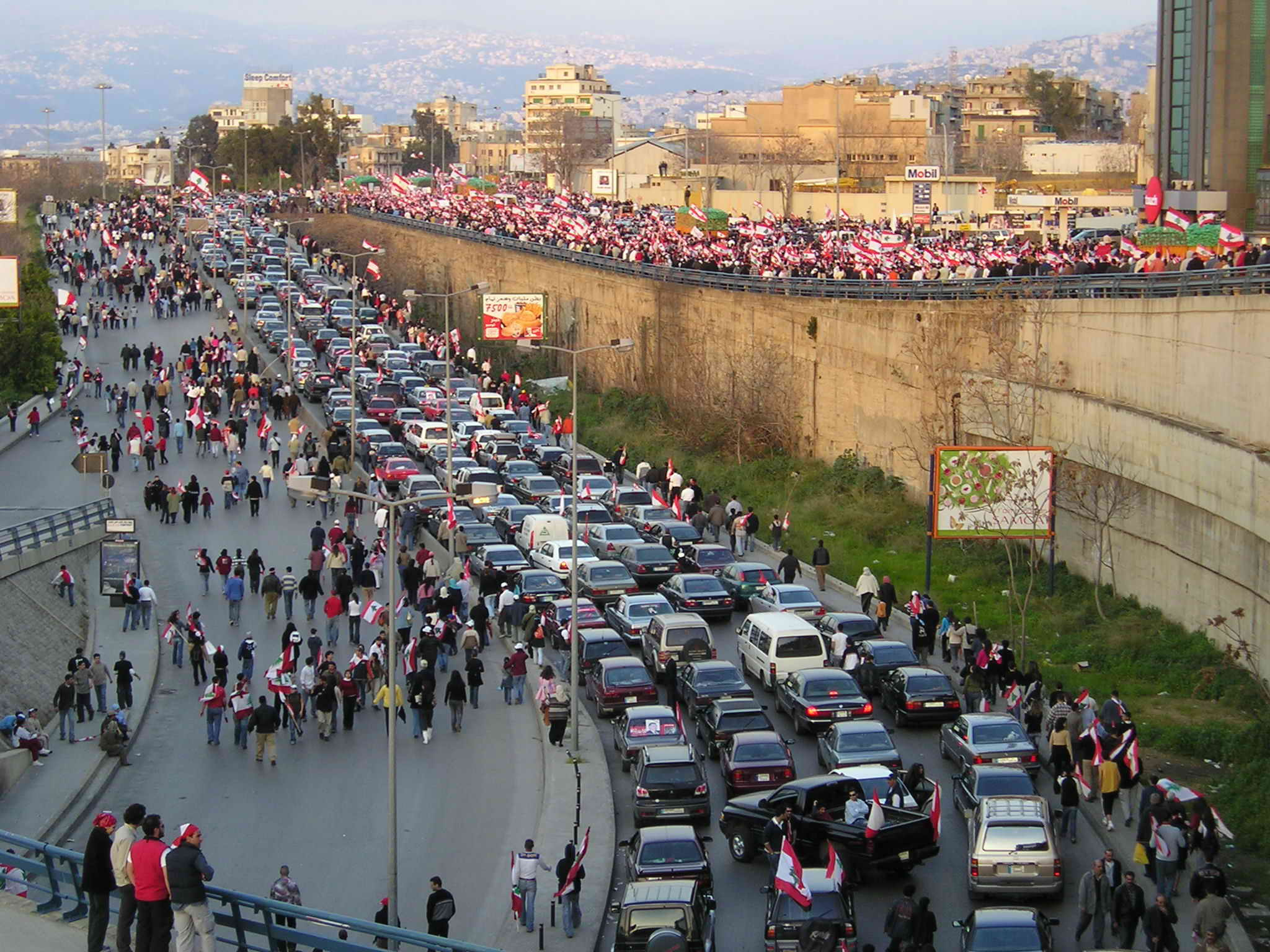
Cedar Revolution demonstrators in Lebanon, marching against Assad regime's military occupation in Lebanon after the killing of Rafic Hariri

Hafez al-Assad died on 10 June 2000. His son, Bashar al-Assad, was elected president in an election in which he ran unopposed. His election saw the birth of the Damascus Spring and hopes of reform, but by autumn 2001, the authorities had suppressed the movement, imprisoning some of its leading intellectuals. Instead, reforms were limited to some market reforms. On 5 October 2003, Israel bombed a site near Damascus, claiming it was a terrorist training facility for members of Islamic Jihad. In March 2004, Syrian Kurds and Arabs clashed in the northeastern city of al-Qamishli. Signs of rioting were seen in the cities of Qamishli and Hasakeh. In 2005, the assassination of former Lebanese prime minister Rafic Hariri led to international condemnation and triggered a popular Intifada in Lebanon, known as "the Cedar Revolution", which forced Syria to withdraw its 20,000 soldiers in Lebanon and end its 29-year-long military occupation of Lebanon. On 6 September 2007, foreign jet fighters, suspected as Israeli, reportedly carried out Operation Orchard against a suspected nuclear reactor under construction by North Korean technicians.

==== Revolution and civil war (2011–2020) ====
Hundreds of thousands of Syrian protesters gather in Hama on 22 July 2011 during the outbreak of Syrian Revolution, chanting the rallying slogan of the Arab Spring: "Ash-shaʻb yurīd isqāṭ an-niẓām" (Arabic: الشعب يريد إسقاط النظام, lit. 'The people want to bring down the regime!')

Military situation in March 2013

The Syrian revolution began in 2011 as a part of the wider Arab Spring, a wave of upheaval throughout the Arab World. Public demonstrations across Syria began on 26 January 2011 and developed into a nationwide uprising. Protesters demanded the resignation of President Bashar al-Assad, the overthrow of his government, and an end to nearly five decades of Ba'ath Party rule. Since spring 2011, the Syrian government deployed the Syrian Army to quell the uprising, and several cities were besieged, though the unrest continued. According to some witnesses, soldiers, who refused to open fire on civilians, were summarily executed by the Syrian Army. The Syrian government denied reports of defections, and blamed armed gangs for causing trouble. Since early autumn 2011, civilians and army defectors began forming fighting units, which began an insurgency campaign against the Syrian Army. The insurgents unified under the banner of the Free Syrian Army and fought in an increasingly organized fashion; however, the civilian component of the armed opposition lacked an organized leadership.

The uprising has sectarian undertones, though neither faction in the conflict described sectarianism as playing a major role. The opposition was dominated by Sunni Muslims, whereas the leading government figures were Alawites, affiliated with Shia Islam. As a result, the opposition was supported by Sunni Muslim states, whereas the government was publicly supported by the Shia-dominated Iran and the Lebanese Hezbollah. According to various sources, including the United Nations, up to 13,470–19,220 people were killed, of which about half were civilians, but also including 6,035–6,570 armed combatants from both sides and up to 1,400 opposition protesters. Many more were injured, and tens of thousands of protesters were imprisoned. According to the government, between March 2011 and May 2012, 9,815–10,146 people, including 3,430 members of the security forces, 2,805–3,140 insurgents and up to 3,600 civilians, were killed in fighting with what they characterized as "armed terrorist groups." To escape the violence, tens of thousands of Syrian refugees fled the country to neighboring Jordan, Iraq and Lebanon, as well to Turkey. The total official UN numbers of Syrian refugees reached 42,000 at the time, while unofficial estimates stood at as many as 130,000.

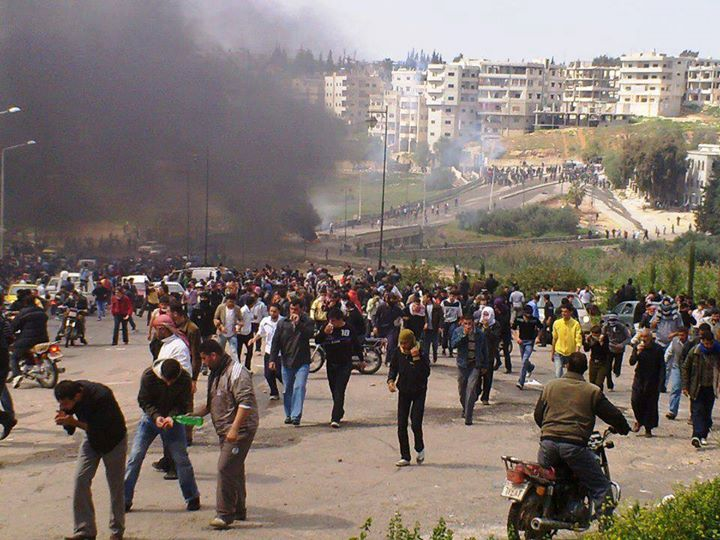
An anti-Assad protest in Daraa, 2013.

UNICEF reported that over 500 children were killed in the 11 months up to February 2012. Another 400 children were reportedly arrested and tortured in Syrian prisons. Additionally, over 600 detainees and political prisoners died under torture. Human Rights Watch (HRW) accused the government and Shabiha, an armed militia supporting the government, of using civilians as human shields when they advanced on opposition held-areas. Anti-government rebels were also accused of human rights abuses, including torture, kidnapping, unlawful detention and execution of civilians, Shabiha and soldiers. HRW also expressed concern at the kidnapping of Iranian nationals. The UN Commission of Inquiry documented abuses of this nature in its February 2012 report, which also included documentation indicating rebel forces were responsible for the displacement of civilians.

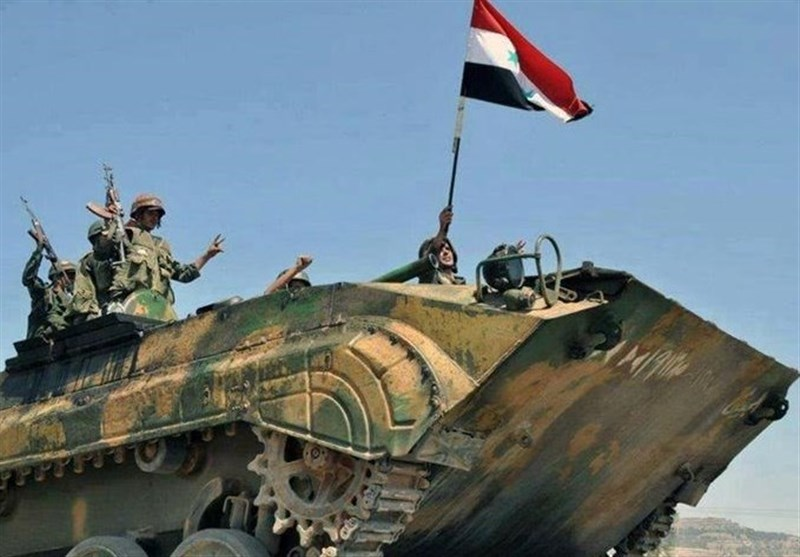
Syrian government forces kept control of more than half of Syrian territory.

The Arab League, the United States, the European Union states, the Gulf Cooperation Council states, and several countries across the world condemned the Assad regime's perpetration of violence against the protesters. China and Russia avoided condemning the regime or applying sanctions, asserting that such methods could escalate into foreign intervention. On the other hand, military intervention was ruled out by most countries that condemned the Assad regime. The Arab League suspended Syria's membership over the government's response to the crisis, but sent an observer mission in December 2011, as part of its proposal for a peaceful resolution of the crisis. The Arab League and United Nations made attempts to resolve the Syrian crisis and appointed Kofi Annan as their special envoy to Syria. On 16 March, Annan submitted a six-point peace plan to the UN Security Council. On 24 March 2012, Annan flew to Moscow in an effort to secure Russian support for his plan.

The civil war resulted in more than 600,000 deaths, with pro-Assad forces causing more than 90% of the total civilian casualties. (Note: Sources:) The war led to a massive refugee crisis, with an estimated 7.6 million internally displaced people (July 2015 UNHCR figure) and over 5 million refugees (July 2017 registered by UNHCR). The war has also worsened economic conditions, with more than 90% of the population living in poverty and 80% facing food insecurity.

==== Stalemate (2020–2024) ====
Military situation prior to the Syrian opposition offensives in late 2024

From 2020, the conflict settled into a stalemate. Although roughly 30% of the country was controlled by opposition forces, heavy fighting had largely ceased and there was a growing regional trend toward normalizing relations with the regime of Bashar al-Assad. On 7 May 2023, at the meeting of the Council of the Arab League composed of foreign ministers in Cairo, was agreed to reinstate Syria's membership. Following a year of normalization attempts, Turkish President Recep Tayyip Erdoğan expressed his readiness in July 2023 to meet with Assad, but rejected the withdrawal of Turkish forces from northern Syria as a precondition. Assad, however, insisted that any meeting could not take place on Turkish terms and continued to demand the complete withdrawal of Turkish forces from Syria.

During this period, the government rejected major incentives for the reconciliation and repatriation of former rebel groups. Bashar al-Assad was encouraged by his allies, including members of the Axis of Resistance, to pursue such measures, but he did not follow through on these suggestions, leaving Syrian society deeply polarized. Planning by Syrian opposition forces for a military offensive against Aleppo began in late 2023 but was delayed by Turkish objections. Erdoğan sought negotiations with the Assad government, to "determine Syria's future together," but received a negative response, following which he allowed the HTS-led opposition troops to begin their offensive against the Assad government.

During this period, Ba'athist Syria continued to be one of the most dangerous places for journalists, and was ranked 8th last on the 2024 Global Peace Index and 4th worst in the 2024 Fragile States Index. Freedom of press remained non-existent, and the Assad regime was ranked 2nd worst in the 2024 World Press Freedom Index. Ranked second to last globally on the 2023 Corruption Perceptions Index, Assad's regime was also the most corrupt in the Middle East. Ba'athist Syria also became the epicentre of a state-sponsored illicit drug cartel, the largest in the world, which incorporated a multi-billion dollar captagon industry.

=== Collapse of the Assad regime (2024) ===
Military situation after the fall of the Assad regime in December 2024. Territories controlled by the Hay'at Tahrir al-Sham (white), SOR (pink), SNA and Turkey (light green), Syrian Democratic Forces (yellow), IS (grey stripes), the SFA and the United States (teal), and unclear control (grey/red).

On 27 November 2024, violence flared up once again. Rebel factions, led by the Islamist group Hayat Tahrir al-Sham (HTS) and the Turkish-backed Syrian National Army (SNA), had taken control of Aleppo, prompting a retaliatory airstrike campaign by Syrian President Bashar al-Assad, supported by Russia. The strikes, which targeted population centers and several hospitals in rebel-held city of Idlib, resulted in at least 25 deaths, according to the White Helmets rescue group. The NATO countries issued a joint statement calling for the protection of civilians and critical infrastructure to prevent further displacement and ensure humanitarian access. They stressed the urgent need for a Syrian-led political solution, in accordance with UN Security Council Resolution 2254, which advocates for dialogue between the Syrian government and opposition forces. The rebel offensive, which had begun on 27 November 2024, continued its advance into Hama Province following their capture of Aleppo.

On 29 November, rebels affiliated to the Southern Front abandoned their reconciliation efforts with the Syrian government and launched an offensive in the South, in the hope of implementing a pincer movement against Damascus.

On 4 December 2024, fierce clashes erupted in Hama province as the Syrian army engaged Islamist-led insurgents in a bid to halt their advance on the key city of Hama. Government forces claimed to have launched a counteroffensive with air support, pushing back rebel factions, including Hayat Tahrir al-Sham (HTS), around six miles from the city. However, despite reinforcements, the rebels captured the city on 5 December. The fighting led to widespread displacement, with nearly 50,000 people fleeing the area and over 600 casualties reported, including 104 civilians.

On 6 December, in a face-to-face interview with CNN, Abu Mohammad al-Julani declared that the offensive's goal was to remove Assad from power. Using his birth name, Ahmed al-Sharaa, he explicitly pledged to protect minority groups and outlined plans for establishing a government grounded in institutions and a "council chosen by the people". He also expressed his intention to facilitate the return of Syrian refugees to their homes.

In the evening of 6 December 2024, Southern Front forces captured the regional capital of Suwayda, in southern Syria, following the pro-government forces' withdrawal from the city. Concurrently, the Kurdish-led Syrian Democratic Forces captured the provincial capital of Deir ez-Zor from pro-government forces, which also left the town of Palmyra in central Homs Governorate. By midnight, opposition forces in the southern Daraa Governorate captured its capital Daraa, as well as 90% of the province, as pro-government forces withdrew towards the capital Damascus. Meanwhile, the Syrian Free Army (SFA), a different rebel group backed by the United States took control of Palmyra in an offensive launched from the al-Tanf "deconfliction zone".

On 7 December 2024, pro-government forces withdrew from the Quneitra Governorate, which borders the Israeli-occupied Golan Heights. That day, the Israeli army helped the UNDOF repel an attack. The Southern Front entered the suburbs of Damascus, which was simultaneously attacked from the north by the Syrian Free Army. As the rebels advanced, Assad fled Damascus to Moscow, where he was granted political asylum by Russian president Vladimir Putin. The next day, the Syrian opposition forces captured the cities of Homs and Damascus. After Damascus fell, Ba'athist Syria collapsed, and Prime Minister Mohammad Ghazi al-Jalali stayed in a caretaker capacity with the rebels' permission until they established the Syrian caretaker government two days later.

Holdouts loyal to Assad started an insurgency in western Syria in late December 2024. In March 2025, the Constitutional Declaration criminalized public support for the former Assad regime. The new Syrian government has prosecuted many former officials and individuals affiliated with the regime. According to political analyst Kamal Abdo, these fugitives number at up to 10,000 as of July 2026.

== Politics and government ==
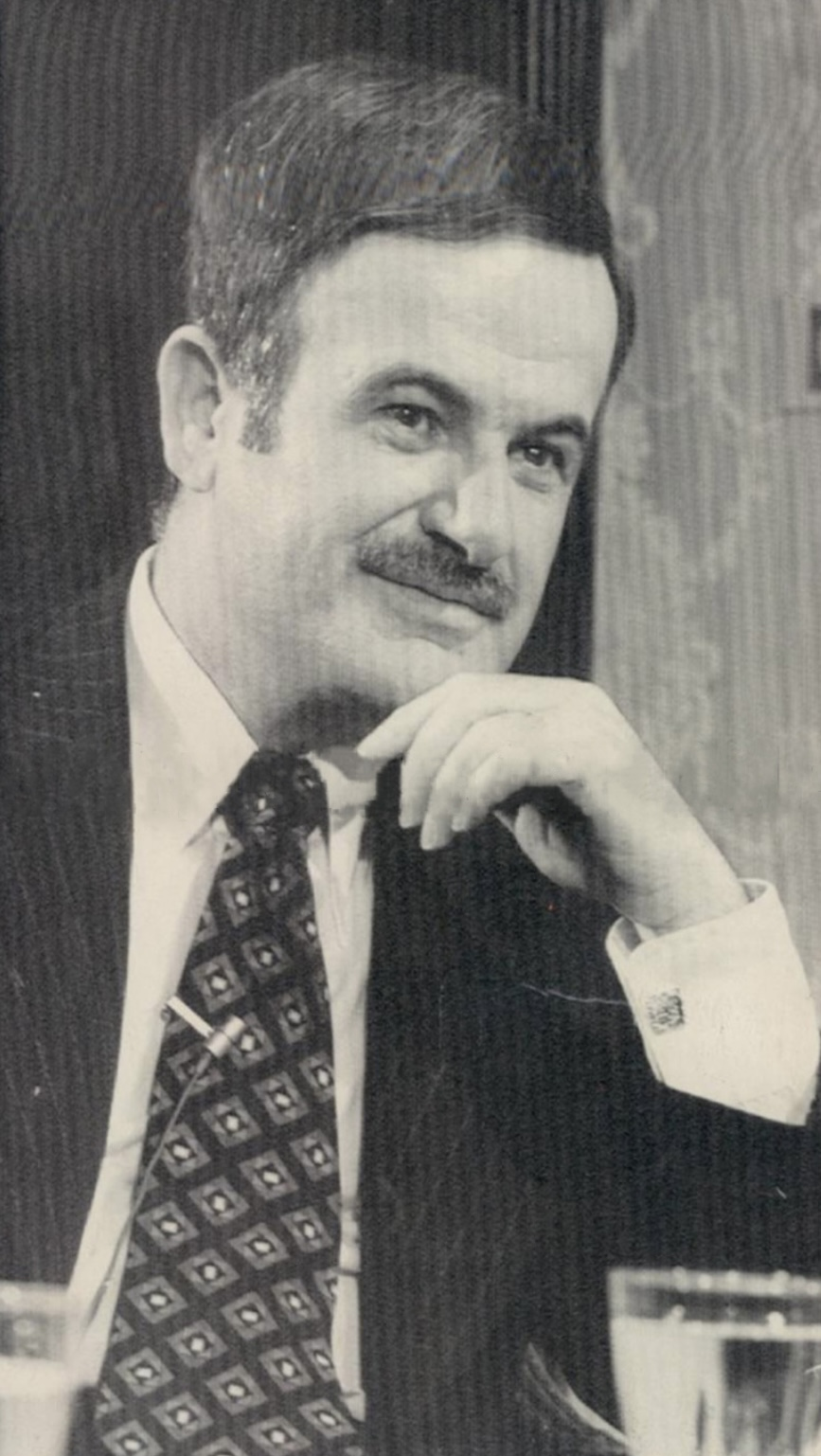
Hafez al-Assad in 1974

Since the 1963 seizure of power by its neo-Ba'athist Military Committee until the fall of the Assad regime in 2024, the Arab Socialist Ba'ath Party governed Syria as a one-party dictatorship that operated as a totalitarian police state. Following a period of intra-party strife, Ba'athist general Hafez al-Assad purged his political rivals and then gained control of the Syrian Ba'ath party after the 1970 coup d'état; since then, his family dominated the country's politics until the collapse of the Ba'athist system.

The regime was considered one of the most repressive in modern times, arguably reaching totalitarian levels, although it has been alternatively described as highly authoritarian but not totalitarian; it was consistently ranked as one of the "worst of the worst" within Freedom House indexes.

Julie Rajan noted that Bashar al-Assad's brutal crackdowns on dissidents and peaceful protestors was modelled after the pattern of Hafez al-Assad's totalitarianism, which was marked by the pervasive regimentation of civilians through the Ba'athist military and judicial apparatus. Through the emergency laws imposed on Syrians by the Ba'ath party since 1963, both Hafez and Bashar exercised dictatorial powers and centralized administrative functioning around the Assad family and their small clique of loyalists. The Ba'athist emergency laws enabled Hafez and Bashar to order arbitrary detentions, interfere in the personal lives of civilians, operate extrajudicial structures, and declare punishments against suspected dissidents through shadow courts. The number of personnel in the Syrian military and various intelligence entities expanded drastically from 65,000 in 1965 to 530,000 in 1991; and surpassed 700,000 in 2004.

To further consolidate his grip on power, Hafez abolished the Ba'athist provisional constitution of 1969 and imposed the 1973 constitution of Ba'athist Syria, which established a fervently personalist autocracy. The document emphasized rigid centralization of power around the Syrian presidency, giving Hafez constitutional powers to appoint cabinet members and arbitrarily convene or dismiss the legislative assembly. The constitution further stipulated that all members of the Supreme Constitutional Court of Ba'athist Syria were to be directly appointed by the Syrian president, thereby enabling Hafez to exercise de facto control over the Ba'athist judicial apparatus and electoral process. The provisions of Hafez al-Assad's 1973 constitution also entrenched the power of the Arab Socialist Ba'ath Party, with its 8th article describing the party as "the leading party in the society and the state", effectively defining Ba'athist Syria as a one-party socialist state governed under emergency laws.

After Ba'athist Syria's adoption of a new constitution in 2012, its political system operated in the framework of a presidential state that nominally permitted the candidacy of individuals who were not part of the Ba'athist-controlled National Progressive Front founded in 1972. In practice, Ba'athist Syria remained a one-party state, which banned any independent or opposition political activity.

Ba'athist Syria was also a unitary state with centralisation in the national government.

=== Judiciary ===
There was no independent judiciary in the Syrian Arab Republic, since all judges and prosecutors were required to be Ba'athist appointees. Syria's judicial branches included the Supreme Constitutional Court, the High Judicial Council, the Court of Cassation, and the State Security Courts. The Supreme State Security Court (SSSC) was abolished by President Bashar al-Assad by legislative decree No. 53 on 21 April 2011. Syria had three levels of courts: courts of first instance, courts of appeals, and the constitutional court, the highest tribunal. Religious courts handled questions of personal and family law.

Article 3(2) of the 1973 constitution declared Islamic jurisprudence a main source of legislation. The judicial system had elements of Ottoman, French, and Islamic laws. The Personal Status Law 59 of 1953 (amended by Law 34 of 1975) was essentially a codified sharia; the Code of Personal Status was applied to Muslims by sharia courts.

=== Elections ===
Elections were conducted through a sham process; characterised by wide-scale rigging, repetitive voting and absence of voter registration and verification systems. Parliamentary elections were held on 13 April 2016 in the government-controlled areas of Syria, for all 250 seats of Syria's unicameral legislature, the Majlis al-Sha'ab, or the People's Council of Syria. Even before results had been announced, several nations, including Germany, the United States and the United Kingdom, declared their refusal to accept the results, largely citing it "not representing the will of the Syrian people." However, representatives of the Russian Federation have voiced their support of this election's results. Various independent observers and international organizations denounced the Assad regime's electoral conduct as a scam; with the United Nations condemning it as illegitimate elections with "no mandate". Electoral Integrity Project's 2022 Global report designated Syrian elections as a "facade" with the worst electoral integrity in the world alongside Comoros and Central African Republic.

=== State ideology ===
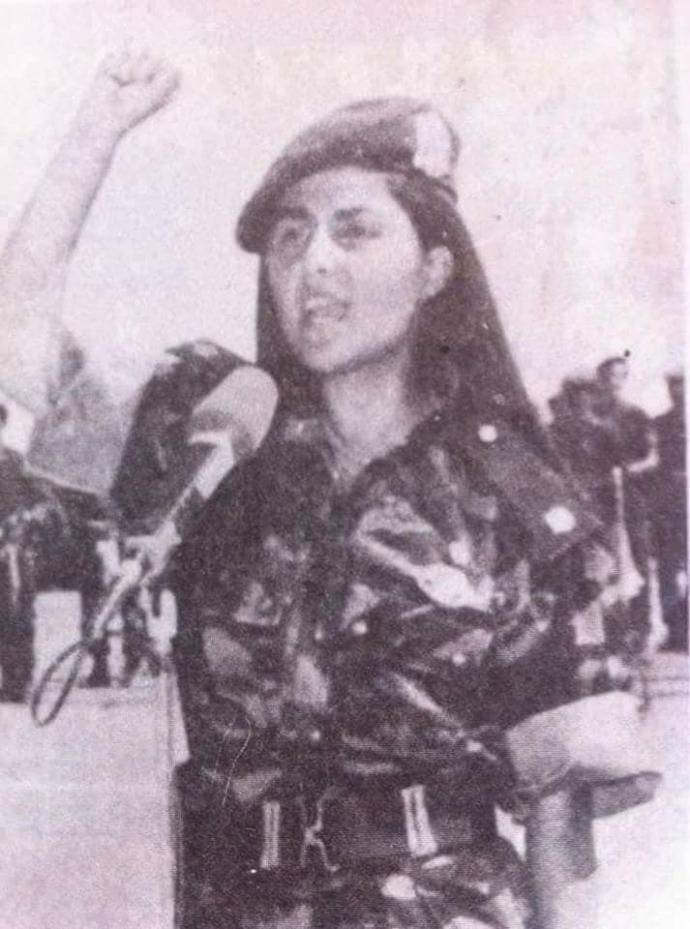
Female paratrooper performance during a military ceremony

Syria's state ideology under the Ba'ath Party was Neo-Ba'athism, a distinct and far-left variant of Ba'athism that became the official ideology of the Syrian regional branch of the Ba'ath party after its 6th National Congress in September 1963. The neo-Ba'athist radicals, who dominated the regional structures of the Syrian branch of the Ba'ath party, initiated a power struggle against the party's old guard, culminating in the 1966 neo-Ba'athist coup. The coup resulted in the structural separation of the Ba'ath party's Syrian regional branch from its National Command, and transformed Syrian Ba'ath Party into a militarist organization. The coup and the subsequent neo-Ba'athist purges against Aflaqists triggered the deepest schism in the Ba'ath movement's history, which resulted in the splintering of the movement into Iraqi-dominated and Syrian-dominated factions, and the ensuing conflict between them.

Neo-Ba'athism has been described as a divergence from Ba'athism proper that had gone beyond its pan-Arabist ideological basis by espousing Marxism and purging the classical Ba'athist leadership of the old guard, including Michel Aflaq and Salah al-Din al-Bitar. As a result of these ideological differences, the Syrian Ba'ath Party came into conflict with Arab nationalists such as Nasserists and the Iraqi Ba'athists, particularly Saddamists, with whom they maintained a bitter rivalry. Neo-Ba'athism has been criticized by the founder of Ba'athist ideology, Michel Aflaq, for diverging from the original principles of Ba'athism. Since 1971 (after Hafez al-Assad came to power), neo-Ba'athism has transformed into Assadism, with even greater nationalism, militarism and the Assad family's cult of personality. State propaganda portrayed Assadism as a neo-Ba'athist current that evolved Ba'athist ideology with the needs of the modern era.

=== State propaganda in mass media and schools ===
Ba'athist Syria had a broad, highly militaristic and anti-Israeli propaganda. The entire neo-Baathist ideology ultimately revolved around "resisting the Israeli threat" and creating a powerful army and a militarized society (along with Arab and Syrian nationalism and building socialism). These ideas were constantly disseminated to society through the media, and in schools through the education system: in Ba'athist Syria, there were virtually no independent media or similar educational systems (both were completely controlled by the regime). In addition to glorifying Ba'athist ideas, state propaganda glorified the Assad family and participated in the personality cult of Hafez (and, since 2000, Bashar) Assad: for example, Syrian officials were made to refer to him as 'the sanctified one' (al-Muqaddas). Independent journalists in Syria were under strict control and surveillance by the regime, including being forced to censor themselves for fear of being thrown into prison.

School students were taught Ba'athism through a course known as "Political Arab Sociology". Teachers began each lesson with the song "Our eternal leader, Hafez al-Assad". There was also a youth organization in schools called the "Revolutionary Youth Union" (RYU), created in 1968. It is a governmental, neo-Ba'athist, nationalist and anti-Zionist organization that is dedicated to "educating young people in middle and high schools about the ideology of the Ba'ath Party" and preparing them to join its ranks (In other words, is engaged in propaganda of the "correct values of the Ba'ath Party" that every Syrian should follow). The union's legislation provided for "educating the country's young generation, developing their energy, organizing them for collective work, training and qualifying them, and preparing the youth to "contribute to the defense of the revolution led by the party." Membership in the organization usually begins in the tenth year of school and is a path to active membership in the Ba'ath Party after at least three years of ideological (and some military) training. The RYU also publishes the newspaper Al-Masirah. Primary school students was headed by "Al-Ba'ath Vanguard" (created in 1974), and college students was headed by "National Union of Syrian Students" (created in 1963). Periodically, military marches were held in Ba'athist Syria with the participation of students in military uniform, with banners or portraits of Hafez al-Assad. In addition to the educational system and the media, the regime has taken control of the country's political and religious spheres.

=== Administrative divisions ===
Ba'athist Syria was divided into 14 governorates, which were subdivided into 61 districts, which in turn further divided into sub-districts. After assuming power in 1963, there were 12 governorates in the country with Rashid Governorate was renamed to Raqqa Governorate that same year. It was increased to 14 with Quneitra Governorate was split from Damascus Governorate in 1964 and Tartus Governorate detached from Latakia Governorate in 1972.

In 1972, the Damascus City Governorate is split from Damascus Governorate. In 1986, the first became Damascus Governorate while the second became Rif Dimashq Governorate.

Most of Quneitra Governorate is situated on a high plateau, namely the Golan Heights. It was occupied by Israel during the Six-Day War in 1967 and has since remained under Israeli occupation.

Governorates of Syria

No.	Governorate	Capital
1	Latakia Governorate	Latakia
2	Idlib Governorate	Idlib
3	Aleppo Governorate	Aleppo
4	Raqqa Governorate	Raqqa
5	Hasakah Governorate	Hasakah
6	Tartus Governorate	Tartus
7	Hama Governorate	Hama
8	Deir ez-Zor Governorate	Deir ez-Zor
9	Homs Governorate	Homs
10	Damascus Governorate	Damascus
11	Rif Dimashq Governorate	Douma
12	Quneitra Governorate	Quneitra
13	Daraa Governorate	Daraa
14	Suwayda Governorate	Suwayda

== Foreign policy ==
=== Relations with the Soviet Union and Russia ===
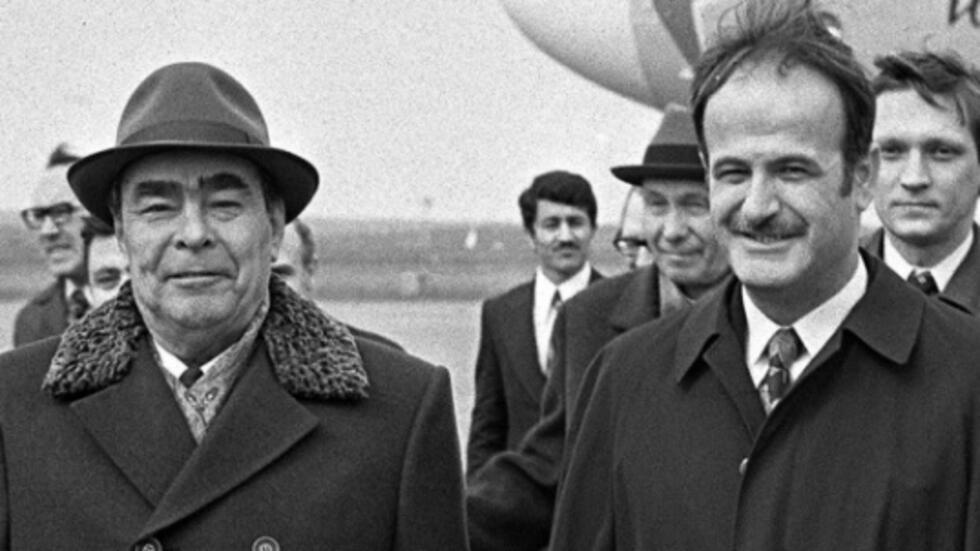
Assad and Brezhnev meet in Moscow, 1974

Following the 1963 Syrian coup, the ruling Syrian Ba'ath Party established close relations with the Soviet Union, increasing Soviet power and influence in Syria. The far-left neo-Ba'athist Syrian Ba'ath pursued a very close alliance with Soviet Union. Following the Sixth National Congress in 1963, the party publicly adopted the doctrine of ideological alliance with the Eastern Bloc:

"The Arab Socialist Ba'th Party had placed the question of the struggle against imperialism in its international and human framework and considered the socialist camp a positive, active force in the struggle against imperialism... a homeland crushed and exploited by imperialism render the fundamental starting points of the socialist camp more harmonious with the interests of our Arab homeland and more in sympathy with our Arab people."

In 1971, Syrian president Hafez al-Assad signed an agreement with the Soviet Union, allowing it to open its naval military base in Tartus and gain a stable presence in the Middle East amid the Cold War. Thousands of Syrian military officers and educated professionals studied in Russia during Hafez al-Assad's rule.

Thousands of Soviet advisors and technicians assisted the Syrian Arab Army during the 1973 Yom Kippur War with Israel. 3,750 tonnes of aid was airlifted during the war to Syria. By the end of October 1973, the Soviet Union sent 63,000 tonnes of aid, mainly to Syria to replace its losses during the war. Soviet–Syrian relations became strained in 1976 due to Hafez al-Assad's intervention in the Lebanese civil war and the Syrian occupation of Lebanon, as the Soviet Union did not want a confrontation between the Assad regime and the Palestine Liberation Organization, who were both Soviet allies. The Soviets froze weapons supplies to Syria, whereas Syria denied the Soviets access to its naval bases. It wasn't until April 1977 that the two states improved their relations. Syria refused to condemn the 1979 Soviet invasion of Afghanistan and signed a twenty-year Treaty of Friendship and Cooperation in October 1980.

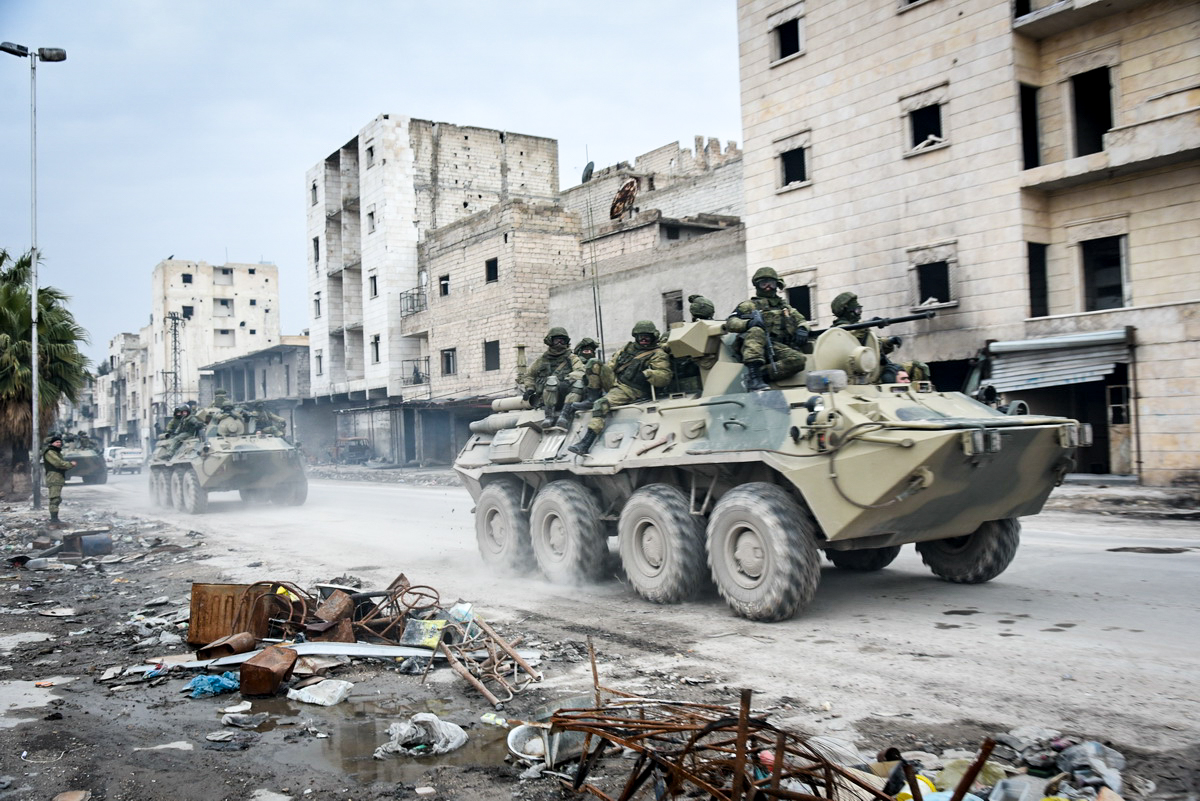
Russian sappers in Aleppo during the Syrian civil war, December 2016

The Soviet Union's successor state, Russia, strongly supported Bashar al-Assad's regime throughout the Syrian civil war, which began in 2011. From 2012, Russia with China repeatedly vetoed Western-sponsored draft resolutions in the UN Security Council that condemned Bashar's government for attacking civilians and demanded Bashar's resignation, which would have opened the possibility of United Nations sanctions against his government. In September 2015, the Federation Council authorized Russian president Vladimir Putin to use armed forces in Syria. Russian air and missile strikes began targeting the Islamic State, the Army of Conquest, al-Nusra Front, and the Free Syrian Army.

=== Relations with Iran ===
Syria and Iran are historic and strategic allies, with Syria being regarded as Iran's "closest ally". The relationship between the Iranian and Syrian governments has sometimes been described as an Axis of Resistance. Historically, the two countries shared a common animosity towards the Iraqi Ba'ath Party and Saddam Hussein, with Syria providing military aid to Iran during the Iran–Iraq War. After Hafez al-Assad's death in 2000, Bashar al-Assad continued the relationship by supporting Hezbollah and various Iranian proxies; with the alliance being described as "the central component of his security doctrine".

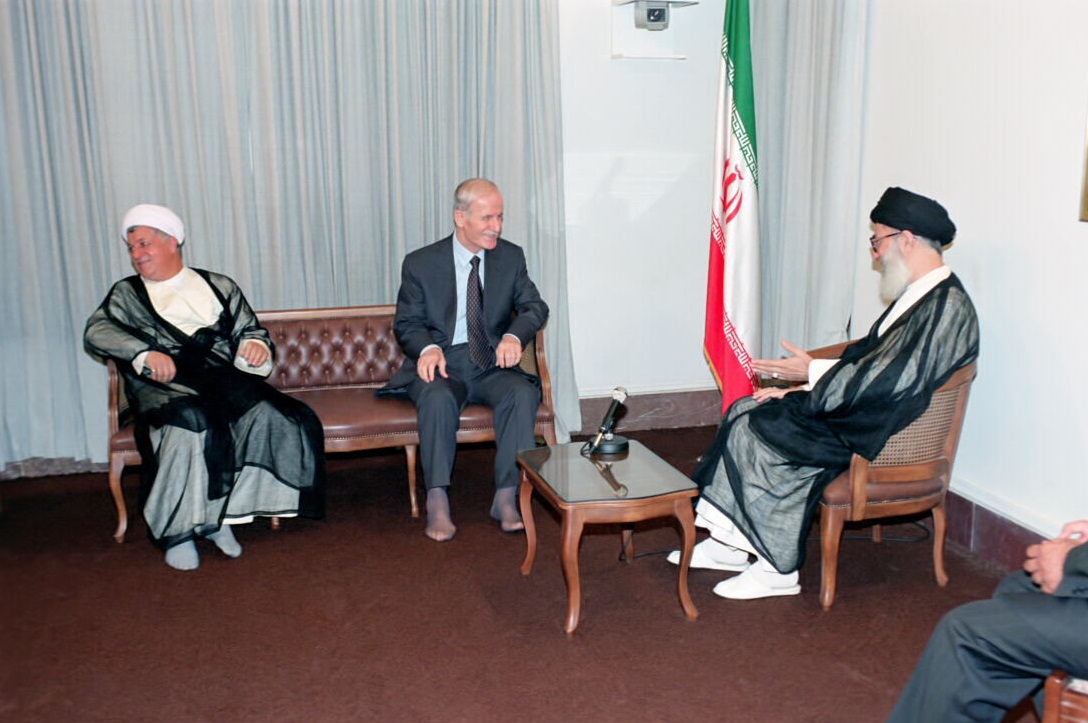
Hafez al-Assad visit to Iran, August 1997

Following the outbreak of Syrian revolution in 2011, Iran began politically and militarily aiding the Assad government. The Guardian reported in May 2011 that the Iranian IRGC had increased its "level of technical support and personnel support" to strengthen Syrian military's "ability to deal with protesters". Since the beginning of the insurgency in Syria, Iran has provided training, technical support, and combat troops to the Assad government. Estimates of the number of Iranian personnel in Syria range from hundreds to tens of thousands. Lebanese Hezbollah fighters, backed by Iran's government, have taken direct combat roles since 2012. From the summer of 2013, Iran and Hezbollah provided important battlefield support to Syria, allowing it to make advances against Syrian rebels. As of 2023, Iran maintains 55 military bases in Syria and 515 other military points, the majority in Aleppo and Deir Ezzor governorates and the Damascus suburbs; these are 70% of the foreign military sites in the country.

=== Relations with Iraq ===
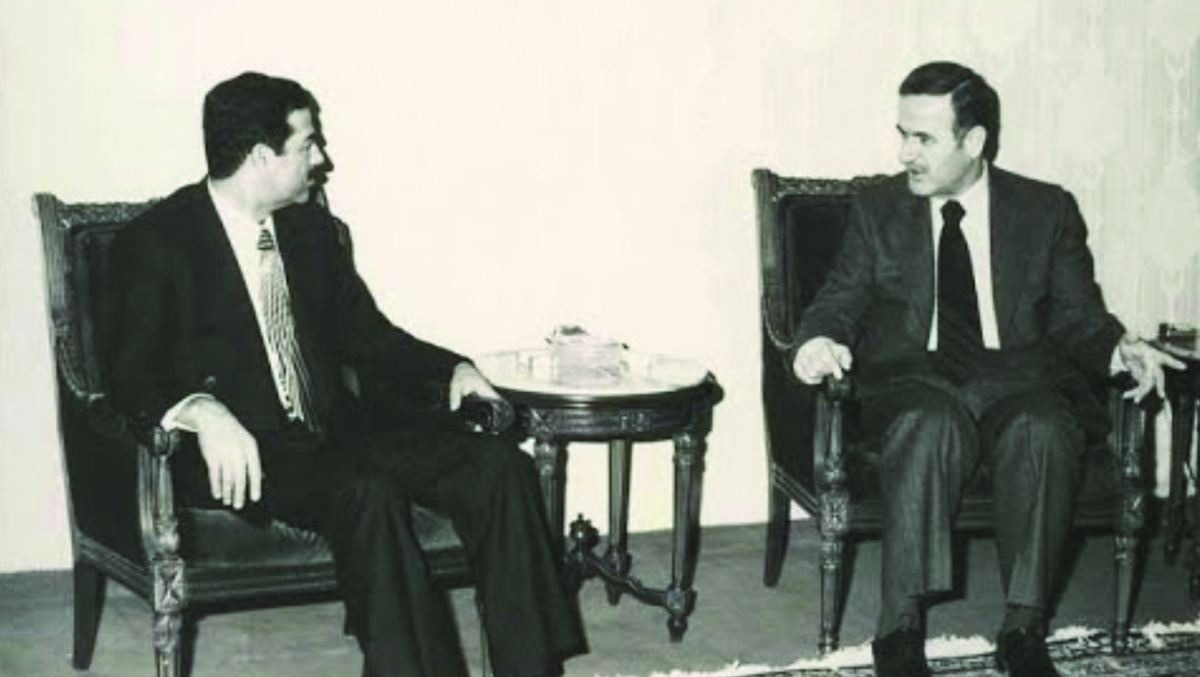
Syrian President Hafez al-Assad (right) with Iraqi President Saddam Hussein (left) at meeting in Damascus, 1979

Syria was a prominent adversary of Ba'athist Iraq during the Cold War and maintained a fierce rivalry with it, despite many similarities with the Iraqi regime. Syria supported Iran by weapons in the Iran–Iraq War and closed the Iraqi oil pipelines that pass through it, and joined the American-led coalition against Iraq during the Gulf War. During the Islamist uprising in Syria, the Iraqi government of Saddam Hussein had provided arms as well as logistical support to the Muslim Brotherhood, particularly during the 1982 Hama massacre. However, by 1997, Syrian president Hafez al-Assad began reestablishing relations with Iraqi president Saddam Hussein. The ascendance of Bashar in 2000 boosted this process, and Syria ignored the sanctions against Iraq, helping Iraq to illegally import oil.

Bashar al-Assad opposed the American-led invasion of Iraq in 2003. He sheltered Iraqi Ba'athists and allowed volunteers through Syria to fight the Americans. Syrian pressure for reviewing the de-Ba'athification policy and support for insurgents was despised by the new Iraqi government. As a result, the American-installed government in Iraq suspended oil supplies to Syria. In 2004, The U.S. commander of the coalition forces in Iraq, George W. Casey Jr., accused Syria of hosting Iraqi insurgent leaders who were co-ordinating the anti-American insurgency from their bases in Syria.

Izzat Ibrahim al-Douri, former Vice Chairman of the Revolutionary Command Council of Ba'athist Iraq, had close relations with Ba'athist Syria. Despite the historical differences between the two Ba'ath factions, al-Douri had reportedly urged Saddam to open oil pipelines with Syria, building a financial relationship with the Assad family. After the American invasion of Iraq in 2003, al-Douri reportedly fled to Damascus, from where he organized anti-American militant groups and co-ordinated major combat operations during the Iraqi insurgency. In 2009, General David Petraeus, who was at the time heading the U.S. Central Command, stated that al-Douri was residing in Syria.

In 2006, Syria recognized the post-invasion Iraqi government and resumed ties. However relations still remained poor until 2011, when American troops withdrew from Iraq and the Syrian revolution erupted, during which hundreds of thousands of protestors took to the streets; demanding the overthrow of the Assad regime. Both governments alongside Iran formed a tripartite regional alliance as both Iran and Maliki government in Iraq were critical of the potential rise of Saudi influence in Syria, a Sunni-majority country. Unlike most of the Arab League countries, Iraq rejected calls for al-Assad to step down.

=== Relations with the United States ===
Relations between Ba'athist Syria and the United States were strained in 1967 following the Six-Day War which resulted in the Israeli occupation of the Golan Heights, but relations resumed in 1974 following the Agreement on Disengagement between Israel and Syria. Syria was added to the U.S. list of State Sponsors of Terrorism on 29 December 1979, and remains the only state from the original 1979 list to remain on the list.

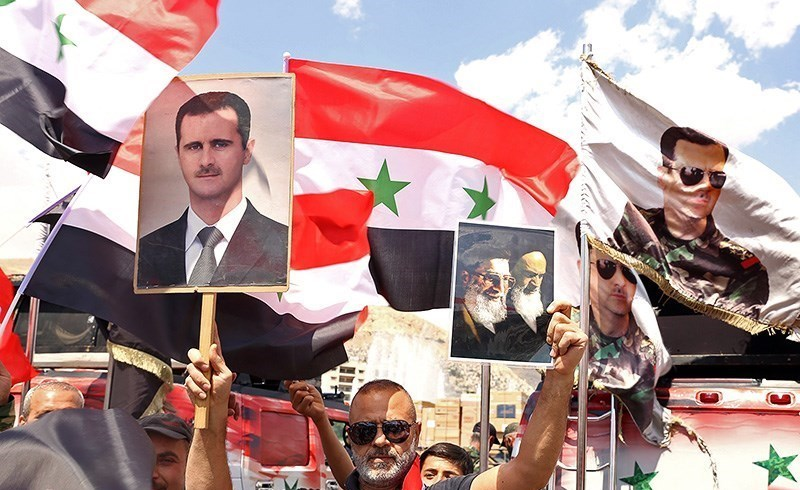
Pro-government Syrians demonstration Damascus after US-led missile strikes in 2018

Relations between the United States and Syria deteriorated due to Syria's opposition to the Iraq War. The Syrian government also refused to prevent foreign fighters from using Syrian borders to enter Iraq and deport officials from the former Saddam Hussein government that support Iraqi insurgency. In May 2003, the U.S. Secretary of State, Colin Powell, visited Damascus to demand Syrian closure of the offices of Hamas, Islamic Jihad and the Popular Front for the Liberation of Palestine.

Throughout the Syrian civil war, the United States repeatedly called on president Bashar al-Assad to resign and imposed sanctions on his government.

== Economy ==
During the Ba'athist rule the economy of the Syrian Arab Republic experienced both ups and downs. After the Ba'ath Party came to power, the Syrian economy underwent a radical socialist transformation, nationalizing industrial enterprises and distributing land among landless peasants and farmers. By the mid-1960s, government-sponsored land reform and nationalization of major industries and foreign investments had confirmed the new socialist direction of Syria's economic policy. As the state assumed greater control over economic decision-making by adopting centralized planning and strictly regulating commercial transactions, Syria experienced a substantial loss of skilled workers, administrators, and their capital. Despite the political upheavals, which undermined the confidence of landowners, merchants, and industrialists, the state successfully implemented large-scale development projects to expand industry, agriculture, and infrastructure. By the 1970s, 85% of agricultural lands were distributed to landless peasant populations and tenant farmers. Banks, oil companies, power production and 90% of large-scale industries were nationalised.

By the end of the 1970s, the Syrian economy had shifted from its traditional agrarian base to an economy dominated by the service, industrial, and commercial sectors. Massive expenditures for development of irrigation, electricity, water, road building projects, irisin plants and expansion of health services and education to rural areas contributed to prosperity. However, the economy remained dependent on foreign aid and grants to finance the growing deficits both in the budget and in trade. Syria, as a front-line state in the Arab-Israeli conflict, was also vulnerable to the vagaries of Middle East politics, relying on Arab aid transfers and Soviet assistance to support mounting defense expenditures.

However, by the mid-1980s, the country's economic climate had shifted from prosperity to austerity. Syria's economic boom collapsed as a result of the rapid fall of world oil prices, lower export revenues, drought affecting agricultural production, and falling worker remittances. Also, Arab aid levels decreased very much because of economic retrenchment in the oil-producing states and Syrian support for Iran in the Iran-Iraq War. Real per capita GDP fell 22% between 1982 and 1989. To restore the economy, the government sharply reduced spending, cut back imports, encouraged more private sector and foreign investment, and launched an anticorruption campaign against smugglers and black-market money changers. In July 1984, the government formed an effective anti-smuggling squad to control the Lebanon–Syria borders: it's seized $3.8 million in goods during its first week of work. However, massive defense outlays continued to divert resources from productive investments. In the 1990s, the government launched a major campaign of economic relaxation known as Al-Ta`addudiyya Al-Iqtisadiyya.

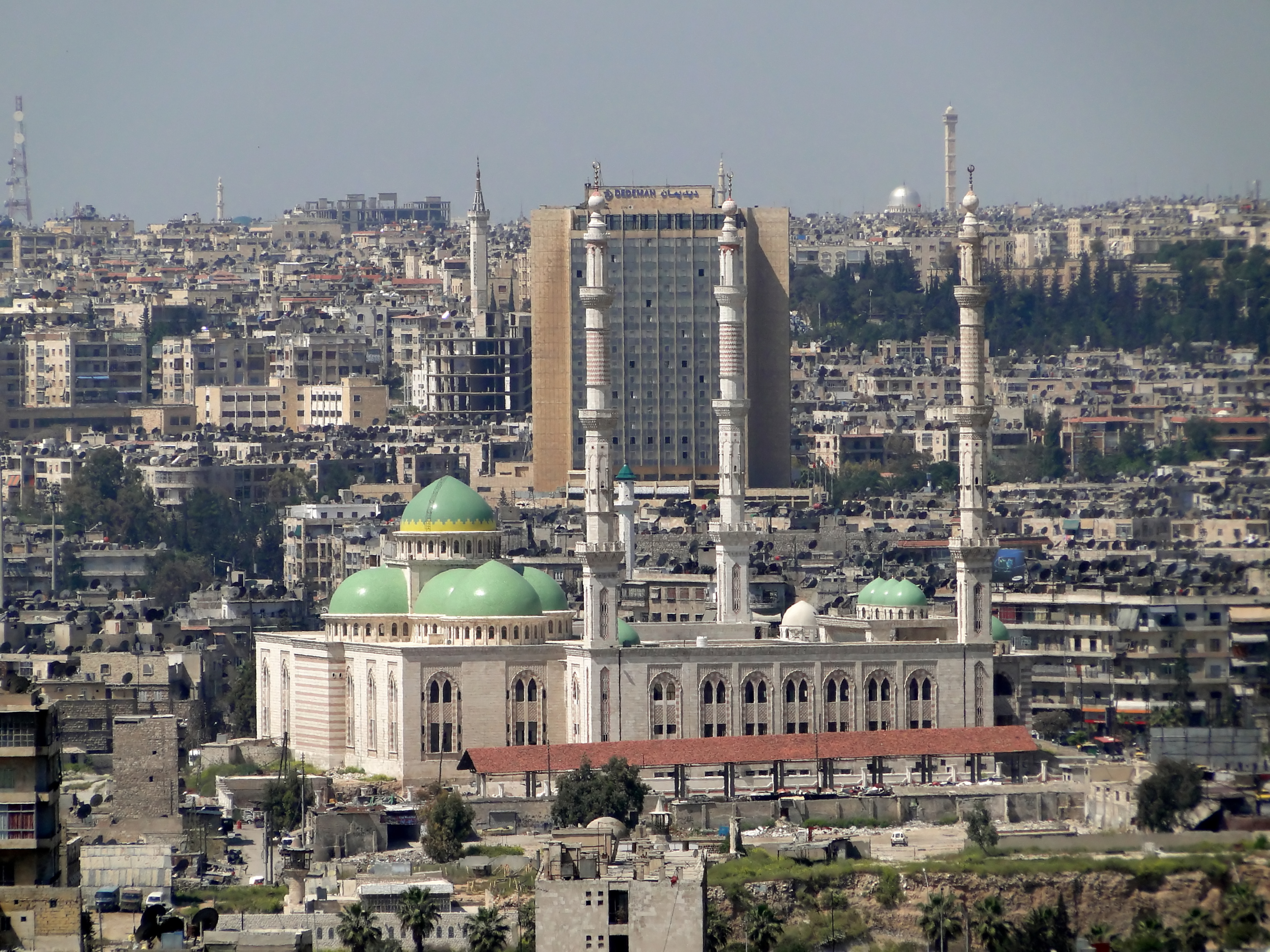
Aleppo, economic capital of Syria

The destruction and dislocation associated with the civil war have devastated Syria's economy. By the end of 2013, the UN estimated total economic damage from the Syrian Civil War at $143 billion. In 2018, the World Bank estimated that about one-third of Syria's housing stock and one half of its health and education facilities have been destroyed by the conflict. According to the World Bank, a cumulative total of $226 billion in GDP was lost due to the conflict from 2011 to 2016. The Syrian economy suffered from conflict-related hyperinflation. The Syrian annual inflation rate is one of the highest in the world. The national currency, the Syrian pound, tumbled in mid-2020 against the US dollar, therefore stating that Syrian economy was only taking a turn for the worse. The pound, which traded at LS 47 to the dollar before the 2011 uprising, plunged to over LS 3,000 to the dollar. Prices of basic goods have skyrocketed and some staples have disappeared from the market as merchants and the public struggled to keep up with the rising cost of living. During the civil war, the Syrian economy relied upon dwindling customs and income taxes which are heavily bolstered by lines of credit from Iran, Russia and China. Iran is believed to have spent between $6 billion and US$20 billion per year on Syria during the first four years of the civil war. The Syrian pound lost 80% of its value, with the economy becoming part state-owned and part war economy. A report by Strategic Foresight Group, an India-based think tank, calculated the opportunity cost of conflict for the Middle East for 1991–2010 at US$12 trillion in 2006 dollars. Syria's share in this was US$152 billion, more than four times the projected 2010 GDP of US$36 billion. The Syrian Center for Policy Research stated in March 2015 that, by then, nearly three million Syrians had lost their jobs because of the civil war, causing the loss of the primary source of income of more than 12 million people; unemployment levels "surged" from 14.9 percent in 2011 to 57.7 percent at the end of 2014. In 2024, the World Bank estimated that the Syrian GDP had contracted by 84% from 2010 to 2023. As of 2023, its nominal GDP was $6.2 billion.

=== Agriculture ===
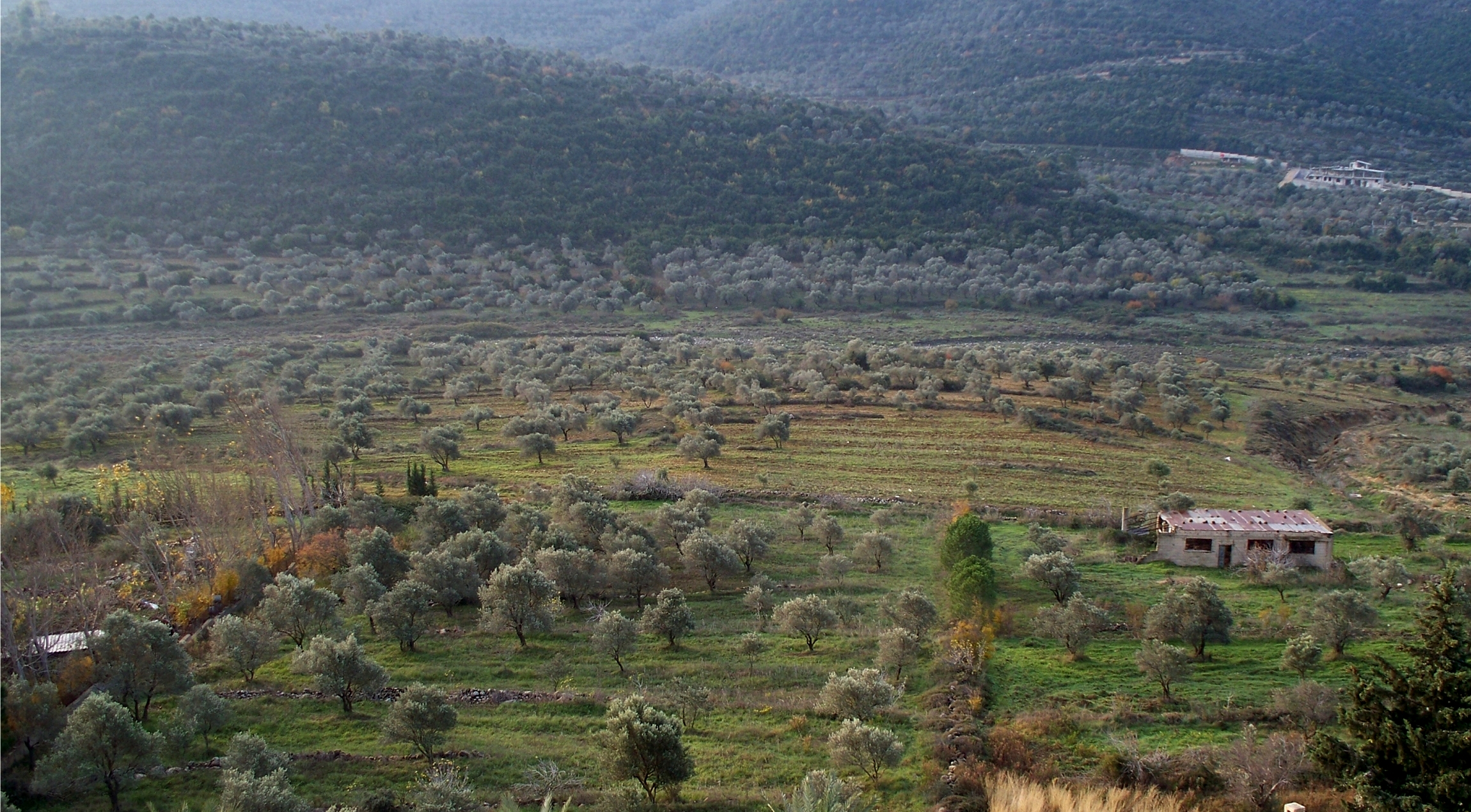
Olive groves in Homs province

Agriculture is a high priority in Syria's economic development plans, as the government seeks to achieve food self-sufficiency, increase export earnings, and halt rural out-migration. The first Ba'ath coup installed a harsher limit on landownership with a maximum of 15 to 55 hectares per individual for irrigated land and between 80 and 200 hectares per individual for non-irrigated land. This limit was based on the fertility of land itself. The speed at which the expropriation of land occurred increased so that almost one million hectares were eventually expropriated and 240.000 hectares had been redistributed in a span of a year and a half. With another military coup in 1966, when a more radical regime was established, the land expropriated from large landowners were no longer redistributed. Instead, the lands became state-owned properties where farmers work and do not have rights to ownership. In addition, the state decided the kinds of the crops to be planted, handling, and marketing of the products. Particularly growing cotton and wheat. Over time, the importance of the agricultural sector in the Syrian economy gradually declined as other sectors grew more rapidly.

In 1981, as in the 1970s, 53% of the population was still classified as rural, although movement to the cities continued to accelerate. However, in contrast to the 1970s, when 50% of the labor force was employed in agriculture, by 1983 agriculture employed only 30% of the labor force. Furthermore, by the mid-1980s, unprocessed farm products accounted for only 4% of exports, equivalent to 7% of non-petroleum exports. Industry, commerce, and transportation still depended on farm produce and related agro-business, but agriculture's preeminent position had clearly eroded. By 1985 agriculture (including a little forestry and fishing) contributed only 16.5% to GDP, down from 22.1% in 1976. Thanks to sustained capital investment, infrastructure development, subsidies of inputs, and price supports, before the civil war Syria went from a net importer of many agricultural products to an exporter of cotton, fruits, vegetables, and other foodstuffs. One of the prime reasons for this turnaround was the government's investment in huge irrigation systems in northern and northeastern Syria. The agriculture sector, as of 2009, employed about 17% of the labor force and generates about 21% of the gross domestic product, of which livestock accounted for 16%, and fruit and grains for more than 40%. During the Syrian Civil War, the agricultural sector has witnessed a drop in producing all kinds of commodities such as wheat, cotton and olives, due to the lack of security and immigration of agricultural workforce.

=== Petroleum industry ===
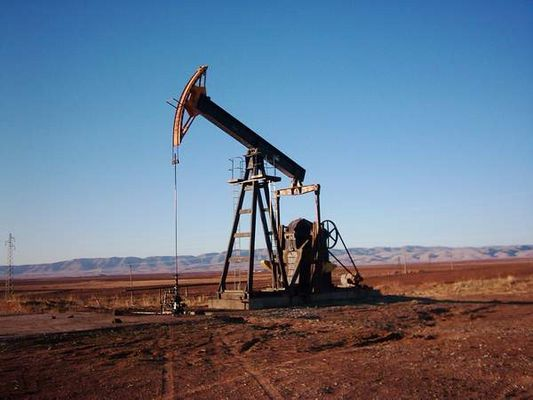
A pumpjack in Syria's Rmelan oil fields

The Ba'ath Party nationalized many oil companies in Syria. The Syrian oil industry took off in 1968, when the Karatchok oil field began production after a pipeline connecting it to the Homs refinery was completed, although Syria did not begin exporting oil until the mid-1980s.

Syria is a relatively small oil producer, that accounted for just 0.5% of the global production in 2010, falling to less than 0.05% by 2016. Although Syria is not a major oil exporter by Middle Eastern standards, oil is a large industry forming a major component of the Syrian economy. Iran provided Syria with millions of free and discounted barrels of oil throughout the 1980s. According to the 2009 Syria Report of the Oxford Business Group, the oil sector accounted for 23% of government revenues, 20% of exports and 22% of GDP in 2008. Syria exported roughly 150,000 bpd in 2008, and oil accounted for a majority of the country's export income. Syria's two biggest oil companies are the Syrian Petroleum Company (SPC), which is owned by the Ministry of Petroleum and Mineral Resources, and Al-Furat Petroleum Company which is 50% owned by General Petroleum Corporation and the other 50% are foreign owned. During civil war oil reserves are expected to decrease in the coming years, and Syria has become a net oil importer.

Syria's oil sector has been hit by the Civil War and international sanctions imposed on Syria. Syria produced 406,000 barrels per day (bpd) in 2008, but the oil production dropped to 353,000 bpd in 2011 and had plunged to just 24,000 bpd by 2018, a reduction of more than 90%, according to the BP Statistical Review of World Energy. During the civil war, the self-declared state of Islamic State of Iraq and the Levant (ISIL/ISIS) controlled most oil fields in eastern Syria starting from 2013, in which they smuggled the oil located in Deir ez-Zor province outside Syria by producing 34,000–40,000 barrels per day (bpd). Quality of Petroleum determined price of each barrel sold at the wellhead 25 to 45 dollars.

=== Industry and manufacturing ===
Industry has been a vital part of the Syrian economy in Ba'athist era for many years, because the Ba'athist government placed great emphasis on modernizing Syrian industry. Major industries include; petroleum, textiles, food processing, beverages, tobacco, phosphate rock mining, cement, oil seeds crushing and car assembly.

The industrial sector, which includes mining, manufacturing, construction, and petroleum, accounted for 27.3 percent of gross domestic product (GDP) in 2010 and employed about 16 percent of the labor force. Syria's manufacturing sector was largely state dominated until the 1990s, when economic reforms allowed greater local and foreign private-sector participation. Private participation remains constrained, however, by the lack of investment funds, input/output pricing limits, cumbersome customs and foreign exchange regulations, and poor marketing. Like all other sectors of the economy, Syrian industry has declined due to the civil war.

=== Drug industry ===
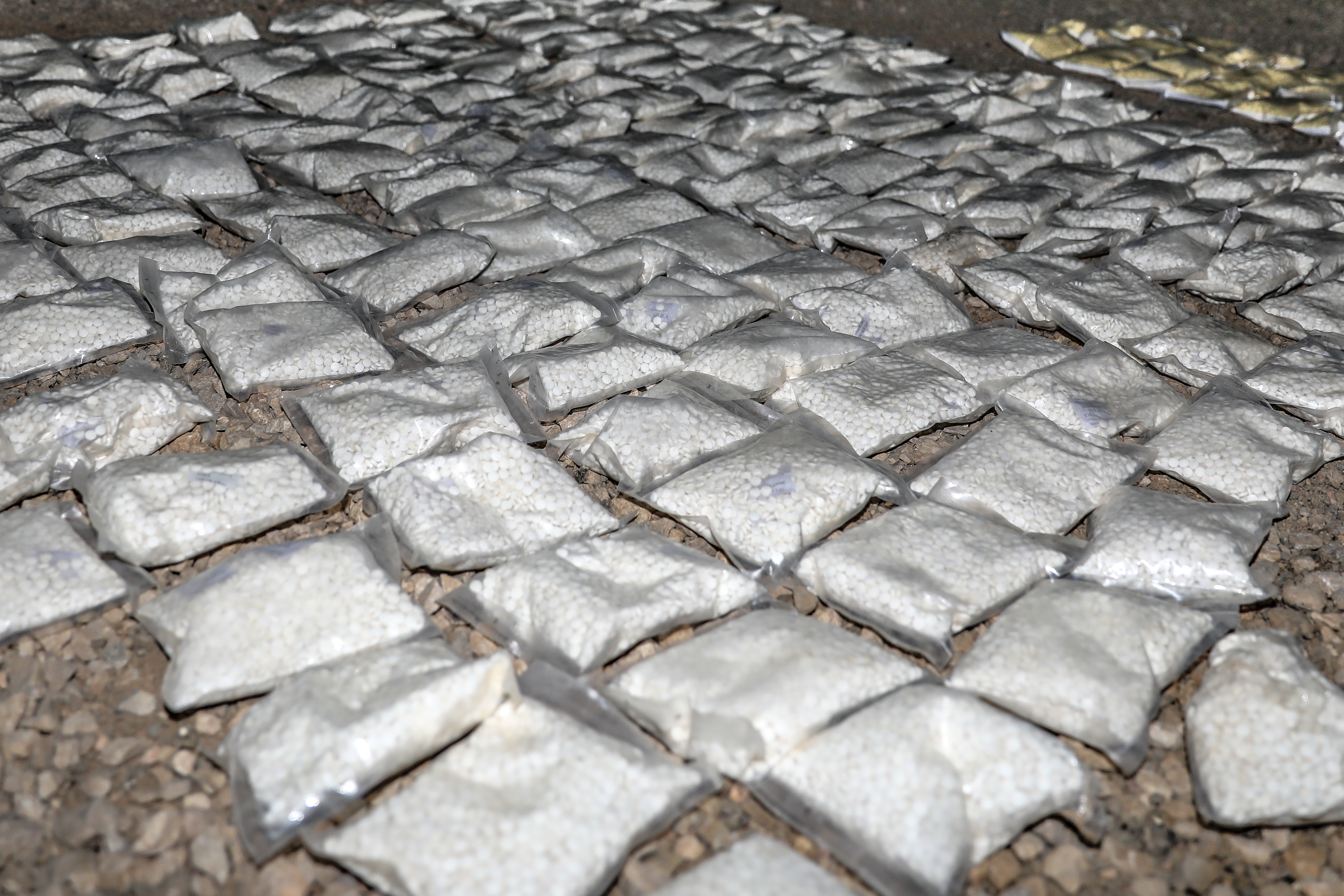
Captagon seized by the US army in southern Syria, 2018

The Ba'athist Syrian Captagon industry was the state-sponsored captagon manufacturing and trafficking apparatus of Ba'athist Syria. Ba'athist Syria exported the drug to various countries, mainly in the Middle East region, including Jordan, Iraq, Saudi Arabia, Gulf states, and Egypt. The drug export was one of the main sources of income for the government of Bashar al-Assad, helping it to prop up the economy during the Syrian Civil War. The industry was run by a clandestine network of warlords, drug cartels, crime families and business men loyal to the Assad dynasty, operating across the regions of Syria and Lebanon. Another major drug which was manufactured and smuggled globally is hashish. As of 2021, the export of illegal drugs eclipsed the country's legal exports, leading the New York Times to call Syria "the world's newest narcostate". The drug exports allowed the Assad regime to generate hard currency, pay daily wages for the deteriorating state army, finance private militias and hire mercenaries.

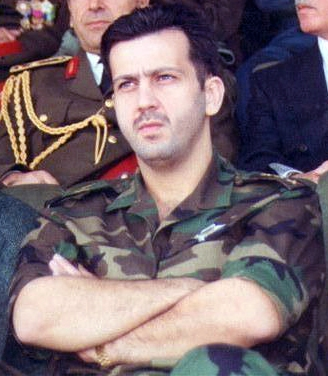
Maher al-Assad was responsible for most of the Captagon exports.

Based on 2023 estimates, about 80% of world's captagon was produced in Syria and exported from the port of Latakia with the assistance of the Ba'athist Syrian government under the command of Maher al-Assad, brother of the president. Estimates suggest that the Captagon trade market ranges from $5.7 billion to $57 billion. This estimated revenue was three times greater than the combined operations of the Mexican cartels. Over the years, hundreds of millions of Captagon pills were smuggled into Jordan, Iraq, Saudi Arabia, and Gulf countries. One of the main smuggling routes was through the Anbar province, which borders Syria, Jordan, and Saudi Arabia. In 2021, more than 250 million Captagon pills were seized worldwide, 18 times more than the number of pills seized in 2017. Additionally, according to Al Jazeera, in 2022, Jordan seized 65 million Captagon pills in Syria en route to its territory. In 2015, the Secretary of Saudi Arabia's National Committee for Drug Control reported that the majority of Captagon consumers are aged 12 to 22. The New York Times reported in December 2021 that the 4th Armoured Division, commanded by Maher al-Assad, oversees much of the production and distribution of Captagon, among other drugs, reinforcing Syria's status as a narco-state on the Mediterranean Sea. The unit controls manufacturing facilities, packing plants, and smuggling networks all across Syria (which have started to also move crystal meth). The division's security bureau, headed by Maj. Gen. Ghassan Bilal, provides protection for factories and along smuggling routes to the port city Latakia and to border crossings with Jordan and Lebanon. The captagon industry is also supported by the Iran-backed Shia group Hezbollah. According to estimates based on official data from a 2022 AFP investigation, captagon surpassed all of the country's other legal exports combined.

== Military ==
=== Armed Forces ===
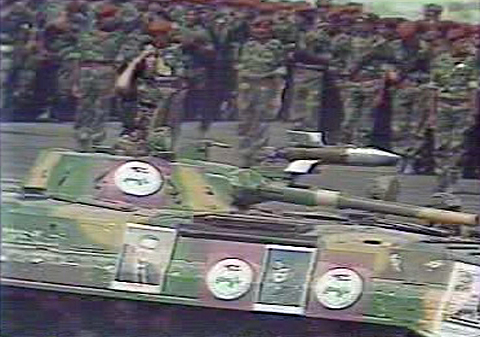
Syrian BMP-1 on military parade, 1990

Syria under Ba'athist rule was characterized by a military dictatorship and a police state, where the Syrian Army brought the Ba'ath Party to power. The regime's survival was largely enabled by the Ba'ath Party's "Ba'athization" of the army, and its heavy reliance on the army-security apparatus. From 1963, the top army command in the Syrian Army became increasingly Ba'athist, while Ba'athist officers became progressive. The Ba'athists pursued a very active militaristic policy aimed at some kind of "mobilization of the Syrian people to fight the Israeli enemy." After Hafez al-Assad rose to power, he purged Sunni middle- and upper-class officers, replacing them with rural minoritarian ones, and consolidated his power with the establishment of an Alawite-recruited "praetorian guard" that helped ensure regime control over the military. The combined armed forces of Ba'athist Syria from 1963 to 2024 were officially known as the Syrian Arab Armed Forces. In addition to the army, a number of militias operated in Ba'athist Syria, such as the Workers' Battalions or the People's Army.

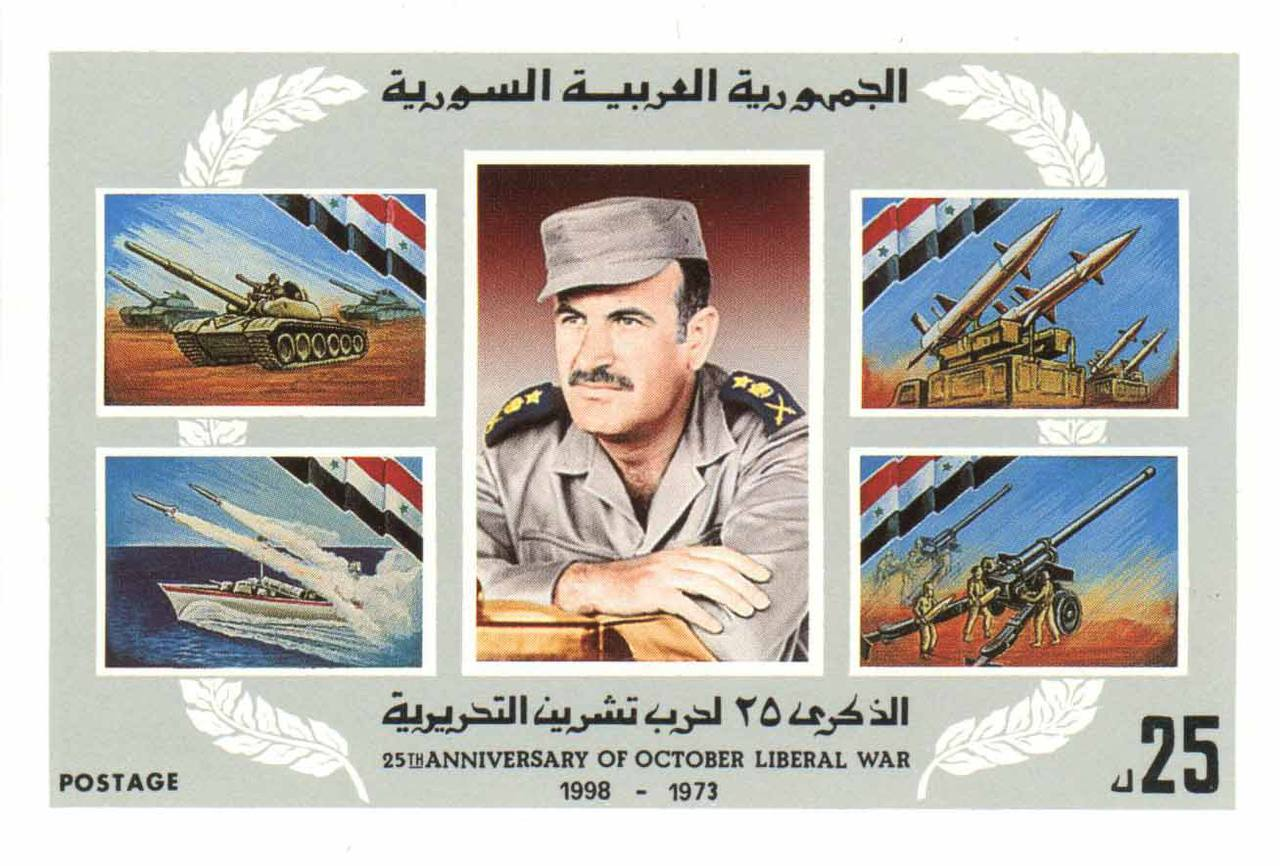
Syrian postage stamp commemorating the Yom Kippur War, issued in 1998, depicting Syrian Army tanks, warships, air defense systems, artillery, and President Hafez al-Assad in military uniform.

Following the Syrian loss during the Six-Day War with Israel, Hafez al-Assad initiated a huge expansion of the military to achieve military parity with Israel. Assad gave a high priority to building a strong military and preparing it for a confrontation with Israel, both for offensive and defensive purposes and to enable him to politically negotiate the return of the Golan Heights from a position of military strength. He allocated up to 70 percent of the annual budget to the military build-up and received large quantities of modern arms from the Soviet Union. The Syrian Army, which was mainly a conscripted force, increased from 50,000 personnel in 1967 to 225,000 in 1973, and to over 500,000 in 1986, but it was reduced to 400,000 by the 1990s.

By the early 1980s, Syria was left alone in the fight against Israel: Egypt signed peace treaty with Israel, Iraq diverted all its resources to the war with Iran, Jordan and Saudi Arabia reoriented their attention to post-revolutionary Iran, seeing it as a greater threat. Syria had almost no full-fledged allies in the region (except Iran), since relations with other Arab countries were shaky. As a result, Assad was forced to develop his new doctrine of the Strategic Balance, aimed primarily at a single-handed military confrontation with Israel, which pushed Syria to even greater militarization. And this doctrine gave rise to a new intra-Arab policy and was aimed at consolidating Assad's internal front. As a result, - with the help of the Soviet Union, Assad built a large military equipped with modern tanks, airplanes and long-range ground-to-ground missiles capable of launching chemical warheads into all Israeli cities. Assad also believed that Syria had more potential for expanding its armed forces than Israel: in his opinion, Syria was capable of increasing its army to one million soldiers, while Israel had already reached its mobilization maximum. This enabled him to deter Israel from attacking Syria and in the event of war, to cause heavy losses to Israel.

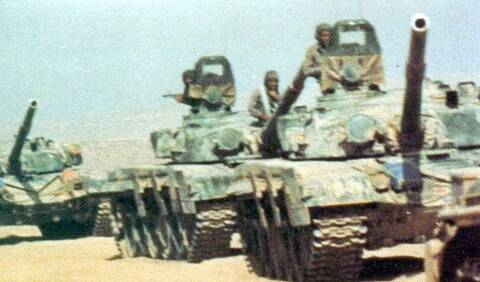
Syrian army T-72 Ural in exercises

The degree of militarization of Ba'athist Syria was indecently high. Syria's air force and tank fleets were not much smaller (if not larger) than those of large European countries. In 1979, Syria was one of the four largest arms importers in the world (between 1961 and 1979, it imported weapons worth $7.4 billion, one of the highest figures). In 1981, defense spending amounted to 13.1 percent of GNP. In 1982, Syria spent $2.4 billion on defense and internal security, which was 30 percent of the total government budget for the year. In 1990, Syria was the fourth most militarized country in the world in proportion to population, with 35.9 soldiers for every 1,000 inhabitants, and the 12th highest per capita defense spender. With the collapse of the Soviet Union in 1991, Syria lost its main supplier of military equipment, contributing to the isolation of the Syrian Army. In 2005, 50% of Syria's national budget was contributed to military and intelligence spending, and Syria had a standing army of 215,000 soldiers, and over 400,000 upon mobilization, as well as 4,700 tanks, 4,500 personnel carriers, 850 surface-to-air missiles, 4,000 anti-aircraft guns, and 611 combat planes. Raymond Hinnebusch described this process as a "product of a nationalist party and an army radicalized by the conflict with Israel, developed under Hafez al-Assad into a huge national security apparatus designed to confront Israel."

Most of the local military developments for the army are carried out by 3 companies: Syrian Scientific Studies and Research Center (SSRC), Établissement Industriel de la Défense (EID) and Syrian Defense Laboratories (SDL).

=== Chemical weapons program ===
Until 2013, Syria had one of the largest arsenals of chemical weapons and the largest chemical weapons program of any in the Middle East. Syria was accumulating a huge arsenal as a deterrent to Israel and Turkey. For some time, Syria was believed to have the world's third-largest stockpile of chemical weapons, after the United States and Russia.

According to some US analysts, Syria was provided with some chemical weapons and delivery systems prior to the 1973 Yom Kippur War. According to US intelligence reports, Syria began to develop its chemical weapons capabilities in the later 1970s, with supplies and training from the Soviet Union, and likely with equipment and precursor chemicals from private companies in Western Europe. However Syrian production of chemical weapons is not believed to have begun until the mid-1980s. In 1988, a U.S. analyst described Syria's chemical weapon capability as more advanced than the Iraqi chemical weapons program. A 2007 assessment indicated that Syria was capable of producing several hundred tons of chemical weapon agents per year. Another 2007 report said that Syria was believed to have a stockpile of hundreds of tonnes of chemical weapons agents. Syria was believed to be able to deliver chemical weapons by aerial bombs, surface-to-surface missiles and artillery rockets.

The destruction of Syria's chemical weapons that the Assad government had declared was completed by August 2014, yet further disclosures, incomplete documentation, and allegations of withholding part of Syria's chemical weapons stockpile since mean that serious concerns regarding chemical weapons and related sites in Syria remain.

=== Nuclear weapons program ===
While Syria has never possessed nuclear weapons, the US and Israel alleged that Syria began a program to pursue nuclear weapons in 1979.

In the 90s, Hafez Assad entered into an agreement with North Korea on the construction of a nuclear reactor in Syria, hoping to give his inexperienced heir Bashar a strong argument in international dialogs. Syria has been a party to the Nuclear Non-Proliferation Treaty (NPT) since 24 September 1969, and has a limited civil nuclear program. Despite claiming to be a proponent of a Weapons of Mass Destruction Free Zone (WMDFZ) in the Middle East (Syria has not handed a letter confirming its support for WMDFZ), Syria was accused of pursuing a military nuclear program with a reported nuclear facility in a desert Syrian region of Deir ez-Zor. The reactor's components were believed to have been designed and manufactured in North Korea, with the reactor's striking similarity in shape and size to the North Korean Yongbyon Nuclear Scientific Research Center. The nuclear reactor was still under construction, but at the late stage. That information alarmed Israeli military and intelligence to such a degree that the idea of a targeted airstrike was conceived, resulting in Operation Outside the Box on 6 September 2007 that saw as many as eight Israeli aircraft destroying the facility. Israeli government is said to have bounced the idea of the operation off the US Bush administration, although the latter declined to participate. U.S. intelligence officials claimed low confidence that the site was meant for weapons development. The suspected reactor was destroyed in the Israeli attack, which was suspected to have killed ten North Korean workers. Until 2018, Israel officially did not admit that he had inflicted an airstrike, and the Assad regime did not admit that he was building a nuclear reactor.

In December 2021, there were reports from Middle East Monitor, that Syria was building a nuclear reactor on the El-Gab plain in the north-west of Syria again with the support of the North Korea and Iran.

== Human rights ==
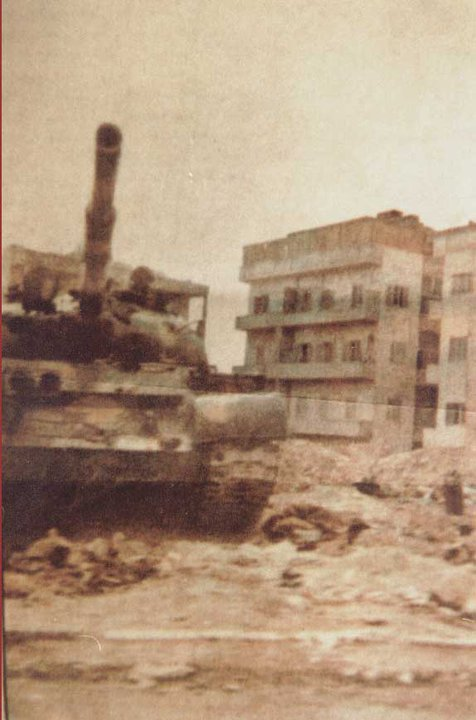
A Syrian tank in the ruins of the city of Hama in 1982 after a government month-long massacre that killed tens of thousands of civilians

Human rights in Ba'athist Syria were effectively non-existent. The government's human rights record was considered one of the worst in the world. As a result, Ba'athist Syria was globally condemned by prominent international organizations, including the United Nations, Human Rights Watch, Amnesty International, and the European Union. Civil liberties, political rights, freedom of speech and assembly were severely restricted under the Ba'athist government of Bashar al-Assad, which was regarded as "one of the world's most repressive regimes".The 50th edition of Freedom in the World, the annual report published by Freedom House since 1973, designates Syria as "Worst of the Worst" among the "Not Free" countries. The report lists Syria as one of the two countries to get the lowest possible score (1/100).

Ba'athist Syria has a long history of arbitrary arrests and detentions, not only in its own country but also in neighboring Lebanon, much of which was occupied by the Syrian Arab Army due to its civil war (at least 17,000 people have disappeared in Lebanon during the occupation, presumably while held in Syria). Martial law, in place since 1963, allowed the government to abolish civil law and replace it with military law, impose curfews, and resort to military tribunals. During the decades of rule by the Assad dynasty from 1970 to 2011, more than 70,000 Syrians were forcibly disappeared, more than 40,000 were executed through extrajudicial killings, and hundreds of thousands of civilians were displaced by deportations.

In Lebanon, Ba'athist Syria has persecuted and executed its political opponents and those who oppose its presence in Lebanon (as well as in its own country). Syrian military intelligence and army has been responsible for a number of kidnappings and assassinations of Lebanese citizens, from anti-Syrian leaders and presidents to ordinary civilians. The army has also targeted representatives of the Red Cross organization.

=== Power of the Mukhabarat ===
During the Ba'athist period, there were almost half a dozen intelligence services in Syria, known mostly as the mukhabarat: Military Intelligence Directorate, Air Force Intelligence Directorate, General Intelligence Directorate and Political Security Directorate. They all was united under rule and coordination of a powerful National Security Bureau of the Ba'ath party.

The confrontation with Israel was the pretext and excuse for a Martial law which gave unrestricted and unaccountable authority to the security services. Public debate was stifled. The mukhabarat had files on everybody and its agents operated in every school, university, workplace, village and town quarter. In 1977, the highest estimates for the intelligence services were about 50,000 agents for a population of 7.8 million. By comparison, in 1970, the US FBI had only 17,000 agents for a population of 220 million. By the 1990s it was reckoned that there were 100,000 full time members of the secret forces (by comparison, the Central Intelligence Agency has 21,000 employees), that means one for every 200 citizens.

== Symbols ==
=== Flag history ===
Flag of Ba'athist Syria
(1963–1972)

Flag of Ba'athist Syria in the Federation of Arab Republics
(1972–1980)

Flag of Ba'athist Syria
(1980–2024) (Note: The design was previously used as the Flag of the United Arab Republic (1958–1971).)

=== Emblem ===
Coat of arms of Ba'athist Syria
(1963–1972)

Coat of arms of Ba'athist Syria in the Federation of Arab Republics
(1972–1980)

Coat of arms of Ba'athist Syria
(1980–2024)

== See also ==
- Ba'athist Iraq
- Neo-Ba'athism
- Assad family
- Syrian civil war
