= Industry in Syria =

Syria has played an important and prominent role in the industrial progress for a long time because of the important geographical location and its mediation between the three continents, Europe, Asia and Africa, where the Syrian people were able to see the different nations, benefit and develop them. Therefore, Damascus is the most famous city for the endemicity of handicrafts that depend on individual skills. Industry has been a vital part of the Economy of Syria for many years. Major industries include; petroleum, textiles, food processing, beverages, tobacco, phosphate rock mining, cement, oil seeds crushing and car assembly.

Industry is the responsibility of the Ministry of Industry and has been heavily disrupted by the Syrian civil war.

== Agriculture ==
=== Cotton industry ===
Syria has produced cotton since ancient times, and its cultivation increased in importance in the 1950s and 1960s. Until superseded by petroleum in 1974, cotton was Syria's most important industrial and cash crop, and the country's most important foreign exchange earner, accounting for about one-third of Syria's export earnings. In 1976, the country was the tenth largest cotton producer in the world and the fourth largest exporter. Almost all the cotton was grown on irrigated land, largely in the area northeast of Aleppo. Syrian cotton was medium staple, similar to cotton produced in other developing countries had lower quality than the extra-long staple variety produced in Egypt. The cotton was handpicked, although mechanical pickers were tried in the 1970s in an attempt to hold down rising labor costs. Syria is currently 7% of the total global cotton production. By 2020, the industry returned to pre-war levels. In the COVID-19 pandemic in Syria, cotton face masks were being made.

== Financial services ==
Banking is regulated by the Ministry of Finance. As of 2018, there were 14 private banks, including three Islamic banks in Syria.

== Petroleum ==
According to the International Monetary Fund, before the Syrian Civil War, oil sales for 2010 were projected to generate $3.2 billion for the Syrian government and accounted for 25.1% of the state's revenue.
