= Geneva peace talks on Syria (2017) =

Geneva IV conference on Syria
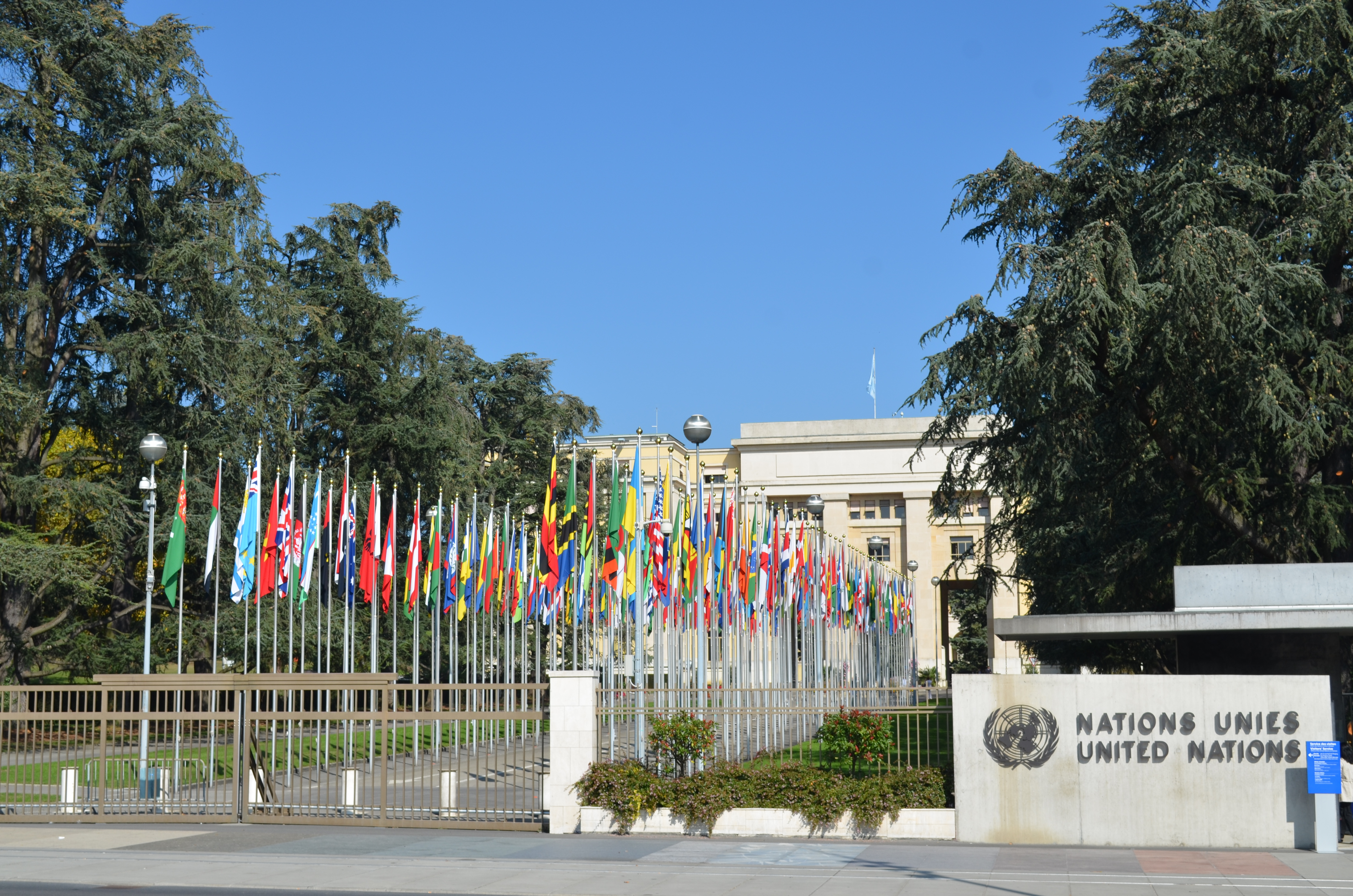
- The Palais des Nations (United Nations Office at Geneva) in October 2010.
- Genre: Peace conference
- Begins: 23 February 2017
- Ends: 3 March 2017; (1 week and 1 day)
- Locations: Montreux and Geneva
- Country: Switzerland
- Organizer: United Nations

The Geneva peace talks on Syria in 2017, also called the Geneva IV, V, VI, VII, & VIII talks, were peace negotiations between the Syrian government and the Syrian opposition under the auspices of the United Nations. The Geneva IV talks took place between 23 February and 3 March 2017, trying to resolve the Syrian Civil War. The Geneva VII talks began on 10 July 2017. The Geneva VIII talks were initially scheduled to begin on 28 November 2017.

The warring sides did not get to face-to-face negotiations, but for eight days no party walked away, while Russia talked with the parties separately.

== Preparations ==
On 1 February 2017, UN envoy Staffan de Mistura stated that the schedule for the Geneva IV conference on Syria will be moved from 8 to 20 February. He warned the Syrian opposition to select a delegation by 8 February, otherwise he would select them himself. The statement was quickly condemned by opposition representatives, including Riyad Farid Hijab, head of the High Negotiations Committee.

On 10 February, the Foreign Minister of Russia Sergey Lavrov called for a direct conference between the government and the opposition, in contrast with the indirect talks held in Astana, Kazakhstan from 23 to 24 January. He also called for the Democratic Union Party (PYD) to participate in the talks. This proposal was rejected by Turkey. On 12 February, 3 Kurdish National Council officials joined the 21-member National Coalition delegation headed by Nasr al-Hariri.

On 22 February, the day prior to the planned talks, Staffan de Mistura stated that the peace conference would be based on United Nations Security Council Resolution 2254. The resolution called for the end of attacks on civilians, the exclusion of the Islamic State of Iraq and the Levant and the al-Nusra Front, the establishment of a multiethnic society that include all religious and ethnic groups in Syria, the creation of a new constitution of Syria, and the conduction of a free and fair election within 18 months.

== Participants ==
- United Nations
  - UN envoy to Syria Staffan de Mistura
  - United Nations Security Council
  - International Syria Support Group
- Ba'athist Syria representative Bashar Jaafari
- High Negotiations Committee (21 members) – led by Nasr al-Hariri
  - National Coalition for Syrian Revolutionary and Opposition Forces
    - 3 Kurdish National Council delegates – Abdul Hakim Bashar, Fuad Aliko, and Hawas Sadoon
  - Al-Rahman Legion political leader Mutasim Shmeir
- 2 opposition groups based in Cairo and supported by Russia
  - "Cairo group" led by Jihad Makdissi
- Russian Special Envoy to Syria Alexander Lavrentiev

== Formal start of talks ==
The conference officially began on 23 February 2017. The Syrian opposition representatives arrived late due to disagreements between the various opposition blocs. The government and opposition delegates faced each other but did not directly speak to one another on the first day.

On 25 February, Tahrir al-Sham suicide bombers attacked the headquarters of the Syrian military intelligence in Homs, killing dozens of security forces, including the head of the military security in Homs. In response, the rebel-controlled neighbourhood of Waer was bombed by the Syrian Air Force, and more than 50 civilians were wounded. The UN condemned the attacks and called them "deliberate" attempts to stall the negotiations at Geneva.

== Formal conclusion of Geneva IV ==
The Geneva IV talks officially concluded on 3 March 2017. The talks achieved no breakthrough but concluded with an "agreed agenda" and both parties claimed small successes. Unlike previous, failed attempts, no delegation walked away during the conferences. The next round of talks in Astana was scheduled to be on 14 March, and the Geneva V conference would begin on 20 March. These newly planned talks would focus on a "political transition" in Syria.

== Aftermath ==
On 29 March 2017, the Kurdish National Council withdrew from the Syrian opposition's High Negotiations Committee in protest of the HNC's policies. An official in the Kurdish Unity Party, part of the KNC, stated that "The Syrian opposition are against federalism and constitutional Kurdish national rights, and they want to delay discussing Kurdish rights in the future." On 1 April, the KNC declared that all resolutions and documents resulting from further talks which the KNC will be absent from will be non-binding.
