= Syrian civil war ceasefires =

Attempts to broker ceasefires in the Syrian civil war

Several attempts were made to broker ceasefires in the Syrian Civil War.

== First partial ceasefire (26 February – July 2016) ==
Following talks in Munich, the world powers in the International Syria Support Group negotiated a ceasefire between the main parties to the war. On 22 February 2016 the United States and Russia announced the Terms for a Cessation of Hostilities in Syria, pledging "that the cessation of hostilities will be monitored in an impartial and transparent manner and with broad media coverage." On 26 February 2016, the United Nations Security Council unanimously adopted resolution 2268 that demanded all parties to comply with the terms of a U.S.-Russian deal on a "cessation of hostilities". The cease-fire started on 27 February 2016 at 00:00 (Damascus time). The ceasefire does not include attacks on UN-designated terrorist organizations such as the Islamic State of Iraq and the Levant and the al-Nusra Front. At the close of February 2016, despite individual clashes, the truce was reported to hold.

In early February 2016, the formal start of the UN-mediated Geneva Syria peace talks and the opposition's protestations notwithstanding, the Syrian government carried on with its offensive operations in the Aleppo Governorate amidst speculations that Turkey, as well as Saudi Arabia and the United Arab Emirates, were preparing a military incursion into Syria. The Saudi announcement was welcomed by the United States. Responding to the calls for Russia to stop bombing opposition forces in Syria now that the peace talks had started, Sergey Lavrov speaking in Muscat, Oman, said Russia would not stop its air strikes until Russia defeated "such terrorist organisations as Jabhat al-Nusra and ISIL″; he also stressed the imperative that Syria's border with Turkey be secured to prevent smuggling and the movement of militants. Syria′s deputy prime minister Walid Muallem said that any foreign country′s ground intervention in the Syrian territory without the government's approval would be deemed an act of aggression to be confronted: "Any aggressor will be sent back to their country in wooden boxes, whether they be Saudis or Turks."

On 11 February, it was confirmed that the Syrian Democratic Forces based in the town of Afrin, north-west of Aleppo, had taken a series of towns, including Deir Jamal and al-Qamiya, as well as a former Menagh Military Airbase near the border with Turkey, previously taken by rebels. In retaliation, on 13 February Turkey began a sustained campaign of shelling on SDF positions in the area of Azaz from its territory.

On 14 March 2016, Russian president Vladimir Putin announced that Russia would be pulling out the "main part" of its military in Syria. Putin also said that Russia's Khmeimim airbase will be kept to control the ceasefire agreements and that its port at Tartus would continue to operate as normal.

According to Western sources, Iran has kept only 700 IRGC advisors in Syria after the ceasefire, but this has not been confirmed. In mid-March, the Ground Forces of Islamic Republic of Iran Army indicated it would send Army commandos and snipers as military advisers to Syria and Iraq, the first formal acknowledgement by Iran of deployment of regular Iranian Army (as opposed to IRGC) forces outside Iran since the Iran–Iraq War of the 1980s.

Syrian government with support from Russian and Iranian forces successfully captured Palmyra from the ISIL by the end of March 2016.

FSA and allied Islamist groups captured al-Ra'i from ISIS on April 8. The capture of the town secured an important supply line for the rebels from Turkey near whose border the town is located. ISIL recaptured the town along with six villages on April 11.

By July 2016, this ceasefire had mostly unraveled and violence again escalated.

== Second ceasefire attempt (12 September – 19 September) ==
On 10 September 2016, Russia and U.S. reached a deal on establishing a cease fire between the Syrian Assad government and a US-supported coalition of so-called 'mainstream Syrian opposition rebel groups'.

This ceasefire was backed by the United States and Russia, with the understanding that – if it held for one week – Russia and the United States could begin to plan a joint mission against ISIS and al-Nusra. A notable loophole in the ceasefire meant that it did not apply to attacks against "terrorist targets" – the Russian government has used claims that it was targeting terrorist elements to justify airstrikes against rebel-held areas. The ceasefire went into effect on 12 September, but was poorly adhered to, with the Syrian government continuing bombing and UN humanitarian aid delayed by security concerns and the danger to convoys.

The ceasefire suffered a further set-back 17 September 2016, when a U.S.-British airstrike that they claimed was aimed at ISIL killed 60 Syrian government soldiers, and was on 19 September declared over by the Syrian government, after an airstrike by Syrian or Russian forces hit a Syrian Arab Red Crescent warehouse, killing 14 people and destroying 18 truckloads of food. On 3 October 2016, the U.S. announced suspension of talks with Russia on implementing the agreement, marking the definitive end of the ceasefire deal.

== Third ceasefire attempt (December 2016 – February 2017) ==
On 28 December 2016, talks between Turkey and Russia in Astana, Kazakhstan have resulted in the two states brokering a nationwide Syrian ceasefire that is due to begin at midnight on 30 December. The National Coalition for Syrian Revolutionary and Opposition Forces stated that it would abide with the truce. ISIL, the al-Nusra Front, and the YPG were excluded from the ceasefire, and the following rebel groups signed up for the truce:

- Sham Legion
- Ahrar al-Sham
- Jaysh al-Islam
- Free Idlib Army
- Levant Front
- Jabhat Ahl al-Sham
  - Army of Mujahideen

However, the Ahrar al-Sham spokesman denied having signed the deal.

Less than 2 hours after the ceasefire was due to be implemented, clashes erupted between the Army of Victory and government forces in the northern Hama Governorate. Rebel-held areas throughout the Idlib Governorate were also reportedly bombed.

On 31 December, several rebel groups declared the truce to be "null and void" if clashes continued.

On 2 January 2017, rebel groups said that they freeze talks about participation in peace conference due to ceasefire violations, referring to Wadi Barada offensive.

According to the United Nations on 6 January 2017, the ceasefire is "largely holding".

On 14 February 2017, the cease-fire between Assad forces and rebels collapsed throughout the country, leading to fresh clashes in various locations and a fresh rebel offensive in Daraa.

The third meeting of the Astana Process talks concluded in Astana on 25 March 2017. All parties that participated remained committed to the ceasefire agreement in place from the second round of Astana talks.

== Fourth ceasefire attempt (May 2017) ==
On 4 May 2017, Russia, Iran, and Turkey signed an agreement in Astana to create four "de-escalation zones" in Syria. The four zones include the Idlib Governorate, the northern rebel-controlled parts of the Homs Governorate, the rebel-controlled eastern Ghouta, and the Jordan–Syria border. The agreement was rejected by some rebel groups, and the Democratic Union Party also denounced the deal, saying that the ceasefire zones are "dividing Syria up on a sectarian basis". The ceasefire came into effect on 6 May.

== Fifth ceasefire attempt (July 2017 – November 2024) ==
On 9 July 2017, an open-ended cease-fire in southern Syria brokered by the United States, Russia, and Jordan went into effect. The ceasefire covered the governorates of Daraa, Suwayda and Quneitra. The deal was hailed as the first attempt by the U.S. Trump administration at peacemaking in the Syrian civil war.

According to 21 July 2017 report by Fox News, the ceasefire was mainly holding, albeit with flaws.

In early October 2017, Heather Nauert of U.S. Department of State said the ceasefire ″[wa]s still holding″.

The ceasefire collapsed in late November 2024 after the Southern Operations Room started an uprising in southern Syria and an offensive towards Damascus amidst the Syrian opposition offensives leading to the fall of the Assad regime.
