= Dima Moussa =

Syrian politician (born 1978)

- ديما موسى
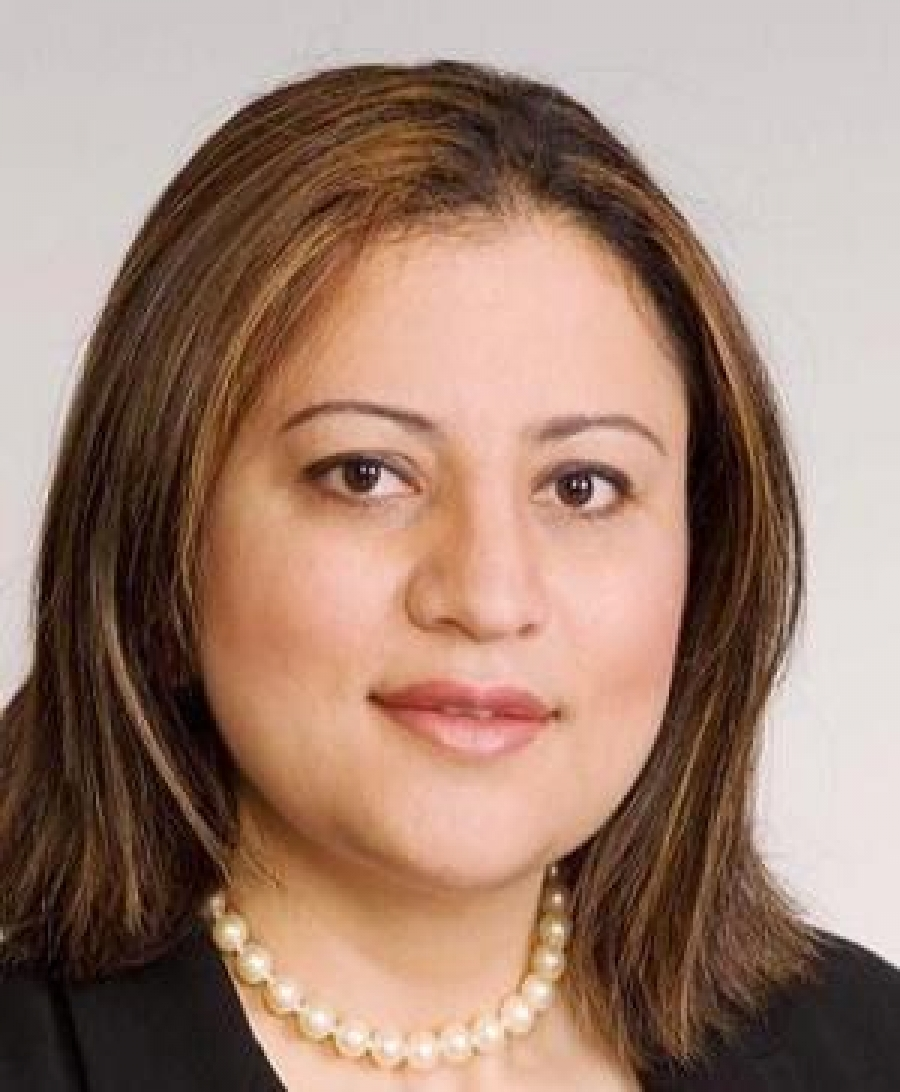
- Official portrait, 2012

Vice President of the National Coalition for Opposition and Revolutionary Forces of Syria
- In office 12 September 2023 – 12 February 2025
- President: Hadi al-Bahra
- In office 7 May 2018 – 1 July 2020
- President: Abdurrahman Mustafa

Personal details
- Born: 18 July 1978 (age 47) Aleppo, Syria
- Party: Independent
- Other political affiliations: Syrian National Coalition (2016–2025)
- Education: University of Illinois Urbana-Champaign (BS); DePaul University (JD)

Dima Moussa (Arabic: ديما موسى, romanized: Dīma Mūsā; born 18 July 1978) is a Syrian lawyer and politician who served as Vice President of the National Coalition of Syrian Revolutionary and Opposition Forces from 2018 to 2020 and from 2023 to 2025. A founding member of the Syrian Women's Political Movement, Moussa has focused on promoting political inclusion, gender equality, and democratic reforms.

== Early life and education ==
Dima Moussa was born in Aleppo in 1978 to Naim, an electrical engineer, and Margaret; she has one brother. Although born in Aleppo, her family’s roots are in Homs. Moussa comes from a Syriac Orthodox Christian background. In the mid‑1990s, when she was 15, her immediate family left Syria, citing political conditions under President Hafez al‑Assad. Relatives remained in Homs until 2012, when government operations during the Syrian civil war forced them to flee.

Moussa earned a bachelor’s degree in electrical engineering from the University of Illinois at Urbana–Champaign and later received a Juris Doctor from DePaul University.

== Career ==
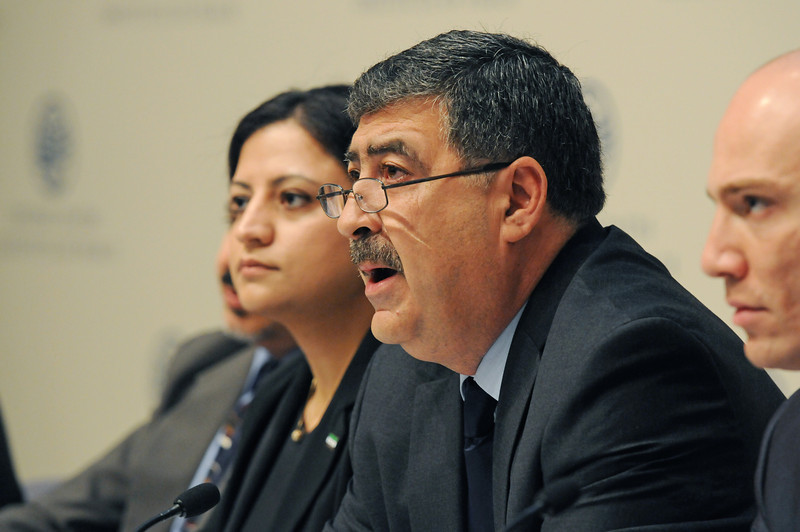
Moussa with Murhaf Jouejati and Ausama Monajed at the United States Institute of Peace in October 2011

Dima Moussa is a U.S.-licensed attorney and practiced law in the United States until late 2012. She is often identified as a liberal feminist, with a particular focus on women's rights and democratic reform in the Arab world. While studying law, Moussa volunteered with the Human Rights Law Institute at DePaul University from 2005 to 2006, concentrating on the legal status and rights of Arab women.

Following the outbreak of the Syrian revolution in 2011, Moussa became involved with Syrian activist networks and joined the opposition movement later that year. She served as a spokesperson for the Revolutionary Council of Homs, a coalition of local political and civil society actors working against the Assad regime.

Moussa was a founding member of the Syrian National Council. In 2014, she represented the Homs Quarters Union, an activist group that highlighted humanitarian concerns during the Siege of Homs. She publicly documented deteriorating living conditions and alleged human rights violations, noting the prolonged absence of humanitarian aid since December 2012.

Moussa joined the National Coalition for Syrian Revolutionary and Opposition Forces in October 2016. A strong advocate for women’s rights and political representation, she became a founding member of the Syrian Women’s Political Movement in October 2017, serving as a member of its General Secretariat from its inception until mid-2020.

In March 2018, Moussa participated in the Conscience Convoy, an international initiative that aimed to raise awareness about the plight of Syrian women detained by the Assad regime. On International Women’s Day the same year, she called on women worldwide to participate in sit-ins to protest human rights violations against Syrian women, citing a pattern of murder, detention, abduction, and rape under the Syrian government.

In May 2018, Moussa was elected Vice President of the Syrian National Coalition, alongside Abdel Basset Hamo and Bader Jamous, during the presidency of Abdurrahman Mustafa. She held the position for two consecutive terms, serving until July 2020.

Moussa also played a key role in opposition advocacy related to Law No. 10, a controversial property rights law issued by the Assad government in 2018, which critics argued could be used to dispossess refugees and prevent their return. She participated in awareness campaigns on the issue and stated that the law demonstrated the regime's lack of commitment to a genuine political transition.

In September 2019, Moussa was appointed as a member of the drafting group of the Syrian Constitutional Committee, an initiative aimed at negotiating a new Syrian constitution under the auspices of the United Nations.

== Personal life ==
Dima Moussa is multilingual, speaking Arabic, English, and Assyrian.
