= United Nations Security Council Resolution 2268 =

UN Security Council Resolution 2268
- Date: 26 February 2016
- Meeting no.: 7634
- Code: S/RES/2268 (Document)
- Subject: Cessation of hostilities pact in Syria
- Voting summary: 15 voted for; None voted against; None abstained; None absent
- Result: Adopted

Security Council composition
- Permanent members: China; France; Russia; United Kingdom; United States
- Non-permanent members: Angola; Egypt; Japan; Malaysia; New Zealand; Senegal; Spain; Ukraine; Uruguay; Venezuela

The United Nations Security Council Resolution 2268 was unanimously adopted on 26 February 2016. It is calling for a cessation of hostilities and a grant for access to humanitarian workers in Syria.

== The resolution ==
The resolution endorsed the Joint Statement of the United States and the Russia of 22 February 2016 on "cessation of hostilities" and demanded all parties to whom the cessation of hostilities applied to fulfil their commitments thereunder, as well as "the full and immediate implementation of resolution 2254 (2015) to facilitate a Syrian-led and Syrian-owned political transition, in accordance with the Geneva communiqué as set forth in the ISSG Statements".
