= Jihad Makdissi =

Syrian Foreign Ministry spokesman from 1998 to 2012

Jihad Makdissi or Jay Makdissi (Arabic: جهاد مقدسي) was the Foreign Ministry spokesman of the Syrian government from 1998 to 2012. He is a member of Syria's Catholic minority and is fluent in English and French.

Makdissi graduated from Al-Nour high school in Damascus and studied in Paris at the ENA. He received his master's degree in Diplomacy and International Relations in 2009 from the University of Westminster and his doctorate from the unaccredited American University of London in Media Studies in 2011. Prior to becoming official spokesman, he had worked for five years in Syria's London embassy.

On 2 December 2012, it was rumoured that he had been sacked from his position and left for the United Kingdom. Subsequently, additional rumours circulated stating that Makdissi had not been sacked but had instead defected. Al Arabiya News reported that a Syrian government spokesman had stated that he was on three months agreed leave while Hezbollah stated that he had been dismissed for "improvising statements" and Al-Manar TV reported that he was fired for straying from the official positions of the Syrian Government. In late December 2012, it was reported that Makdissi had fled to the United States.

On 30 January 2013, it was reported on Asharq Al-Awsat that he had not defected to the United States or Britain, as had previously been reported, but rather travelled to visit his family in Lebanon and from there defected to one of the Gulf states (Abu Dhabi in the UAE), where he had arranged for residency for himself, his wife and his children. He was also reported to have launched his own private consultancy firm there.

Makdissi issued a press release mid-February 2013 in which he stated that he had resigned because of Syria's "violence and polarization that left no place for moderation and diplomacy" and apologized to Syrian families if they had thought that he had not understood their suffering while in his diplomatic position.

Makdissi gave a lengthy interview to The New York Times in January 2014 in which he talked about his political position as a Syrian Christian and independent politician. He said that a diplomat should serve his country and is not a lawyer who can accept any case, so when things headed towards an armed conflict with no more room for politics, he refused to be an advocate for one side and the diplomat inside of him won over. He also made it clear that he is an independent politician who believes in and works for a peaceful political solution in Syria and that he is a strong supporter of the Geneva platform and process.

Makdissi gave another lengthy interview on 9 February 2016 for a Syrian opposition news site (The New Syrian) where he spoke for the very first time about his resignation and his political affiliation as independent member of the Cairo Conference for the Syrian Opposition and how he has been working for political transition in Syria based on the Geneva Process, Vienna Document and UN Security Council Resolution 2254. He said that the Syrian government never considered giving any real political concession to absorb the growing uprising in the street and the last serious initiative that was presented by the regime is the SAHARA conference in 2012. He stressed that Syrian Christians are among the founding fathers of Syria and not second-class citizens, and that they would continue to be the glue of the Syrian society; he also believes they can play the role of the bridge among other major sects in Syria. He stressed that there is no military solution in Syria and the only permissible way is a negotiated settlement and that an understanding among international powers, especially Russia and the USA, is a must to achieve such a transition.
