= Syrian Constitutional Committee =

United Nations-facilitated constituent assembly process

Syrian Constitutional Committee اللجنة الدستورية السورية
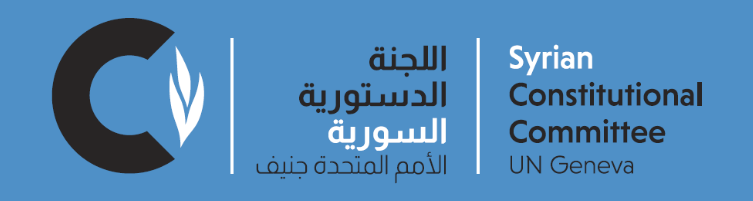

Type
- Type: Unicameral

History
- Founded: September 23, 2019
- Disbanded: December 2024 (De facto, after the fall of the Assad regime)

Leadership
- Co-Chair (Government): Ahmad Kuzbari
- Co-Chair (Opposition): Hadi al-Bahra

Structure
- Seats: 150
- Political groups: Nominated by the Syrian Government: 50 seats Nominated by the UN to represent civil society: 50 seats Nominated by the Syrian Opposition: 50 seats
- Committees: Small body
- Length of term: No term length

Elections
- Voting system: Nomination by the three parties
- Last election: 23 September 2019

Meeting place
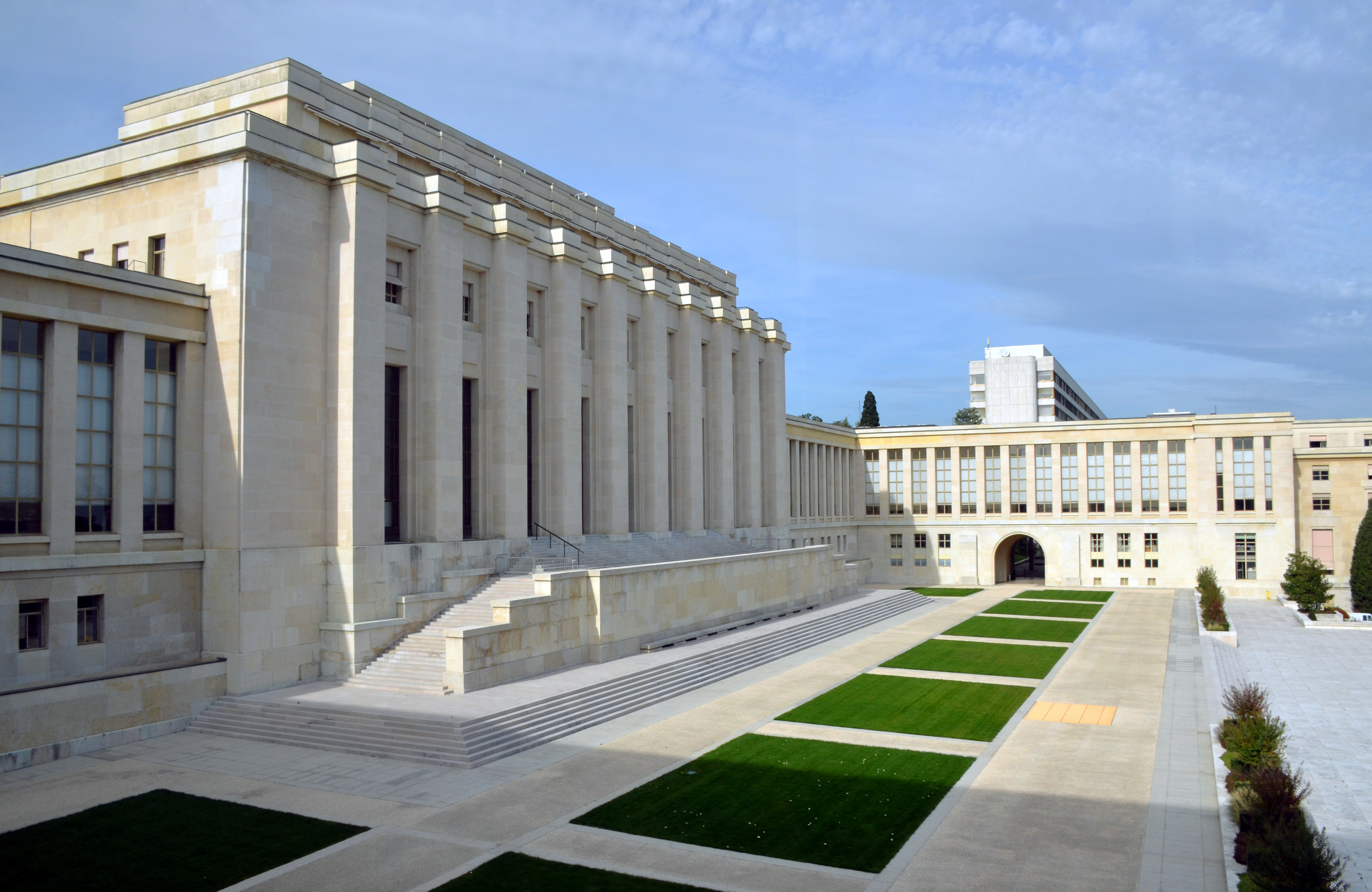
- United Nations Office at Geneva

Website
- www.unog.ch/syria

The Syrian Constitutional Committee was a United Nations-facilitated constituent assembly process that sought, in the context of the Syrian civil war, to reconcile the Ba'athist regime of President Bashar al-Assad and the Syrian opposition, by amending the current or adopting a new Constitution of Syria. The UN hopes that this would lead to negotiations which would subsequently lead to a peaceful end of the conflict, which had been raging for more than eight years by the time of the committee's formation. The Constitutional Committee was formed with the formal approval of both parties involved—namely the Government of the Syrian Arab Republic and the Syrian Negotiation Commission representing the opposition, with the facilitation of the United Nations.

It was described by UN Secretary-General António Guterres as part of a "Syrian-owned and Syrian-led" peace process. The decisions it took were not binding under Syrian law and the committee relies on the good faith of both parties for their implementation. The committee was also not bound by any deadlines or timetables.

The Committee had achieved no results by the time Assad was overthrown in December 2024. After Assad’s fall, the new Syrian president, Ahmed al-Sharaa, set up a domestic advisory committee that drafted a Constitutional Declaration of the Syrian Arab Republic.

== Origins ==
The proposal for the creation of a committee to amend Syria's constitution can be traced back to United Nations Security Council Resolution 2254, which was adopted in December 2015. The resolution provided a framework for the creation of such a committee, but its implementation was delayed until after the Geneva peace talks on Syria and then later delayed until a rough framework agreement was reached in Russia in January 2018.

The formation of the committee was delayed numerous times, as both sides strongly disagreed on its composition and as the armed conflict continued throughout the negotiations.

By the time the committee's composition was agreed upon, the Syrian Government had managed to gain control of the majority of the country's territory through military means. But millions of Syrians have been forcibly displaced, with about half of Syria's pre-war population living outside of the country.

Even as the committee's membership list neared its final draft, arguments emerged over which members should be picked to 'represent civil society' – as both the Syrian Government and Opposition attempted to influence the selection of the figures from the UN's list. The Constitutional Committee, including a package agreement on the Terms of Reference and Core Rules of Procedure of, and nominees to the Constitutional Committee was finalized to on 23 September 2019 after a meeting between UN envoy Geir Pedersen and Syrian Foreign Minister Walid Muallem, and after consultations with the opposition.

The Constitutional Committee was convened by and is facilitated by the UN Special Envoy for Syria Geir Otto Pedersen, a Norwegian diplomat, who noted that the committee was the "first concrete political agreement between the Government and the Opposition to begin to implement a key aspect of Security Council resolution 2254 – to set a schedule and process for a new constitution".

== History of committee process ==
=== Inaugural meeting ===
The large body of the committee met for the first time on 30 October 2019, at 12:00 local time at the United Nations Office at Geneva.

The Co-Chair nominated by the Syrian Government, Ahmad Kuzbari, lamented "terrorism" and hailed the "sacrifices and heroic deeds" of the Syrian Army during his inaugural speech. The opposition-nominated Co-Chair, Hadi al-Bahra, stated that it was time for them to "believe [that] victory in Syria is achieving justice and peace not winning the war". The two co-chairs did not shake hands at the end of the 45-minute opening ceremony.

The first meeting of the 45-member small body took place on 4 November and lasted for four hours. The body decided to hold subsequent 4-hour sessions daily for two weeks. The meeting was described as "positive" and "successful".

=== First session and initial proposals ===
In its first days, the Committee managed to agree on a "code of conduct" for its members – which bound them to work with a "spirit of respect, cooperation and good faith", avoid any actions which might harm other members, as well as refrain from distributing any documents from within the plenary room as "official papers". The code of conduct, however, was made between the two Co-Chairs representing the Syrian Government and Opposition respectively, and not voted on by the whole body of the committee.

The Syrian Opposition focused its efforts on a return to an amended version of Syria's 1950 constitutional charter, which would considerably limit the powers of the Syrian Presidency, instead empowering a prime ministerial post. These efforts were rebuked by the Syrian Government, which flatly denied the proposal.

Proposals given before the committee included the recognition of the Kurdish language as a secondary language, as well as dropping the word "Arab" from Syria's official name – the "Syrian Arab Republic". Proposals aimed at bolstering the role of Kurds in Syria were strongly opposed by Turkey, which was expected to influence the opposition's delegates into voting down any proposal it deemed out of line.

=== Second session and deadlock ===
The second session of the Committee ended in late November 2019 without agreement, as the two sides did not meet each other after failing to agree on an agenda for the session.

The Syrian government delegation had presented an agenda of what it dubbed "national pillars of the Syrian people", which rejected foreign, especially Turkish involvement in the Syrian Civil War, called for the lifting on the sanctions against Syria and condemned the armed rebel groups in Syria as terrorists. The opposition delegation rejected this proposal and accused the government delegation of attempting to sabotage the committee's work.

The opposition's delegation instead presented five proposals, mostly aimed at changing the preamble and principles of Syria's constitution. The government delegation rejected these proposals, stating that they would refuse to accept constitutional proposals before the committee accepts a statement of values, which it opines ought to condemn foreign involvement.

The government delegation then presented a proposal that suggested a meeting of the full committee and a discussion of the proposals presented by each member. This was also rejected by the opposition's delegation, with the opposition co-chair Hadi Al Bahra stating that they were "not in a cultural forum to have dialogue and discussions while explosive barrels are falling".

The Syrian opposition blamed the failure to agree to an agenda on the Syrian government for introducing what they deemed were "irrelevant" proposals to the committee, while the government delegation blamed the opposition for refusing to enter the meeting room.

Following these developments, the meeting was called off. UN Envoy Geir Otto Pedersen stated that no date had been set for a future meeting of the committee.

The Northwestern Syria offensive (November 2019–present) between the government and opposition forces began in parallel to the breakdown of talks at the constitutional committee.

A month later, in December 2019, Pedersen spoke before the UN Security Council, describing the situation as "protracted" and "deadlocked" and urged the two sides to agree to an agenda, stating that without such there would be no reason for the committee to meet for a third time.

The opposition HNC's Chairman, Nasr al-Hariri, stated in an interview to Asharq Al-Awsat in later December that the opposition would not enter into any talks with the government delegation before an agenda is set. He accused the Syrian government of failing the negotiations by not agreeing to their proposed agenda.

=== August 2020 session ===
A third session of negotiations, among the 45-member small body, with 15 members from the government, opposition, and civil society, respectively, started in late August 2020, with a break of several days due to some members testing positive for SARS-CoV-2. Pedersen stated that he had "received a 'strong signal of support' from 'key international players' and from "all sides in the Constitutional Committee" for the continuation of the peace process. Anadolu Agency interpreted the "international players" to refer to Iran, Russia, Turkey and the US. Hadi al-Bahra, one of the opposition leaders, and Ahmad Kuzbari, on behalf of the Syrian government, were co-chairs of the session.

=== October 2021 session ===
On 22 October 2021, yet another round of peace talks failed to reach common ground. No date for the next round was determined.

=== March 2022 session ===
On 21 March 2022, the seventh meeting began. Emphasis was placed on four areas of constitutional principles: governance, state identity, state symbols, and the regulation and function of public authorities. The talks ended with some amendments on select pieces of presented text.

=== May 2022 session ===
On 30 May 2022, the eighth meeting began. Although some agreement was achieved on vague common points, the talks were largely dominated by disagreements on the military's role in the transfer of power, imposed sanctions, returning refugee rights, human rights, war criminal accountability, military restructuring, and the hierarchy of international agreements and the constitution, and others.

Pedersen noted progress in the types of discussion even though no agreed upon content was produced. He also stated that the discussions could take years to resolve and that the committee had tacitly agreed to speed up the pace of work and achieve results.

=== January 2023 session ===
On 17 July 2022 the ninth session, which had been planned to take place from 25–29 July, was placed on hold and delayed indefinitely for unclear reasons.

On 29 November 2022, following a briefing to the United Nations Security Council, Pedersen expressed his hope that the following session would be held in January 2023. In response to questions about the effect of the Russian invasion of Ukraine on the Syrian Constitutional Committee, Pedersen referred to an "issue" from Russian representatives in accepting Geneva as the venue for the proposed January 2023 session.

== Composition ==
=== Large body ===
The whole committee itself, referred to as the large body and sometimes also dubbed the expanded body, is composed of three groups of 50 members each, where the first group is directly nominated by Bashar al-Assad's government. The second is directly nominated by the Syrian Opposition's High Negotiations Committee and the third includes figures of Syrian civil society, selected by the United Nations.

Nearly 30% of all members of the committee are women and seven members are Syrian Kurds. The committee's delegates included members of the People's Council of Syria, university rectors and journalists. Both the Syrian government and opposition intentionally avoided nominating senior political figures as representatives, so as to prevent previous conflicts from hampering the committee's work.

The committee is headed by two equal co-chairs – one nominated by the Syrian Government and the other by the Syrian opposition. They are aided by Geir Pedersen, a UN official who succeeded Staffan De Mistura, Lakhdar Brahimi, and Kofi Annan, as the envoy of the UN's political efforts in Syria.

==== Government quota ====
Ahmad al-Kuzbari, a member of the Syrian People's Council, was selected by the Syrian Government as the Co-Chair of the Committee. Al-Kuzbari remarked that he hoped that the next session of the committee would be held not in Geneva, but in Damascus.

Syrian President Bashar al-Assad stated before state media that his government was not a direct part of the Committee, but that the government delegation represented its view. The highest-ranked government official in the delegation was Ahmed Faruk Arnus, an aide to Syria's Foreign Minister Walid Muallem. No other senior government officials were included in the delegation.

The delegation itself, which refers to itself as the "government-backed delegation", is focused around issues surrounding support for Syria's national sovereignty, as well as its state and military institutions. The delegation is also opposed to Western-backed sanctions against the nation.

==== UN quota ====
The UN quota was reportedly picked from members from diverse religious, ethnic and geographical backgrounds, with nearly half of its members being women. The members nominated to fill this quota were selected by UN envoy for the Syrian conflict Geir Pedersen.

==== Opposition quota ====
The opposition quota, formally appointed by the High Negotiations Committee is reportedly split into different factions.

Turkey was found to have the most influence over the opposition's delegation, playing a role in the selection of over 20 of the opposition's 50 total representatives. Seventeen of those 20 allegedly influenced by Ankara lived in Turkey at the time of the inauguration of the Committee. Some of the opposition representatives are members of the Turkish-backed Free Syrian Army.

Russia had the second largest degree of influence over the opposition's delegation – with 7 of the 50 opposition delegates having links to Moscow. Of those seven, 5 are members of the "Moscow Platform", which unlike almost all other opposition factions, does not demand the end of Bashar al-Assad's term as President of Syria.

Five members of the opposition delegation are closely aligned to the "Cairo platform" made up by secularist individuals of various ideologies, influenced by Egypt – a country with close links to the Syrian Government.

Six are members of the National Coordination Committee for Democratic Change – a coalition of secular left-wing parties representing Syria's non-violent "internal" opposition and often described as Syria's "most moderate opposition group". The NCC is tolerated by the Syrian Government and operates openly within Syria, but is sometimes accused of being a front organization for the Syrian Government by several armed opposition groups, which the non-violent NCC has refused to endorse.

The main leaders of the opposition's delegations, such as Ahmad Tu'mah and designated Committee Co-Chair Hadi al-Bahra, rejected affiliations to any group and instead defined themselves as "pragmatists" – seeing the "Russian-dominated" peace process as the only path left for the Syrian Opposition, seeking to eke out political concessions as the prospect of a government overthrow grew far away. The two represented the highest-ranking opposition members in the delegation, with other senior opposition representatives that had previously headed talks, such as Ahmad Jarba, Nasr al-Hariri and Riyad Hijab, being absent from the opposition's delegation.

=== Small body ===
The small body, also sometimes described as the mini-committee, is a cut-down version of the large body, analogous to a parliamentary committee, with 15 members from each of the large body's groups.

== Committee structure ==
=== Legislative procedure ===
All proposals must first be introduced in the small body of the committee. If a draft proposal is accepted by the small body, it is then passed on for voting in the large body. A proposal is only considered adopted if it is accepted by both bodies.

Any decision of both the large or small body may only pass if it has the support of a supermajority consisting of 75% of the respective body's members. The committee is, however, instructed to make decisions by consensus where possible.

If the committee manages to draft a full new Syrian constitution, it would then be put to a UN-monitored referendum for approval by the Syrian people.

The Constitutional Committee has no formal legal status within Syria. The decisions taken by it are not binding in Syrian law, as the formation of the Committee is not in line with the process of constitutional amendment set out by the current Constitution of Syria. Furthermore, the Committee also lacks a legal mandate over the Syrian Opposition. Owing to these facts, it remains to be seen whether either party will actually respect the decisions of the committee.

=== Disputes ===
The High Negotiations Committee is the body selected to represent the Syrian opposition. While including members of the Syrian National Coalition and of the National Coordination Committee for Democratic Change as well as representatives of armed factions such as the Free Syrian Army, it leaves many other anti-government groups in Syria completely unrepresented in the committee. Despite the inclusion of seven total ethnic Kurds in the committee, the mostly neutral Autonomous Administration of North and East Syria as well as its Kurdish-led, majority-Arab military wing – the Syrian Democratic Forces, is also left completely unrepresented. Hayat Tahrir al-Sham, a group originally linked to Al-Qaeda and designated by the UN as a terrorist organization, as well as Syria's largest rebel group, was excluded from the negotiations for the formation of the committee from its inception.

The object of the committee's work is also called into question by both sides. The Syrian Government's delegation asserts that the committee's work should be focused on amending the current Syrian Constitution, which was adopted in 2012, while the opposition delegates insist on creating an entirely new constitution.

== Analysis of committee processes ==
The launch of the committee was met with skepticism by political analysts, who noted both the lack of good faith between the Syrian Government and Opposition, as well as the government's recent territorial gains as factors that might prevent the committee from fulfilling its stated objective.

Patrick Wintour commented for The Guardian that the 75% supermajority rule had drawn criticism as it was seen by some as a "recipe for paralysis".

Enab Baladi noted that the committee was unlikely to lead to peace, as large groups, such as Rojava are excluded from the peace process, while parts of the Syrian Opposition itself have condemned it entirely. They also noted that the committee faces criticism for the non-elected nature of its members and also that the committee itself might be "unconstitutional", as it falls outside the rules set out by the current Constitution of Syria for constitutional amendments, which renders its decisions legally non-binding in Syria.

Analysts mostly agree that the lack of a binding timetable, the recent military defeats suffered by the opposition, as well as the divisions within the opposition delegation itself give the upper hand to the Syrian Government and its delegation.

According to Sami Moubayed writing in The Arab Weekly, should the drafting process continue into 2021, any term limits imposed by a new or amended constitution on the Presidency would only take effect as of 2028 – after the President has completed his full seven-year term.

== Reactions ==
=== International organization ===
- United Nations – The UN described the launch of the committee as a "sign of hope" for ending the Syrian civil war.

=== National ===
- (Ba'athist Syria) Syrian government – Syrian Foreign Minister Walid Muallem stated that the Syrian Government was "committed to a political process to end the more than eight-year crisis". Syrian state broadcaster SANA described the foreign minister's meeting with UN authorities as "constructive and positive". Syrian President Bashar al-Assad vowed to accept any decision reached by the Constitutional Committee, so long as that decision was "in line with our [Syria's] national interest". He added that the committee had "nothing to do" with the upcoming Elections in Syria, which he stated would still be held under the auspices of the Syrian state.
- Russia – Russia supported the formation of the committee, dubbing its launch as a "victory".
- Iran – Iran voiced its support for the agreement, with Iranian Foreign Minister Javad Zarif stating that he had always thought that the end of the Syrian Conflict would come through a political solution and added that the committee would have Iran's full support.
- Turkey – Turkish Foreign Minister Mevlüt Çavuşoğlu supported the agreement, stating that Turkey "emphasized the importance of the need to deal with humanitarian issues throughout the whole [Syrian] territory".
- France – The French Foreign Ministry expressed its support for what it deemed to be the "relaunch of political regulation in Syria under the auspices of the UN".
- On 2 November, the Foreign Ministers of Saudi Arabia, Egypt, France, Germany, Jordan, the United Kingdom and the United States issued a joint statement in which they praised the efforts of UN Secretary-General António Guterres and UN Syria Envor Geir Pedersen for the establishment of the committee, which they dubbed a "positive step".

=== Syrian Opposition ===
- Syrian Opposition – The High Negotiations Committee's spokesman described the committee as a "logical thing", which would create a "secure environment" for the drafting of a new constitution. He further dubbed it "a critical turning point" in the achievement of a political solution.

The Syrian Network for Human Rights condemned the formation of the committee, stating that they believed it "violated and contravened international law".

Syrian dissident Anwar al-Bunni condemned the committee, dubbing it as a "pretext to fulfill a military agenda on the ground".

Various opposition groups criticised the opposition's representatives to the council on social media, dubbing them "unrepresentative" or "unqualified", while others dismissed the committee entirely, calling it a "futile endeavor", which would only "buy time" for the Syrian Government to start a new military offensive against the opposition.

The Suqour al-Sham Brigades and the remnants of the Nour al-Din al-Zenki Movement both condemned the formation of the committee and stated that they will boycott its decisions.

=== Other non-state groups ===
- Autonomous Administration of North and East Syria – AANES officials condemned the fact that they were excluded from the peace talks and stated that "having a couple of Kurds" in the committee did not mean that the Syrian Kurds were properly represented in it. The co-chair of the Syrian Democratic Council accused Turkey of vetoing the representation of Syrian Kurds within the committee. The Kurdish-led administration also organized demonstrations in front of the UN office in Qamishli to protest their exclusion from the committee.

== See also ==
=== Events within Syrian society ===
- Timeline of the Syrian civil war
- Control of cities during the Syrian civil war
- 2011 Syrian Revolution

=== Peace efforts and civil society groups ===
- Syrian civil war ceasefires
- Syrian diaspora
- Syrian Observatory for Human Rights
- White Helmets (Syrian civil war)
