= Syrian Negotiation Commission =

Syrian political body

- Abbreviation: SNC
- Merged into: Syrian caretaker government
- Formation: 10 December 2015 (10 years ago)
- Dissolved: 12 February 2025 (17 months ago)
- Headquarters: Riyadh
- Location: Saudi Arabia
- Region served: Syria
- Chairman/president: Bader Jamous
- Affiliations: Syrian National Coalition; Syrian Interim Government
- Website: snc-sy.org

The Syrian Negotiation Commission (SNC; Arabic: هيئة التفاوض السورية), known before 2017 as the High Negotiations Committee (الهيئة العليا للمفاوضات) was an umbrella political body which represented the broadest spectrum of Syrian opposition in the negotiations to end the Syrian civil war. The Syrian Negotiation Commission's mandate was to negotiate with the Ba'athist regime within UN-sponsored pathways as part of the Syrian peace process. Its last chairman was Bader Jamous.

== History ==
In December 2015, various Syrian opposition forces convened Riyadh I Conference in Saudi Arabia. It was attended by around 150 opposition figures and the formation of the High Negotiations Committee (HNC) was declared at the end of the conference.

In December 2015, the Security Council issued resolution no. 2254 which provided for launching formal negotiations between representatives of the Syrian opposition and of the regime in order to reach a durable political settlement and establish a credible, inclusive and non-sectarian governing body, adopting a pathway for the drafting of a new constitution for Syria and holding free elections under UN auspices. The United Nations then officially recognized the HNC as the sole representative of the Syrian opposition in the Geneva peace talks in 2016. Its first leader was Riyad Farid Hijab, who was Prime Minister of Syria from June to August 2012. The HNC was then considered to be Syria's main or broadest opposition bloc.

The group's chief negotiator, Mohammed Alloush, a member of Jaish al-Islam, resigned from the HNC in May 2016 because of the lack of progress in the Syrian peace process.

In September 2016, the HNC set out a detailed transition plan for Syria, committing the country to democratic and religious pluralism. The 25-page document was launched in London and was welcomed by the United Kingdom's government.

In January 2017, the HNC announced that it will support the Syrian peace talks in Astana, which began on 23 January.

In February 2017, the HNC chief coordinator Riyad Farid Hijab rejected a statement by Staffan de Mistura that the latter will select delegates for the Syrian opposition in Geneva. He also objected to the participation Democratic Union Party (PYD) in the Geneva conference.

The HNC, led by Nasr al-Hariri, participated in the 2017 Geneva peace talks.

In 2017, the HNC was renamed as the Syrian Negotiation Commission when it was expanded to include members from the "Moscow" and "Cairo" groups of the Syrian opposition.

== Composition ==
In December 2015, the High Negotiations Committee included 33 committee members from the following political and military opposition organizations:

- 9 members of the National Coalition of Syrian Revolutionary and Opposition Forces (also known as the Syrian National Coalition)
  - Kurdish National Council (2015-2017)
- 5 members of National Coordination Committee for Democratic Change
- 9 independent oppositional figures:
  - Louai Hussein, who heads the Building the Syrian State Movement
  - Ahmad Jarba, a former National Coalition president
- 11 members of militant rebel factions:
  - Free Syrian Army
    - Southern Front
    - 2nd Coastal Division
      - Mount Turkmen Battalion
    - Mountain Hawks Brigade
  - Ahrar al-Sham
  - Jaysh al-Islam
  - Ajnad al-Sham Islamic Union

The SNC comprised 37 members representing six components

- 8 from the National Coalition of Revolution and Opposition Forces
- 5 from the National Coordination Body for Democratic Change Forces
- 4 from Cairo Platform
- 4 from Moscow Platform
- 7 from military factions
- 8 independents
- 1 from the Kurdish National Council

The SNC launched the Executive Framework for a Political Solution in Syria. It held that a political solution must be based on Geneva Communique

and UNSCRs 2118 and 2254 which provide for the establishment of a transitional governing body with full executive powers.

The SNC then took part in the UN-sponsored Geneva III and Geneva IV negotiations. The SNC also sent an advisory delegation to Astana I negotiations which were held under the auspices of Russia and Türkiye as guarantors.

In February 2017, the fourth round of Geneva negotiations were held and the UN Special Envoy to Syria presented four baskets to negotiate, namely:

- Establishment of credible, inclusive and non-sectarian governance
- Drafting a new constitution
- Holding free and fair elections pursuant to a new constitution
- Counter terrorism.

In November 2017, the SNC held Riyadh II Conference in which it discussed expanding the SNC to broaden representation and involve more national figures in the SNC particularly from inside Syria and increasing women representation.

The SNC asserted that its mandate was to negotiate with the regime to realize a democratic political transition through the establishment of a transitional governing body capable of preparing a safe and neutral environment within which the transitional process proceeds in accordance with international resolutions.

In September 2019, the UN Secretary General announced the establishment of the Syrian Constitutional Committee. The Large Body of the Constitutional Committee comprised 150 members divided equally on the three parties: the SNC, the Ba'athist regime and civil society.

== Geneva II ==
Geneva II Conference for Peace in Syria (or simply Geneva II) was a UN-backed international conference held in Geneva with the aim of ending the conflict in Syria, by bringing together the Syrian government and the Syrian opposition.

== Geneva III ==
Syrian peace talks in Geneva, also known as Geneva III, were peace negotiations between the Syrian government and opposition in Geneva under the auspices of the UN and the Vienna peace talks group on Syria and the UN Security Council.

== Geneva IV ==
The Geneva IV peace talks on Syria were peace negotiations between the Syrian government and the Syrian opposition under the auspices of the United Nations.

== Geneva VIII ==
The last round of Geneva talks, also known as Geneva VIII, was held in November 2017 and was concluded on 15 December when then UN Special Envoy to Syria, Staffan De Mistura, declared that “negotiations, in reality, in the end, did not take place”

== Post-Assad period ==
On February 12, 2025, two months after the fall of the Assad regime, the Commission's president Bader Jamous met new Syrian president Ahmed al-Sharaa, together with Hadi al-Bahra, president of the Syrian National Coalition. It was agreed that the Negotiation Commission and the National Coalition would both dissolve within the new Syrian authorities.
