= Elections in Syria =

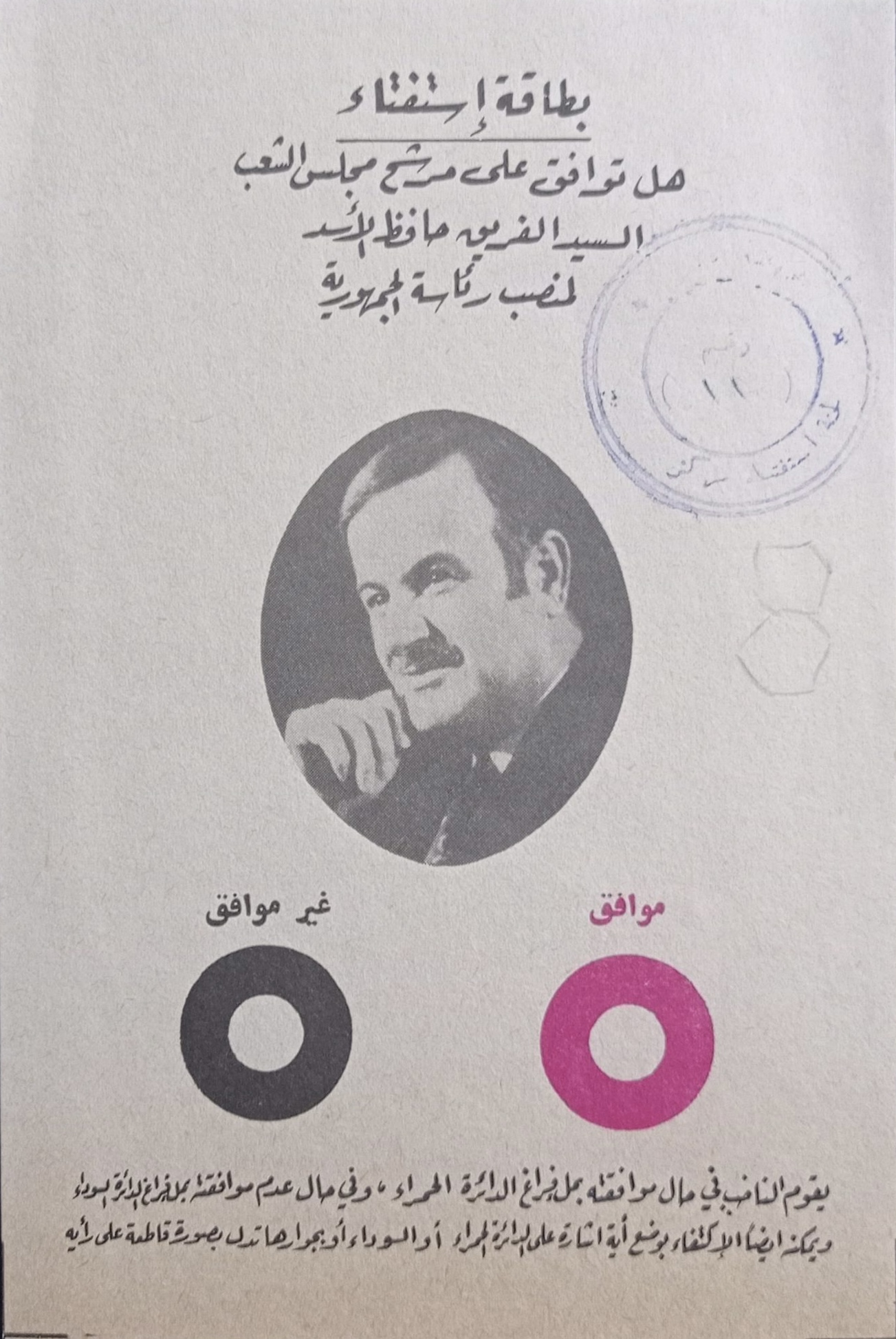
Card of the referendum to elect Hafez al-Assad (who became the longest-serving leader of Syria) as president, year 1971.

Elections in Syria are conducted for the presidency and parliament, and have been held since Syrian independence in 1946. Beginning in 2011, the country became embroiled in the Syrian civil war, culminating in the fall of the Assad regime on December 8, 2024. Since then, the country has been led by the Syrian transitional government, with president Ahmed al-Sharaa confirming elections will be held within 4-5 years.

== Early independence ==
During the French Mandate and after independence, the parliamentary elections in Syria have been held under a system similar to the Lebanese one, with fixed representation for every religious community, including Druze, Alawites and Christians. In 1949 the system was modified, giving women the right to vote.

== Ba'athist Syria ==
During Ba'athist Syria, the government, led mainly by Hafez al-Assad and later his son Bashar al-Assad, routinely conducted elections to the presidency and legislature. However, independent observers unanimously regarded this to be a sham process. According to Electoral Integrity Project's 2022 Global report, elections in Ba'athist Syria were considered a "facade", and the country has one of the worst electoral integrity in the world alongside Comoros and Central African Republic.

The Syrian opposition boycotted elections that the Ba'athist government conducted during the Syrian civil war. (Note: Sources:) (Note: Sources:)

=== 1973 Constitution ===
According to the Syrian constitution of 1973, Syria was a form of one-party state where only the Syrian Ba'ath Party was legally allowed to hold effective power. The presidential candidate was appointed by the parliament, on suggestion of the Baath Party, and needed to be confirmed for a seven-year term in a national single-candidate referendum.

Elections are officially designated as the event of "renewing the pledge of allegiance" to the Assad family and the state enforces voting as a compulsory duty on every citizen. Announcement of the results are followed by Ba'athist rallies conducted across the country extolling the regime, wherein supporters declare their "devotion" to the President and celebrate "the virtues" of Assad dynasty. Although minor parties were allowed, they were legally required to accept the leadership of the dominant party.

A series of presidential elections organized by the cadres of the Ba'ath Party has been held every seven years since Bashar al-Assad's ascension to Presidency in 2000, which he regularly wins with overwhelming majority of votes.

In August 2011, President Assad signed Decree No. 101 on amending the General Elections Law. The Law stipulates that elections are to be held with public, secret, direct and equal voting where each Syrian voter, eighteen years and older, has one vote. The Law does not allow army members and policemen in service to participate in elections. It also provides for forming a higher judicial committee for elections, with its headquarters in Damascus to monitor the elections and ensure its integrity, in addition to forming judicial sub-committees in every Syrian province affiliated with the higher committee.

=== 2012 Constitution ===
Soon after the outbreak of the Syrian civil war, the Syrian government approved the 2012 Syrian constitution after a constitutional referendum. Article 88 introduced presidential electoral limits to a maximum of one re-election. Also, the constitution no longer specified the Ba'ath party as a vanguard and instead allowed for a multi-party system. Nonetheless, Ba'ath party remained the sole arbiter in publicizing electoral lists for candidacy.

By theoretically permitting non-Ba'athist activities, the government was able to mobilize recruits and militias from anti-opposition political parties at a time when regime's prospects for survival looked bleak in the Syrian civil war.

Once the Assad regime gained military edge in its favour, the state relinquished the accommodations and effectively restored the one-party state. In March 2015, President Assad signed General Elections Law No.5, which replaced previous election laws. The government then pursued an intense Baathification campaign with ideological vigor, such as packing the legislature with Ba'athist army officers and commanders of Ba'ath Brigades since the 2016 parliamentary elections. The government also disbanded non-Ba'athist militias and sidelined satellite parties of the National Progressive Front by increasing Ba'athist representation in the legislature.

As such, the United Nations continued to condemn Syrian elections, including its presidential elections in 2014 and 2021. These elections were only held in government-controlled territories due to the ongoing Syrian civil war. Overall, elections continued to be sham process, characterized by wide-scale rigging, repetitive voting and absence of voter registration and verification systems.

== Transitional government ==
In December 2024, the Syrian opposition successfully captured Damascus and led to the fall of the Assad regime. Afterwards, the opposition announced the creation of the Syrian transitional government to stabilize the war-torn nation and provide basic services to the public.

Since the transition began, there have been concerns over its future governance direction. The main organization in the government, HTS has Islamist origins, and there are fears that they may try to delay elections. Due to the need to first draft and approve a new constitutional declaration, there is not yet any official announcements of candidacy.

=== Timing ===
There are varying statements from Syrian officials over the expected timing of future elections. Hadi al-Bahra, president of the Syrian National Coalition, said that an 18-month transitional period was needed to establish "a safe, neutral, and quiet environment" for free elections, as outlined in the UNSC Resolution 2254. However, President of Syria Ahmed al-Sharaa also stated that elections would need at least 4 years to take place.

During a meeting between the French and German foreign ministers and al-Sharaa, the ministers, Barrot and Baerbock, specifically cautioned the new Syrian government against unnecessarily delaying elections.

=== 2025 Constitutional Declaration ===
On 5 October 2025, an indirect parliamentary election was held under a temporary electoral system established by the Constitutional Declaration of the Syrian Arab Republic. No direct popular vote occurred, instead multiple electoral colleges, selected by committees, voted to elect parliamentarians. It was emphasised that the electoral system was temporary, and that the next election would be through a popular vote.

== Latest elections ==
=== Presidential elections ===
Candidate	Party	Votes	%
Bashar al-Assad	Arab Socialist Ba'ath Party – Syria Region	13,540,860	95.19
Mahmoud Ahmad Marei	Democratic Arab Socialist Union	470,276	3.31
Abdullah Sallum Abdullah	Socialist Unionist Party (Syria)	213,968	1.50
Total		14,225,104	100.00

In 2021, Ba'athist Syria conducted its last presidential election. Bashar al-Assad comfortably won with 95% of the vote, though Western countries generally considered it "illegitimate" and "not free or fair".

=== Parliamentary elections ===
Graph of the party split among 209 seats.
Party or alliance		Votes	%	Seats	+/–
Kurdish National Council	Kurdistan Democratic Party of Syria			4	New
Kurdish National Council	Kurdistan Democratic Unity Party			1	New
Kurdish National Council	Kurdish Democratic Equality Party in Syria			1	New
Assyrian Democratic Organization				1	New
Movement for Justice and Development in Syria				1	New
Syrian Turkmen Assembly				1	New
Muslim Brotherhood of Syria				25	25
Independents				172	+105
Vacant				4	–
Total				210	–40
Total votes		6,000	–		
Registered voters/turnout		6,000	100.00		

=== Local elections ===
Positions in all 14 governorates, 158 cities, 572 towns and 726 municipalities were up for election.
