= Riyad Farid Hijab =

Prime Minister of Syria in 2012

- رياض فريد حجاب
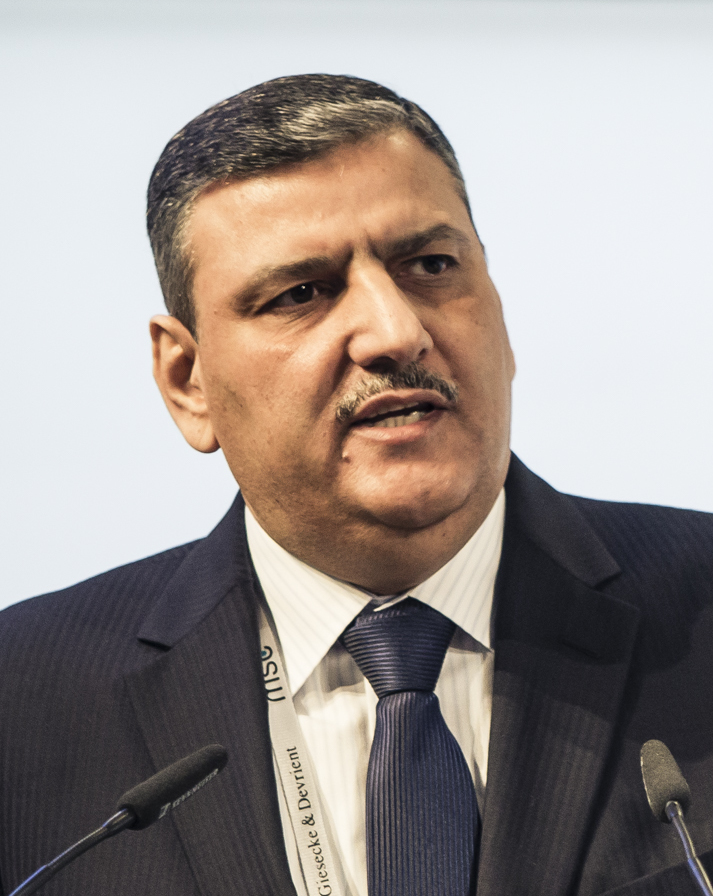
- Hijab at the 2016 Munich Security Conference

Prime Minister of Syria
- In office 23 June 2012 – 6 August 2012
- President: Bashar al-Assad
- Preceded by: Adel Safar
- Succeeded by: Omar Ibrahim Ghalawanji (Acting)

General Coordinator of the High Negotiations Committee
- In office 17 December 2015 – 20 November 2017
- Preceded by: Position established
- Succeeded by: Nasr al-Hariri

Minister of Agriculture and Agrarian Reform
- In office 14 April 2011 – 6 August 2012
- Prime Minister: Adel Safar
- Preceded by: Adel Safar
- Succeeded by: Subhi Ahmad al-Abdullah

Governor of Latakia
- In office 22 February 2011 – 14 April 2011
- President: Bashar al-Assad
- Preceded by: Khalil Mashhadia
- Succeeded by: Abdul Qader Abdul Sheikh

Governor of Quneitra
- In office 2008–2011
- President: Bashar al-Assad

Personal details
- Born: Riyad Farid Hijab; 1966 (age 59–60) Deir ez-Zor, Syria
- Party: Independent (since 2012); Arab Socialist Ba'ath Party (before 2012)
- Other political affiliations: Syrian National Coalition (2012–2014); National Progressive Front (before 2012)
- Children: 4
- Education: Damascus University (PhD)
- Occupation: Engineer; politician

Riyad Farid Hijab (Note: Pronounced /riːˈɑːd fəˈriːd hiːˈʒɑːb/; Arabic: رياض فريد حجاب, romanized: Riyāḍ Farīd Ḥijāb) (born 1966) is a Syrian politician and engineer who served as Prime Minister of Syria from June to August 2012 under President Bashar al-Assad. He previously served as Minister of Agriculture and Agrarian Reform from 2011 to 2012.

On 6 August 2012, the Government of Syria announced that Hijab had been dismissed from office. Shortly thereafter, a man identifying himself as Hijab’s spokesman, along with multiple media outlets, confirmed that Hijab had defected to the Syrian opposition amid the ongoing civil war. With the assistance of the Free Syrian Army, he escaped to Jordan along with 45 members of his extended family. Following his defection, Hijab became a senior figure in the exiled opposition and served as General Coordinator of the High Negotiations Committee from 2015 to 2017.

== Early life and career ==
Riyad Farid Hijab was born in 1966 into a Sunni Muslim family in the city of Deir ez-Zor, located in eastern Syria. He earned a doctorate (PhD) in agricultural engineering from Damascus University.

From 1989 to 1998, Hijab served as president of the Deir ez-Zor branch of the National Union of Syrian Students. He subsequently held a leadership position within the Ba'ath Party branch in Deir ez-Zor from 1998 to 2004. In 2004, he was appointed secretary of the local Ba'ath Party branch, a role he held until 2008.

Hijab was appointed governor of the southern Quneitra Governorate in 2008. On 22 February 2011, during the early stages of the Syrian civil war, he was reassigned as governor of Latakia Governorate. While serving in Latakia, he also led the provincial security committee, which was responsible for overseeing efforts to monitor and suppress opposition activity.

On 14 April 2011, Hijab was appointed Minister of Agriculture and Agrarian Reform in the cabinet of Prime Minister Adel Safar, succeeding Safar in the role following his appointment as Prime Minister.

== Premiership and defection (2012) ==
Following the parliamentary elections of May 2012, held under a newly ratified constitution and boycotted by the opposition, President Bashar al-Assad appointed Hijab as Prime Minister on 23 June 2012, at the age of 46. At the time, BBC News described him as "a staunch Assad loyalist and a key member of the ruling Ba'ath Party." His appointment surprised many analysts, who had expected Assad to signal reform by selecting a non-Ba'athist for the position. Soon after assuming office, Hijab was sanctioned by the United States Department of the Treasury.

According to his spokesman Mohammad Otari, Hijab resigned from office on 6 August 2012 and defected to Jordan with his family. Syrian state television reported that Hijab had been "dismissed" from his post and announced that Deputy Prime Minister Omar Ibrahim Ghalawanji would assume the role of caretaker prime minister. In a statement released through Otari, Hijab condemned the Syrian government, referring to it as a "terrorist regime," and declared: "I am from today a soldier in this blessed revolution." Otari stated that Hijab had coordinated his defection over several months with the assistance of the Free Syrian Army.

Hijab was reportedly en route to Qatar, a prominent backer of the Syrian opposition. Speaking at a press conference in Amman, Jordan, on 14 August 2012, Hijab claimed that the Assad government was collapsing "morally, financially, and militarily," and asserted that it controlled only approximately 30 percent of the country. He called on the Syrian Arab Army and its officers to defect from the regime and urged opposition forces to unite against President Assad and the ruling Ba'ath Party. On 17 August, Hijab traveled to Doha, Qatar, where he held meetings with opposition representatives to discuss efforts to unify anti-Assad factions and coordinate strategies for the regime’s removal.

On the day of his defection, Otari stated that Hijab had encouraged other officials to leave the regime. Opposition sources claimed that three other ministers and three army generals also defected on the same day. However, one of the ministers reportedly among them, Finance Minister Mohammad al Jililati, later appeared on Syrian state television to deny reports of his defection.

Although Hijab was not considered part of President Assad's inner circle, his defection was widely regarded as a major blow to the Syrian government. BBC News described it as the "highest-profile defection since the uprising began in March 2011" and "a stunning blow to President Assad". The Guardian's Middle East editor Ian Black characterized the defection as "a propaganda coup for the opposition," though not necessarily a "fatal blow" to the regime. The United States government stated that the defection demonstrated that Assad's government was "crumbling from within," and the Obama administration reiterated its call for Assad to resign.

Following Hijab’s departure, Deputy Prime Minister Omar Ibrahim Ghalawanji assumed his responsibilities in an interim capacity until 9 August 2012, when President Assad appointed Dr. Wael Nader al-Halqi as the new Prime Minister. Al-Halqi, a Sunni Ba'ath Party official and professor of medical sciences from Jasim, had previously served as Minister of Health. Assad publicly downplayed the impact of the defection, describing it as "a self-cleansing of the government firstly, and the country generally." According to Der Spiegel, Hijab and several other senior defectors had allegedly been bribed by French intelligence services and Qatar while still inside Syria. In the aftermath of the defection, journalist Moussa al-Omar expressed concern over Hijab’s health and access to medical treatment in a post on social media.

== Role in Syrian opposition ==
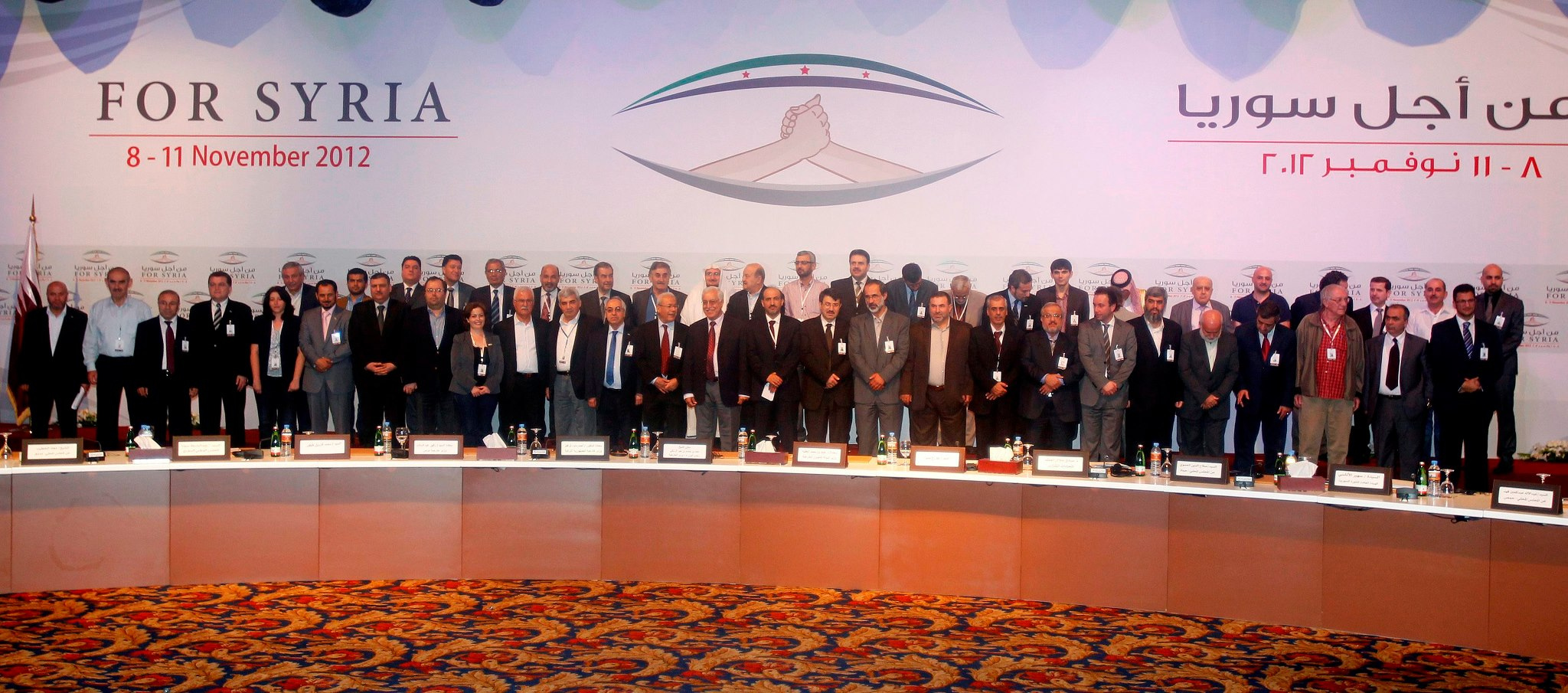
Meeting of Syrian National Coalition representatives in Doha, November 2012. Riyad Hijab is pictured ninth from the left.

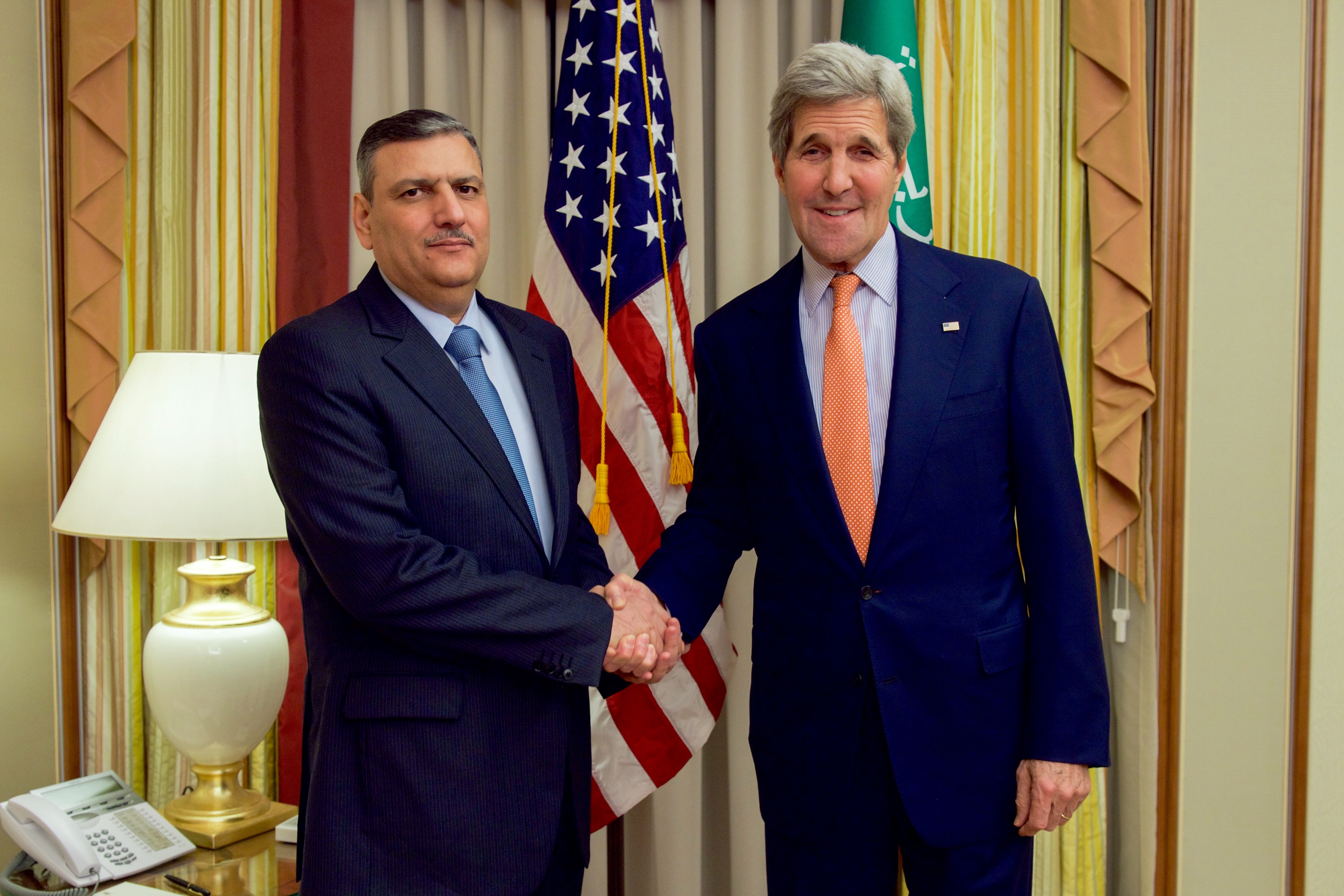
Hijab with U.S. Secretary of State John Kerry in January 2016

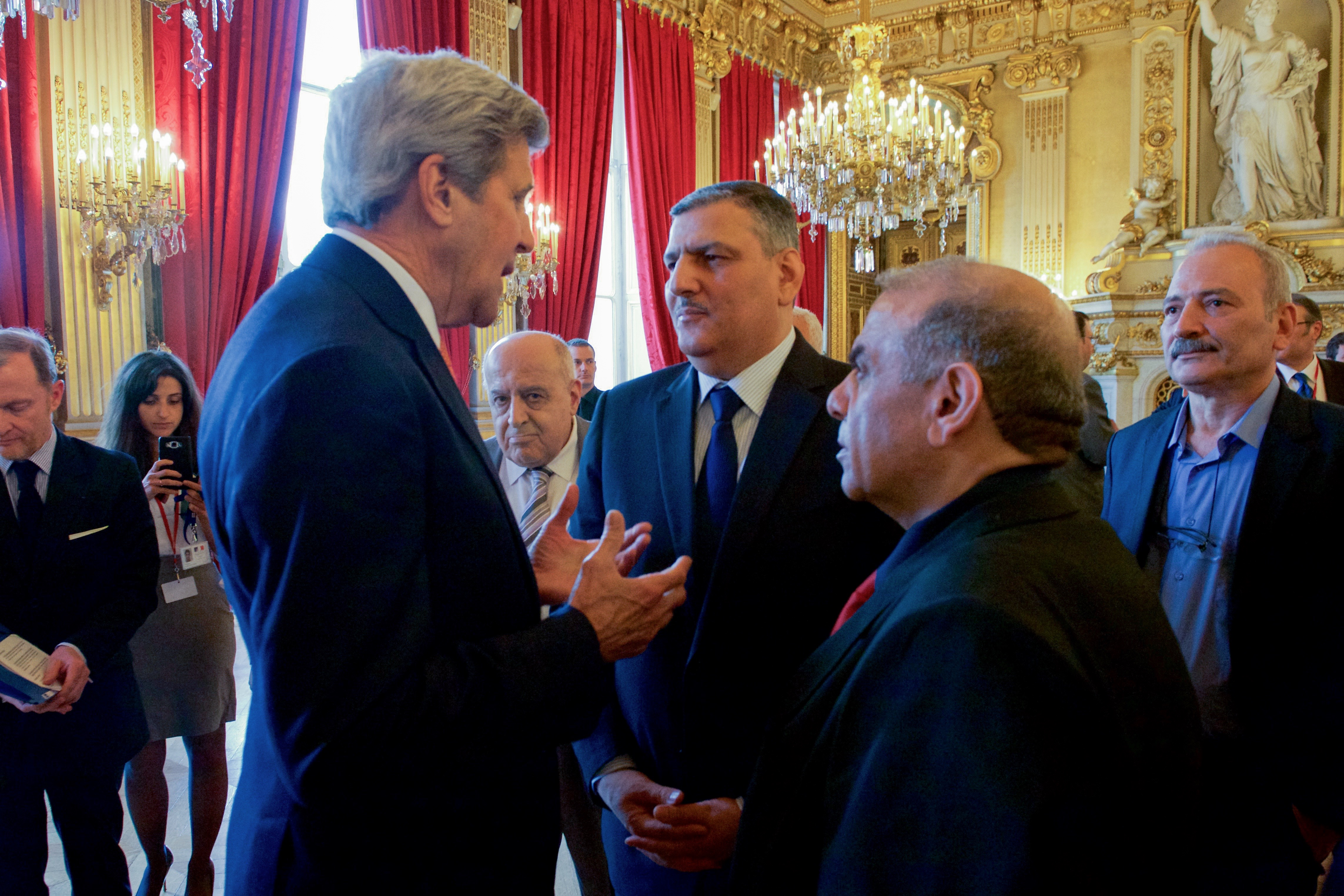
Hijab at a meeting at the Quai d'Orsay in May 2016

Following his defection towards the opposition, became affiliated with the National Coalition of Syrian Revolutionary and Opposition Forces, attending its meeting in Qatar on 18 November 2012. However, in January 2014, he withdrew from the National Coalition, in protest at internal divisions and what he described as its "autocratic decision‑making" and factionalism, followed by approximately 43 other members.

Hijab was selected in Riyadh in December 2015 by representatives of political and armed opposition groups as the General Coordinator of the High Negotiations Committee, the body responsible for selecting the opposition delegation to the Geneva III negotiation process. In this role, he attended the 52nd Munich Security Conference, where he highlighted the dire humanitarian situation across Syrian governorates and called on the international community to "lift the siege of besieged cities and areas, release all detainees, and stop attacks against the civilian population." After serving for nearly two years, Hijab resigned from his position on 20 November 2017, reportedly under pressure from Saudi Arabia, just two days before a major opposition conference in Riyadh. He reaffirmed his commitment to the revolution’s principles, including the formation of "a pluralistic, inclusive government representative of the mosaic of Syrian society that does not permit exclusion." He also stated his belief that there was "no role for Bashar al-Assad and his cronies" in Syria’s future.

In September 2018, Hijab asserted that the Assad regime lacked the capacity—militarily or numerically—to regain control over Idlib Governorate, which was then partially governed by the HTS-led Syrian Salvation Government. He pointed to “severe signs of weakness” even among regime commanders under Russian protection.

After a three-year absence from public political activity, Hijab reemerged in 2020 as a prominent opposition figure. On 30 July 2020, he took part in a webinar hosted by the US-based Center for Global Policy think tank, advocating for a comprehensive restructuring of opposition institutions. He stressed that "a new security and military equation is being formed in Syria, and its features must be understood and dealt with." Hijab also emphasized the need to strengthen the United Nations’ mediation role to achieve substantive progress on constitutional reform in Syria.

On 6 February 2022, Hijab attended the opening session of the ‘Whither Syria’ symposium in Doha, alongside leaders from opposition parties, scholars, and Salem al-Meslet, President of the Syrian National Coalition. During the event, he declared that “the regime has lost the conditions of legitimacy and must be held accountable for its crimes,” emphasizing that no lasting solution could be achieved while Bashar al-Assad remained in power. Hijab called on opposition groups to overcome internal divisions and renew efforts toward a unified national vision, highlighting the need to reform opposition institutions to better represent the Syrian people. He also urged the international community to reaffirm its support for a political transition based on United Nations Security Council Resolution 2254, while criticizing attempts to normalize relations with the Assad regime.

In late November 2024, Hay’at Tahrir al-Sham launched the Deterrence of Aggression offensive against the pro-Assad Syrian Arab Armed Forces. The campaign culminated with the fall of the Assad regime following President Assad’s resignation on 8 December and subsequent departure to Moscow. Hijab publicly celebrated what he considered the victory of the Syrian revolution. Reports from a handful of news outlets indicated that the French newspaper Le Figaro had information suggesting Hijab could be appointed to lead the Syrian caretaker government. However, the information was proven to be false and Mohammed al-Bashir was appointed to the role by the Syrian General Command.

== Political positions ==
Hijab has said that he is against federalism in Syria.

== Personal life ==
Hijab is married and has four children and is a Sunni Muslim.

== Notes ==
Political offices
Preceded by Adel Safar	Prime Minister of Syria; 2012	Succeeded by Omar Ibrahim Ghalawanji; Acting
