= Bader Jamous =

Syrian diplomat and politician (born 1968)

- بدر جاموس
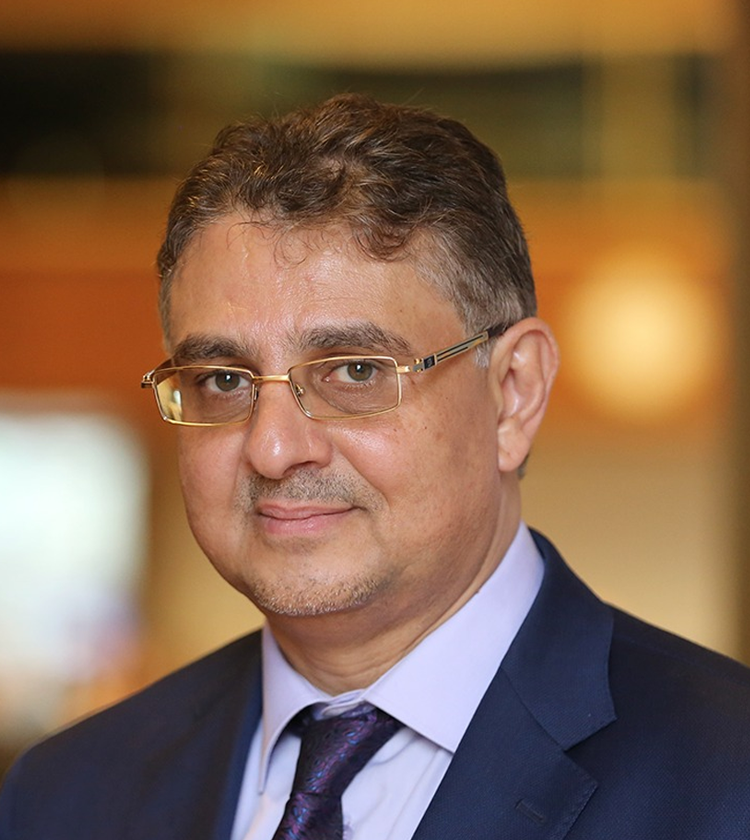
- Jamous in 2024

Member of the People's Assembly
- Incumbent
- Assumed office 1 July 2026
- Appointed by: Ahmed al-Sharaa
Other positions
President of the Syrian Negotiation Commission
In office 13 June 2022 – 12 February 2025
Preceded by	Anas al-Abdah
Succeeded by	Position abolished (Power fully handed over to Ahmed al-Sharaa)
Vice President of the Syrian National Coalition
In office 28 February 2018 – 29 June 2019 Serving with Dima Moussa
President	Abdurrahman Mustafa
Secretary-General of the Syrian National Coalition
In office 6 July 2013 – 12 July 2014
President	Ahmad Jarba
Preceded by	Mustafa Sabbagh
Succeeded by	Anas al-Abdah
Syrian Honorary Consul to Moldova
In office 2001–2011
President	Bashar al-Assad

Personal details
- Born: 28 May 1968 (age 58) Rif Dimashq, Syria
- Party: Independent
- Other political affiliations: Syrian National Coalition (2012–2025)

Bader Jamous (Arabic: بدر جاموس; born 28 May 1968) is a Syrian dentist, diplomat, and politician who has served as a member of the People's Assembly since 2026. An independent politician, he previously served as president of the Syrian Negotiation Commission from 2022 to 2025. He was also a founding member of the Syrian National Coalition and held several leadership positions within the organization.

== Career ==
Born in Rif Dimashq Governorate in 1968, Jamous completed his secondary education in Riyadh, Saudi Arabia. He studied dentistry at the International University of Moldova (ULIM) in Chișinău, graduating with a bachelor's degree in 1999. He later earned a bachelor's degree in international relations from the same university in 2012. He also worked at ULIM as an adviser on international relations and served as the honorary consul of Syria to Moldova from 2001 to 2011.

Following the outbreak of the Syrian civil war, Jamous joined the Syrian opposition. In 2012, he was among the founders of the Syrian National Coalition. Within the Coalition, he held a number of senior positions, including Secretary-General, and later became a member of its Political Body.

In June 2022, Jamous was elected president of the Syrian Negotiation Commission, the body representing the Syrian opposition in the Syrian peace process conducted under United Nations auspices.

On 12 February 2025, following the fall of the Assad regime, Jamous and Hadi al-Bahra, president of the Syrian National Coalition, met in Damascus with Syria's transitional president, Ahmed al-Sharaa. Following the meeting, the parties announced that the Syrian Negotiation Commission and the Syrian National Coalition would be dissolved and integrated into the institutions of the new Syrian state.
