= Geneva peace talks on Syria (2016) =

Intended peace negotiations

Geneva Peace talks (2016)
- Status: Suspended
- Genre: Peace talks
- Location: Geneva
- Country: Switzerland
- Organizer: United Nations

The Geneva peace talks on Syria, also known as Geneva III, were intended peace negotiations between the Syrian government and opposition in Geneva under the auspices of the UN. Although formally started on 1 February 2016, they were formally suspended only two days later, on 3 February 2016.

The talks, prepared by the International Syria Support Group (ISSG), were intended to resolve the Syrian Civil War.

== Preparation ==
After preparations by the International Syria Support Group (ISSG) and the UN Security Council, the initial targeted date for the start of the talks was 1 January 2016. Later, the UN targeted 29 January 2016.

For the opposition side, UN Special Envoy for Syria Staffan de Mistura invited the Saudi Arabia-backed coalition of 34 groups, the 'High Negotiation Committee' (HNC), which did not include Syrian Kurdish groups; he also invited some moderate opposition members, supported by Russia but not part of the Saudi-supported coalition.

Turkey but also the HNC objected to the participation of the main Syrian Kurdish party, the Democratic Union Party (PYD) in the talks. Therefore the PYD was excluded from the peace talks.

On 28 January, the Saudi-backed HNC still refused to come to the Geneva talks, alleging the Assad government had failed to stop air strikes and have supported them and sieges of rebel-held towns, and refused to release detainees before the talks would start such ceasefire being part of the understanding of the ISSG peace plan of 14 November 2015. On 29 January, the Saudi-backed HNC changed their minds and decided to travel to Geneva, not to negotiate with the Syrian government but to talk with UN representative Staffan de Mistura and press their humanitarian case to the public.

The HNC was dominated by Mohammad Alloush of the Salafist group Jaysh al-Islam, a cousin and brother-in-law of Zahran Alloush, who had been killed in December 2015 in a missile attack claimed by the Syrian government. Russia and Iran deem Mohammad Alloush a terrorist.

The Syrian government’s delegation was led by Bashar Jaafari, Syria′s ambassador to the UN.

== Formal start of talks ==
On 1 February 2016, the UN announced the formal start of the talks.

On 2 February, the coalition of opposition groups HNC warned that the offensive military operations conducted by Syrian government forces north of the city of Aleppo could put the intended peace talks at risk.

== Suspension ==
On 3 February, UN envoy Staffan de Mistura suspended the peace talks, until 25 February. A UN official said anonymously that de Mistura had probably suspended the talks because the UN did not want to be associated with the Syrian government’s military advance against rebels north of Aleppo, backed by Russian airstrikes. Staffan de Mistura insisted that negotiations had not failed and would resume on 25 February.

Russian foreign minister Lavrov commented that "the [Syrian] opposition took a completely unconstructive position and tried to put forward preconditions".

Rebel commanders were cited as saying they hoped the peace talks' collapse would "convince their foreign backers, states including Turkey and Saudi Arabia, that it was time to send them more powerful and advanced weapons, including anti-aircraft missiles".

== Cessation of hostilities (27 February 2016) ==
On 12 February 2016, the ISSG powers established an ISSG ceasefire task force, under the auspices of the UN, co-chaired by Russia and the United States, and issued a joint communique saying inter alia: ″An ISSG task force will within one week elaborate modalities for a nationwide cessation of hostilities. The ISSG members unanimously committed to immediately facilitate the full implementation of the UN Security Council Resolution 2254, adopted unanimously December 18, 2015.″ That same 12 February, the Syrian President Assad vowed to regain whole Syria, and Russia continued its bombing support of Assad. Turkey on 13 February began a sustained campaign of shelling Kurdish YPG targets in northern Syria.

On 22 February 2016, in Munich, foreign ministers of Russia and the U.S., as co-chairs of the ISSG, announced that they had concluded a deal to seek a nationwide cessation of hostilities in Syria to begin a week later. The deal set out the Terms for a Cessation of Hostilities in Syria. Russia and the U.S. proposed that the cessation of hostilities commence at 00:00 (Damascus time) on February 27, 2016. The cessation of hostilities was to be applied to those parties to the Syrian conflict that had indicated their commitment to and acceptance of the terms thereof; consistent with UN Security Council Resolution 2254 and the statements of the ISSG, the cessation of hostilities did not apply to ISIL, Jabhat al-Nusra, or other terrorist organizations as designated by the UN Security Council.

On 23 February 2016, Russia announced the establishment of a coordination center to reconcile the warring parties in Syria its Khmeimim airbase in Latakia Governorate. As specified in the 22 February 2016 ISSG agreement, the Bulletin of the Russian Centre for reconciliation of opposing sides in the Syrian Arab Republic began publishing daily reports on the ceasefire to the Ministry of Defence of the Russian Federation Facebook page and Twitter feed.

The ISSG countries are supposed to monitor compliance with the terms of the truce, which was pronounced as of 29 February 2016, when the ISSG task force met in Geneva, to be largely holding.

== Aftermath ==
A new round of talks in Geneva, originally planned for 8 February 2017, opened on 23 February 2017.

== See also ==
- Syrian conflict peace proposals
- Geneva II
