= Syrian peace process =

Resolution of the Syrian Revolution and Civil War

The Syrian peace process is the ensemble of initiatives and plans to resolve the Syrian civil war. Peace talks were unsuccessful from 2011 until the fall of the Assad regime at the end of 2024. Between December 2024 and March 2025, a Syrian transitional government was formed, though it was largely dominated by Hay'at Tahrir al-Sham and excluded several major political and regional factions.

Plans for a negotiated peace between Ba'athist Syria and the Syrian opposition to Bashar al-Assad were ultimately unsuccessful. They began in 2011 with unsuccessful initiatives by the Arab League, the UN Special Envoy on Syria, Russia and Western powers. The negotiating parties were representatives of the Syrian regime and the Syrian opposition. The Democratic Autonomous Administration of North and East Syria (DAANES) was excluded at the insistence of Turkey. In January 2012 and November 2013, Russia suggested talks in Moscow between the Syrian government and the opposition. In March–May 2012, hopes were raised by a United Nations/Arab League plan coordinated by former UN Secretary-General Kofi Annan. In January and February 2014, the Geneva II Conference on Syria took place, organized by then-UN envoy to Syria Lakhdar Brahimi. On 30 October 2015, further talks started in Vienna involving officials from the United States, the European Union, Russia, China, and various regional actors such as Saudi Arabia, Egypt, Turkey and, for the first time, Iran. Peace talks with rebel leadership continued in Astana, Kazakhstan in 2017. The Kazakh officials offered Astana as a neutral venue and "a natural home" for peace negotiations on Syria. The latest major effort to bring about an end to the war started in October 2019 in Geneva with the convening of the Syrian Constitutional Committee to draft a new constitution for Syria under the auspices of the United Nations. The Assad regime's refusal to engage in the peace process was rendered moot by 2024 Syrian opposition offensives which toppled the regime in 11 days.

The fall of the Assad regime in December 2024 led to the creation of the Syrian transitional government and renewed negotiations for peace between all the revolutionary factions. On 11 December 2024, the Syrian transitional government began negotiations to dissolve all non-state armed groups in the country. The DAANES remained autonomous after the fall of the Assad regime, while its military wing, the Syrian Democratic Forces (SDF), began clashing with the new military, which included former Syrian National Army (SNA) factions. On 29 December 2024, Ahmed al-Sharaa stated in a televised interview that SDF would be integrated into Syria's Ministry of Defense and that negotiations were underway. On 30 January 2025, Abdurrahman Mustafa, head of the Syrian Interim Government (SIG) in northern Syria, congratulated Ahmed al-Sharaa after he declared himself president during the Syrian Revolution Victory Conference. It was also announced that the SIG was to be at the disposal of the transitional government. The transitional government started to deploy its forces into the areas under the SIG control in February, as the SNA started to integrate into the newly formed Syrian Army. Government forces started to dismantle barracks and other military infrastructure in the area. On 12 February 2025, al-Shaara met with representatives of the Syrian National Coalition and the Syrian Negotiation Commission, including their respective presidents Hadi al-Bahra and Bader Jamous. It was announced that both organizations would dissolve within the new authorities. On 12 February, Minister for Foreign Affairs Asaad al-Shaibani announced that a new government would be formed by 1 March, which "will represent the Syrian people as much as possible and take its diversity into account". On 10 March 2025, an agreement was signed to integrate the SDF into the structures of the transitional government.

== Timeline ==
=== Arab League peace plans 2011–2012 ===
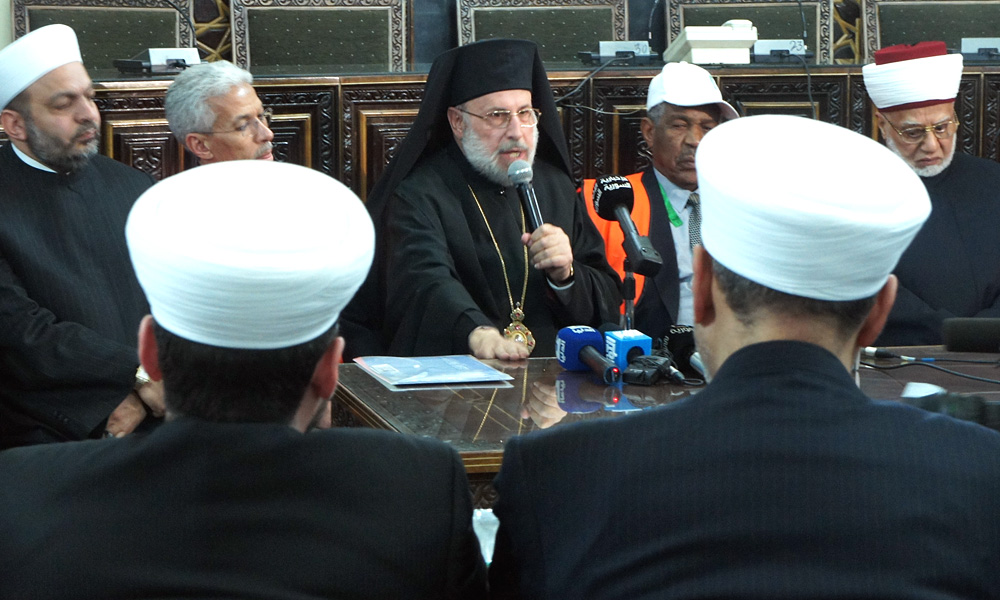
Muslims and Christians at a meeting with Arab League monitors in Damascus on 17 January 2012

In November 2011–January 2012, the Arab League (AL) twice tried to accomplish an end to Syrian government (and opposition) violence and convince both parties to start talks instead of fighting.

After the Syrian government's agreement to the AL plan of 19 December the AL sent a monitoring mission to Syria. Violence continued and Saudi Arabia on 22 January withdrew its monitors from the mission, and called on Russia, China and all other states to pressure Syria strongly to adhere to the AL peace plan. The Arab League on 28 January 2012 ended its monitoring mission.

=== Russian peace initiatives for Syria ===
==== 2012 'informal talks' proposal ====
On 30 January 2012, the Russian foreign ministry suggested "informal" talks in Moscow between the Syrian government and opposition, and said the Syrian authorities had already agreed to the Russian offer. Abdel Baset Seda, a member of the Syrian National Council's executive committee, told Reuters that the SNC had not received any formal invitation for such talks, but would decline if one arrived: "Our position has not changed and it is that there is no dialogue with (President Bashar al-Assad)".

==== February 2012: offering the removal of Assad ====
In February 2012, Martti Ahtisaari held talks with envoys of the permanent members of the United Nations Security Council. During those discussions, the Russian ambassador, Vitaly Churkin, proposed a three-point plan that would bring the Syrian government and opposition to the negotiation table and result in Assad stepping down as president. But, according to Ahtisaari, the US, Britain, and France rejected that proposal, being convinced that fall of Assad's government was inevitable. "It was an opportunity lost in 2012," he said in an interview in September 2015. Other Western diplomats refute Ahtisaari's claims, with one stating, "I very much doubt the P3 [the US, UK and France] refused or dismissed any such strategy offer at the time. The questions were more to do with sequencing—the beginning or end of process—and with Russia's ability to deliver—to get Assad to step down."

==== Brokerage Proposal, 2013 ====
On 7 November 2013, Russia again announced it was trying to broker talks in Moscow between the Syrian government and opposition, seeing that the U.S. and Russian negotiators failed to agree on whether or not Assad should be forced out of office. Russia's Deputy Foreign Minister Bogdanov said, the Moscow talks could focus on humanitarian problems as well on some political issues.

=== Friends of Syria Group, February 2012 ===
In February 2012, the then French President Nicolas Sarkozy initiated an international "contact group" to find a solution for the Syrian conflict, after Russia and China had vetoed a 4 February 2012 UN Security Council resolution. The group held four meetings, all in the year 2012.

=== Kofi Annan Peace Plan, March 2012 ===
The Kofi Annan peace plan (Joint Special Envoy for the United Nations and the Arab League), launched in March 2012, intended to commit both the Syrian government and opposition to a cease fire and commit the Syrian government to initiate deliberations with the opposition on their aspirations and concerns. After Annan on 12 April had assumed that both parties had agreed to a cease fire, the UN already on 1 May had to admit that both parties were violating it.

=== Geneva I, June 2012 ===
An "action group" conference (now referred to as Geneva I Conference on Syria) was held on Saturday 30 June 2012, in Geneva, initiated by the then UN peace envoy to Syria Kofi Annan, and attended by US Secretary of State Hillary Clinton, Russian Foreign Minister Lavrov, a representative of China, British Foreign Secretary Hague, and Kofi Annan. Mr Annan, issuing a communiqué, said that the conference agreed on the need for a "transitional government body with full executive powers" which could include members of the present Syrian government and of the opposition. William Hague said that all five permanent members of the UN Security Council—the US, Russia, China, France and the UK—supported Mr Annan's efforts. Clinton however suggested that Syrian dictator Assad could, in such transitional government, not remain in power, which immediately was contradicted by Lavrov.

The Geneva talks were condemned by Ahrar al-Sham leader Hassan Abboud.

=== 16th Summit of the Non-Aligned Movement ===
During the 16th Summit of the Non-Aligned Movement held from 26 to 31 August 2012 in Tehran, Iran and attended by leaders of 120 countries, Iran intended to draw up a new peace resolution aiming to resolve the Syrian civil war. but a consensus was not reached between the leaders.

=== Eid al-Adha cease fire attempt, September 2012 ===
Lakhdar Brahimi, an Algerian diplomat, appointed on 1 September 2012, as the new UN–Arab League special representative for Syria, appealed on both the Syrian government and the armed opposition to stop the killing during the Islamic festival of Eid al-Adha, which fell that year probably on 26 October 2012, and 3 or 4 days after it. Government and most of the opposition groups said 'yes' to his appeal. Yet, according to Brahimi, the lull in the fighting lasted very short, after which both parties accused the other of not having stopped its violence.

=== Geneva II, 2014 ===
The Geneva II Middle East peace conference was a United Nations-backed international (peace) conference, aimed at bringing Syrian government and opposition together to discuss a transitional government. Lakhdar Brahimi, UN special envoy to Syria, tried to pursue the conference in close cooperation with the U.S. and Russia. It started on 22 January 2014 and ended on 31 January; no agreement was reached.

=== Astana Opposition conference (2015) ===
In early April, Randa Kassis asked the Kazakh President to host talks in Astana. President Nursultan Nazarbayev accepted the proposal. This initiative has been criticized by some of Syrian Opposition members. On 25—27 May 2015, a number of Syrian Opposition groups convened in Astana, Kazakhstan The Syrian government chose not to attend.

A second conference was held in Astana on 2–4 October 2015; the assembled Opposition groups adopted a declaration that called for the parliamentary election scheduled for 2016 to be held under the supervision of the international community; Nursultan Nazarbayev was asked to step in as a mediator in the Syrian conflict.

The talks were mediated by Kazakh Deputy Foreign Minister Askar Mussinov and Director of the French Centre for Political and Foreign Affairs Fabien Baussart. Mme Gulshara Abdykalikova, the Secretary of State of Kazakhstan opened the talks in Astana.

=== Four Committees Initiative ===
The Four committees initiative is a proposal put forward by United Nations envoy Staffan de Mistura on 29 July 2015 as a way to start the peace process in the Syrian civil war. There had been no peace talks on Syria since the Geneva II meetings in early 2014 ended in failure.

=== Zabadani Ceasefire Agreement ===
In September 2015 Hezbollah, an ally of the Syrian government, announced a six-month truce between the rebel-held town of Zabadani near Damascus and two Shia towns in the north-west of Syria. The deal was reached after mediation from Iran.

=== Vienna Process (since October 2015) ===
On 23 October 2015, the Foreign Ministers of the United States, Russia, Saudi Arabia and Turkey met and talked in Vienna, Austria, to find a way to end the Syrian conflict.

On 30 October 2015, the first round of the Syria peace talks were held in Vienna with foreign ministers of 20 countries participating: U.S., Russia, Iran, Saudi Arabia, Turkey, China, United Kingdom, France, Italy, Germany and other countries. The ministers agreed on the need of the Syrian government and opposition to start political talks. The second round of the Vienna talks held in mid-November produced an agreement on the need to convene Syrian government and opposition representatives in formal negotiations under UN auspices with a target date of 1 January 2016.

A day after a meeting of anti-government factions, including Ahrar ash-Sham, held in Riyadh, Saudi Arabia, on 10 December produced a statement of principles to guide peace talks with the Syrian government, Syrian president Bashar Assad said he would not negotiate with "foreign terrorists." Russia also rejected the outcome of the meeting in Riyadh, which it said was unrepresentative and included terrorist groups.

After John Kerry visited Moscow where he met his Russian counterpart Sergey Lavrov as well as Vladimir Putin on 15 December, it was announced that on 18 December 2015 world powers would meet in New York to pass a UN resolution endorsing the principles of the Syria peace process.

On 18 December 2015, the UN Security Council, having overcome the gridlock on Syria that had persisted since October 2011, unanimously passed Resolution 2254 (2015), endorsing the ISSG's transitional plan that set out a timetable for formal talks and a unity government within six months; the resolution put UN special envoy Staffan de Mistura in charge of organising Syria talks. However, the major powers remained divided on who should represent the Syrian opposition; no mention was made of the future role of Syrian President Bashar Assad.

=== December 2015 Riyadh conference of Syrian opposition groups ===
On 10 December 2015, a two-day meeting started in Riyadh, the capital of Saudi Arabia, aiming at unifying Syria's opposition groups and forming an opposition delegation for the planned negotiations with the Syrian government (see Syria peace talks in Vienna 14 November 2015 meeting).

Syrian Kurdish factions were not represented at the meeting in Riyadh. Jabhat al-Nusra had not been invited because of its assumed 'terrorist links' or al-Qaeda ties.

An agreement emerged on 12 December: 34 opposition groups and individuals allied themselves as the High Negotiations Committee. This included, among others, Ahrar al-Sham and Jaysh al-Islam, but did not include Syrian Kurds and not include some moderate opposition members supported by Russia. Two of the 34 members are women, augmented by a women-only advisory body known as the Women's Consultative Committee.

France announced that the Syrian opposition had reached an agreement and had "adopted a common program" in Riyadh. Apart from France and Saudi Arabia, also Turkey and Qatar supported that High Negotiation Committee.

The High Negotiation Committee was tasked with identifying 15 individuals willing and able to serve on the official opposition delegation to the Geneva III negotiations, of which 3 were women.

Russia however said that those gathered in Riyadh did not represent all opposition groups and therefore were not in a position to speak on behalf of the entire Syrian opposition.

=== Geneva III, January 2016 ===
On Friday, 29 January 2016, a UN Peace Conference for Syria started in Geneva in Switzerland. At the first day, Syrian government and opposition refused to sit in the same room together. On 3 February 2016, UN envoy Staffan de Mistura suspended the peace talks.

Russian foreign minister Lavrov commented that "the [Syrian] opposition took a completely unconstructive position and tried to put forward preconditions".

Rebel commanders were cited as saying they hoped the peace talks' collapse would "convince their foreign backers, states including Turkey and Saudi Arabia, that it was time to send them more powerful and advanced weapons, including anti-aircraft missiles".

=== The Syrian Women's Advisory Board, February 2016 ===
UN Special Envoy for Syria Staffan de Mistura announced appointment of a 12-woman advisory body, name the Women's Advisory Board (or "WAB" for short) on 2 February 2016. WAB members include opposition, government sympathizers, and Islamist-tending women. The WAB, however, is politically unaffiliated; the board does not participate directly in the negotiations but does advise the UN mediator on all proceedings.

The WAB has been criticized for the lack of transparency in member selection, with allegations that it is unrepresentative. The Syrian Women's Network went as far as to withdraw from the WAB based on these critiques.

=== Cessation of Hostilities, February 2016 ===
On 12 February 2016, the International Syria Support Group (ISSG) established an ISSG ceasefire task force, under the auspices of the UN, co-chaired by Russia and the United States, and issued a joint communique saying inter alia: "An ISSG task force will within one week elaborate modalities for a nationwide cessation of hostilities."

On 22 February 2016, in Munich, foreign ministers of Russia and the U.S., as co-chairs of the ISSG, announced that they had concluded a deal to seek a nationwide cessation of hostilities in Syria to begin a week later. The deal set out the Terms for a Cessation of Hostilities in Syria. Russia and the U.S. proposed that the cessation of hostilities commence at 00:00 (Damascus time) on 27 February 2016.

The ISSG countries are supposed to monitor compliance with the terms of the truce, which was pronounced as of 29 February 2016, when the ISSG task force met in Geneva, to be largely holding.

=== September 2016 cease fire deal ===
On 10 September 2016, Russia and U.S. reached a deal on establishing a cease fire between the Syrian Assad government and a US-supported coalition of so-called 'mainstream Syrian opposition rebel groups' including umbrella group 'High Negotiations Committee' (HNC), effective from 12 September, while jointly agreeing to continue attacks on Jabhat Fateh al-Sham (former al-Nusra Front) and Islamic State of Iraq and the Levant (ISIL).

After US-led coalition airstrikes on Syrian Army troops on 17 September, of which the US claimed it was an accident, the Syrian government declared the ceasefire to be over.

=== October 2016 Lausanne talks ===
On 15 October, the U.S., Russia, Saudi Arabia, Turkey, Qatar and Iran had talks about the Syrian war, in Lausanne, Switzerland.

=== Initiation of Astana talks, and ceasefire (December 2016) ===
In mid-December 2016, Vladimir Putin of Russia and Recep Tayyip Erdoğan of Turkey agreed to suggest Astana, the capital of Kazakhstan, as a new venue for carrying on the Syria peace talks.

On 20 December 2016, the foreign ministers of Iran, Turkey, and Russia agreed, pursuant to the United Nations Security Council Resolution 2254 (Dec. 2015), to hold Syria peace talks in Astana, Kazakhstan.

On 28 December 2016, Turkey and Russia agreed on a nationwide ceasefire plan for Syria to go into effect at 00:00 on 30 December 2016. The Syrian Democratic Council—representing the Syrian Democratic Forces, an alliance of Kurdish, Arab and Syriac militias mostly led by YPG—was not invited to the talks. ISIL, the al-Nusra Front, and the YPG were excluded from the ceasefire, and the following rebel groups signed up for the truce:

- Sham Legion
- Ahrar al-Sham
- Jaysh al-Islam
- Free Idlib Army
- Levant Front
- Jabhat Ahl al-Sham

However, the Ahrar al-Sham spokesman denied having signed the deal.

The political efforts by Russia and Turkey were endorsed by the UN Resolution 2336 adopted 31 December 2016.

=== First round of Astana talks (January 2017) ===
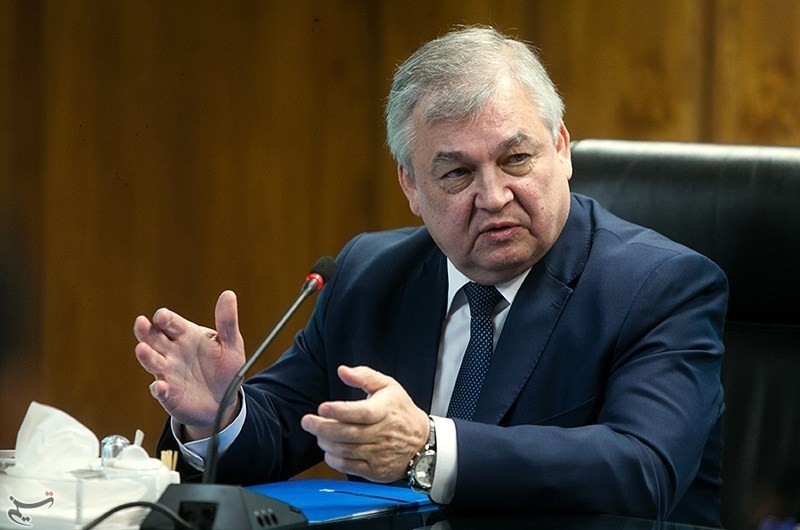
Russia's special envoy on Syria and lead negotiator to the Astana talks, Alexander Lavrentyev, 23 January 2017

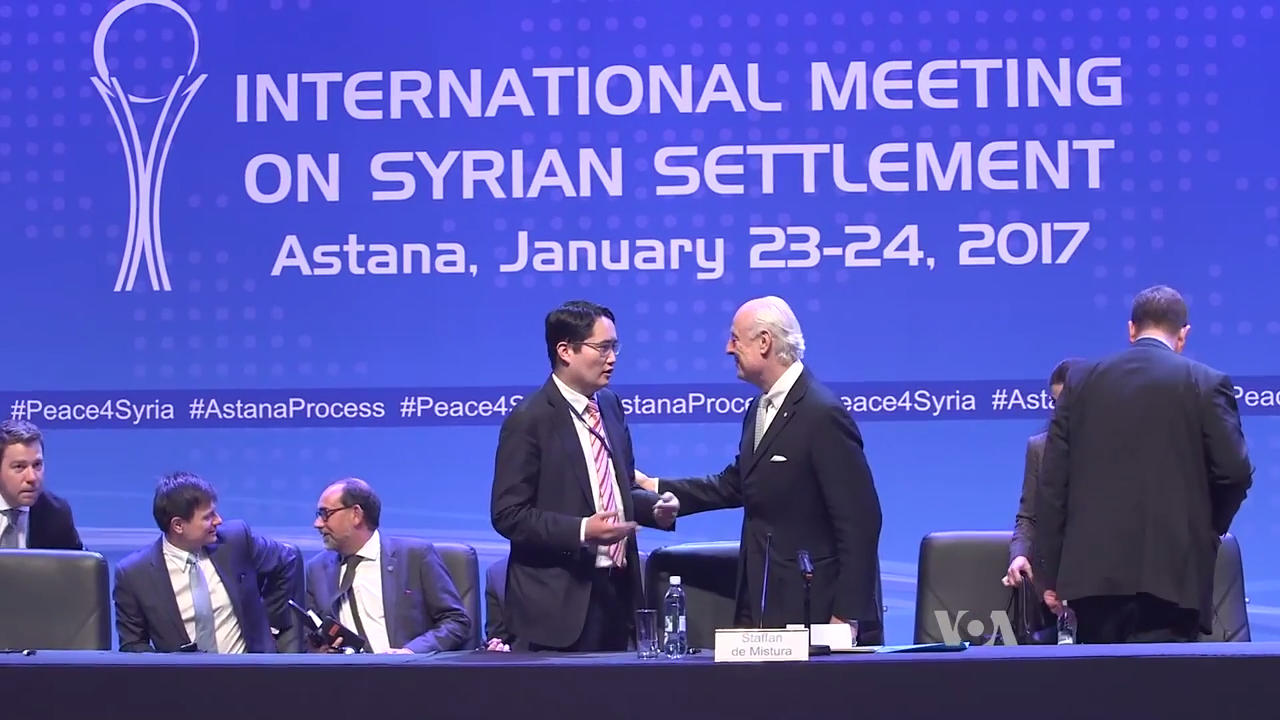
The International Meeting on Syrian Settlement in Astana, 25 January 2017

On 23 January 2017, a Syrian opposition delegation that included twelve rebel factions convened with Syria's government delegation, headed by Bashar Jaafari, in Astana for indirect talks titled the International Meeting on Syrian Settlement, sponsored by Russia, Turkey and Iran. Astana was agreed on as the venue, since it was viewed as neutral by all the parties involved. The opposition side included Mohammed Alloush, the political leader of Jaysh al-Islam, which Russia had proposed designating as a terrorist organisation.

The start of talks in Astana was described as the "Astana-isation" of the Geneva talks, implying a shift towards the Syrian opposition conducting military operations and away from Syrians with only political influence. The talks took place on 23 and 24 January; the first day ended without the sides reaching an agreement. The "Astana Process" talks aimed to support the framework in accordance with the UN Security Council Resolution 2254, and ended on the 24th with an agreement between Iran, Russia, and Turkey to form a joint monitoring body to work to enforce the Resolution 2254 ceasefire.

After the talks in January 2017, Russia offered a draft for a future constitution of Syria, which would inter alia turn the "Syrian Arab Republic" into the "Republic of Syria", introduce decentralized authorities as well as elements of federalism like "association areas", strengthen the parliament at the cost of the presidency, and realize secularism by abolishing Islamic jurisprudence as a source of legislation.

=== Geneva IV, February–March 2017 ===
The Geneva IV peace talks on Syria were talks between the Syrian government and the Syrian opposition under the auspices of the United Nations. The opposition was represented by the High Negotiations Committee, while the government delegation was led by Syria's UN ambassador, Bashar Jaafari. The talks began on 23 February 2017 and concluded on 3 March. The government delegation sought to focus on counter-terrorism while the opposition sought to focus on political transition.

=== February 2017 Astana talks ===
Two days of talks on strengthening the ceasefire regime (see above, Dec. 2016) in the Syrian conflict ended 16 Feb in Astana with the adoption of a document to formalise monitoring of the 29 December 2016, ceasefire agreement (see above). The document will guide the activities of a joint operational group to be formed by Russia, Turkey and Iran that was agreed to be set up during the earlier meeting in January in Astana. The document is also meant to guide confidence-building measures among the opposing sides.

=== March 2017 and May 2017 Astana talks: De-escalation zones ===
The third round of meetings in Astana held between 14 and 15 March yielded further agreement by all parties to the existing ceasefire agreement. As a result of these talks, Iran joined Turkey and Russia as a guarantor state.

On 4 May 2017, at the fourth round of the Astana talks, representatives of Russia, Iran, and Turkey signed a memorandum to establish four "de-escalation zones" in Syria. The largest one of those included the Idlib Governorate and adjoining districts of Hama, Aleppo and Latakia Governorates; the other three zones were set up in the northern rebel-controlled parts of the Homs Governorate, the rebel-controlled eastern Ghouta, and along the Jordan–Syria border. In those areas, combat operations would be halted as of 6 May 2017; it also envisaged suspension of flights of military aircraft in those areas, as well as the creation of conditions for humanitarian access, medical assistance, the return of displaced civilians to their homes and the restoration of damaged infrastructure. The memorandum was concluded for six months and could be extended automatically.

The deal was not signed by Syrian government or rebel groups; rebel representatives rejected it because it left too many loopholes for the Syrian government to continue bombing civilian areas. The Democratic Union Party stated that the ceasefire zones were "dividing Syria up on a sectarian basis".

=== Astana talks, July 2017 ===
The fifth round of peace talks initially planned for 5–7 July 2017 in Astana, Kazakhstan were moved to 12–15 July 2017. The Astana Process has the support of the UN's Staffan de Mistura who said the Astana talks are making "clear progress" to reducing violence in Syria. The Southern Front boycotted these talks.

As a precursor to these peace talks, on 9 July 2017 at 0900 GMT, an American-Russian-Jordanian brokered ceasefire commenced, though on 14 July, opposition groups participating in the Quneitra offensive rejected the ceasefire, with clashes resuming across Southern Syria. Besides minor violations from all sides involved, as of 15 July, the ceasefire has held.

=== Astana talks, September 2017 ===
On 14 September 2017, representatives of Iran, Russia and Turkey in Astana agreed on the implementation of a fourth "de-escalation zone", in the northern governorate of Idlib. Kazakh Foreign Minister Kairat Abdrakhmanov affirmed Kazakhstan's commitment to serving as a neutral venue for continued peace talks.

=== Astana talks, October 2017 ===
The seventh round of the Astana Process on Syrian peace started in Astana with support of both Russia and Iran. The talks maintained previous Astana Process agreements, addressed exchange of detainees, POWs and missing persons. The guarantor states—Russia, Turkey, and Iran—affirmed consensus that a political solution under UN Security Council resolution 2254 should be found.

=== Astana talks, December 2017 ===
The eighth round of the Astana Process on Syrian peace started in Astana. The talks aimed at ending the nearly seven-year-long conflict in the country, with the humanitarian crisis in the besieged Eastern Ghouta suburb of Damascus at the table. The head of the Syrian Arab Republic delegation called for the "immediate and unconditional withdrawal of foreign forces from Syrian territory" including Turkish and US forces.

=== Sochi talks, January 2018 ===
In January 2018 Russia convened the Syrian National Dialogue Congress in Sochi, in which 1,500 delegates participated.

=== Astana talks, March 2018 ===
The ninth round of the Astana Process on Syrian peace took place on 16 March 2018. The trilateral ministerial meeting on Syria was to include Iran, Russia and Turkey.

=== Idlib memorandum, September 2018 ===
On 17 September 2018 the Russian president Vladimir Putin and Turkish president Recep Tayyip Erdoğan reached an agreement to create a buffer zone in Idlib.

=== Northern Syria Buffer Zone agreement, August 2019 ===
On 7 August 2019, the United States and Turkey reached a deal, which would set up a new demilitarized buffer zone in northern Syria to preempt a potential Turkish invasion of SDF-held Northern Syria.

=== Syrian Constitutional Committee in Geneva, October 2019–present ===
In September 2019, Geir Otto Pedersen, United Nations Special Envoy for Syria since 31 October 2018, called for prisoner exchanges as a confidence-building measure between Syrian authorities, opposition groups and civil society groups to take place prior to a planned October 2019 constitution-drafting committee meeting in Geneva. The committee is planned to include 50 people each from government, opposition and civil society, with 15 from each group to work specifically on drafting proposals for a constitution.

The Syrian Constitutional Committee officially convened for the first time on 30 October 2019 at the United Nations Office at Geneva.

The committee's third session of negotiations, among the 45-member small body, with 15 members from the government, opposition, and civil society, respectively, started in late August 2020. Pedersen stated that he had "received a 'strong signal of support' from 'key international players' and from "all sides in the Constitutional Committee" for the continuation of the peace process. Hadi al-Bahra, one of the opposition leaders, and Ahmad Kuzbari, on behalf of the Syrian government, were co-chairs of the session.

On 22 October 2021, yet another round of peace talks failed to reach common ground. No date for the next round was determined.

=== Astana meeting, December 2019 ===
The delegations of Turkey, Iran, and Russia arrived in Astana (then named Nur-Sultan), on 10 December 2019 for two days of trilateral talks known as the Astana process.

The talks ended without any definitive ceasefire agreement, reportedly due to the anti–government side's refusal to accept new Russian terms regarding control of the Idlib province.

=== Astana Process, July 2021 ===
The 16th International High-Level Meeting on Syria within the Astana Process was held in Astana on 7–8 July 2021. Representatives from the Syrian government, Syrian opposition were present, as well as delegations from Iran, Russia, Turkey and others. High representative observers from the UN, Jordan, Lebanon and Iraq also attended.

In a joint statement, Russia, Iran, and Turkey reaffirmed their stance to oppose separatist plans aimed at undermining a unified Syria.

This round of talks focused largely on the humanitarian situation in Syria. All participants called upon the international community and the UN to increase assistance to Syria including infrastructure such as water, food, electricity, schools, and hospitals.

All parties also stressed the need to hold the next meeting of the Syrian Constitutional Committee in Geneva as soon as possible.

=== "Small Group" meeting, May 2022 ===
Members of the "Small Group" responsible for writing the constitution, consisting of 15 representatives from the Syrian Government, non-governmental organizations, and the Syrian opposition, met for the eighth round of talks at a Geneva hotel under UN Special Envoy for Syria Geir Pedersen. There had been a slight breakthrough during the sixth-round meetings in Geneva on October 18–22, when the Syrian Government's delegation co-chair Ahmed Kuzbari sat at the same table for the first time with the co-chair of the opposition Hadi al-Bahra.

=== Syrian opposition offensives and fall of the Assad regime ===
In late November 2024, Syrian opposition groups launched offensives against Assad government forces in northwestern Syria. This led to the collapse of the Assad government in early December, with Assad fleeing to Russia and being granted political asylum. Conflicts amongst armed groups persisted in Syria as of 11 December 2024.

=== Post-Assad negotiations ===
On 24 December 2024, the Syrian caretaker government announced that the country's new de facto leader Ahmed al-Sharaa had met with representatives of the various rebel factions and that an agreement had been reached on the dissolution of all the groups and their integration under the supervision of the ministry of defence. The meeting, however, did not include representatives of the Kurdish-led Syrian Democratic Forces (SDF). Most factions of the Syrian opposition announced that they would merge under the Ministry of Defense. On 31 December, al-Shaara met with SDF representatives in order to "lay the foundations for future dialogue".

On 30 January 2025, the Turkish-supported Syrian Interim Government announced that it was placing itself "at the disposal" of the new authorities in Damascus. On 4 February, shortly after he formally became president of Syria, al-Shaara visited Turkey and met with president Recep Tayyip Erdoğan to discuss, among other issues, the situation of Kurdish-led forces in Syria that Turkey considers to be a security threat. On 12 February, the presidents of the Syrian National Coalition and the Syrian Negotiation Commission met with al-Sharaa. It was announced that both organizations would dissolve within the new authorities, and that the transitional government would form a preparatory committee for the upcoming National Dialogue Conference.

==== 10 March agreement ====
Syrian President Ahmed al Sharaa and Syrian Democratic Forces (SDF) leader Mazloum Abdi agreed to integrate the SDF into the institutions of the Syrian Arab Republic, 10 March 2025.

On 10 March 2025, the Syrian caretaker government and the SDF signed an agreement (Note: Known as the 10 March agreement, March 10 agreement or March agreement.) to integrate the SDF into state institutions and bring northeastern Syria (AANES) under central government control. The agreement was preceded by months long fighting near the Tishrin Dam between the SDF and Turkish-backed SNA. The deal includes a ceasefire, the merging of military forces, and the return of border crossings, airports, and oil fields to Syrian state authority. According to the deal, Kurdish language rights are, for the first time in Syria, officially recognized. The specific eight points of the deal are:

1. political rights of all Syrians with no religious or ethnic discrimination
2. Kurdish society as a component of the Syrian state with citizenship and constitutional rights
3. a ceasefire throughout Syria
4. integration of all AANES civil and military institutions into the Syrian state
5. right of return and protection for displaced Syrians
6. support for the Syrian state against "Assad regime remnants" and all other security and territorial threats
7. rejection of "calls for division" and of hate speech between the components of Syrian society
8. creation of committees to implement the agreement by the end of 2025.

Commander-in-Chief of the SDF, Mazloum Abdi, was reportedly flown by a U.S. helicopter to Damascus to sign the memorandum, underscoring the U.S. role and its 'green light'.

The agreement was welcomed by France and the European Council, among others.

===== Implementation and violations =====
Syrian president Ahmed al-Sharaa announced the 14-point agreement on the ceasefire and the integration of the Syrian Democratic Forces (SDF), which was signed by SDF Commander-in-Chief Mazloum Abdi, 18 January 2026 (Note: Abdi put an electronic signature to the deal.)

On 8 April, pro-Turkey forces started reducing their presence in Afrin Region. This was interpreted by Bedran Kurd, a Kurdish official, as step towards point 5, for enabling the return of displaced residents of Afrin. The SDF aimed at having the replacement security forces be mainly local.

On 12 April, as part of the deal, national Syrian forces arrived at Tishrin Dam, over which military control had changed several times during the civil war. Plans according to the deal included a joint military force to control the dam, without pro-Turkish factions, and a Kurdish civilian administration. As of May 2025, there have been delays in implementing the agreement.

Planned meetings between the SDF and the al-Sharaa government in Paris on 25 July and 9–10 August were cancelled. The al-Sharaa authorities cited the July 2025 southern Syria clashes as a reason for being unable to attend the 25 July meeting and cited the "Unity Conference for North and East Syria" held in al-Hasakah as a reason for not attending the 9–10 August meeting. In late August, Hawar News Agency interpreted Turkish pressure as the reason for the al-Sharaa authorities cancelling the August meeting and viewed the negotiation process as having stalled, with no new meetings between the two sides scheduled.

The Syrian transitional government engaged in various armed altercations with the Syrian Democratic Forces in the months after the agreement, predominantly in Deir ez-Zor province and near the town of Dayr Hafir. Both sides accused the other of violating the March 10 agreement concerning the integration of the Kurdish armed groups into the new Syrian government. Coinciding with the clashes the Foundation for Defense of Democracies warned of a 'wider conflict' if the US does not remain fully engaged in preventing the collapse of the March agreement.

On 21 August 2025, Hawar News Agency reported about "mass dissatisfaction" among citizens concerning hate speech in Syria and calls to implement March 10 agreement.

On 24 August 2025, the SDF reported that "armed groups affiliated with the Damascus government" launched an attack on a military post of the al-Kasra Military Council in the town of al-Junaynah, Deir Ezzor's western countryside, violating the ceasefire.

On 15 October, Abdel Hamid al-Muhbash, co-chair of the DAANES negotiating delegation, stated that security and military committees had been created, had visited Damascus for negotiations, and that the negotiations were progressing. A result of the negotiations was the holding of school exams in North and East Syria. The head of the military negotiating committee, Sipan Hemo, stated that the negotiating atmosphere was "generally positive" but was limited to "verbal promises and general hopes, with no clear or written agreements". Hemo stated that the Transitional Government had not yet created "genuine trust and safety among Syria's various communities" with "serious steps". He stated that the integration of the SDF into the Syrian armed forces would have to "be based on mutual respect and partnership – not on the exclusionary or eliminationist views still present among some in Damascus". Hemo proposed the return of Afrin District residents, compensation for victims, and accountability for the perpetrators of human rights violations as a test of the Transitional Government's willingness to carry out the integration. He stated that the SDF was ready to form "the core nucleus of the new Syrian army", given what he viewed as the SDF's ability to coordinate with "all Syrian communities, including Sunnis, Kurds, Druze, Alawites, Christians," and the Transitional Government.

On 3 November, the Ministry of Education amended the curriculum to label Kurdish and other languages as "foreign", with Arabic remaining the sole exception, marking a violation of the March Agreement. Per its 2023 constitution, DAANES has three official languages: Arabic, Kurdish (Kurmanji) and Syriac.

==== January 2026 agreement ====
On 18 January 2026, Syrian President Ahmed al-Sharaa announced a broad ceasefire agreement with the Kurdish-led SDF during the government's advance in northeastern Syria. The deal was published as a 14-point agreement outlining the terms for a comprehensive ceasefire and integration process. By 30 January, both sides had agreed to withdraw fighters from frontlines, allow government forces into Kurdish strongholds like al-Hasakah and Qamishli, integrate SDF fighters and institutions into state structures, recognize Kurdish civil and educational rights, and permit displaced persons to return.

== See also ==
- Federalization of Syria
- International reactions to the Syrian Civil War
- List of United Nations resolutions concerning Syria
- List of Middle East peace proposals
