= Hadi al-Bahra =

Syrian politician and businessman (born 1959)

- هادي البحرة
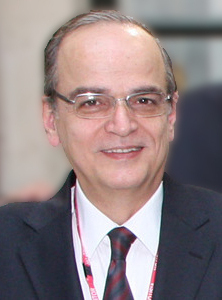
- Al-Bahra in 2013

President of the Syrian National Coalition
- In office 12 September 2023 – 12 February 2025
- Prime Minister: Abdurrahman Mustafa
- Preceded by: Salem al-Meslet
- Succeeded by: Position abolished (Power fully handed over to Ahmed al-Sharaa)
- In office 9 July 2014 – 4 January 2015
- Prime Minister: Ahmad Tu'mah
- Preceded by: Ahmad Jarba
- Succeeded by: Khaled Khoja

Co-Chair of the Syrian Constitutional Committee
- In office 23 September 2019 – 8 December 2024 Serving with Ahmad Kuzbari
- Preceded by: Body established
- Succeeded by: Body abolished

Personal details
- Born: 13 February 1959 (age 67) Damascus, Second Syrian Republic
- Party: Independent
- Other political affiliations: Syrian National Coalition (2013–2025)
- Spouse: Saba Absi
- Children: 2
- Education: Wichita State University (BS)

Hadi al-Bahra (Arabic: هادي البحرة, romanized: Hādī al-Baḥra; born 13 February 1959) is a Syrian politician and businessman who served as President of the National Coalition of Syrian Revolutionary and Opposition Forces, a coalition of Syrian opposition groups established during the Syrian civil war, from 2014 to 2015, and again from 2023 until the coalition’s dissolution in 2025.

== Early life and career ==
Hadi al-Bahra was born on 13 February 1959 in Damascus, Syria, into a Sunni Muslim Arab family. He earned a Bachelor of Science (BS) degree in Industrial Engineering from Wichita State University in the United States.

Prior to the Syrian Revolution and the outbreak of the civil war, al-Bahra spent much of his professional career working in Saudi Arabia. At the age of 24, he was appointed Executive Director of the private Erfan & Bagedo General Hospital in Jeddah, a position he held from 1983 to 1987. From 1987 to 2003, he served as CEO of Ufuk Corporation for Commercial Development, a media and publishing company. Between 2003 and 2005, he was the general manager of Horizon International Exhibitions, a private company based in the Damascus free zone. Subsequently, he worked as CEO of Techno Media from 2005 until 2011. Al-Bahra is fluent in English and has experience in communication systems, display technology, media production, conference organization, and translation systems.

== Syrian civil war ==
During the Syrian civil war, al-Bahra applied his background in communications technology to assist the Syrian opposition in establishing support networks that facilitated communication between Syrian activists and regional as well as international media. He was involved with opposition activities inside Syria, contributing to media efforts, relief operations, and political initiatives.

Al-Bahra joined the National Coalition of Syrian Revolutionary and Opposition Forces during its expansion on 31 May 2013 and was elected general secretary of its political committee. He was appointed as the chief negotiator for the coalition’s delegation to the Geneva II Conference on Syria. On 9 July 2014, he was elected president of the coalition in Istanbul, Turkey, receiving 62 votes compared to 41 for his closest rival, Mouaffaq Nyrabia. He served in this role until January 2015. From 2019, al-Bahra served as co-chairman of the Syrian Constitutional Committee representing the opposition, until the committee became inactive.

In September 2023, al-Bahra was re-elected president of the coalition. According to Syria Direct, his election was influenced by members of the coalition aligned with Turkish interests, notably Abdurrahman Mustafa, prime minister of the Syrian Interim Government, suggesting the coalition was increasingly influenced by Turkey.

Following the fall of the Assad regime in December 2024, al-Bahra called for a political transition consistent with United Nations Security Council Resolution 2554, proposing an 18-month timeline to rebuild institutions and revive Syria’s economy, including six months to draft a new constitution. He relocated to Damascus at the end of December.

On 8 January 2025, al-Bahra met with Syria’s new leader, Ahmed al-Sharaa, at the Presidential Palace in Damascus to discuss future plans for the country. On 12 February, he held another meeting with al-Sharaa and Bader Jamous, president of the Syrian Negotiation Commission. They agreed that both organizations would dissolve under the new Syrian authorities and that the Syrian National Dialogue Conference would take place later that month. Despite his leadership role in the coalition, al-Bahra was not appointed by al-Sharaa to any cabinet position during the formation of the Syrian caretaker government or the initial composition of the Syrian transitional government in March 2025.
