= Vienna peace talks for Syria =

Syria peace talks
- Status: 2015
- Genre: Foreign powers' negotiations aiming for peace in Syria
- Locations: Vienna (Austria), Munich (Germany)
- Attendance: List of attendees: Arab League; China; Egypt; European Union; France; Germany; Iran; Iraq; Italy; Japan; Jordan; Lebanon; Oman; Qatar; Russia; Saudi Arabia; Turkey; United Arab Emirates; United Kingdom; United Nations; United States

The Vienna peace talks for Syria, as of 14 November 2015 known as the talks of the International Syria Support Group (ISSG), were negotiations of foreign powers that began in Vienna, Austria in October 2015 at the level of foreign ministers, to resolve the conflict in Syria, after unsuccessful previous Syrian peace initiatives.

The participants (ISSG) were 20 powers and international organisations: China, Egypt, France, Germany, Iran, Iraq, Italy, Jordan, Lebanon, Oman, Qatar, Russia, Saudi Arabia, Turkey, United Arab Emirates, the United Kingdom, the United States, the Arab League, the European Union, and the United Nations. The Co-Chairs of the ISSG are Russia and the U.S.

== Background ==
Western media claimed that the Russian air strikes that had begun in Syria on 30 September 2015 had tipped the balance of power on the Syrian battlefield between government and opposition in president Assad's favor, thus upending the strategy of the U.S., oppositional groups backed by the U.S. and European allies to drive Assad out of power.

On 23 October 2015, foreign ministers John Kerry of the U.S., Sergey Lavrov of Russia, Adel al-Jubeir of Saudi Arabia and Feridun Sinirlioğlu of Turkey met in Vienna, preparing new international talks aiming at peace in Syria. They agreed to consult with all parties, and aimed to reconvene on 30 October with a broader meeting. Lavrov said afterwards he hoped that Iran and Egypt would be invited.

While both Jubeir and Kerry acknowledged differences with Russia and Iran over the future of Syria's President Bashar al-Assad, Kerry said "if we can get into a political process, then sometimes these things have a way of resolving themselves". On 29 October 2015, the foreign ministers of the U.S., Russia, Turkey and Saudi Arabia again met in Vienna to further prepare the talks of 30 October.

US Secretary of State John Kerry also had meetings with his Austrian counterpart Sebastian Kurz, the UN envoy for Syria Staffan de Mistura, as well as Mohammad Javad Zarif of Iran, Sergey Lavrov of Russia, Adel al-Jubeir of Saudi Arabia, and Feridun Sinirlioğlu of Turkey. Also, Mohammad Javad Zarif of Iran had a bilateral meeting with the High Representative of the European Union for Foreign Affairs and Security Policy, Federica Mogherini. Iran's invitation for 30 October was the first time the country was involved in international Syrian peace negotiations.

== 30 October 2015 round ==
=== Participants ===
Participating in the 30 October Vienna talks were the US, UK, Russia, Iran, Turkey, Egypt, Saudi Arabia, UAE, Qatar, Jordan, China, France, Germany, Italy as well as the European Union. Iran took part in international Syrian peace negotiations for the first time; the offer of inviting Iran had been made by Russia and initially met resistance on the part of the United States and Saudi Arabia. No Syrian representative was invited to participate.

=== Discussions ===
The purpose of the meeting was to look for a plan to convince Syria's government and rebels to agree to a national cease-fire and a process of political transition.

Western media claimed though, that determining Syrian president Assad's future, including what powers he could maintain during a political transition and whether he can compete in a future presidential election, seemed a necessary first step to be taken before any other agreement between the conflicting Syrian parties would be reachable.

The ministers participating in the talks signed a joint statement: Final declaration on the results of the Syria Talks in Vienna as agreed by participants, which among other things stated that "Syria's unity, independence, territorial integrity and secular character are fundamental". The participants agreed to ask the United Nations to convene Syria's government and opposition to start "a political process leading to credible, inclusive, non-sectarian governance, followed by a new constitution and elections" to be administered under UN supervision.

Russia and the US remained at discord concerning the future political role of the Syrian president Bashar al-Assad. The US maintained that Assad should have no role in Syria's future; Russia maintained that Assad should not be forced to go and that Syrian elections should decide who will rule Syria.

=== Aftermath ===
Shortly after the talks in Vienna on 30 October 2015, Saudi Arabian and Iranian officials exchanged sharp rebukes that questioned future participation of Iran in the next round of talks.

Working groups that convened, on the initiative of the US, in the run-up to the 14 November round of talks reflected tensions between Russia and the US over the leadership role allegedly assumed by the US, the very idea of such groups being criticised by Russia.

== 14 November 2015 meeting ==
On 14 November 2015, the Vienna talks, with all twenty members of the ISSG present, resulted in a peace plan for Syria.

The ISSG:

- stated their commitment to ensure a Syrian-led and Syrian-owned political transition based on the 2012 Geneva Communiqué in its entirety;
- agreed to support and work to implement a nationwide ceasefire in Syria to come into effect as soon as the representatives of the Syrian government and the opposition have begun initial steps towards the transition under UN auspices on the basis of the Geneva Communique;
- agreed on the need to convene Syrian government and opposition representatives in formal negotiations under UN auspices with a target date of 1 January 2016;
- assigned a UN special envoy for Syria, Staffan de Mistura, to decide who should represent the opposition in those negotiations;
- reiterated that the Islamic State of Iraq and the Levant (Da'esh) as well as the Jabhat al-Nusra Front, and "other terrorist groups, as designated by the UN Security Council, and further, as agreed by the participants and endorsed by the UN Security Council, must be defeated"; and
- gave Jordan the charge "to help develop among intelligence and military community representatives a common understanding of groups and individuals for possible determination as terrorists, with a target of completion by the beginning of the political process under UN auspices".

Russia and the US remained at discord about a possible role of the Syrian president Bashar al-Assad in any political transition, but their foreign ministers, Lavrov and Kerry, both played down those differences. Kerry suggested the Syrians would decide the fate of Assad: "We did not come here to impose our collective will on the Syrian people", but also said the war "can’t end as long as Bashar Assad is there". Lavrov, however said the conflict, or its solution, is "not about Assad ... ISIS is your enemy".

== December 2015 UN Security Council endorsement ==
After John Kerry visited Moscow where he met his Russian counterpart Sergey Lavrov as well as Vladimir Putin on 15 December 2015, it was announced that on 18 December 2015 world powers would meet in New York to pass a UN resolution endorsing the principles of the Vienna process.

The UN Security Council in its resolution 2254 (2015) of 18 December 2015 which unanimously passed, again commended “a Syrian-led and Syrian-owned political transition based on the Geneva Communiqué” of 30 June 2012, and endorsed the "Vienna Statements" and transitional plan of the ISSG of 30 October and 14 November 2015 (see above):

- A first required step was the UN Secretary General to convene representatives of the Syrian Government and opposition for negotiations on a political process, preferably in January 2016;
- Followed by “credible governance” before July 2016, the drafting of a new constitution, and fair elections under that new constitution before July 2017.

The resolution acknowledged the "role of the ISSG as the central platform to facilitate the United Nations’ efforts to achieve a lasting political settlement in Syria".

The major powers remained divided on who should represent the Syrian opposition.

== Geneva peace talks ==
On 1 February 2016, the United Nations started UN-mediated peace talks for Syria in Geneva. These talks were suspended on 3 February, purportedly because UN envoy Staffan de Mistura did not want the UN to be associated with the Syrian government's military advance against rebels north of Aleppo, backed by Russian airstrikes.

== Munich: 'cessation of hostilities' ==
The ISSG, meeting in Munich, Germany, on 11 and 12 February 2016 agreed on a plan to end hostilities in Syria within a week – provided Syrian President Bashar al-Assad would agree to that, to immediately begin delivering humanitarian aid, and to revive the Geneva peace talks on Syria that were suspended on 3 February. The ISSG reiterated that they were unanimously committed to the full implementation of the UN Security Council Resolution 2254, adopted 18 December 2015.

Russian foreign minister Lavrov emphasized that everyone agreed on the need to destroy ISIL, that talking about ground troops invading Syria would only add fire to the conflict, and called the idea that things in Syria would improve if President Assad would abdicate an illusion. Germany’s foreign minister Steinmeier reportedly said that the US and Russia should coordinate their military actions more closely.

== See also ==
- Friends of Syria Group
- Big Four (Western Europe)
