= United Nations Security Council Resolution 2254 =

UN Security Council Resolution 2254
- Date: 18 December 2015
- Meeting no.: 7588
- Code: S/RES/2254 (Document)
- Subject: Road Map for Peace in Syria
- Voting summary: 15 voted for; None voted against; None abstained; None absent
- Result: Adopted

Security Council composition
- Permanent members: China; France; Russia; United Kingdom; United States
- Non-permanent members: Angola; Chad; Chile; Jordan; Lithuania; Malaysia; New Zealand; Nigeria; Spain; Venezuela

The United Nations Security Council Resolution 2254 was unanimously adopted on 18 December 2015. It calls for a ceasefire and political settlement in Syria. This document describes the roadmap for Syria's political transition.

== The resolution ==
The resolution "demanded" that all parties immediately cease any attacks against civilian targets, it "urged" all Member States to support efforts to achieve a ceasefire and "requested" the U.N. to convene the parties to engage in formal negotiations in early January 2016.

Groups seen as terrorist by the U.N. Security Council, including the Islamic State of Iraq and the Levant and the al-Nusra Front, were excluded. Offensive and defensive actions against such groups would continue. A mechanism to monitor the ceasefire would be set up.

Within 18 months, free and fair elections would be held under U.N. supervision. The political transition would be Syrian-led.

== Aftermath ==
The UN Resolution 2254 was invoked by Iran, Russia and Turkey as the legal basis for the political process required to solve the Syrian conflict, at the first round of the Astana Talks in January 2017.

In December 2024, after Assad's government was overthrown, Syrian National Coalition president Hadi al-Bahra said that he expected the new transitional government to be in line with the resolution.

== See also ==
- List of United Nations resolutions concerning Syria
- Syrian Constitutional Committee
- Syrian Negotiation Commission
