= Syria and the Organisation of Islamic Cooperation =

Syria has had a complex relationship with the Organisation of Islamic Cooperation (OIC), an intergovernmental body representing 57 Muslim-majority and Muslim-populated states. Syria joined the OIC in 1970 but faced suspension in 2012 due to the Syrian civil war and the government’s violent crackdown on civilians.

== History of membership ==
Syria became a member of the OIC in 1970, one year after the organization’s founding in 1969. During its membership, Syria participated in OIC initiatives. Notably, Syria’s capital, Damascus, hosted the 36th Session of the Council of Foreign Ministers in 2009.

=== Suspension of membership ===
Syria’s OIC membership was suspended during the 4th Extraordinary Summit in Mecca on 14–15 August 2012. The decision cited the Syrian government’s use of heavy weapons against civilians and its refusal to engage in peaceful dialogue.

The suspension was supported by all OIC members except Iran, which opposed the move but did not block it. The OIC cited violations of its charter principles, including the obligation to uphold peace and human dignity.

== Political solutions and diplomacy ==
The OIC endorsed the Geneva Communiqué (2012) and UN resolutions advocating for a transitional government in Syria. Secretary-General Yousef Al-Othaimeen emphasized the need for a "durable political solution" to end displacement and violence. The OIC excluded Syria from all meetings and urged member states to isolate the Assad regime diplomatically.

== OIC's humanitarian efforts in Syria ==
Despite the suspension, the OIC has remained engaged in addressing the humanitarian crisis in Syria. The organization has coordinated with international partners to provide aid to those affected by the conflict. In 2017, the OIC welcomed a comprehensive ceasefire agreement in Syria, expressing hope that it would lead to a lasting political solution.

Similarly, in 2018 OIC had also called for ceasefires and humanitarian aid access, as they welcomed the UN Security Council’s Resolution 2401 (2018), which demanded a 30-day truce in Syria.

== Syria's attempts to re-engage with the OIC ==
In January 2025, the Syrian government has sought to restore its standing within the OIC. In October 2023, the Speaker of the People's Assembly, Hammouda Sabbagh, participated via video in an emergency meeting of the Parliamentary Union of the OIC Member States (PUIC) to discuss developments in the Palestinian territories. This move was interpreted by some as an attempt by Syria to signal its reintegration into the OIC.

== Aftermath ==
The suspension highlighted tensions between Saudi Arabia and Iran within the OIC. Iran, a key Syrian ally, criticized the decision as politically motivated, reflecting broader Sunni-Shia rivalries.

Analysts argue the suspension exposed the OIC’s vulnerability to geopolitical rivalries, undermining its claim to represent unified Muslim interests.

The suspension limited Syria’s ability to influence OIC resolutions on regional issues, such as the Palestinian cause or the Rohingya crisis.

== Restoration of membership ==
On March 7, 2025, Syria officially restored a full membership after fall of the Assad regime.
