= Gerald Weaver =

American novelist

- Born: Gerald Willard Weaver II; June 15, 1958 (age 68); Pennsylvania, U.S.
- Education: Yale University (BA); Catholic University of America (JD)
- Occupations: Lawyer, writer
- Political party: Democratic
- Spouse(s): Katherine Brewer (1981-2003); Lily L. Chu

Gerald Willard Weaver II (born June 15, 1958) is an American author and former lawyer and lobbyist. He was the youngest chief of staff in Congress in 1983, aged 26. His novel, Gospel Prism, came to light when the American-born British journalist, Marie Colvin died whilst covering the Siege of Homs in Syria, February 22, 2012. Her backpack, when recovered, was found to contain basic supplies: a change of clothes, two satellite phones and Weaver's manuscript.

== Early years ==
Weaver was born in Western Pennsylvania in 1958, where he grew up with three sisters. His father was a lawyer and his mother worked until he was five before she became a homemaker. He spoke the Sicilian language with his grandmother who was also his nanny until he was five. Weaver went on to attend Yale University and the Columbus School of Law.

== Education and career ==
Weaver has a Bachelor of Arts degree from Yale University, where he studied Fiction Writing under Gordon Lish, who was the fiction editor at Esquire magazine and Raymond Carver's editor. Weaver studied Literature at Yale under the literary critic Harold Bloom. Weaver also has a Juris Doctor degree from the Columbus School of Law.

Weaver managed his first Congressional campaign in 1982 when Congressman Joseph Kolter appointed Weaver as his chief of staff, a position he held until May 1987. In 1992, Weaver testified before the United States Senate Committee on the Judiciary Subcommittee on Patents, Copyrights and Trademarks.

Weaver was appointed Vice President of Government Affairs at satellite carrier United Video in 1990. United Video was the distributor of Chicago independent television channel WGN, a company which aired games of the Chicago Cubs and the White Sox. During his appointment, he represented the company in a high-profile battle against the professional sports leagues attempting to revoke a copyright provision known as the compulsory license.

Cable World magazine reported that during their campaign Weaver carried a baseball bat to the mark-up of H.R. 4511, the cable compulsory license bill, as a gift for Rep. William J. Hughes (D-NJ). Weaver went on to send each member of the House Judiciary Committee a Monopoly game with a letter stating there was only one Major League Baseball.

The compulsory licence was ultimately retained by Weaver for United Video and remains in place.

Weaver ran his own lobbying firm, representing Gundle Inc, First Lithotripsy Group, Duquesne Light Company (DQE) and Zambelli Fireworks, the largest and oldest fireworks display company in the United States. He practiced law in Pennsylvania until 1994 when he was disbarred due to his criminal conviction.

== Political life ==
Weaver has called politics, "Socialising with a consequence." In 1983, at the age of 26, he was the youngest ever chief of staff in Congress. Weaver was an aide to U.S. Rep. Joseph P. Kolter from January 1982 – May 1987.

=== Criminal indictment ===
In 1992 Weaver was indicted on 22 counts, all but one arising from his involvement in the Congressional Post Office scandal. On March 31, 1993 Weaver pleaded guilty, pursuant to a negotiated plea agreement, to one count each of obstruction of justice, conspiracy to distribute cocaine and distribution of cocaine. Weaver's 24-month sentence was reduced to "time served" or 16 months, when he filed a motion to change counsel and the judge received notice of Mundy's conflict of interest. Weaver had contended his guilty plea should be set aside because it was "tainted" by the conflict of interest created by his former lawyer, R. Kenneth Mundy's simultaneous representation of both Weaver and Rostenkowski. Weaver filed a petition pursuant to 28 U.S.C. s 2255 seeking to have his guilty plea set aside on the ground that his former lawyer, R. Kenneth Mundy, had had a conflict of interest. The district court concluded that, while Mundy's simultaneous representation of Weaver and of then U.S. Rep. Daniel D. Rostenkowski, against whom Weaver was a potential witness, created a conflict, Weaver had not shown the necessary prejudice to establish an ineffective assistance of counsel claim. Rostenkowski was indicted on May 31, 1994 and on July 5. Weaver was given a two-year prison sentence for conspiracy to distribute cocaine on the Hill. He later said that, "In prison, you have to avoid three things: violence, boredom and dissipation.".'

== Relationship with Marie Colvin ==
Marie Colvin is widely acknowledged as the leading war correspondent of her generation for her work across the Middle East and in Sri Lanka, East Timor, Chechnya and Kosovo. The relationship between Weaver and Colvin was first reported in 2012 and reported again in 2015 when Weaver spoke out about the reasons for publishing his novel, Gospel Prism. The pair met at Yale University in 1975. He describes Colvin as his, 'childhood sweetheart'. Colvin was killed in the besieged Baba Amr district of the Syrian city of Homs and for a short time was buried in a garden close to the building in which she and the French photographer Rémi Ochlik died. On learning of Colvin's death, Weaver is reported to have said he, ‘drank for five straight days’. When Colvin's body was exhumed for repatriation to her native Oyster Bay, New York, her personal possessions came with her. This included a backpack containing basic supplies: a change of clothes, two satellite phones and a weighty black box with a 387-page manuscript inside. Colvin's sister, Cathleen 'Cat' Colvin set about looking for the author, a man Marie first met at a Yale University party 37 years earlier. On finding him and along with Sean Ryan, then Editor of The Sunday Times, she helped Gerald Weaver to find a publisher. ‘Gospel Prism’ is published by London Wall Publishing. Jane Graham, The Big Issue, called it "a rollicking good read." 22 June 2015.

== Gospel Prism ==
According to Weaver, Gospel Prism draws on literary classics such as Dante's Inferno and Shakespeare's The Merchant of Venice to tell the story of a man in prison. The world of Gospel Prism is multi-layered. On its surface it is a humorous, graphic, informative and entertaining story of one man's mission to make the most out of a short term in prison and it seamlessly becomes a spiritual detective mystery. It contains within its pages a love story, a heroic last stand, a droll and loving friendship, a beautiful mixed race messiah, a search for lost time, a trip to Hell, some negotiating between a fallen rabbi and the mafia and several other adventures. The novel's protagonist is tasked to discover twelve life lessons from each adventure, or they may even be spiritual verities. And it is possible that these principles may be found in or may refer to works by Shakespeare, Cervantes, Milton, Tolstoy and others. Weaver said, "Readers, and particularly deep readers, may be a dwindling species or even become something not unlike a religious cult. The relationship between religious faith and the written word is a part of the world of Gospel Prism as much as it is a fact of life. William Blake has said that we may have been choosing forms of worship from poetic tales, and if this is the case then it may be time to look closely at all poetic tales."

== The First First Gentleman ==
Weaver's second novel, The First First Gentleman, London Wall, August 2016, "is a timely story of the first female President of the United States, an iconoclastic woman who challenges what we know about cultural and political orthodoxies and who may also have to breastfeed during her term" of office. Weaver has said, "when I began to write The First First Gentleman more than three years ago, some American voters have been ready for some time for a politician who is willing to tear down the old icons." The novel was mostly drawn from Weaver's thirteen years in national politics and on Capitol Hill, and from the rest of a lifetime of observing national politics from a front row seat. "The elephant in the room, of course, is misogyny and we don't talk about it," Weaver has said. The novel is a love story, a political and social satire, and a tribute to the novels of Charles Dickens. This Dickensian quality was noted in at least one review, Gerald Weaver's writing is incredibly sharp – it doesn't lose focus anywhere. "I quickly found myself quite strongly attached to both Melinda and Garth, hoping that they would come out on top, and groaning when things started not to go their way . . ." "One day, women will be in charge," Weaver told BBC London. Weaver says that his purpose was not to tell a story that corresponds with Clinton herself but to hasten the arrival of what he sees as a tipping point of more females coming into power.

== The Girl and the Sword ==
In 2023, Weaver released The Girl and the Sword, a historical novel set in the early thirteenth century. The novel follows the journey of Pauline de Pamiers, a young girl from a Cathar family in France who survives the Cathar Crusade and forms a bond with one of the crusaders, Simon de Montfort. The two travel to England, where Pauline helps Simon rise in power to become the Earl of Leicester. The novel explores their relationship, Simon's power struggles with King Henry III, and Pauline's role in the history of England. In an interview with BBC Radio London, Weaver said he "wanted to create a strong female character in this historical context that modern readers can relate to."

== Family life ==
Weaver married Katherine Brewer in 1981. They had two children, Harriet and Simon and in 1992 they moved from Capitol Hill to Wexford, Pennsylvania following Weaver's release from prison. Weaver became a full-time stay-at-home dad. Weaver and Brewer divorced in 2003. Weaver lives in Bethesda, MD with his second wife, Lily. Weaver is a member of the Yale Football Association, the Society of Authors (UK), and he and his wife are patron members of the Yale University Art Gallery, and of the Freer/Sackler Smithsonian Museum of Asian Art.
