= Paul Conroy (journalist) =

British photographer (1964–2026)

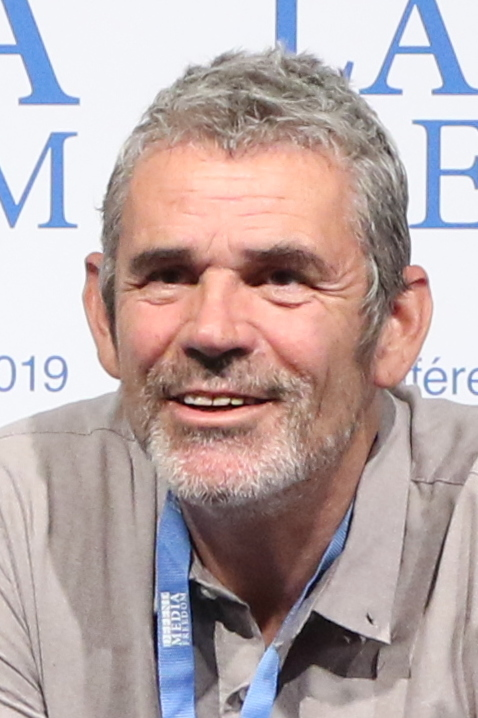
- Conroy in 2019
- Born: 18 July 1964; Liverpool, England
- Died: 28 February 2026 (aged 61)
- Occupations: Freelance photographer; Filmmaker
- Spouse: Kate Baird (m. 1998)
- Children: 3
- Military career
- Allegiance: United Kingdom
- Branch: Royal Artillery
- Service years: 1980–1987
- Rank: Gunner

Paul Conroy (18 July 1964 – 28 February 2026) was a British freelance photographer and filmmaker who worked in the British media. A soldier with the Royal Artillery between 1980 and 1987, he worked extensively as a journalist in combat zones, producing footage from conflicts in the Balkans, the Middle East, and Libya. In 2011, he was shortlisted for the PRX Bayeux TV report along with Marie Colvin, a war correspondent with The Sunday Times.

== Early life ==
Conroy was born in Liverpool on 18 July 1964, to Les Conroy and his wife Joan (née Mountain). He has two surviving brothers and a sister.

== 2011–2012 Syrian uprising ==
On 22 February 2012 during the Syrian uprising, Conroy was injured while covering events from the Syrian city of Homs, a stronghold of Syrian opposition forces, after the building where he and other journalists were based was shelled by Syrian government forces. Marie Colvin and French photojournalist Rémi Ochlik were killed in the attack, while Conroy was injured along with another journalist, French reporter Édith Bouvier of Le Figaro.

Conroy suffered leg injuries in the attack and was subsequently smuggled out of the city and across the Syrian border to Lebanon. Avaaz coordinated the evacuation out of the city, but about twenty Syrian activists died during the evacuation operation.

French President Nicolas Sarkozy described the killing of Colvin and Ochlik as an assassination. It is believed that the journalists were targeted. The editor of The Sunday Times said he believed his reporter had been targeted. Conroy later described the situation in Homs as an "indiscriminate massacre" and "slaughter" and compared it to the destruction inflicted on Grozny during the Chechen Wars.

Conroy later wrote a book covering the events. In the film A Private War, he was portrayed by Jamie Dornan.

== Personal life and death ==
Conroy married Katherine Joye Baird in Fort William, Highland, Scotland in 1998. They had three sons together. He was a supporter of Liverpool Football Club.

Conroy died from a heart attack on 28 February 2026, at the age of 61.
