= A Private War =

2018 biographical film about war journalist Marie Colvin

- Theatrical release poster
- Directed by: Matthew Heineman
- Written by: Arash Amel
- Based on: "Marie Colvin's Private War" by Marie Brenner
- Produced by: Matthew George; Matthew Heineman; Basil Iwanyk; Marissa McMahon; Charlize Theron
- Starring: Rosamund Pike; Jamie Dornan; Tom Hollander; Stanley Tucci
- Cinematography: Robert Richardson
- Edited by: Nick Fenton
- Music by: H. Scott Salinas
- Production companies: Acacia Filmed Entertainment; Savvy Media Holdings; Thunder Road Pictures; Denver and Delilah Productions; The Fyzz Facility; LB Entertainment; Kamala Films; Bloom
- Distributed by: Aviron Pictures
- Release dates: September 7, 2018 (TIFF); November 2, 2018 (United States)
- Running time: 110 minutes
- Country: United States
- Language: English
- Budget: $18.8 million
- Box office: $3.9 million

A Private War is a 2018 American biographical war drama film directed by Matthew Heineman, and starring Rosamund Pike as journalist Marie Colvin. The film is based on the 2012 article "Marie Colvin’s Private War" in Vanity Fair by Marie Brenner. The film was written by Arash Amel and features Jamie Dornan, Tom Hollander and Stanley Tucci.

The film premiered at the 2018 Toronto International Film Festival and was released in the United States on November 2, 2018. It received positive reviews from critics, who praised Pike's performance. At the 76th Golden Globe Awards, the film earned nominations for Best Actress in a Motion Picture – Drama (Pike) and Best Original Song ("Requiem for A Private War"), while director Matthew Heineman received a nomination for Outstanding Directorial Achievement of a First Time Feature Film Director from the Directors Guild of America.

== Plot ==
Marie Colvin is a celebrated American war correspondent writing for the London-based Sunday Times.

In 2001, Marie's editor, Sean Ryan, tries to send her to Palestine for a story on Yasser Arafat, but she refuses, as she already has an interview scheduled in Sri Lanka with a Tamil rebel leader. In an attack by government forces, she attempts to surrender, but comes under fire; wounded, she loses the use of her left eye. While recovering in hospital, despite being shaken and weak, she sits up in bed to dictate a report from her handwritten notes.

At home in London, Marie has recurring nightmares about her wartime experiences, one about a small girl's lifeless body lying on Marie's own bed in particular. Her friends convince her to start wearing an eyepatch to cover her damaged eye. At a gala, she is presented with an award as British foreign correspondent of the year. She and her partner, David, a former war correspondent now writing a novel, argue about her constantly leaving to work in the field.

In 2003, Marie goes to Iraq. She meets war photographer Paul Conroy and recruits him to go with her to investigate a reported mass grave outside Fallujah of civilians murdered by Saddam Hussein's forces, bluffing her way through an Iraqi checkpoint to get there. She writes a gripping account of the discovery.

Back home again, now living alone, Marie continues to have the same nightmares. Her friend Rita convinces her she needs treatment for PTSD. While in a psychiatric hospital, Marie has a deep conversation about her motivations with Paul, who tells her he, too, has been treated for PTSD.

After a tour in Afghanistan with Paul in 2009, during which she reports on the effects of the fighting there on civilians, she is back in London in 2011 when she meets and begins a relationship with international businessman Tony Shaw.

That same year, Marie and Paul go to Libya to witness the uprising against dictator Muammar Gaddafi. Sean warns Marie not to go to the front, because reporters are being targeted; when she learns that an RPG attack has killed a colleague, photographer Norm Coburn, she is shaken, as they have had a long-time professional relationship. Marie has a face-to-face interview with Gaddafi, whom she has interviewed in the past; when she denounces his brutal treatment of the Libyan people, he evades the issue by expressing personal affection for her. The next time she sees him, he has died a violent death at the hands of his former subjects.

In 2012, Marie and Paul go to Syria to cover that country's civil war. In Homs, they find 28,000 men, women, and children caught in the crossfire with insufficient food and medical services as the government bombards the city, claiming to be firing on terrorists. Marie files a report telling the true story, and Paul sends corroborating videos. When told they have to leave to avoid an imminent assault by government troops, Marie refuses; she gets Sean to arrange a live broadcast on CNN so she can inform the public about what is actually happening in the city, telling the world this is the worst conflict she has ever seen as Paul looks on in admiration. When it becomes clear the attacking force has discovered their location, Paul convinces Marie that they have to flee, but the street they must run in is peppered with explosions. Paul survives the attack, but when he finds Marie amid the rubble on the ground, she is dead.

== Cast ==
- Rosamund Pike as Marie Colvin
- Jamie Dornan as Paul Conroy
- Tom Hollander as Sean Ryan, The Sunday Times' foreign editor and Marie's boss
- Nikki Amuka-Bird as Rita Williams, Marie's friend
- Faye Marsay as Kate Richardson
- Greg Wise as Professor David Irens
- Corey Johnson as Norm Coburn, another photographer
- Stanley Tucci as Tony Shaw
- Fady Elsayed as Mourad

== Production ==
The film was produced in Jordan and London, and was shot by Robert Richardson. It features an original song by Annie Lennox, entitled "Requiem for A Private War".

== Release ==
In February 2018, Aviron Pictures acquired distribution rights to the film. The film had its world premiere at the 2018 Toronto International Film Festival on September 7, 2018, and had its European premiere at the Mayor's Gala in the BFI London Film Festival. It also screened at the Mill Valley Film Festival, Hamptons International Film Festival, and the Woodstock Film Festival. The film was released on November 2, 2018, in limited release, before expanding nationwide on November 16, 2018. A Private War was released in the UK and Ireland on 15 February 2019.

== Reception ==
=== Critical response ===
On Rotten Tomatoes, it has an approval rating of 87%, based on 147 reviews, and the average score is 7.1/10. The website's critical consensus reads: "A Private War honors its real-life subject with a sober appraisal of the sacrifices required of journalists on the front lines—and career-best work by Rosamund Pike." On review aggregator Metacritic, the film has a weighted average score of 75 out of 100 based on 32 critics.

Peter Debruge of Variety called it "an incredibly sophisticated, psychologically immersive" film.

=== Accolades ===
Year	Award	Category	Nominee(s)	Result	Ref.
2018	Golden Globe Awards	Best Actress in a Motion Picture – Drama	Rosamund Pike	Nominated	
2018	Golden Globe Awards	Best Original Song	"Requiem for A Private War" by Annie Lennox	Nominated	
2018	Satellite Awards	Best Independent Film	A Private War	Nominated	
2018	Satellite Awards	Best Actress in a Motion Picture, Drama	Rosamund Pike	Nominated	
2018	Satellite Awards	Best Original Song	"Requiem for A Private War" by Annie Lennox	Nominated	
2018	Directors Guild of America Awards	Outstanding Directing – First-Time Feature Film	Matthew Heineman	Nominated	
