= Ali Mahmoud Othman =

Syrian journalist

Ali Othman
- Born: 1978 (age 47–48); Syria
- Occupation: journalist

Ali Mahmoud Othman (Arabic: علي محمود عثمان, born 1978) is a Syrian citizen journalist and activist from Homs. He is nicknamed the "Eyes of Baba Amr" and "Jeddo" (Grandfather).

== Baba Amr Press Office ==
Othman originally sold vegetables, but turned to journalism in the Syrian uprising. He became the head of a media centre in Homs, Baba Amro News, which provided footage and content to satellite TV channels, news outlets and foreign journalists working in Syria, including Al Jazeera, Al Arabiya, CNN, BBC, Sky News and TRT.

He gained prominence when he highlighted the shelling of Homs. The centre was in a privileged location because it had internet access and a generator to provide electricity. It is claimed that Othman's footage was the first to be made available.

Paul Conroy said Othman "was one of the activists who just made things happen at the media centre. He would take journalists to the front line or to field hospitals, or anywhere where they would be able to get a good camera shot."

== Shelling ==
The Baba Amro News office was shelled twice; both times with Othman present. He filmed the first shelling and helped carry the injured to safety.

In the second shelling more than ten rockets hit the office. Foreign journalists Marie Colvin and Rémi Ochlik were killed while they were attempting to escape. Othman was instrumental in the evacuation of the three remaining journalists from Homs, including Paul Conroy who was seriously injured. However Othman refused to leave the city himself after the Syrian army regained control.

A Libération journalist said the Syrian Army were fully aware the media centre was broadcasting evidence of crimes against humanity, and they were planning to deliberately shell the office. Doing so would mean there would be "no more information coming out of Homs".

== Arrest ==
Ali Mahmoud Othman was arrested in Aleppo by government forces in March 2012, after being lured to a certain place by a text message. On April 25, 2012 Addounia TV aired an interview with him that was believed to be a forced confession. He is considered to be at risk of torture. It is unknown where he is being held, but he is suspected to be in Aleppo. Amnesty International, Reporters Without Borders, Randa Habib, John McCain, and William Hague have all called for his release.

== Possible death ==
In 2019 his family were told he died in detention on 30 December 2013. His family are seeking official confirmation of his death and return of his body.
