= Juan Carlos Gumucio =

Bolivian journalist (1949–2002)

Juan Carlos Gumucio Quiroga (November 7, 1949 – February 25, 2002) was a Bolivian-born journalist and writer, and the second husband of Marie Colvin.

== Career ==
Gumucio worked as a journalist for over 30 years, having started his career in his hometown, Cochabamba, as a crime reporter for Los Tiempos and Radio Centro. During the early 1970s, Gumucio was forced to leave his native Bolivia for Argentina following a military coup. Due to his involvement with activism in left-wing politics, he was unable to return to Bolivia and moved to Washington where he worked for a period as a political attaché in the Bolivian embassy in the United States and as press secretary for the Organization of American States before joining the Associated Press news agency in New York as a reporter. He was later posted to Rome, Tehran and Beirut. When AP ordered its foreign staff to leave Lebanon, after its bureau chief Terry Anderson had been kidnapped, Juan Carlos joined The Times and afterwards the Spanish daily El País, as its Middle East correspondent.

Gumucio was one of the few Western journalists to remain in West Beirut after the hostage crisis reached its height. Most of the foreign press corps fled in 1986.

Robert Fisk would later describe Gumucio as "a big man with the energy of a hyperactive puppy dog and a deceptively mild, bland humour that concealed a dark understanding of his colleagues' weaknesses".

== Personal life ==
Gumucio was the son of Azul Quiroga and architect René Gumucio, from an old-established and once affluent family. When Juan Carlos was three, his father, an architect, left to live in California. His mother Azul Quiroga later remarried into the aristocratic Patiño family (see Simón Iturri Patiño).

Gumucio was involved in left-wing politics in Bolivia and was forced to leave for Argentina following a military coup. He had a daughter, Mónica, with his first wife but was, due to his political involvement, deemed unsuitable and dangerous by his family-in-law. He was separated from his wife and child. He met third wife Agneta Ramberg, with whom he had his second daughter, in Beirut during the Lebanese Civil War, and his fourth wife, Marie Colvin, in Jerusalem in 1996.

In 1994, he went to Jerusalem, for El País. He was named Spain's journalist of the year in 1995. Gumucio, who was known for his risque sense of humor and relentless reporting, was able to smuggle himself into Kosovo, after foreign journalists were denied entry, by posing as a "visiting professor of sociology" who wished to "show solidarity with the Serb people". He was promptly whisked to Belgrade, where he calmly delivered a speech at the university. El Pais later moved him to London.

In late 2000, he returned to Cochabamba, where he became visiting Lecturer of Journalism at the university, before retiring to a village 16 kilometres (10 mi) away.

After many years of battling depression and alcoholism, Gumucio, 52, died from a self-inflicted gunshot wound 16 km (10 mi) outside of Cochabamba, Bolivia, on February 25, 2002.
