= Marie Colvin =

American war correspondent (1956–2012)

- Born: Marie Catherine Colvin; January 12, 1956; New York City, U.S.
- Died: February 22, 2012 (aged 56); Homs, Syria
- Cause of death: Bombardment
- Education: Yale University (BA)
- Occupation: War correspondent
- Years active: 1979–2012
- Spouse(s): Patrick Bishop (divorced) Juan Carlos Gumucio (m. 1996; died 2002)
- Website: mariecolvin.org

Marie Catherine Colvin (January 12, 1956 – February 22, 2012) was an American journalist who worked as a foreign affairs correspondent for the British newspaper The Sunday Times from 1985 until her death. She was one of the most prominent war correspondents of her generation, widely recognized for her extensive coverage on the frontlines of various conflicts across the globe. On February 22, 2012, while she was covering the siege of Homs alongside the French photojournalist Rémi Ochlik; the pair were killed in a targeted attack by Syrian government forces.

After her death, Stony Brook University established the Marie Colvin Center for International Reporting in her honor. Her family also established the Marie Colvin Memorial Fund through the Long Island Community Foundation, which strives to give donations in Marie's name in honor of her humanitarianism.

In July 2016, lawyers representing Colvin's family filed a civil action against the Syrian Arab Republic in the US District Court for the District of Columbia, claiming they had obtained proof that the Syrian government had directly ordered her assassination. In a verdict issued in 2019, the Columbia District Court found the Assad regime guilty of "extrajudicial killing", terming it as an "unconscionable crime" deliberately committed by the government, and mandated Syria to pay Colvin's family $302 million in compensation for the damages. In 2025, the French government issued arrest warrants for Bashar al-Assad and other high ranking Ba’athist Syrian officials.

== Early life and education ==
Marie Colvin was born on January 12, 1956, in Astoria, Queens, New York. She grew up in East Norwich in the town of Oyster Bay, Nassau County, on Long Island. Her father, William J. Colvin, was a Marine Corps veteran of World War II and an English teacher in New York City public schools. He was also active in Democratic politics in Nassau County. He served as Deputy County Executive under Eugene Nickerson. Her mother, Rosemarie Marron Colvin, was a high school guidance counselor in Long Island public schools. Marie has two brothers, William and Michael, and two sisters, Aileen and Catherine. She graduated from Oyster Bay High School in 1974, spending her junior year of high school abroad on an exchange program in Brazil and later attended Yale University. She was an anthropology major but took a course with the Pulitzer Prize-winning writer John Hersey.

Colvin also started writing for the Yale Daily News "and decided to be a journalist," her mother said. She graduated with a bachelor's degree in anthropology in 1978. During her time at Yale, Colvin was known for her strong personality and quickly established herself as a "noise-maker" on campus.

== Career ==
Colvin worked briefly for a labor union in New York City, before starting her journalism career with United Press International (UPI), a year after graduating from Yale. She worked for UPI first in Trenton, then New York and Washington. In 1984, Colvin was appointed Paris bureau manager for UPI, before moving to The Sunday Times in 1985.

From 1986, she was the newspaper's Middle East correspondent, and then from 1995 was the Foreign Affairs correspondent. In 1986, she was the first to interview Libyan leader Muammar Gaddafi after Operation El Dorado Canyon. Gaddafi said in this interview that he was at home when U.S. planes bombed Tripoli in April 1986, and that he helped rescue his wife and children while "the house was coming down around us". Gaddafi also said reconciliation between Libya and the United States was impossible so long as Ronald Reagan was in the White House. "I have nothing to say to him (Reagan)", he said, "because he is mad. He is foolish. He is an Israeli dog."

In May 1988, Colvin made an extended appearance on the Channel 4 discussion programme After Dark, alongside Anton Shammas, Gerald Kaufman, Moshe Amirav, Nadia Hijab and others.

Specialising in the Middle East, she also covered conflicts in Chechnya, Serbia, Sierra Leone, Zimbabwe, Sri Lanka and East Timor. In 1999 in East Timor, she was credited with saving the lives of 1,500 women and children from a compound besieged by Indonesian-backed forces. Refusing to abandon them, she stayed with a United Nations force, reporting in her newspaper and on television. They were evacuated after four days. She won the International Women's Media Foundation award for Courage in Journalism for her coverage of Kosovo and Chechnya. She wrote and produced documentaries, including Arafat: Behind the Myth for the BBC. She is featured in the 2005 documentary film Bearing Witness.

Colvin lost the sight in her left eye while reporting on the Sri Lankan Civil War. She was struck by a blast from a Sri Lankan Army rocket-propelled grenade (RPG) on April 16, 2001, while crossing from a Tamil Tigers-controlled area to a Government-controlled area; thereafter she wore an eyepatch. She was attacked even after calling out "journalist, journalist!" She told Lindsey Hilsum of Channel 4 News that her attacker "knew what he was doing". Despite sustaining serious injuries, Colvin, who was 45 at the time, managed to write a 3,000 word article on time to meet the deadline. She had walked over 30 miles (48 km) through the Vanni jungle with her Tamil guides to evade government troops; she reported on the humanitarian disaster in the northern Tamil region, including a government blockade of food, medical supplies and prevention of foreign journalist access to the area for six years to cover the war. Colvin later suffered post traumatic stress disorder and required hospitalisation following her injuries.

She was also a witness and an intermediary during the final days of the war in Sri Lanka and reported on war crimes against Tamils that were committed during this phase. Several days after her wounding, the Sri Lankan government said it would allow foreign journalists to travel in rebel-held zones. The director of Government information, Ariya Rubasinghe, stated that: "Journalists can go, we have not debarred them, but they must be fully aware of and accept the risk to their lives."

In 2011, while reporting on the Arab Spring in Tunisia, Egypt and Libya, she was offered an opportunity to interview Gaddafi again, along with two other journalists that she could nominate. For Gaddafi's first international interview since the start of the war, Colvin took along Christiane Amanpour of ABC News and Jeremy Bowen of BBC News.

Colvin noted the importance of shining a light on "humanity in extremes, pushed to the unendurable", stating: "My job is to bear witness. I have never been interested in knowing what make of plane had just bombed a village or whether the artillery that fired at it was 120mm or 155mm."

== Personal life ==
Colvin twice married journalist Patrick Bishop; both marriages ended in divorce. She also married a Bolivian journalist, Juan Carlos Gumucio, a correspondent for the Spanish newspaper El País in Beirut during the Lebanese Civil War. He took his own life in February 2002 in Bolivia, following depression and alcoholism.

Colvin lived in Hammersmith, West London.

== Death ==
Districts in Homs listed on the map saw fighting or shelling during February 2012

In February 2012, Colvin crossed into Syria on the back of a motocross motorcycle, ignoring the Syrian government's attempts to prevent foreign journalists from entering Syria to cover the Syrian Civil War without authorization. Colvin was stationed in the western Baba Amr district of the city of Homs. Upon arriving the city, she was welcomed by local activists keen to reveal the ongoing destruction of Homs to the world. Colvin reported that pro-Assad forces were repeatedly firing on her car with grenades and machine guns, forcing her to take cover in emptied buildings. In her last article published in the Sunday Times on 19 February 2012, Colvin wrote:

"The scale of human tragedy in the city is immense. The inhabitants are living in terror. Almost every family seems to have suffered the death or injury of a loved one."

Colvin made her last broadcast on the evening of February 21, appearing on the BBC, Channel 4, CNN and ITN News via satellite phone. She described "merciless" shelling and sniper attacks against civilian buildings and people on the streets of Homs by Syrian forces, expressing immense shock at the utter disregard of the government troops for the lives of the city residents. Speaking to Anderson Cooper hours before her death, Colvin described the bombardment of Homs as the worst conflict she had ever experienced. Reporting on her situation, Colvin told Cooper:

"Every civilian house on this street has been hit. We're talking about a very poor popular neighborhood. The top floor of the building I'm in has been hit, in fact, totally destroyed. There are no military targets here... There are rockets, shells, tank shells, anti-aircraft being fired in parallel lines into the city. The Syrian Army is simply shelling a city of cold, starving civilians."

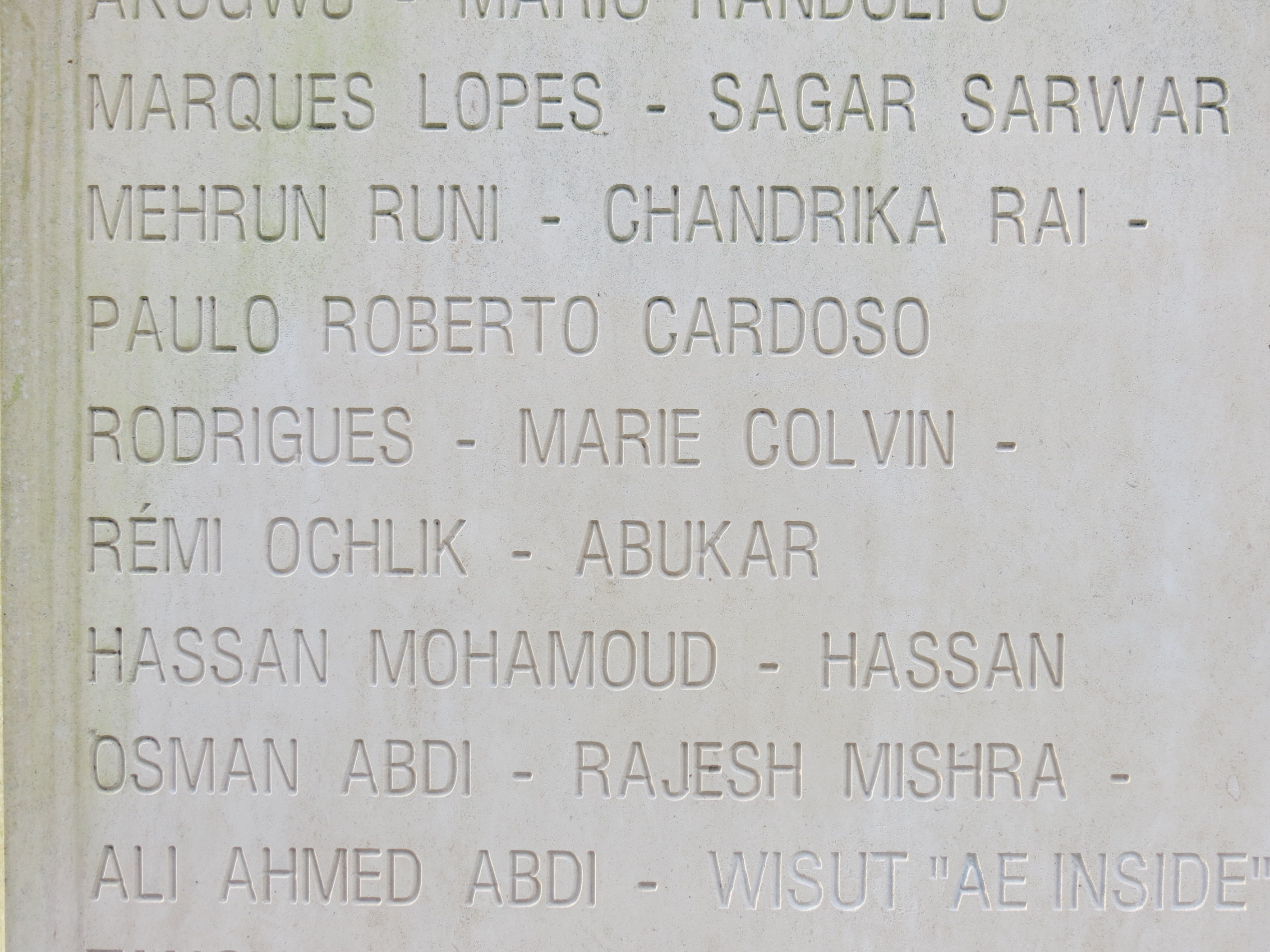
Marie Colvin's name, Reporters' Memorial(fr), Bayeux.

Colvin and photojournalist Rémi Ochlik were killed by direct shelling and rocket attacks from security forces directed at their temporary media center on February 22. Another photographer, Paul Conroy, and French journalist Edith Bouvier of Le Figaro were also injured during the attacks. The nature of the attacks aroused suspicions that the Syrian government deliberately bombed the safehouses of the journalists through satellite tracking. Nine other individuals were also killed as a result of the attacks.

An autopsy conducted in Damascus by the Syrian government claimed that Colvin was killed by an "improvised explosive device filled with nails". This account was rejected by photographer Paul Conroy, who was with Colvin and Ochlik and survived the attack. Conroy recalled that Colvin and Ochlik were packing their gear when Syrian artillery fire hit their media centre.

=== Reactions ===
Journalist Jean-Pierre Perrin and other sources reported that the building had been targeted by the Syrian Army, identified using satellite phone signals. Their team had been planning an exit strategy a few hours prior.

On the evening of February 22, 2012, people of Homs mourned in the streets in honour of Colvin and Ochlik. Tributes were paid to Colvin across the media industry and political world following her death.

Colvin's personal possessions came with her. This included a backpack containing basic supplies and a 387-page manuscript by her lifelong friend, Gerald Weaver. Colvin's sister, Cathleen 'Cat' Colvin along with Sean Ryan, then foreign editor of The Sunday Times, helped to have his book published.

Colvin's funeral took place in Oyster Bay, New York, on March 12, 2012, in a service attended by 300 mourners, including those who had followed her dispatches, friends and family. She was cremated and half of her ashes were scattered off Long Island, and the other half on the River Thames, near her last home.

== Civil lawsuit ==
In July 2016, Cat Colvin, Marie's younger sister, filed a civil action against the government of the Syrian Arab Republic for extrajudicial killing claiming she had obtained proof that the Syrian government had directly ordered Colvin's targeted assassination. In April 2018, the accusations were revealed on court papers filed by her family. In January 2019, an American court ruled that the Syrian government was liable for Colvin's death and ordered that they pay $300m in punitive damages. The judgement stated that Colvin was "specifically targeted because of her profession, for the purpose of silencing those reporting on the growing opposition movement in the country. [The] murder of journalists acting in their professional capacity could have a chilling effect on reporting such events worldwide. A targeted murder of an American citizen, whose courageous work was not only important, but vital to our understanding of war zones and of wars generally, is outrageous, and therefore a punitive damages award that multiples the impact on the responsible state is warranted."

In 2025, a court in France issued an arrest warrant for former Syrian president Bashar al-Assad and six other officials of his regime over the attack that killed Colvin and Ochlik.

== In popular culture ==
In 2018, a film based on Colvin's life, A Private War, directed by Matthew Heineman, written by Arash Amel, and starring Rosamund Pike as Colvin, was released, based on the 2012 article "Marie Colvin's Private War" in Vanity Fair magazine by Marie Brenner. While being interviewed in 2021, Chris Terrio, who wrote the film Batman v Superman: Dawn of Justice, stated that Lois Lane's arc in the film was inspired by Colvin.

== Awards ==
- 2000 – Journalist of the Year, Foreign Press Association
- 2000 – Courage in Journalism, International Women's Media Foundation
- 2001 – Foreign Reporter of the Year, British Press Awards
- 2009 – Foreign Reporter of the Year, British Press Awards
- 2012 – Anna Politkovskaya Award, Reach All Women in War (RAW in WAR)
- 2012 – Foreign Reporter of the Year, British Press Awards

== See also ==
- List of journalists killed during the Syrian civil war
- Serena Shim
- Girls of the Sun, a 2018 French film with the main protagonist inspired by Marie Colvin
- A Private War, a 2018 American biographical film about Marie Colvin
- Foreign Sovereign Immunities Act
- The Intercept: Review of In Extremis; photograph by Simon Townsley

Awards
Preceded by Christina Lamb	British Foreign Reporter of the Year; 2001; 2010	Succeeded by Jon Swain
Preceded by Dan McDougall	British Foreign Reporter of the Year; 2001; 2010	Succeeded by Charles Clover
