= Rémi Ochlik =

French photojournalist (1983 – 2012)

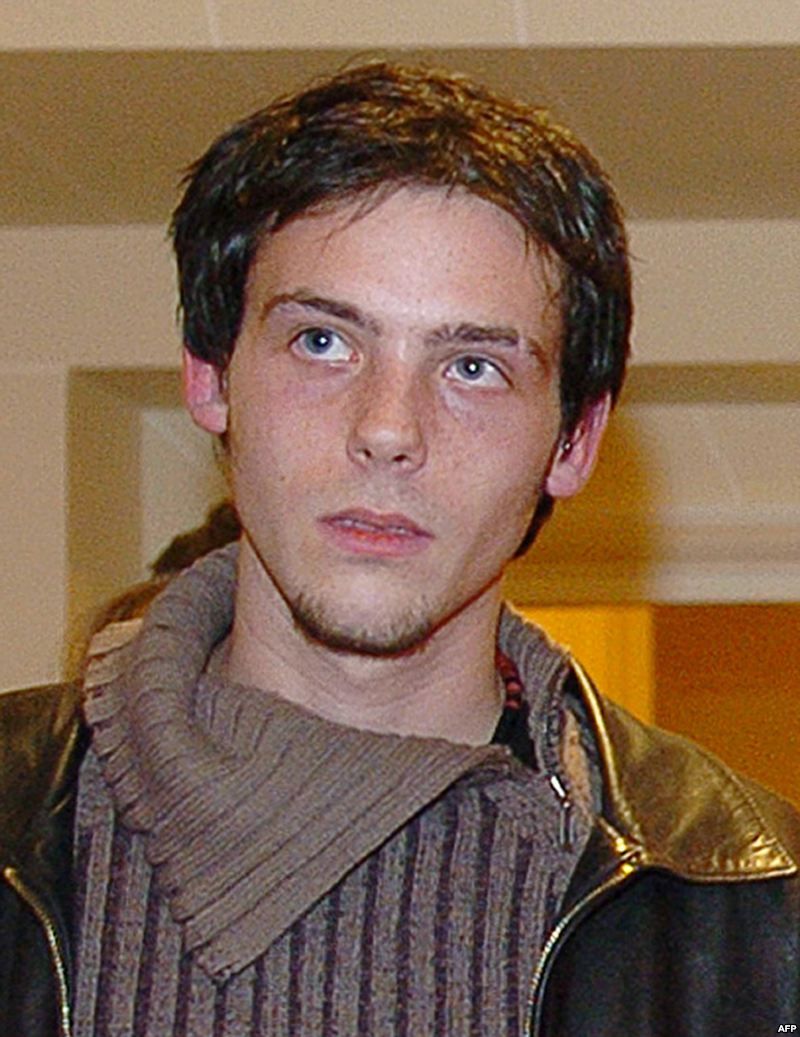
- Born: 16 October 1983; Thionville, France
- Died: 22 February 2012 (aged 28); Homs, Syria
- Cause of death: Bombardment
- Education: Marcel-Pagnol de Serémange-Erzange; Icart Photo School
- Occupation: Photojournalist
- Years active: 2002–2012
- Notable work: Haitian riots, 2004; "The Fall of Tripoli", "Egypt Tahir Square" and "The Jasmine Revolution" "Battle for Libya", 2011 (photo story)
- Partner: Emilie Blachère
- Awards: Francois Chalais Award, 2004; World Press Photo, 2012

Rémi Ochlik (16 October 1983 – 22 February 2012) was a French photojournalist who was known for his photographs of war and conflict in Haiti and the Arab Spring revolutions. Ochlik died in the February 2012 bombardment of Homs during the Syrian uprising, along with veteran war correspondent Marie Colvin. In 2025, the French government issued arrest warrants for Bashar al-Assad and other high-ranking Ba’athist Syrian officials.

== Biography ==
Rémi Ochlik was born in 1983 in Thionville and lived in the area around Florange, Moselle, in the Lorraine region of northeastern France. As a child he had ambitions of becoming an archaeologist, but after he was given an Olympus OM1 camera by his grandfather, Ochlik gravitated toward his interest in photography. After completing school at Marcel-Pagnol in Serémange-Erzange and private high school of Saint-Pierre Chanel in Thionville, Ochlik studied photography at the Icart Photo School in Paris.

== Career ==
Rémi Ochlik began working for photography agency Wostok in September 2002 where he initially began photographing demonstrations. After leaving Wostok in 2005, Ochlik founded the Parisian photographic agency, IP3 Press, and for the first time was able to get a French press card. For IP3, Ochlik covered the French presidential campaign of 2007, photographing François Bayrou, Ségolène Royal and Nicolas Sarkozy amongst others. He covered the Democratic Republic of Congo in 2008.

His photographs appeared in numerous notable magazines, such as Choc, NVD, Esquire, Time, The Wall Street Journal, Le Figaro, Le Monde, and Paris Match.

Ochlik's friends and colleagues curated his photographic work that documented the Arab Spring revolutions and posthumously published it in 2012 as Révolutions, du rêve au printemps de Rémi Ochlik.

== Notable photojournalism assignments ==
=== Haiti ===
Ochlik's breakthrough came after he documented riot scenes in Haiti in 2004 during the Presidential elections. He said about Haiti:

It was my war, I thought. When I saw what was going on in Haiti, I immediately asked myself what I was doing there. Guys with guns were taking me around on motorbikes. I could sense the danger, but it was where I always dreamt to be, in the action.

His photos were purchased by Choc magazine for 2,000 euros. His photographs of the riot scenes won the François Chalais Award for Young Reporters and were projected at the Visa pour l’Image International Photojournalism Festival. He later returned to Haiti in 2010 for IP3 to photograph the 2010–2011 Haiti cholera outbreak.

=== Arab Spring revolutions ===
Ochlik was best known for his images of the Arab Spring revolutions of 2011 and 2012, photographing Tunisia, Egypt, and Libya in 2011. In 2011, his three pictures of the Arab Spring – "The Fall of Tripoli", "Egypt Tahrir Square" and "The Jasmine Revolution" – received the Grand Prix Jean-Louis Calderon and he also won the first prize in the 2012 World Press Photo contest for his photograph of a Libyan rebel fighter. Guillaume Clavières, senior photo editor at Paris Match, said of him:

Rémi is one of the most talented young photographers of his generation. Motivated, enthusiastic, curious and brilliant. He is capable of going from one difficult news topic to another less dramatic subject with the same photographic quality. The future is his."

=== Syria ===
In 2012, Ochlik photographed scenes from the Syrian civil war. He and fellow journalist Marie Colvin were killed in the Baba Amr area of Homs during heavy shelling when a rocket struck the house they were using as their media centre. Other journalists injured during the same attack were William Daniels, Paul Conroy, and Edith Bouvier.

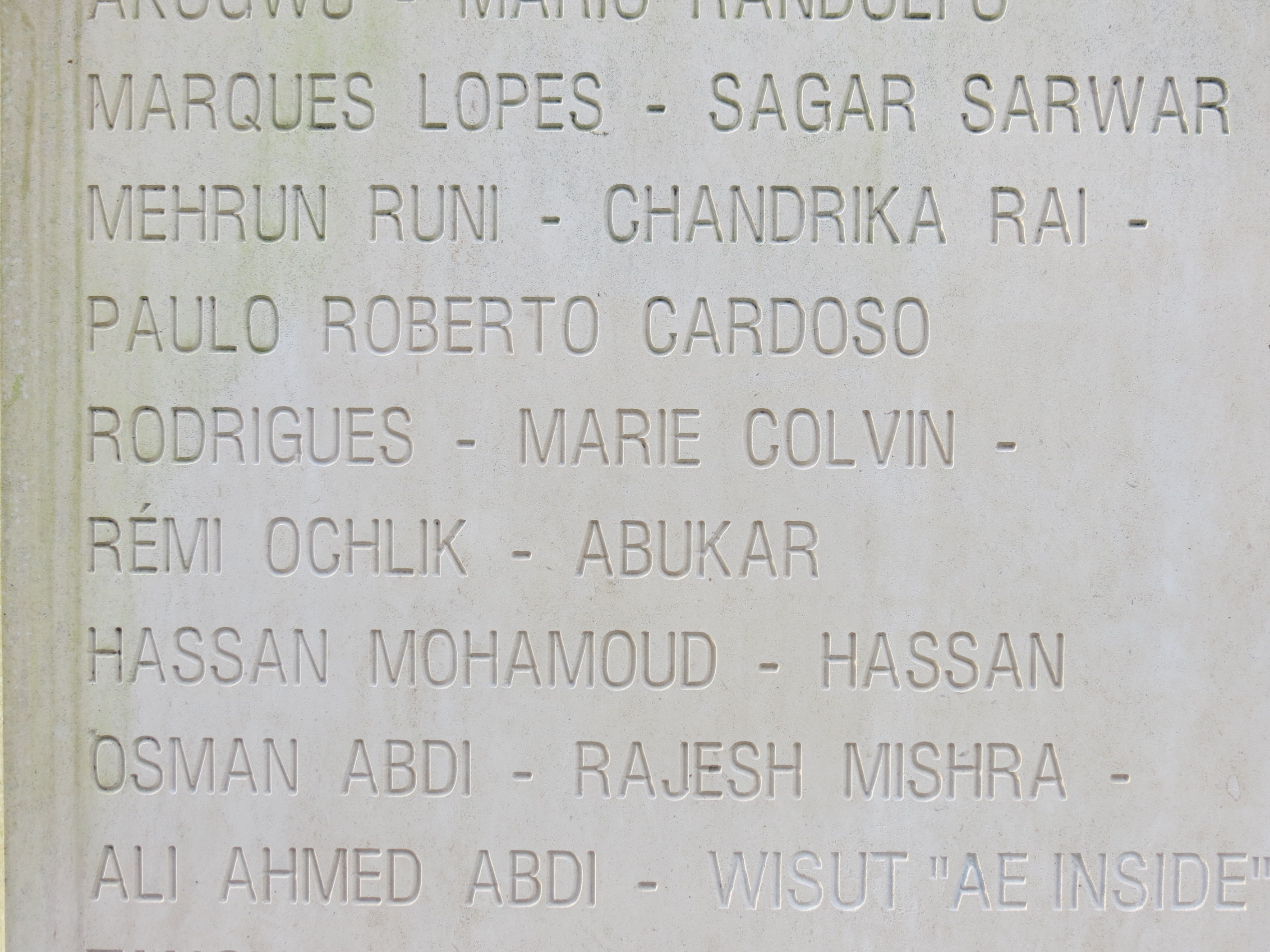
Name of Rémi Ochlik in the Mémorial des reporters, Bayeux.

Photojournalist William Daniels was able to recover photographs from Ochlik's camera that was found in the ruins of the rocket attack. Three of those images were edited for the Ochlik's posthumously published book, Revolutions. Among them were a photograph of men at a funeral and a man alone in the dark with his weapon.

== Reactions to Ochlik's work ==
Jean-François Leroy, Visa pour l'Image festival, about the photos he had seen from 2004:

Someone showed me this work on the events in Haiti. It was very beautiful, very strong. I didn't know the guy who'd done it. I asked him to come in. He's called Rémi Ochlik, he's 20. He worked all alone, like a big guy. There you go. Photojournalism is not dead.

Guillaume Clavières, senior photo editor with Paris Match, was quoted as saying, more than two months before Ochlik was killed:

Rémi is one of the most talented young photographers of his generation. Motivated, enthusiastic, curious and brilliant. He is capable of going from one difficult news topic to another less dramatic subject with the same photographic quality. The future is his.

François Hollande, who was then the Socialist party presidential candidate in France, stated:

This death touches me even more because Rémi Ochlik was accredited to [cover] my campaign and was among us a few days ago.

Sponsors of the City of Perpignan Rémi Ochlik Award on renaming the award after Ochlik:

For us, the concept of a young photographer – a talented young photographer – was synonymous with the name of Rémi Ochlik.

Karim Ben Khelifa, a friend, photojournalist and curator for Ochlik's posthumous book Revolutions, said:

Art is something that is perceived by the others. It depends on your own motivation. I would never assume that Rémi would think of himself as an artist. He was a journalist, he was a witness. Now, if people decide to look at it and find art, and find emotions and classify it this way, it belongs to the people. It doesn’t belong to him.

[Rémi Ochlik] tagged along that story [Arab Spring revolutions] and stuck to it in a very beautiful way. He was with the people. He was feeling their aspiration. He has been through you know, a tremendous experience and huge amount of danger, but he stuck to that story because he wanted to tell the story of those people ... and paid the dearest price, his life.

Stan Trecker, dean of the Art Institute of Boston at Lesley University:

His courage and intelligence resulted in compelling documentation of his experience during the Arab Spring. The photographs portray the complexities of the political and social realities for those living in the Middle East, most especially Egypt, Libya, and Syria.

Rémi Ochlik, as quoted in The Guardian (U.K.):

I expected to see horrible things. Yes, I was afraid.

== "A Love Letter from Emilie Blachère to Rémi Ochlik" (poem) ==
On the first anniversary of Rémi Ochlik's death, his partner Emilie Blachère, who is a journalist for Paris Match, read a poem she had written about her relationship with Ochlik on BBC Radio 4's popular news programme Broadcasting House. The radio host Paddy O'Connell was so moved by her poem that he could not continue to broadcast, and Radio 4 had about 12 seconds of dead air. Her poem is written as both a letter and a list about the personal qualities Blachère loved most about her partner. She includes many personal connections with Ochlik. The poem alludes to his many international assignments. Her poem includes a quotation of Ochlik's favorite movie, Singing in the Rain (1952). The published, printed poem (a variation on her reading on BBC) also references L'amour est dans le pré (the French version of Farmer Wants a Wife), Dexter, and Harry Potter. At the end of her printed poem, Blachère acknowledges another fallen journalist and a colleague and friend of Ochlik, Lucas Dolega. Dolega was the first journalist to have died in the Arab Spring revolutions in Tunisia. Blachère's poem ends: "My angel, give Lucas a kiss for me. Take care of yourself. Take care of us."

She recently participated in "A Day Without News?", a demonstration of the importance of journalists that promotes an awareness of the dangers journalists face.

== Rémi Ochlik Prize ==
Friends championed the renaming of the City of Perpignan Young Reporter Award (Le Prix du jeune reporter de la ville de Perpignan) to the Rémi Ochlik Prize (Prix Rémi Ochlik). The first presentation of the renamed Olchik Prize was at the Visa pour l’Image festival in 2012.

- 2012 : Sebastián Liste, Getty Images, a 27-year-old photographer from Uruguay who was awarded for his work Urban Quilombo, which is about the citizens of Quilombo, Brazil, whom he had photographed from 2009 to 2011.

== Awards ==
- Francois Chalais Award for Young Reporters, 2004, for his photojournalism while covering the Haitian coup d'état.
- Jean-Louis Calderon Grand prize, 2011, for "The Fall of Tripoli", "Egypt Tahir Square" and "The Jasmine Revolution".
- World Press Photo, 2012, for his General News photo story called "Battle for Libya"

== Exhibits ==
- Hommage à Rémi Ochlik ('Homage to Rémi Ochlik'), La Médiathèque de Florange, France, 2012
- Revolutions: Photographs of the Arab Spring, Art Institute of Boston at Lesley University, Boston, USA, 2013.

== See also ==
- List of journalists killed during the Syrian Civil War
- List of photojournalists
