= Fourth Extraordinary Session of the Islamic Summit Conference =

Fourth Extraordinary Session of the Islamic Summit
- 14–15 August 2012
- Host country: Saudi Arabia
- Cities: Mecca

The Fourth Extraordinary Session of the Islamic Summit was a conference organised by the Organisation of Islamic Cooperation (OIC) in Mecca on 14 and 15 August 2012. The venue of the conference was Al Safa Palace.

== Background ==
The summit was organised in response to the increased violence as a result of the Syrian civil war.

== Participants ==
Nearly all member states of the Organization of Islamic Cooperation took part in the summit. However, Syria was not invited to participate in the conference. Amongst the participants were host leader king Abdullah, Turkish president Abdullah Gul, Egyptian president Mohamed Morsi, Jordan's king Abdullah, Iranian president Mahmoud Ahmedinejad, Qatari emir Hamad bin Khalifa Al Thani, Yemeni president Abd Rabbuh Mansur Hadi, Palestine's Mahmoud Abbas, Malaysia's Najib Razak, Sudan's Omar al-Bashir, Afghanistan's Hamid Karzai, Tunisian president Moncef Marzouki, Pakistani president Asif Ali Zardari and Bangladesh's Zillur Rahman.

== Discussions ==
Discussions centred on Syria and preventing the spread of sectarian unrest that began to be experienced in the region. The king of Saudi Arabia, Abdullah, proposed the establishment of a center for dialogue in order to address the sectarian unrest in the region. It was reported that the center would be established in Riyadh. During the summit, Abdullah called for a dialogue among eight sects: the Sunni Hanafi, Maliki, Shafi'i, Hanbali and the Shia Ja'fari, Zaidi, al-Abazi and al-Zahiri, which exist in the Persian Gulf region, Saudi Arabia, United Arab Emirates, Oman, Yemen and Iraq.

== Conclusion ==
On 16 August 2012, the summit was closed with a call for more unity among Muslim countries and the need to avoid divisive tendencies. The joint decision of the summit was the suspension of Syria's membership. This move was opposed by Iran and Algeria. Both the proposal to establish a dialogue center and its planned headquarters were included in the closing statement of the summit. The closing statement also focused on the question of Palestine, stating it as the central cause of the Islamic Ummah.

=== Reactions ===
Syrian Deputy Prime Minister and Foreign and Expatriates Minister Walid Muallem stated that the decision over the suspension of Syria's membership was a clear violation of the OIC's charter. Iranian Foreign Minister Ali Akbar Salehi argued in Mecca on 16 August 2012 that the suspension was an unjust move and that Iran did not support this decision. The U.S. State Department spokeswoman Victoria Nuland commented that the decision over the suspension supports the Syrians and their struggles, and increases the international isolation of the Assad government.
