= Four committees initiative =

- Start of Syrian Revolution: 2011
- Arab League initiatives I and II: 2011–12
- Churkin peace plan: 2012
- Kofi Annan peace plan (Geneva I): 2012
- Lakhdar Brahimi peace plan: 2012
- U.S.–Russia peace proposal (2013): 2013
- Geneva II Mideast peace conference: 2014
- Staffan de Mistura peace plan: 2015
- Zabadani agreement: 2015
- Vienna talks: 2015
- Geneva III: 2016
- US-Russia ceasefire proposal (2016): 2016
- Geneva IV: 2017
- Idlib demilitarization: 2018
- Northern Syria Buffer Zone: 2019
- Second Northern Syria Buffer Zone: 2019
- Syrian Constitutional Committee: 2019
- Syrian-Turkish normalization: 2022–24
- Fall of the Assad regime: 2024
- Syrian transitional government: 2024-2025

The Four committees initiative is a proposal put forward by United Nations envoy Staffan de Mistura on 29 July 2015 as a way to start the peace process in the Syrian civil war.

The proposal suggests inviting the Syrian government to set up four themed committees addressing primary concerns of a possible ceasefire, reconstruction, political election process, the military and security. The committees are to be composed of selected people from the government and opposition. The government has agreed to the proposal but did not make promises of any binding accords as a result.

The opposition has currently completely ruled out cooperation in the initiative.
