= Kofi Annan Syrian peace plan =

Peace plan by the Arab League and the UN

- Start of Syrian Revolution: 2011
- Arab League initiatives I and II: 2011–12
- Churkin peace plan: 2012
- Kofi Annan peace plan (Geneva I): 2012
- Lakhdar Brahimi peace plan: 2012
- U.S.–Russia peace proposal (2013): 2013
- Geneva II Mideast peace conference: 2014
- Staffan de Mistura peace plan: 2015
- Zabadani agreement: 2015
- Vienna talks: 2015
- Geneva III: 2016
- US-Russia ceasefire proposal (2016): 2016
- Geneva IV: 2017
- Idlib demilitarization: 2018
- Northern Syria Buffer Zone: 2019
- Second Northern Syria Buffer Zone: 2019
- Syrian Constitutional Committee: 2019
- Syrian-Turkish normalization: 2022–24
- Fall of the Assad regime: 2024
- Syrian caretaker government: 2024–25
- Syrian Revolution Victory Conference: 2025
- Syrian National Dialogue Conference: 2025
- Syrian transitional government: 2025

The Kofi Annan peace plan for Syria or the six-point peace plan for Syria was launched in March 2012 by the Arab League and the United Nations (UN), when the violent Syrian conflict or civil war had raged for a year.

After the initiators had believed for some days end of March and beginning of April that the Syrian government was willing to comply with the peace plan, new signs of war and statements of politicians gradually cast discouraging shadows over those hopes. By the first of May 2012, the UN had to admit that the peace plan was in dire straits. Heavy government violence on 25 May, and the promise of the Free Syrian Army (FSA) on 1 June to resume its ‘defensive operations’, made clear that this peace initiative had, for the time being, run aground. Several new peace initiatives would follow, recently the attempt in 2012–2013 at a Geneva II Middle East peace conference and the Russian initiative in November 2013 for (peace) talks in Moscow.

== Chronology ==
=== UN-Arab League peace plan ===
On 23 February 2012, the evening before an international “Friends of Syria” conference organised by the Arab League in Tunisia, the United Nations and the Arab League together appointed Kofi Annan as their envoy to Syria. 70 nations were present on the conference, Russia and China not among them; Syria called those nations attending “historic enemies of the Arabs”.

On 16 March, Kofi Annan submitted a six-point peace plan to the UN Security Council (see below), asking the Syrian government “to address the legitimate aspirations and concerns of the Syrian people”, cease hostilities, pullback military concentrations from towns, while simultaneously the Envoy would seek similar commitments from the Syrian opposition and other “elements”. On 24 March 2012, Kofi Annan flew to Moscow in an effort to secure Russian support for his plan.

=== Presumed compliance of government and opposition ===
Sources like Al Jazeera and Reuters announced that Syrian president Bashar al-Assad on 27 March accepted the six-point peace plan and would be working to implement it. The New York Times and others announced that on 2 April the Syrian government promised to withdraw its security forces and heavy weaponry from major population centers and complete that withdrawal on 10 April. However, Syrian opposition activists reported heavy Syrian army shelling in the cities of Hama and Homs on 3 April. The BBC reported heavy rocket shelling in Homs on 4 April.

On 5 April 2012, Annan told the UN General Assembly that the cease-fire deadline for the Syrian government would be 6 a.m. local time on Tuesday 10 April, and for the rebels 6 a.m. on 12 April. After that UN Assembly meeting, Syrian UN ambassador Jaafari however said “a crystal-cut commitment” in writing from the U.S. France, Turkey, Qatar and Saudi Arabia to stop aiding rebel fighters was “an integral part of the understanding” between Damascus and Annan. This announcement denied Syria's presumed commitment to withdraw its forces from the cities by 10 April; both Annan and the U.S. State Department had no reaction on it.

Annan did say, 5 or 6 April, that if the cease-fire was successful, an unarmed U.N. monitoring mission (see subsection directly below) of some 200 to 250 observers could be brought into Syria. And even on 14 April, the UN Security Council meeting adopting Resolution 2042 stated that the Envoy (= mr. Annan) assessed that “as of 12 April, the parties appeared to be observing a cessation of fire”.

==== United Nations Supervision Mission ====
The United Nations Supervision Mission in Syria (UNSMIS) was the unarmed United Nations peacekeeping mission in Syria, set up in April 2012. It was commanded by Norwegian major general Robert Mood. Although observers remained in the country, Mood suspended their mission on June 16, 2012, mentioning "escalating violence." Observers would conduct no further patrols and stay in their current positions until the suspension was lifted.

=== Conceding failure ===
Hervé Ladsous, the UN Under-Secretary-General for Peacekeeping Operations, said on 1 May that both the Syrian government and the opposition were violating the cease-fire. In a bombing in Idlib on 30 April, several dozen people were killed and many more wounded in two car bomb attacks targeting Syrian military facilities in the city, only 200 meters from where some of the UN observers had been staying. By the beginning of May, over 500 people had been killed in hostilities all across Syria since the ceasefire was declared on April 12.

On 25 May 2012, in two opposition-controlled villages in the Houla region in central Syria, 49 children, 34 women and 25 men were killed in what is called the Houla massacre. The UN, after investigations, held Syrian troops and pro-government militia responsible. Following this, on 1 June, the FSA announced that it was resuming “defensive operations”. Around 2–3 June, president al-Assad in response vowed to crush an anti-government uprising. These events seemed to mark the failing of this Kofi Annan peace initiative.

== Six-point peace plan ==
The peace plan, reportedly accepted by Syrian president Bashar al-Assad on 27 March 2012, calls on the Syrian authorities to:

(1) commit to work with the Envoy in an inclusive Syrian-led political process to address the legitimate aspirations and concerns of the Syrian people, and, to this end, commit to appoint an empowered interlocutor when invited to do so by the Envoy;

(2) commit to stop the fighting and achieve urgently an effective United Nations supervised cessation of armed violence in all its forms by all parties to protect civilians and stabilise the country.

To this end, the Syrian government should immediately cease troop movements towards, and end the use of heavy weapons in, population centres, and begin pullback of military concentrations in and around population centres.

As these actions are being taken on the ground, the Syrian government should work with the Envoy to bring about a sustained cessation of armed violence in all its forms by all parties with an effective United Nations supervision mechanism.

Similar commitments would be sought by the Envoy from the opposition and all relevant elements to stop the fighting and work with him to bring about a sustained cessation of armed violence in all its forms by all parties with an effective United Nations supervision mechanism;

(3) ensure timely provision of humanitarian assistance to all areas affected by the fighting, and to this end, as immediate steps, to accept and implement a daily two hour humanitarian pause and to coordinate exact time and modalities of the daily pause through an efficient mechanism, including at local level;

(4) intensify the pace and scale of release of arbitrarily detained persons, including especially vulnerable categories of persons, and persons involved in peaceful political activities, provide without delay through appropriate channels a list of all places in which such persons are being detained, immediately begin organizing access to such locations and through appropriate channels respond promptly to all written requests for information, access or release regarding such persons;

(5) ensure freedom of movement throughout the country for journalists and a non-discriminatory visa policy for them;

(6) respect freedom of association and the right to demonstrate peacefully as legally guaranteed.

== Annan's resignation and Brahimi's succession ==
On 2 August 2012, Kofi Annan announced to step down as UN-Arab League mediator in Syria on 31 August. Annan pointed to the Syrian government's refusal to implement the six-point plan, the escalating military campaign of the Syrian opposition and the lack of unity in the UN Security Council as causes for the bloodshed to continue. Both Russia and the Syrian government said they regretted Annan's decision to quit.

On 17 August 2012, Lakhdar Brahimi was appointed as the new special envoy to Syria from the United Nations and the Arab League (see Lakhdar Brahimi peace envoy for Syria).

== See also ==
- Syrian conflict peace proposals
- International reactions to the Syrian civil war
- Robert Mood (assistant to Envoy mr. Annan, leader of negotiations)
