= International reactions to the Ghouta chemical attack =

International reactions to the Ghouta chemical attack of 21 August 2013 were widespread. The Ghouta chemical attack was a chemical weapons attack in Damascus, Syria during the Syrian Civil War. United States President Barack Obama said that the U.S. military should strike targets in Syria in retaliation for the government's purported use of chemical weapons—a proposal supported by French President François Hollande but opposed by the Syrian government's closest allies, Iran and Russia. Although the Arab League said it would support military action against Syria in the event of U.N. support, league members Iraq, Lebanon, Egypt, Tunisia and Algeria opposed intervention. On 14 September the U.S. and Russia announced an agreement on the Framework for Elimination of Syrian Chemical Weapons to destroy the Syria stockpile of chemical weapons and its production facilities, and Syria agreed to sign the Chemical Weapons Convention. The United Nations Security Council also passed Resolution 2118.

== Reactions ==
=== Supranational bodies ===
- Arab League – The Arab League released a statement on 27 August that although it held Syria responsible for chemical attacks on its citizens, it would not support military intervention.
- Union of South American Nations – South American leaders condemned violence and chemical-weapon use in Syria, demanding that the Syrian government allow investigation of opposition allegations of the use of chemical weapons in the attacks.
- United Nations – The United Kingdom called an emergency session of the United Nations Security Council on 21 August. Western nations pushed for a strongly worded resolution which would ask the UN to "urgently take the steps necessary for today's attack to be investigated by the UN mission". Due to objections from Russia and China, the statement was a carefully worded demand for "clarity" about the incident. Secretary-General Ban Ki-moon said that the report of chemical attacks "needs to be investigated without delay". When a UN onsite investigation was agreed, a senior U.S. official said: "The belated decision by the regime to grant access to the UN team is too late to be credible ... there is very little doubt at this point that a chemical weapon was used by the Syrian regime against civilians in this incident". On 26 August inspectors reached some sites (not the six main ones), but after an hour and a half they were ordered by the Syrian government to return due to safety concerns. According to Syrian Foreign Minister Walid Muallem, when investigators arrived at the affected regions "they faced gunshots and failed to continue their visit, because the armed groups have not agreed among each other on ensuring the team’s security".

=== States ===
- Albania – Outgoing Prime Minister Sali Berisha and Foreign Minister Aldo Bumçi blamed the Syrian government for the attacks, pledging their government's support for any NATO action against Syria.
- Australia – Prime Minister Kevin Rudd said that chemical weapons were apparently used "in large scale against a civilian population" and, as president of the UN Security Council, Australia would push for UN weapons inspectors to be allowed access to the sites where chemical weapons were purportedly used. According to Rudd, although "the burden of proof lies with the Syrian regime" he expressed caution about international action in light of Australian involvement in the Iraq War in the belief that the Iraqi government was stockpiling weapons of mass destruction. After speaking with President Obama on 27 August, the prime minister said that the international community had a responsibility to act and compared the crisis in Syria to the Rwandan genocide and the Srebrenica massacre.
- Austria – In a statement issued by the Ministry of Foreign Affairs, Foreign Minister Michael Spindelegger called reports of Syrian Army chemical-weapons use "extremely worrying" and said that CW use would constitute a "glaring crime of the Assad regime". Spindelegger called for a UN investigation of the reports.
- Brazil – Minister of Foreign Affairs Antonio Patriota called for an independent investigation into allegations of chemical-weapons use, suggesting that international action should wait until the attacks were confirmed.
- Canada – On 27 August, Prime Minister Stephen Harper agreed by telephone with President Obama on a "firm response" to the Syrian government. Foreign Minister John Baird issued a statement demanding that the Syrian government allow UN weapons inspectors to examine the sites. At the 5–6 September G-20 Saint Petersburg summit, Harper said that a military strike against Syria was necessary; on 7 September he urged the international community to take military action against Syria, citing the use of chemical weapons as a dangerous precedent.
- Chile – The Ministry of Foreign Affairs condemned the attacks, demanding that the Syrian government provide UN weapons inspectors access to the areas of reported chemical attacks.
- China – Foreign Ministry spokesperson Hong Lei said that China is firmly opposed to the use of chemical weapons by any party in Syria, affirming that it supports the UN Secretariat in conducting an independent, objective, impartial and professional investigation on the alleged use of chemical weapons in accordance with UN resolutions. According to Lei, China believes that the team would have the full cooperation of the Syrian government to ensure a smooth investigation. His country called on all sides to work together to hold the second Geneva Conference on Syria as soon as possible and launch an inclusive political transition.
- Colombia – In a Ministry of Foreign Affairs press release, the Colombian government expressed its "profound concern due to the recent situations in the Arab Republic of Syria, energetically condemns the killings of innocent civilians, and makes a call to establish a political dialogue to end the violence and the abuse of human rights". Colombian domestic media noted that the government does not support military intervention in Syria, instead expressing its support for United Nations efforts to negotiate an end to the conflict. Colombia expressed "its most vehement rejection towards the use of chemical weapons, regardless of who used them. Its use constitutes to war crimes, therefore we must assume as an international community the responsibility that this crimes do not go unpunished; we reiterate that there are international courts that must take suit in this role". It recognizes "the Mission of Verification of the United Nations, and urges the Security Council to take action according to the results of the mission in order to maintain peace and international security".
- Ecuador – An unidentified government agency rejected the manipulation of information on the use of chemical weapons to justify military action, supporting the authorization of the UN investigation team to sanction the perpetrators of the reported attack.
- Egypt – The Egyptian government opposed military intervention in Syria. Interim President Adly Mansour told a US Congressional delegation that Egypt does not support a US-led military attack on Syria, denouncing US insistence on acting "without the approval of the UN Security Council and without commitment to international legitimacy". Foreign Minister Nabil Fahmy said that Egypt condemned the use of chemical weapons, regardless of who uses them, adding that Egypt rejects foreign military intervention in Syria and political dialogue was the only way out of the crisis. "Egypt rejects military intervention in Syria, as we believe a political solution is the only way out for the crisis there. Egypt supports the Geneva Two talks", Fahmy said at a Ministry of Foreign Affairs press conference in Cairo.
- France – France's Foreign Ministry said that although it did not have independent confirmation that an attack took place (as claimed by the opposition), those responsible "will be held accountable". It called for an investigation of the use of chemical weapons in the attacks. France said that the international community should respond to the incident "with force", saying on 25 August it had "no doubt" that Damascus was behind the chemical attacks. President François Hollande said on 27 August, "France is ready to punish those who took the heinous decision to gas innocents".
- Germany – Foreign Minister Guido Westerwelle said, "Germany will be among those [countries] that consider it right for there to be consequences". An unidentified government agency condemned the attacks, saying that they "must be punished" if verified.
- Holy See – Pope Francis noted the "terrible images" from Syria, calling on the international community "to be more sensitive to this tragic situation and make every effort to help the beloved Syrian nation find a solution" to the civil war. UN ambassador Silvano Tomasi urged caution: "What immediate interest would the government in Damascus have in causing such a tragedy? ... Who does this inhuman crime really benefit?"
- India – India is waiting for a UN investigation to assess the origin of the attack, describing it as a "grave concern. We stress that the international legal norm against the use of chemical weapons anywhere and by anyone must not be breached".
- Indonesia – Foreign Minister Marty Natalegawa said that the international community "must make sure that perpetrators of such inhumane acts are punished accordingly. If [Syria’s regime] has actually used chemical weapons, it marks the lowest point in the conflict".
- Iran – President Hassan Rouhani condemned the attack without accusing either the government or the opposition of perpetrating it, saying on his Twitter feed: "Iran gives notice to international community to use all its might to prevent use of chemical weapons anywhere in the world, [especially] in Syria". Foreign Minister Mohammad Javad Zarif said that the Syrian government assured Iran that it did not use "such inhumane weapons", and he blamed the attack on the opposition: "The international community must show a serious reaction to the use of chemical weapons by the terrorists in Syria and condemn this move". According to Abbas Araqchi of the Iranian Foreign Ministry, Russia submitted proof to the UN Security Council that chemical weapons were used by the opposition and not by the government. On 1 September, former Iranian president Akbar Rafsanjani said that the Syrian government used chemical weapons on its own people.
- Iraq – In the wake of the attacks, an unidentified government agency called for continued UN investigation and opposed further militarization of the conflict.
- Ireland – The Department of Foreign Affairs and Trade said that Ireland's position on Syria was unchanged, reiterating the Minister for Foreign Affairs and Trade Éamon Gilmore's March 2013 statement that "further militarization of the crisis must be avoided and a political solution found instead." Opposition parties Fianna Fáil and Sinn Féin also opposed military action.
- Israel – According to Minister of Defense Moshe Ya'alon, the Syrian government has lost control of Syria and is a presence in only forty percent of the country. Describing the civil war as a life-and-death struggle between Alawites and Sunnis, Ya'alon said that there was no end in sight. Minister of Strategic Affairs Yuval Steinitz said Israeli intelligence assessments indicated that "chemical weapons were used, and they were not used for the first time", adding that "nothing practical, significant, has been done in the last two years in order to stop the continuing massacre of civilians carried out by the Assad regime. I think that the investigation of the United Nations is a joke".
- Italy – Although Foreign Minister Emma Bonino called the attack a "war crime", Italy would not participate in international action without authorization from the United Nations Security Council.
- Japan – According to Japanese sources, Prime Minister Shinzo Abe discussed the conflict in Syria with President Obama at the G-20 summit in St. Petersburg on 5 September and said he understands Obama's desire to strike Syria. Abe agreed with Obama that Assad was behind the attacks.
- Jordan – Prime Minister Abdullah Ensour reiterated that Jordan would not be used to launch a preemptive strike against the Syrian government. Ensour said that the 900 US troops in Jordan are not part of a plan to wage war on Syria, and his government opposes foreign intervention in Syria.
- Lebanon – Foreign Minister Adnan Mansour said that he did not support the idea of strikes on Syria in response to the chemical attacks: "I don't think this action would serve peace, stability and security in the region."
- Malaysia – Foreign Minister Anifah Aman said that if the attacks took place, the government condemns them: "Malaysia calls upon those responsible for such irresponsible and inhuman acts to be brought to justice", and chemical-weapons inspectors should be allowed to inspect the sites.
- New Zealand – Prime Minister John Key called the attacks horrific and urged the UN Security Council to work to resolve the crisis, although the United States and other countries may act outside the UN mandate due to Security Council opposition from Russia. Key did not specify what role, if any, New Zealand might play in international action unsanctioned by the UN.
- Pakistan – Pakistan strongly urged the United States and the European Union to avoid military force in Syria. Foreign Office spokesperson Aizaz Chaudhry said that Syrian sovereignty and territorial integrity must be respected, expressing deep concern about the ongoing violence and the threat of American military action in already-embattled Syria. Chaudhry also strongly condemned the alleged use of chemical weapons by the Syrian government: "All the engaged parties should adopt [a] course of dialogue instead of violence and peaceful resolution of the conflict should be sought out". National Security Adviser Sartaj Aziz, who briefed Parliament on the issue, said that although Pakistan condemns the use of chemical weapons, it does not support proposed U.S. aerial strikes which would make the situation "more concerning". Before Parliament, Aziz told the U.S. and the UK: "We should wait for the UN mission’s report on Syria."
- Palau - In a letter to President Obama, Palauan President Tommy Remengesau expressed Palau's full support for a U.S. strike on Syria and accused the Syrian government of crimes against humanity.
- Qatar – Foreign Minister Khalid bin Mohammad Al Attiyah said that he holds the UN Security Council "solely responsible for what happened" and blamed the Syrian government for using "internationally prohibited weaponry" in the attack, which "crossed all lines and violated all rights".
- Russia – Foreign Ministry spokesman Alexander Lukashevich called the attack a "provocation planned in advance. The fact that agenda-driven regional mass media have begun an aggressive attack at once, as if on command, laying all the responsibility on the government, draws attention. The fact that the criminal action near Damascus was carried out just when the mission of UN experts to investigate the statements on possible chemical weapons use there has successfully begun its work in Syria points to this".
- South Korea – The Foreign Ministry said, "Our government strongly condemns such brutal acts of crime", denouncing the Syrian government for its alleged use of chemical weapons. South Korea called on the United States to act strongly against the Assad regime, fearing that failing to respond to chemical-weapons use would send the wrong message to North Korea.
- Sweden – Foreign Minister Carl Bildt wrote on his blog that the attack was poison gas and a UN team must investigate immediately: "Trying to evaluate the information available, I find it difficult to come to any other conclusion than that a lethal chemical substance has been used in the attack against opposition-controlled territory that was carried out by regime forces during the night between Tuesday and Wednesday." Bildt added that he believes that Syrian president Bashar al-Assad helped coordinate the attacks.
- Turkey – President Abdullah Gül said, "Those who have perpetrated these massacres will be remembered with curse forever. Moreover, they will have to pay for their deeds before international law". The Ministry of Foreign Affairs released a statement that such an attack "can only be defined as barbarism and atrocity. The people who are responsible for this atrocity are the administrators of the regime and a ravenous group aiming at preserving their power at all costs. These people killing their own people and destroying Syria will answer for their deeds sooner or later. In the face of this massacre, which violates the international law and constitutes a serious crime against humanity. Turkey calls on the UN Security Council to fulfill now its responsibilities stemming from the United Nations Charter".
- Ukraine – Minister of Foreign Affairs Leonid Kozhara said that chemical weapons were "probably" used. Kyiv seeks a resolution to the Syrian conflict by "political-legal, international and diplomatic means", and Kozhara suggested that the UN Security Council is the appropriate arbiter of the conflict under international law.
- United Kingdom – Foreign Secretary William Hague called on the Syrian government to allow the UN team to investigate the attacks: "I am deeply concerned by reports that hundreds of people, including children, have been killed in airstrikes and a chemical weapons attack on rebel-held areas near Damascus. These reports are uncorroborated and we are urgently seeking more information. But it is clear that if they are verified, it would mark a shocking escalation in the use of chemical weapons in Syria". Hague added that he believes the Syrian government carried out the attacks, later saying that diplomatic pressure on Syria had failed and the UK, "the United States, [and] many other countries including France, are clear that we can't allow the idea in the 21st century that chemical weapons can be used with impunity". A 29 August 2013 parliamentary motion that military strikes in response to chemical-weapons attacks would be legal if the strikes constituted humanitarian intervention was proposed, which failed to pass in the House of Commons by a 285–272 vote the following day. By 3 September, newspapers were reporting that Prime Minister David Cameron was under increasing pressure to allow a revote after the publication of compelling evidence of Syria's culpability. Cameron said that the UK would focus on humanitarian aid to refugees in Syria and neighboring states, and encouraged other G20 countries to increase their relief efforts.

US Secretary of State John Kerry's remarks on the Ghouta chemical attacks, 26 August 2013

- United States – President Obama called the attack a "big event of grave concern." Secretary of State John Kerry said on 26 August that it was "undeniable" that an "inexcusable" chemical attack occurred, suggesting that the Obama administration believed the Syrian government was behind it. Kerry strongly condemned the attacks as a "moral obscenity" and said "that this international norm cannot be violated without consequences". UN Ambassador Samantha Power wrote on Twitter, "Assad has used [chemical weapons] against civilians in violation of [international] norm." The U.S. said it was "deeply concerned by reports that chemical weapons were used", and officials were "working urgently to gather additional information. The United States strongly condemns any and all use of chemical weapons. Those responsible for the use of chemical weapons must be held accountable. Today, we are formally requesting that the United Nations urgently investigate this new allegation". On 22 August the U.S. said it was unable to say conclusively that chemical weapons were used in the attack, and Obama urgently directed U.S. intelligence agencies to help verify the allegations. On 27 August, U.S. and Israeli officials said they intercepted communications from Syrian officials indicating that the government was responsible for the attack.
- Uruguay – The Ministry of Foreign Affairs issued a statement calling the attacks "an act of barbarism", reiterating its condemnation of the violence in Syria "by the conflicting parties."
- Vietnam – Vietnam is deeply concerned over the use of chemical weapons in Syria and strongly opposes to the action targeting civilians, said Foreign Ministry spokesman Luong Thanh Nghi: "We strongly emphasize the necessity to abide by the International Chemical Weapons Convention and call upon related sides to exercise self-restraint and resolve the problem in a subjective and cautious manner, via peaceful solutions and in respect for international laws and the United Nations Charter".

== Military options ==
On 23 August, U.S. and European security sources made a preliminary assessment that chemical weapons were used by Syrian forces, probably with high-level approval from the Assad government. The sources cautioned that the assessment was preliminary and they were still seeking conclusive proof, which could take days, weeks, or longer to gather. On 23 August, U.S. officials said that their intelligence detected activity at Syrian chemical-weapons sites before the attack. Citing unidentified sources, Foreign Policy's online Cable channel reported that "U.S. intelligence services" intercepted communications between an official at the Syrian Ministry of Defense and the leader of a chemical-weapons unit, demanding an explanation for a nerve-agent strike hours after the attack. According to the report, American officials believed that the attacks were the work of Assad's regime based on the content of the calls (although they were uncertain who ordered the attacks).

Russian President Vladimir Putin told British Prime Minister David Cameron that there was no evidence that the chemical weapons were used by the Syrian government. An Iranian Foreign Ministry official said that Russia submitted evidence to the UN Security Council (including satellite images) allegedly proving that chemical weapons were used by the opposition and not the government.

The government of the United Kingdom proposed military action, which was put to a vote in the House of Commons. On 30 August, the House of Commons voted against military action by a 285–272 margin, citing concerns about its justification. Although the prime minister does not need parliamentary approval for military action, Cameron said that he would abide by the will of Parliament.

The United States reportedly planned to launch up to 100 Tomahawk cruise missiles against the Syrian Army, but after several days of public indecision about how to respond to the attacks, President Obama said on 31 August that he would seek congressional authorization before approving military action (although he thought punitive strikes were warranted). No vote in Congress was held, but the United States Senate Committee on Foreign Relations did approve the Authorization for the Use of Military Force Against the Government of Syria to Respond to Use of Chemical Weapons (S.J.Res 21) on 4 September, which would allow the president to take direct action for up to 90 days, but specifically forbid "boots on the ground". An early 2012 U.S. Department of Defense memorandum estimated that "more than 75,000 ground troops" would be needed for the U.S. to gain control of chemical-weapons factories in Syria.

Under President François Hollande, France also considered military action, and the government of Turkey called for a more-robust effort to not only punish the Syrian government for the chemical attacks but to remove Assad from power.

Iran warned that strikes would be met with retaliation against Israel. French or U.S. action would reportedly be launched without approval from the UN Security Council, with Russian officials saying that international military action without UN authorization would violate international law. China also warned against military intervention in Syria, saying that it would have "catastrophic consequences" for the region.

Former UN inspector Hans Blix wrote in the Swedish newspaper, Aftonbladet, that no one was going to act militarily and the UN sanctions were toothless. Swedish Defense Research Agency Middle East expert Magnus Norell said, "Taking things through the UN Security Council is just an excuse to not do something, because you know that a veto will be passed ... It's clear that Assad doesn't care about the UN".

=== Public opinion ===
Public-opinion polls have consistently shown that most Americans do not support military intervention in Syria. A Huffington Post poll found that U.S. public support for military strikes in Syria increased from 19 to 25 percent after the attacks in Ghouta. An ABC News poll found that 50 percent of Americans oppose intervention, while 50 percent support it if it is described as cruise missiles launched from a naval vessel. A Pew poll found that Americans opposed military intervention by a 48-to-29-percent margin. An NBC poll found the margin to be eight percent. A Reuters-Ipsos poll found that 56 percent opposed intervention and 19 percent supported it, A Washington Post-ABC poll found that 59 percent of Americans opposed military action in Syria. A Rasmussen poll found that 37 percent of Americans supported "increased military assistance to protect the citizens of Syria", and 40 percent "do not think the United States should get more involved militarily". Most Americans do not know where Syria is, and only a slim majority of those polled at the Department of Defense know where the country is.

Polls have found that most British and French people oppose strikes without UN approval, and a parliamentary motion supporting military intervention failed in the British House of Commons on 31 August (making David Cameron the first British prime minister in over 150 years to be prevented from going to war by Parliament). UK government policy subsequently focused on providing humanitarian assistance in Syria and to refugees in neighboring countries.

=== Legal status ===
United Nations Secretary General Ban Ki-Moon said, "The use of force is lawful only when in exercise of self-defense, or when the Security Council approves such action". According to Lakhdar Brahimi (UN and Arab League Special Envoy to Syria since August 2012), "I think international law is clear on this. International law says that military action must be taken after a decision by the Security Council ... certainly international law is very clear – the Security Council has to be brought in."

The UK government published its legal position on the legality of military action. It stated it was seeking a resolution from the United Nations Security Council that would, among other things, authorize member states to take measures (which could include military action) to protect civilians in Syria from the use of chemical weapons and prevent the future use of Syria's stockpile of chemical weapons. If a Security Council resolution was blocked, the UK stated it would still be permitted under international law to take military action on humanitarian grounds if certain conditions are met, and that all three conditions were clearly met in this case.

Members of the United States Congress, including Lynn Jenkins, said that President Obama required "consent from Congress as prescribed in the Constitution and the War Powers Resolution of 1973" to carry out military strikes in Syria. Obama announced on 31 August that he would seek congressional approval for military strikes: "While I believe I have the authority to carry out this military action without specific congressional authorization, I know the country will be stronger if we take this course, and our actions will be even more effective. We should have this debate". Congress was on recess at the time of the announcement, and was scheduled to return on 9 September. In connection with an alleged Israeli strike in April 2013 on a Syrian chemical-weapons site, US Ambassador to Israel Michael Oren said that removing chemical weapons by military force was potentially difficult: " ... under international law, if you strike a chemical weapons base and there is collateral damage to civilians it is as if you, the attacker, used chemical weapons."

=== Regional deployments ===
The United States Navy deployed ships to the eastern Mediterranean and the Red Sea in the days after the attacks. Five Arleigh Burke-class destroyers were initially deployed to the eastern Mediterranean: USS Barry, Stout, Ramage, Mahan and Gravely. The USS Harry S. Truman carrier strike group including the Ticonderoga-class cruisers Gettysburg and San Jacinto and the Arleigh Burke-class destroyers Bulkeley and Mason transited the Suez Canal on 18 August on their way to the Indian Ocean, where they relieved the USS Nimitz carrier strike group (which moved into the Red Sea on 1 September, placing it within easy deployment range of the eastern Mediterranean). The other ships in the Nimitz carrier strike group were the Ticonderoga-class cruiser Princeton and the three Arleigh Burke-class destroyers Shoup, Stockdale and William P. Lawrence.

On 29 August the French Navy Horizon-class frigate Chevalier Paul left its home port of Toulon for the eastern Mediterranean. The United Kingdom deployed a Royal Navy Trafalgar-class submarine equipped with Tomahawk cruise missiles to the Mediterranean. On 29 August, the Royal Air Force deployed six Typhoon fighter jets from RAF Coningsby to RAF Akrotiri on Cyprus as a precautionary measure. The Typhoon deployment followed the arrival of two Tristar air-to-air refuelling aircraft and one E3D Sentry airborne early warning and control aircraft at Akrotiri two days earlier. The Royal Navy Type 23 frigate HMS Westminster, part of a larger Royal Navy battle group, was deployed to the Mediterranean for the annual Cougar 13 exercise. The other ships in the battle group were the helicopter carrier Illustrious, the amphibious transport dock ship Bulwark, the frigate Montrose and six Royal Fleet Auxiliary ships: RFA Lyme Bay, Mounts Bay, Cardigan Bay, Fort Austin, Fort Victoria and Diligence. Bulwark and the three Bay-class landing ships carried elements of the Royal Marines 3 Commando Brigade.

On 30 August the amphibious transport dock USS San Antonio arrived in the eastern Mediterranean to join the five destroyers there, carrying elements of the 26th Marine Expeditionary Unit. The Wasp-class amphibious assault ship USS Kearsarge moved to the Red Sea with more of the 26th Marine Expeditionary Unit. On 3 September, Mahan left the eastern Mediterranean to return to its home port of Norfolk. On 4 September the Italian Navy Orizzonte-class frigate Andrea Doria and the Maestrale-class frigate Maestrale left their home port of Taranto for the eastern Mediterranean, and the Italian Navy Durand de la Penne-class destroyer Francesco Mimbelli and the Sauro-class submarine Salvatore Pelosi were deployed to the Ionian Sea.

Russia maintains a naval facility in Tartus. On 5 September several vessels were on their way to the Mediterranean, including the amphibious warfare ships Minsk, Novocherkassk and Nikolai Filchenkov; the reconnaissance ship Prirazovye; the Slava-class cruiser Moskva, and the Udaloy-class destroyer Admiral Panteleyev. The Kashin-class destroyer Smetlivy, the Nanuchka-class corvette Shtil and Tarantul-class corvette Ivanovets were scheduled to arrive by the end of September.

== UN chemical-weapons plan ==
After a U.S. suggestion that a handover of Syrian chemical weapons within a week might avert military action, Russia and Syria began to pursue this solution. On 10 September Syria said it would be willing to sign the Chemical Weapons Convention, halt weapons production and allow UN inspectors access to its stockpiles; joining the convention would be an implicit commitment to the destruction of its chemical-weapons stockpile. Debate began at the UN over the terms of a resolution on the issue. With no clear support in Congress for military action, and the UK Parliament having already voted against military action, the U.S. put its attempt to gain Congressional authorization for military strikes on hold, stressing that the UN initiative must not be merely a delaying tactic, and said it would wait for a report from UN inspectors.

In Foreign Policy, Yochi Dreazen wrote that implementing such a plan would not be easy: "Taking control of Assad's enormous stores of the munitions would be difficult to do in the midst of a brutal civil war. Dozens of new facilities for destroying the weapons would have to be built from scratch or brought into the country from the U.S., and completing the job would potentially take a decade or more". The plan's success would depend on Syrian disclosure of its full stockpile—much of which is mobile, and spread across dozens of sites—and it would be difficult (particularly in civil-war conditions) to verify that this was done.

Syrian rebels opposed the plan, saying that the Syrian government could escape punishment for its crimes. According to Selim Idris the rebels would work with the inspectors, but Qassim Saadeddine said: "Let the Kerry-Lavrov plan go to hell. We reject it and we will not protect the inspectors or let them enter Syria." Idris said that the government had begun moving its chemical weapons to Lebanon and Iraq.

== Peace proposals ==
A pre-Geneva II preparation meeting planned by senior U.S. and Russian diplomats for 28 August 2013 in The Hague was postponed by the U.S. Department of State because of "ongoing consultations" about the attacks. According to a State Department spokesperson, the U.S. "would work with Russia to reschedule [the] planned meeting and that the alleged chemical weapons attack demonstrated the need for a 'comprehensive and durable political solution'." On 6 September, President Obama said that he and Russian President Putin agreed that the "underlying conflict" in Syria could "only be resolved through a political transition as envisioned by the Geneva I and Geneva II process".

== See also ==
- 2017 Shayrat missile strike
- 2018 bombing of Damascus and Homs
