= Arab League peace plan =

The term Arab League peace plan may be one of the following terms:

- Arab Peace Initiative in the Israeli-Palestinian conflict (2002 and 2007)
- Arab League peace plans for Syria (2011–2012)
