= Geneva Summit =

Geneva Summit may refer to

- Geneva Summit (1955), a meeting of President Dwight D. Eisenhower of the United States, Prime Minister Anthony Eden of Britain, Premier Nikolai A. Bulganin of the Soviet Union, and Prime Minister Edgar Faure of France
- Geneva Summit (1985), a meeting between US president Ronald Reagan and Soviet general secretary Mikhail Gorbachev
- The 2021 Russia–United States summit, a meeting between US President Joe Biden and Russian President Vladimir Putin
- Geneva Summit for Human Rights and Democracy

== See also ==
- Geneva Conference (disambiguation)
- Geneva Conventions
