= Geneva Conference =

Geneva Conference may refer to:

- Geneva peace talks on Syria (2017)
- Geneva peace talks on Syria (2016)
- Geneva II Conference on Syria (2014)
- Geneva I Conference on Syria (2012)
- Agreed Framework (1994, Geneva), between North Korea and the U.S.
- Geneva Peace Conference (1991), on Iraq and Kuwait
- The first world climate conference in 1979 establishing e.g. the IPCC
- Geneva Conference (1976), on Rhodesia
- Geneva Conference (1973), on the Arab–Israeli conflict
- International Conference on the Peaceful Uses of Atomic Energy (1955, Geneva, which led to the IAEA becoming established)
- 1954 Geneva Conference, on Indochina (Vietnam, Laos, and Cambodia)
- Conference for the Reduction and Limitation of Armaments, a.k.a. Geneva Disarmament Conference (1932–1934)
- Geneva Conference (1932), a continuation of the 1927 naval conference
- World Population Conference (29 August–3 September 1927), on demography
- Geneva Naval Conference (20 June–4 August 1927), on naval arms limitation
- Geneva World Economic Conference (1927) (4–23 May 1927), on international finance and trade

== See also ==
- Geneva Accord (2003), on the Israeli–Palestinian conflict
- Gen Con, originally the Lake Geneva Wargames Convention
- Geneva Conventions, for the humanitarian treatment of war (1864, 1906, 1929, 1949)
- Geneva Declaration (1918), an abandoned agreement on creation of Yugoslavia
- Geneva interim agreement on the Iranian nuclear program (2013)
- Geneva Statement on Ukraine, an agreement to de-escalate the 2014 pro-Russian unrest in Ukraine
- Geneva Summit (1955), on Cold War-era world peace
- Geneva Agreement (1966), on Guyana–Venezuela territorial dispute
- Geneva Summit (1985), on international relations and the arms race
- International Conference on the Settlement of the Laotian Question (1962)
