= Russian involvement in the Syrian civil war =

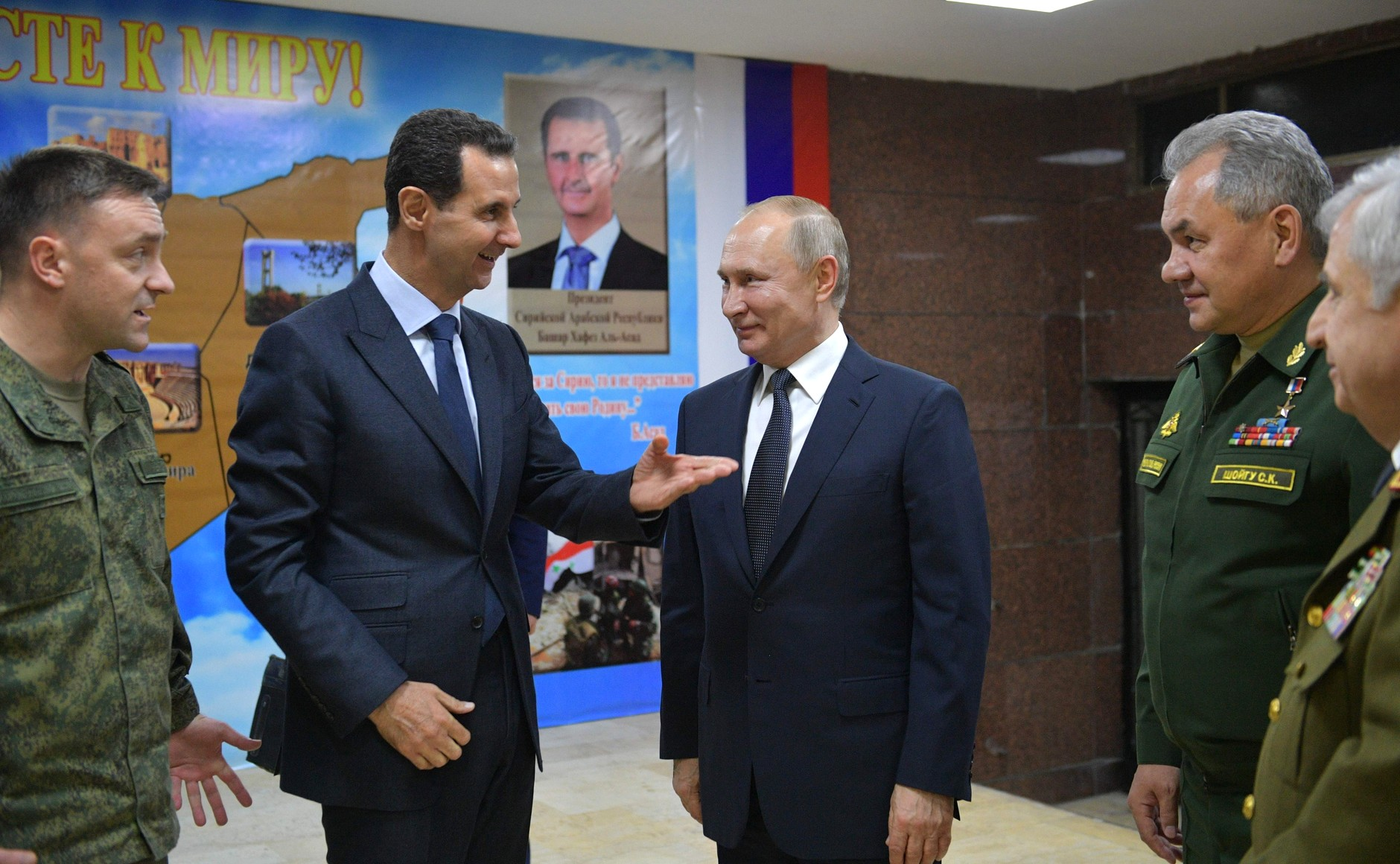
President Bashar al-Assad meets with President Vladimir Putin and Defence Minister Sergei Shoigu in Damascus, 7 January 2020

Russia supported the Ba'athist administration of former president Bashar al-Assad of Syria from the onset of the Syrian civil war in 2011: politically, with military aid, and (from September 2015 to December 2024) with direct military involvement. The 2015 deployment to Syria marked the first time since the end of the Cold War in 1991 that Russia entered an armed conflict outside the borders of the former Soviet Union.

From October 2011, Russia, as a permanent member of the UN Security Council, repeatedly vetoed Western-sponsored draft resolutions in the UN Security Council that demanded the resignation of Syrian president Bashar al-Assad and would thereby open the possibility of United Nations sanctions against his government. The Russian leadership rejects the demands of Western powers and their Arab allies that Bashar al-Assad should not be allowed to be a participant in the Syria settlement. In January and February 2012, the opposition Syrian National Council and the Western powers dismissed Russian peace initiatives.

In September 2015, the Federation Council, (the upper house of Russia's parliament) authorized the Russian president to use armed forces in Syria. Russian air and missile strikes began targeting the Islamic State of Iraq and the Levant (ISIL), the Army of Conquest, al-Nusra Front, and the Free Syrian Army. Russia has also provided armament and air support to Turkey. Russian military delivered 5 tons of ammunition and weapons to the People's Defense Units (part of the Syrian Democratic Forces) in Sheikh Maqsoud in their operations against ISIL in Syria.

During the course of the Russian intervention, Russia moved beyond bombing just military targets and began bombing hospitals and medical facilities. According to Airwars, between four and six thousand civilians were killed by Russian military actions. Due to this, Russia's seat at the UN Human Rights Council was taken away in October 2016. A report by Airwars found a 34% increase in incidents of civilian harm caused by Russia during the first six months of 2018 compared to 2017.

== Background ==
=== History of ties between Syria and Russia ===
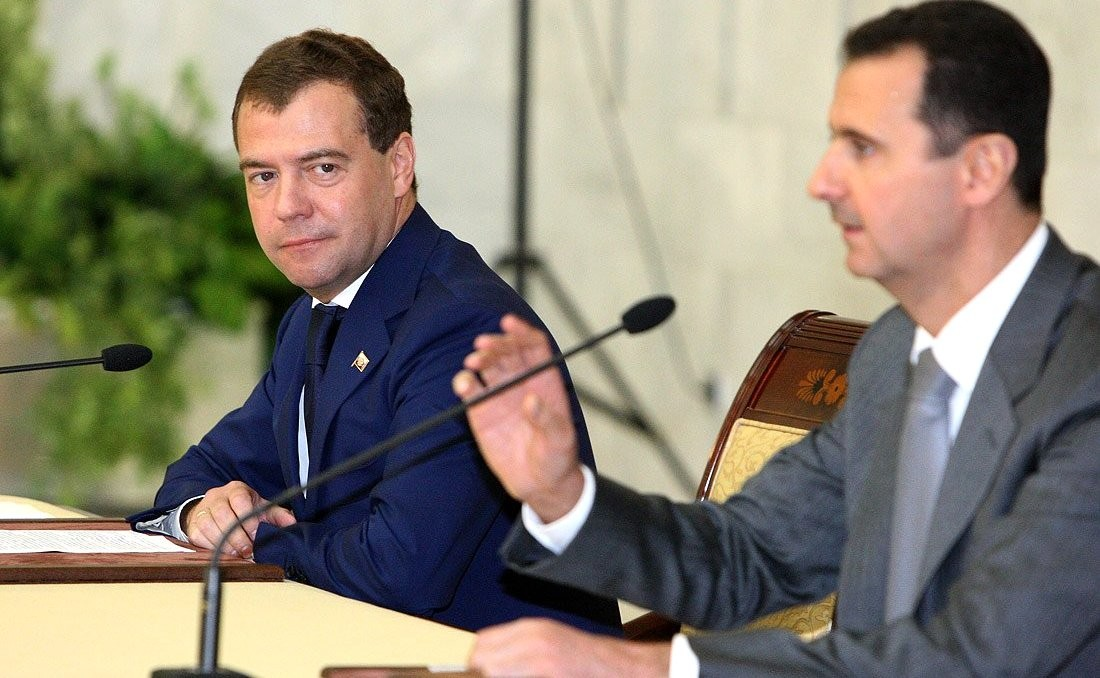
Dmitry Medvedev in a joint press conference with the Syrian President following Russo-Syrian talks in May 2010

During the Cold War (1947–1991), Syria was an ally to the Soviet Union in opposition to the Western powers, and a strong political bond grew. Between 1955 and 1958, Syria received about $294 million from the Soviet Union for military and economic assistance. The Suez War in 1956 accelerated a multiplication of ties between Syria and the Soviet Union, simultaneously with the increase in power and influence of the Syrian Ba'ath Party.

The Syrian Revolution of February 1966 gave the Soviet Union the opportunity to further support Syria. In 1971, under an agreement with the Syrian Ba'athist government's President Hafez al-Assad, the Soviet Union was allowed to open its naval military base in Tartus, giving the Soviet Union a stable presence in the Middle East. Thousands of Syrian military officers and educated professionals studied in Russia during President Hafez al-Assad's three-decade rule (1971–2000).

In April 1977, Hafez al-Assad visited Moscow, and met with Soviet leaders Leonid Brezhnev and Alexei Kosygin among others, as a sign of improved Syrian relations with the USSR. Three years later, in October 1980, Syria and the Soviet Union signed a twenty-year Treaty of Friendship and Cooperation.

At the beginning of the Syrian civil war (2011), Syria was one of Russia's closest Middle Eastern allies.

=== Syrian civil war ===
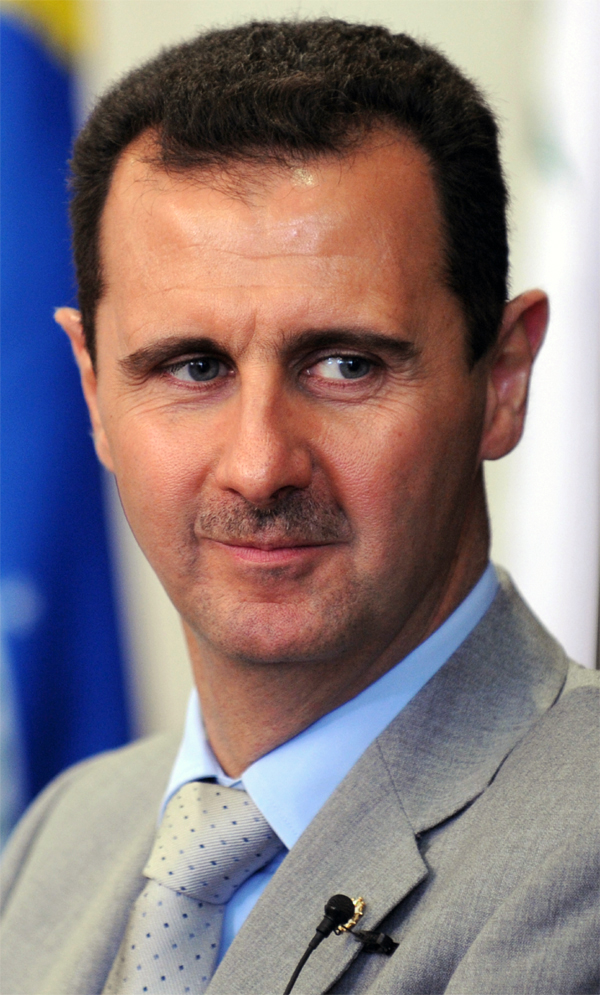
Bashar al-Assad, Syrian President from 2000 to 2024

The Syrian Civil War is an ongoing international armed conflict taking place in Syria. The unrest began in the early spring of 2011 within the context of Arab Spring protests, with nationwide protests against President Bashar al-Assad's government, whose forces responded with violent crackdowns. The civil uprising phase created the platform for the emergence of militant opposition movements and massive defections from the Syrian Army, which gradually transformed the conflict from a civil uprising to an armed rebellion, and later civil war. The rebel Free Syrian Army was created on 29 July 2011 and from then on, the struggle took the shape of an armed insurgency, with civil resistance disbanded and opposition members turning to arms. Many factions arose, either as break-offs of the Free Syrian Army or spontaneously in their own rights.

The killing of Muammar Gaddafi in Libya reportedly left a particularly strong and consequential impression on Putin. A senior diplomat who had served at the U.S. embassy in Moscow under the Obama administration reportedly claimed that "Putin had been appalled by Gaddafi's fate" to the extent that "Putin had watched a video of Gaddafi's savage death three times, a video that shows him being sodomised with a bayonet." Referring to the U.S. coalition's lobbying efforts for the airstrikes at the United Nations, the U.S. diplomat was quoted as saying that a later U.S. intelligence assessment concluded that "Putin blamed himself for letting Gaddafi go, for not playing a strong role behind the scenes" and that the video may have even influenced Putin's decision to support Syrian president Bashar al-Assad since "Putin believed that unless he got engaged Bashar would suffer the same fate – mutilated – and he'd see the destruction of his allies in Syria."

By 2012 it was reported the U.S. was running a covert operation in aid of militant groups fighting the Assad government.

On 6 March 2013, the Arab League gave its members the green light to arm the Syrian rebels. On 26 March 2013, at the Arab league summit in Doha, the League recognised the National Coalition for Syrian Revolutionary and Opposition Forces, as the legitimate representatives of the Syrian people.

Since 2014, a significant part of Syria's territory had been claimed by Islamic State (ISIL), an entity internationally recognised as a terrorist organization; a number of Western and other countries, most notably the U.S., Britain and France, began to participate in direct military action against ISIL in the territory of Syria.

== Presumed motives ==
=== Military facilities ===
The Russian naval facility in Tartus in Syria is Russia's only naval facility in the Mediterranean region and only remaining military facility outside the former USSR. In March 2012, critics saw the position of the naval facility in Tartus as a chief motivating factor for Russia to speak out in favor of the Assad government maintaining stability in the region.

=== Russian jihadists in Syria ===
At least since mid 2013, Chechen and other Russian North Caucasus volunteers have been fighting in the Syrian Civil War against the government of Bashar al-Assad. The Washington Post in 2014 reported that Moscow was concerned about such fighters returning to Russia after having picked up militant contacts in Syria.

As of September 2015, an estimated 2,500 Russian nationals were fighting alongside ISIL, and President Putin declared that their return to Russia would be a threat to Russia, and that it would be better to fight them on Syrian ground.

=== Economic importance and history of arms sales ===
Russia has been able to showcase its old and new weapons in the conflict which helped boost its arms sales to $15bn in 2015.

Russian economic interests in Syria, including arms sales, are offered as one of the reasons for its support of the government. However, according to Foreign Affairs, economic considerations are of less importance than geopolitical ones. This is especially due to the fact that many Syrian arms purchases are financed by loans.

== Casualties ==
Many Russian soldiers have died during the war. Russian officials estimate that as of January 2019, 112 soldiers have been killed since troops were sent to fight in Syria in 2015. The BBC has a higher estimation of 175 deaths having occurred from 2015 to the end of 2018.

In 2019, the Russian Armed Forces were accused of covering up the death one of its soldiers, junior sergeant Andranik Arustamyan. However, Arustamyan's family has defended the military and said that they were informed of his death.

== Political efforts and statements ==
=== 2011 ===
At the end of May 2011, the Russian Foreign Minister Sergei Lavrov said that Russia opposed United Nations' involvement in Syria because "the situation doesn't present a threat to international peace and security ... Syria is a very important country in the Middle East and destabilizing Syria would have repercussions far beyond its borders", and asserted that Assad had made attempts at major reform.

In June, both the US and other Western governments as well as Syrian protesters prevailed upon Russia to change its position, and finally a Syrian anti-government delegation visited Moscow and met with Russian envoy Mikhail Margelov, who after the meeting noted that "leaders come and go" and called for "an end to any and all forms of violence", which some interpreted to be a shift away from Assad, once a major ally, in foreign policy. "A harder line from Russia would be a blow to Syria which relies heavily on Russian military equipment and has long-standing ties to Moscow", the American nbcnews.com wrote that day.

On 19 July, Russian Prime minister, Dmitri Medvedev said he was working with German Chancellor Angela Merkel to find consensus for a strategy to persuade the Syrian government to abandon violence and begin a constructive dialogue with protesters. He did not threaten to use Russia's veto at the United Nations Security Council to oppose a resolution critical of the Syrian government, as Russia has previously said it could do. Medvedev also said it was imperative that Syria not slide into civil war the way Libya did in 2011.

Amid the siege of Hama, the Russian Foreign Ministry issued a statement on 1 August documenting deaths in Hama as well as condemning the violence, including the alleged killing of eight policemen by Assad's government. The statement beseeched the pro-Assad forces as well as the violent protesters to "exercise maximum restraint".

On 3 August, Russian UN ambassador Vitaly Churkin stated that Russia will not oppose a UN resolution condemning the violence in Syria as long as it does not include sanctions or other "pressures". Al Jazeera reported that Russia had "softened the blow" to the Assad government by insisting successfully that the UN would make a statement rather than a resolution on the matter. On 23 August, the Russian delegation to the UN, along with those of China and Cuba, took to the floor to denounce a UN inquiry into human rights violations by the Assad government. Vitaly Churkin stated that "We hope to see progress, we hope to see dialogue established in Syria. ... We think we should continue to work within the scope of that unified position."

On 26 August, Reuters reported that according to UN envoys, the effort by the US, France, the UK, Germany and Portugal to impose UN sanctions on Syria was meeting "fierce resistance" from Russia and China, with Vitaly Churkin threatening to use Russia's veto power. According to Reuters, the arms embargo included in the sanctions would prevent Russian firms (the main source of Syrian weaponry) from selling to Syria. Russia proposed a second "rival" resolution to be voted on, described as "toothless" by Western diplomats, which did not include sanctions or other punitive measures, but rather urged Syria to speed up the process of its reforms.

On 4 October, Russia and China exercised a double veto against a Western-drafted Security Council resolution. The resolution demanded an end to all violence in Syria, accountability for those responsible for it, condemned "grave and systematic" human rights violations, called for a political process, encouraged the opposition to take part in that, and said the Security Council would review Syria's compliance with the resolution in 30 days after which the council would "consider options", including unspecified "measures" under the United Nations Charter. The New York Times qualified that as "a weak reference to the possibility of sanctions against Damascus", while Russia had said it would not accept a resolution that included even a hint of sanctions. Russia and the other BRICS nations (Brazil, India, China, South Africa) argued that a UNSC resolution on Libya had been twisted to justify the NATO 2011 military intervention in Libya leading into war against the Libyan government and were determined not to repeat that. After this veto, an analyst of the Center for the Analysis of Middle East Conflicts said to the BBC Russian service: Assad has a better chance to resist than the opposition does to win, therefore Moscow is now simply betting on Assad.

In the days following their rejecting the Security Council resolution, both Russia and China issued public admonishments of the Syrian government, separately expressing their desire for the government to reform and respect the will of the Syrian people. "If the Syrian leadership is unable to complete such reforms, it will have to go, but this decision should be made not by NATO and certain European countries, it should be made by the people of Syria and the government of Syria," Medvedev told the Russian Security Council.

On 1 November, Sergei Lavrov said at a Russian-Gulf ministerial meeting that Russia would oppose the recent proposal for a no-fly zone in Syria as (in Russia's view) the no-fly zone in Libya had been used to "support one side in a civil war". Lavrov nonetheless stated, when asked if Russia was supporting the Assad government, that "we are not protecting any regime".

On 15 December, Russia proposed a UN Security Council resolution condemning the violence "by all parties, including disproportionate use of force by Syrian authorities". The draft resolution also raised concern over "the illegal supply of weapons to the armed groups in Syria". Western diplomats initially referred to the proposed resolution as a basis for negotiations. The proposal was an updated version of a Russian-Chinese draft resolution introduced to the Security Council a few months earlier.

=== 2012 ===
By the end of January 2012, a resolution proposal, competing with the Russian 15 December draft (see above), had been drafted by Western and Arab powers, which, in contrast, did not condemn violence by both sides in the conflict and did not rule out military intervention. Russia indicated that it would not agree to the Western-Arab draft in its current form, and that it would continue to promote its own resolution in the Security Council. On 4 February 2012, Russia and China vetoed that Western and Arab sponsored Security Council resolution, which urged Bashar al-Assad to adhere to a peace plan drafted by the Arab League.

On 7 February 2012, Russian Foreign Minister Sergei Lavrov, along with foreign intelligence chief Mikhail Fradkov, met with President Assad and reported to the world that President Assad was committed to reform of the constitution and electoral process. Additionally, the Russian delegation said that Syria alone held the power to change the fate of its people, without foreign intervention. In March, Lavrov said in a televised interview that Syria's leadership had ignored Russia's warnings and made "very many mistakes" that helped drag the country to the brink of civil war.

On 16 April, Russian Deputy Foreign Minister Mikhail Bogdanov and other Russian diplomats met with members of the Syrian opposition and Hassan Abdul-Azim, head of an opposition group, the National Coordination Committee for Democratic Change. When special U.N. envoy Kofi Annan developed a plan to end Syrian violence, Russia attempted to play a major role in the outcome of the plan by meeting with both the Assad government and opposition forces, while vetoing multiple plans during Security Council votes to accomplish the goals set forth by an international consensus.

On 20 April, the Security Council announced an agreement to expand the number of U.N. cease-fire observers in Syria from 30 to 300, as well as to allow Secretary-General Ban Ki-moon to decide on the peacekeepers' deployment based on conditions on the ground. Under the plan, Syrian violence would immediately stop and the Assad government would begin implementation of the Annan six-point peace plan. The draft was the result of two texts proposed by Russia and European Council members. When the texts were merged, the portion imposing sanctions on the Assad government for failure to comply with the peacekeeping plan was removed, as requested by Russia and China. The Russian draft also did not contain language dictating that U.N. peacekeepers' presence in Syria was a condition of Assad's agreement to return troops and heavy weapons to their barracks.

The United Nations Supervision Mission in Syria (UNSMIS) was passed by the U.N. Security Council on 21 April 2012, and deployed up to 300 unarmed observers to Syria for a period of up to 90 days. The plan also called for passage of the Annan peace plan, making unanimous passage of the resolution significant. After the peace plan was passed, Russian's U.N. ambassador Vitaly Churkin relayed Russia's support of the agreement to the media, while other nations expressed frustration with the process and lack of progress in ending the violence so far.

A Bloomberg article (April 2012) said that although Russia has tried to retain the image of a peacemaker in this conflict, Russian diplomats have repeatedly criticized the potential condemnation of Assad by western nations. Russia has also accused the West and allied nations of sabotaging a cease-fire brokered by Russia between Syrian forces.

In the aftermath of the Houla massacre (May 2012), Foreign Minister Sergey Lavrov said that "The government bears the main responsibility for what is going on" and that "Any government in any country bears responsibility for the security of its citizens". Russia's reaction was considered to be a condemnation of the Syrian government. However, Lavrov also stated that the rebels shared the blame for the killings, noting that some victims had been killed at close range in a district controlled by the opposition fighters. As talk of UN intervention intensified, a foreign affairs committee chair in the Russian government, hardened Russia's stance, moving it further away from the earlier condemnation of Damascus, saying that "We have very strong doubts that those people who were shot at point-blank [range] and were stabbed, that this was the action of forces loyal to President Assad. ... The shelling was probably ... the troops of Mr Assad, but the stabbing and point-blank firing was definitely from the other side."

According to Steve Rosenberg of the BBC in June 2012, Russia accused the US of setting double standards: US selling weapons to Bahrain and at the same time criticizing Russia for supporting Syrian President Assad with weapons. Russia feels that the US is acting hypocritically by expecting them to discontinue selling weapons to the Syrian government, since the US supplies Syrian rebels with weapons via Turkey. From Russia's perspective, if US aids the Syrian opposition, they are indirectly, undermining Russia's national security. BBC commented that Russia expects only one of two outcomes to take place in the Syrian civil war: either Assad stays in power, ensuring their stronghold influence in the middle east region, or, radical Islamists take over, creating a terror threat for Russia.

=== 2013 ===
On 11 June 2013, President Vladimir Putin acknowledged that President Assad's not undertaking any "reform" had led to the current situation in Syria. He stated on Russian state media that: "Syria as a country was rife for some kind of change. And the government of Syria should have felt that in due time and should have undertaken some reform. Had they done that, what we're seeing in Syria today would have never happened."

On 26 June 2013, the Deputy Russian Foreign Minister said that the small Russian naval base at Tartus has been evacuated. Mikhail Bogdanov stated that: "Presently, the Russian Defense Ministry has not a single person stationed in Syria. The base does not have any strategic military importance".

On 9 September 2013, responding to U.S. threats of strikes against Syria in response to use of chemical weapons in Syria, Russian Foreign Minister Sergey Lavrov issued a proposal intended to avert a U.S. attack, with provisions including Syria's placing its chemical weapons under international control and their subsequent destruction.

On 12 September 2013, The New York Times published an op-ed by Vladimir Putin urging the United States to avoid unilateral military action and work with international cooperation in support of a negotiated solution to the Syrian conflict.

=== 2015 ===
==== September ====
On 15 September 2015, in Dushanbe at a meeting of the Russian-led Collective Security Treaty Organization, Putin called for a united, international effort together with Syria to fight the threat of ISIL but also said that Syrian President Assad "is ready to integrate the same [healthy] part of the opposition into the state's administration".

On 27 September, President Vladimir Putin stated, in an interview with CBS's '60 Minutes': "More than 2,000 terrorist-fighters from Russia and ex-Soviet republics are in the territory of Syria. There is a threat of their return to us. So, instead of waiting for their return, we are helping President al-Assad fight them".

In the United Nations General Assembly, 28 September 2015, President Putin seemed to lay at least part of the responsibility for the Syrian Civil War with unnamed powers that had been "pushing" for "democratic revolution" in Syria:

... We all know that after the end of the Cold War, a single center of domination emerged in the world. ...

... We are all different. And we should respect that. No one has to conform to a single development model that someone has once and for all recognized as the only right one.

... Attempts to push for changes within other countries based on ideological preferences often led to tragic consequences and to degradation rather than progress. It seems however, that far from learning from others' mistakes, everyone just keeps repeating them. And so the export of revolutions, this time of so-called "democratic" ones, continues. Suffice it to look at the situation in the Middle East and North Africa. ... Instead of the triumph of democracy and progress we got violence, poverty and a social disaster. ... It is now obvious that the power vacuum created in some countries of the Middle East and North Africa led to emergence of anarchy areas. Those immediately started to be filled with extremists and terrorists. Tens of thousands of militants are fighting under the banners of the so-called "Islamic State". ... And now the ranks of radicals are being joined by the members of the so-called "moderate" Syrian opposition supported by the Western countries. First, they are armed and trained, and then they defect to the Islamic State.

... Russia has always been firm and consistent in opposing terrorism in all its forms. Today, we provide military and technical assistance both to Iraq and Syria that are fighting terrorist groups. We think it is an enormous mistake to refuse to cooperate with the Syrian government and its Armed Forces ... We should finally acknowledge that no one but President Assad's Armed Forces and Kurd militia are truly fighting the Islamic State and other terrorist organizations in Syria. ...

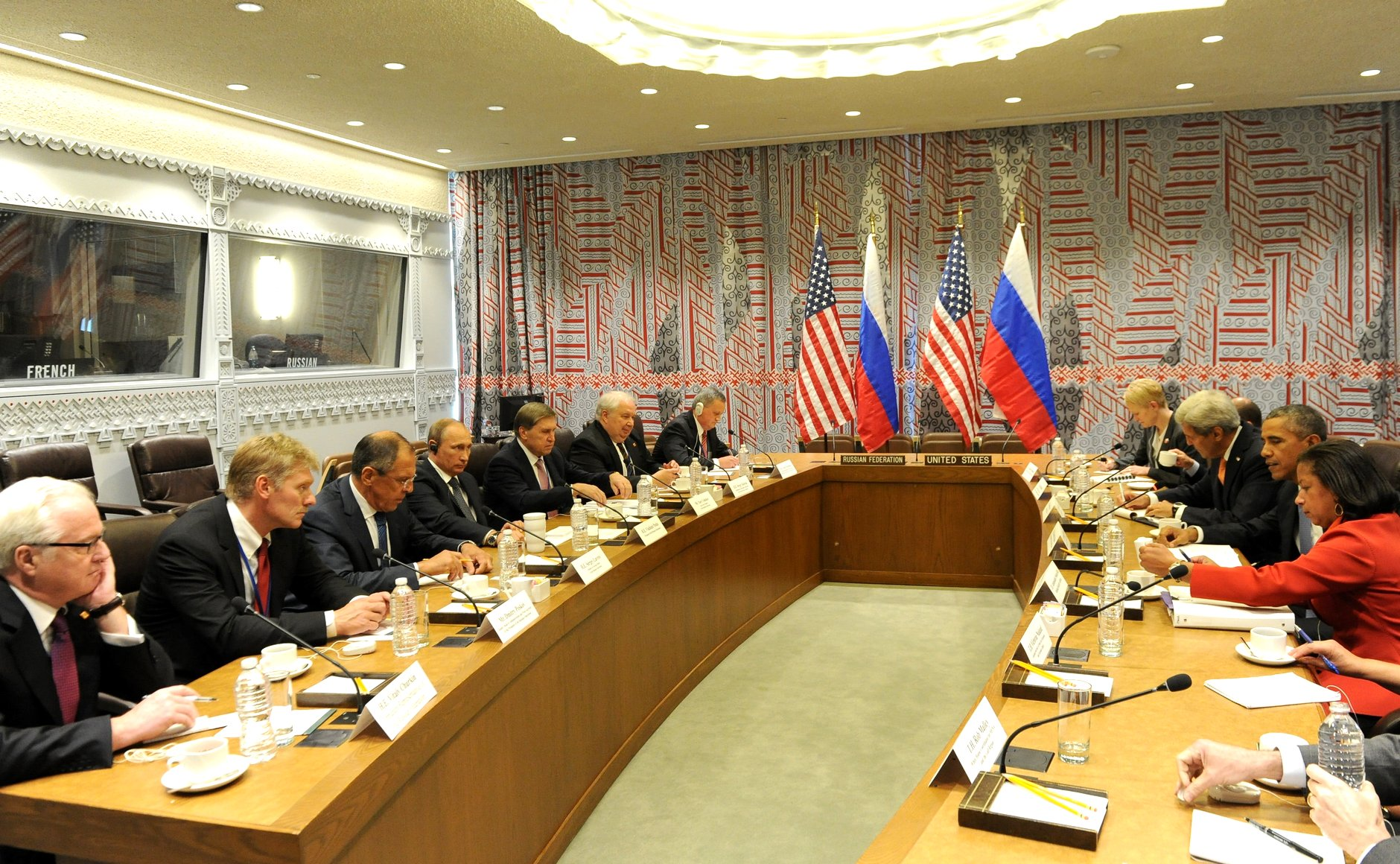
Russian and U.S. representatives meet to discuss the situation in Syria on 29 September 2015

Putin again called for cooperation with the Syrian government in fighting terrorism: "we should acknowledge that no-one except for Assad and his militia are truly fighting Isis in Syria."

==== October ====
On 1 October 2015, President Vladimir Putin dismissed unidentified media reports of alleged casualties among civilians caused by Russian airstrikes in Syria as "information warfare" against Russia, stating that the claims had begun before the planes used in the airstrikes had even taken off.

On 12 October, Putin appealed to members of the American-led intervention in Syria to join the Russian intervention in the Syrian civil war, highlighting the legality of Russia's intervention at Syria's request and questioning whether the U.S. one was valid at all. He highlighted the legitimate authority of Syria's fledgling constitutional democracy and lambasted the scrapped Pentagon program funding rebel training in Syria, saying "It would have been better to give us $500 million. At least we would have used it more effectively from the point of view of fighting international terrorism."

On 13 October, Putin criticized the leaders of the American-led intervention in Syria for sending arms to the area that could end up in the wrong hands. He also criticized the American decision not to share with Russia information regarding potential ISIL targets, adding that American side does not seem to have a clear understanding of what really happens in the country and what goals they are seeking to achieve.

In mid-October, Russian prime minister Dmitry Medvedev, talking of the U.S. government's refusal to engage in dialogue with Russia on cooperation in Syria, called this a "silly behavior": "As a result of these decisions and the cancellation of talks, the Americans have demonstrated their weakness." He added Russia remained open to discussion of "any issues".

== Russian peace initiatives and efforts ==
On 30 January 2012, the Russian foreign ministry suggested "informal" talks in Moscow between the Syrian regime and opposition, and said the Syrian authorities had already agreed to the Russian offer. Abdel Baset Seda, a member of the Syrian National Council's executive committee, told Reuters that the SNC had not received any formal invitation for such talks, but would decline if one arrived: "Our position has not changed and it is that there is no dialogue with (President Bashar al-Assad)".

According to Martti Ahtisaari who held discussions about Syria with the five permanent members of the United Nations Security Council in February 2012, a Russian three-point plan, put forth by its ambassador, Vitaly Churkin included a proposal for Assad to cede power. The plan also required the Syrian government and the opposition to come to the negotiating table. It was ignored by the US, Britain and France, because at the time they thought that Assad's regime was about to fall.

7 November 2013, Russia again announced it was trying to broker talks in Moscow between the Syrian government and opposition, seeing that the U.S. and Russian negotiators failed to agree on whether or not Assad should be forced out of office. Russia's Deputy Foreign Minister Bogdanov said the Moscow talks could focus on humanitarian problems as well on some political issues.

At the end of October 2015, on the initiative of Russia, Iran was for the first time invited to participate in the Syria peace talks in Vienna.

On 22 February 2016, in Munich, foreign ministers of Russia and the U.S., as co-chairs of the ISSG, announced that they had concluded a deal to seek a nationwide "cessation of hostilities" in Syria that came into effect on 27 February 2016 at 00:00 (Damascus time).

On 23 February 2016, the Russian defence ministry inaugurated the Russian Reconciliation Center headquartered at its Khmeimim base, which was billed as a step undertaken in accordance with arrangements between Russia and the U.S.

== Military support for the Syrian government ==
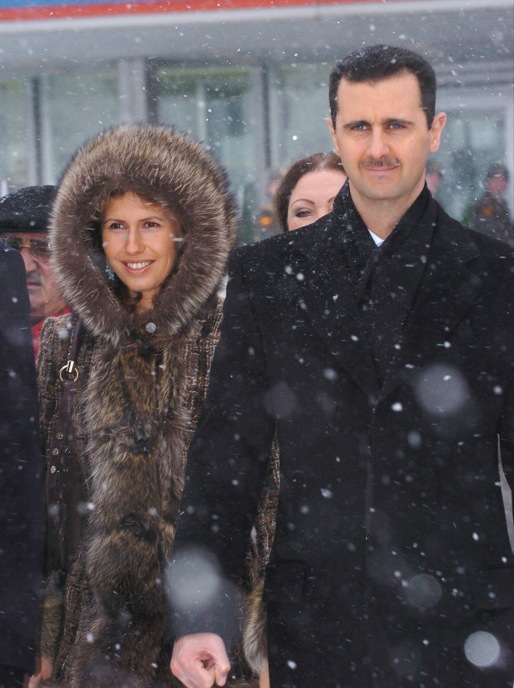
Bashar and Asma al-Assad during a visit to Moscow (image taken in 2005)

=== Military assistance prior to the intervention ===
From early stages of the Syrian conflict, Russia, under its contractual obligations, delivered ammunition and weapons to the Syrian government; in early 2012 Russia's contracts with Syria for arms were unofficially estimated to be worth 1.5 billion US dollars, comprising 10% of Russia's global arms sales. The arms sales to the Syrian government provoked criticism on the part of Western as well as some Arab nations. The Russian government dismissed criticism noting that the arms sales to Syria did not violate any standing arms embargoes. On 1 June 2012, shortly after the Houla massacre, Russia's foreign ministry in turn blamed the massacre, in which 108 people were said to have been killed, on foreign assistance to Syrian rebels, including arms deliveries and mercenary training: "The tragedy in Houla showed what can be the outcome of financial aid and smuggling of modern weapons to rebels, recruitment of foreign mercenaries and flirting with various sorts of extremists".

Besides providing the refurbished MI-25 helicopter gunships, Russia was also said to have transferred to Syria the Buk-M2 air defense system, the Bastion coastal defence missile system, and Yak-130 combat jet trainer. Russian shipments of fuel have also assisted Assad, and an unspecified number of military advisers are teaching Syrians how to use Russian weapons. The head of Russia's federal service for military-technical co-operation confirmed that the repaired Syrian MI-25 attack helicopters were "ready to be delivered on time" adding that "Syria is our friend, and we fulfill all our obligations to our friends". Amnesty International, noting the Syrian government's headlong deployment of military helicopters, criticised Russia: "Anyone supplying attack helicopters – or maintaining, repairing or upgrading them – for the Syrian government displays a wanton disregard for humanity." Human Rights Watch warned Russia's state-owned arms-trading company Rosoboronexport in a letter that, under international law, "providing weapons to Syria while crimes against humanity are being committed may translate into assisting in the commission of those crimes", and called on governments and companies around the world to stop signing new contracts and consider suspending current dealings with the Russian company.

In May 2013, Israeli Prime Minister, Benjamin Netanyahu traveled to Moscow in a bid to convince Russian president Vladimir Putin not to sell S-300 surface-to-air missile batteries and 144 missiles to Assad's government. The long-range air defense system would be a leap for Syria's current air defense system, enabling them to down fighter planes and cruise missiles.

The Assad government was reported to have used Russian-supplied MI-8 and Mi-17 helicopters to carry out barrel-bomb attacks in Homs. According to former senior American intelligence official Jeffrey White, Russia was most likely providing spare parts such as engines, transmissions and rotors.

In January 2014, a Russian company AR 514 (514 авиационный ремонтный завод) posted photos in their portfolio showing them performing repairs and upgrade on Su-24 identified to belong to Syrian fleet. In 2015 Assad confirmed in an interview that Russia has been supplying arms to Syria based on contracts signed before and after the beginning of the conflict.

Syrian officers and air defence personnel were trained in Russia.

=== 2015–16 intervention and airstrikes ===
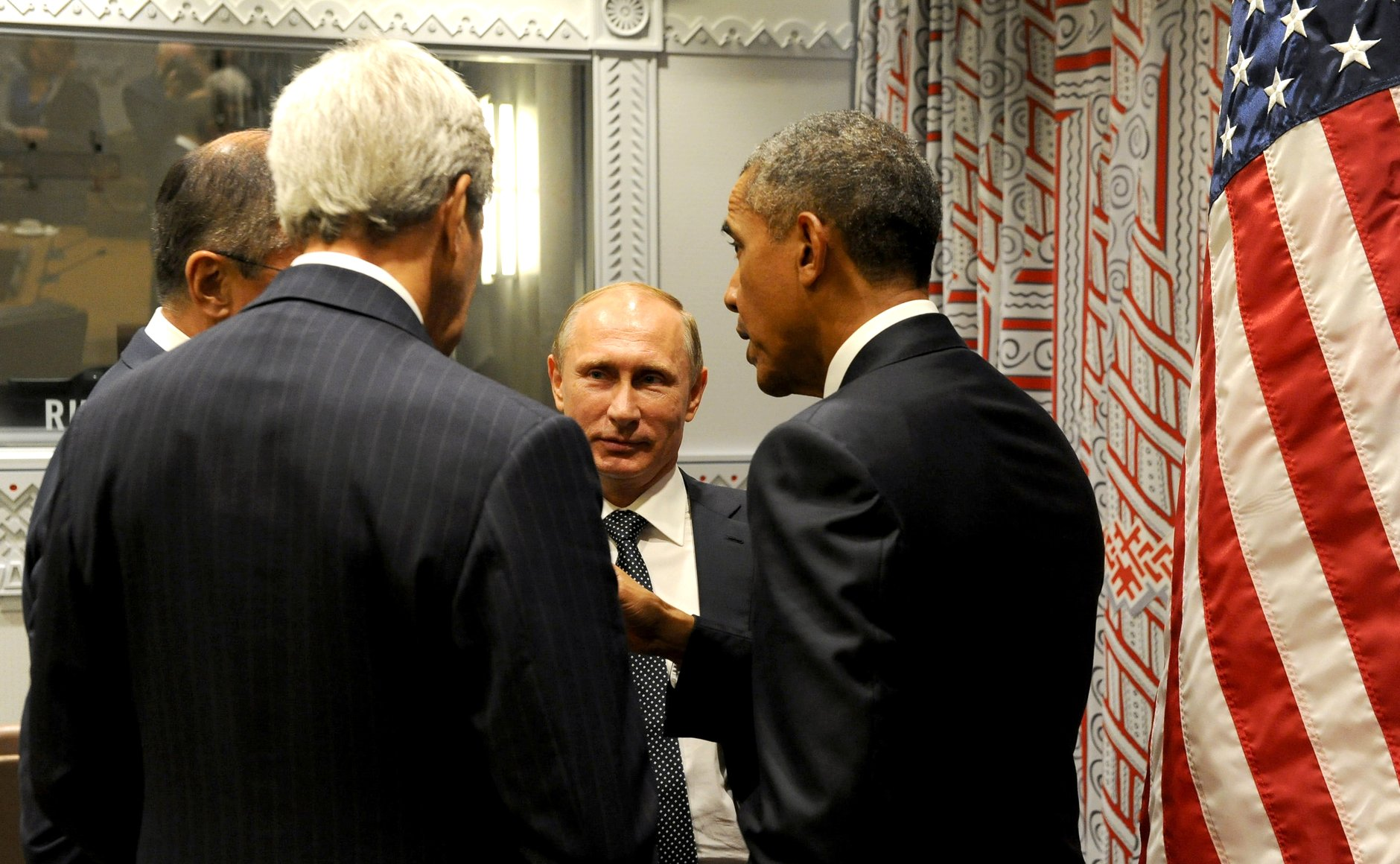
Barack Obama meets with Vladimir Putin to discuss Syria, 29 September 2015

As of September 2015, Russia has stepped up its military presence in Syria, deploying 12 Su-25 ground attack aircraft, 12 Su-24 interdictor aircraft, 6 Sukhoi Su-34 medium bombers and 4 Su-30 multirole combat aircraft and 15 helicopters (including Mi-24 attack helicopters) at the Latakia International Airport. The planes are protected by at least two or possibly three SA-22 surface-to-air, antiaircraft systems, and unarmed MQ-1 Predator-like surveillance drones are being used to fly reconnaissance missions. In addition to air forces, ground forces include 6 T-90 tanks, 15 artillery pieces, 35 armored personnel carriers and 200 Marines (with housing facilities for 1,500 personnel) BM-30 multiple missile launchers have been spotted near Latakia.

On 30 September 2015, Russian President Vladimir Putin requested permission from Federation Council, the upper house of the Russian parliament, to deploy the country's military in Syria. On the same day, Federation Council approved the use of Russian military in Syria to fight terrorist groups, the Islamic State in particular. Permission was granted after a unanimous vote, however any combat operations will be limited to using the air force. Russian media reported that Syrian President Bashar al-Assad had asked for Russia to intervene by providing military assistance.

On 30 September 2015, Russia launched its first airstrikes against targets in Rastan, Talbiseh, and Zafaraniya in Homs province of Syria. Moscow gave the United States a one-hour advance notice of its operations. The Homs area is crucial to President Bashar al-Assad's control of western Syria. Insurgent control of the area would separate the coastal cities of Latakia- where Russian aircraft are based- and Tartous, where Russia operates a naval facility from Damascus.

On 1 October 2015, the Russian defence ministry spokesman said Russia had deployed over 50 aircraft (including also Su-34) in Syria: "The air group was deployed on very short notice. We have been able to do it, as most of the materiel and ammunition had already been there, at our depot in Tartus. We only had to move our aircraft and deliver some equipment."

At the end of December 2015, senior U.S. officials privately admitted that Russia, while maintaining a relatively light military footprint, had achieved its central goal of stabilising the Assad government and, with the costs relatively low and minimal casualties, could sustain the operation at this level for years to come.

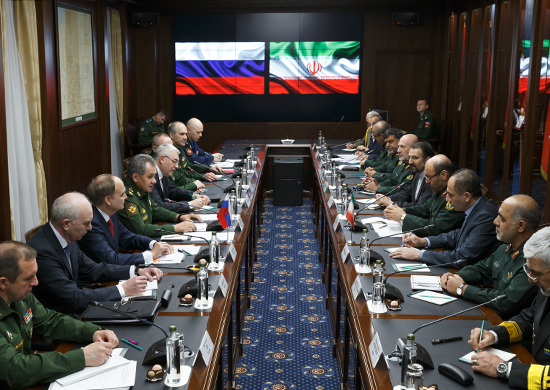
Russian Defense Minister Sergey Shoygu with Iranian Defense Minister Hossein Dehghan, 16 February 2016

In February 2016, the Russian Ambassador to Syria said that part of Russia's arms deliveries to the Syrian government was gratis or on easy terms.

In March 2016, the strategic city of Palmyra was recaptured by the Syrian Army after a large-scale offensive supported by Russian airstrikes.

=== Role of private contractors ===
Officially, Russia is participating only in an air war over Syria, with a small number of special and support troops on the ground. However, in November 2016 Reuters published a report that contained evidence that Russian forces were playing a more substantial role in ground combat by employing contractors recruited through private agencies registered in foreign jurisdictions. According to the report, despite their unofficial status, these troops operated in coordination with Russia's regular military and were given benefits back home normally available to serving soldiers. Russian contractors fighting in Syria are reportedly paid $6,500 a month.

According to publications by Russian media, Russian contract fighters had taken part in combat in Syria before the formal Russian intervention began in September 2015. According to an official in a Ukrainian law enforcement agency, at least 1,700 Russian contractors have been deployed to Syria, many of whom had earlier served in Ukraine.

== Russian nationals fighting for rebel/jihadist groups ==
In May 2016, Reuters published a Special Report titled "How Russia allowed homegrown radicals to go and fight in Syria" that, based on first-hand accounts, said that at least in the period between 2012 and 2014 the Russian government agencies appeared to run a programme to facilitate and encourage Russian radicals and militants to leave Russia and go to Turkey and then on to Syria; the persons in question had joined jihadist groups, some fighting with the ISIL.

A top leader of ISIL, Abu Omar al-Shishani, initially led a group of several hundred fighters, mostly from ex-Soviet states. In June 2016 Nikolai Bordyuzha estimated that 10,000 militants from ex-Soviet states were fighting alongside jihadist groups in the Middle East, including Syria. In July 2016, the British press cited ″experts″ as believing that ISIL fielded at least three exclusively Russian-speaking "Caucasian" (often led by Chechens) battalions of about 150 men each.

== Cooperation attempts with U.S. and UK ==
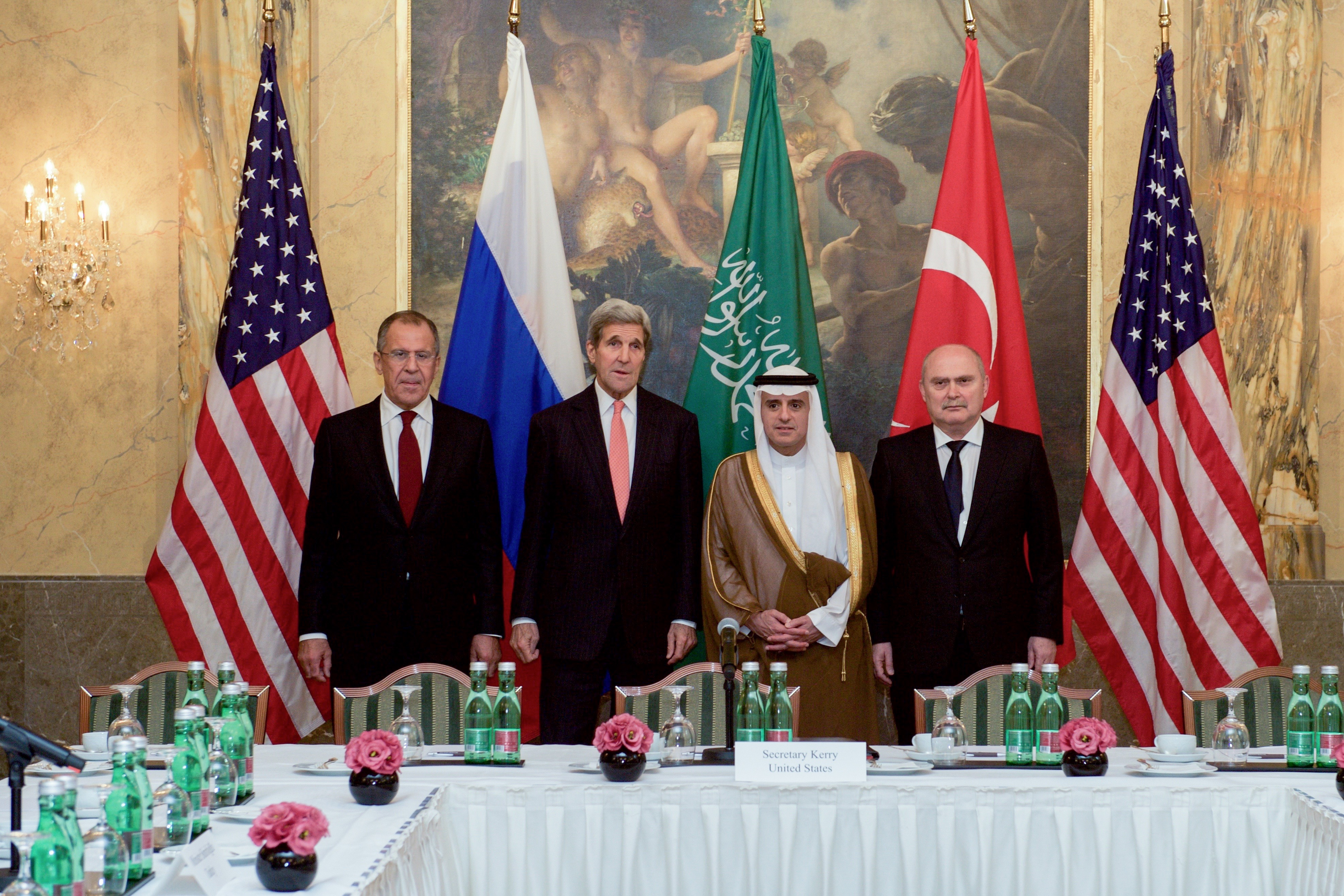
The foreign ministers of the US, Russia, Turkey, and Saudi Arabia in Vienna, before a four-way discussion focused on Syria, October 29, 2015

Putin's proposal, mid-October 2015, that the U.S. receive a high-level Russian delegation and that a U.S. delegation arrive in Moscow to discuss coordinated action against terrorism in Syria was declined by both the United States and the United Kingdom.

== Discussing a long-term political settlement ==
On 20 October 2015, three weeks into the Russian military campaign in Syria, Russian President Vladimir Putin met Syrian President Bashar al-Assad in Moscow to discuss their joint military campaign "against terrorism" and "a long-term settlement, based on a political process that involves all political forces, ethnic and religious groups" in Syria.

== Reactions ==
=== Domestic ===
In May 2012, the Russian Orthodox Church and its primate Patriarch Kirill I were reported by the U.S. mainstream press to be supportive of the existing government in Syria; the Church's leadership alluded to the potential threat to Christians in Syria that had comprised 10% of the country's population.

In September 2015, one of Russia's Muslim (Sunni) leaders, Chief Mufti Talgat Tadzhuddin said: "We fully back the use of a contingent of Russian armed forces in the battle against international terrorism."

In November 2015, Tadzhuddin publicly claimed that he had proposed to Vladimir Putin that Syria be annexed.

In early January 2016, Patriarch Kirill publicly endorsed Russia's military operation in Syria, saying that the campaign in that country that "is literally our neighbour" was "defence of the fatherland".

In May 2019, The Moscow Times reported that "Fifty-five percent of Russian respondents say their country should end its military campaign in Syria, up from 49 percent in August 2017, according to a poll published by Levada". According to an August 2019 poll by Public Opinion Foundation, only 10% of Russians see the Russian military intervention in the Syrian Civil War as a "success".

=== Foreign ===
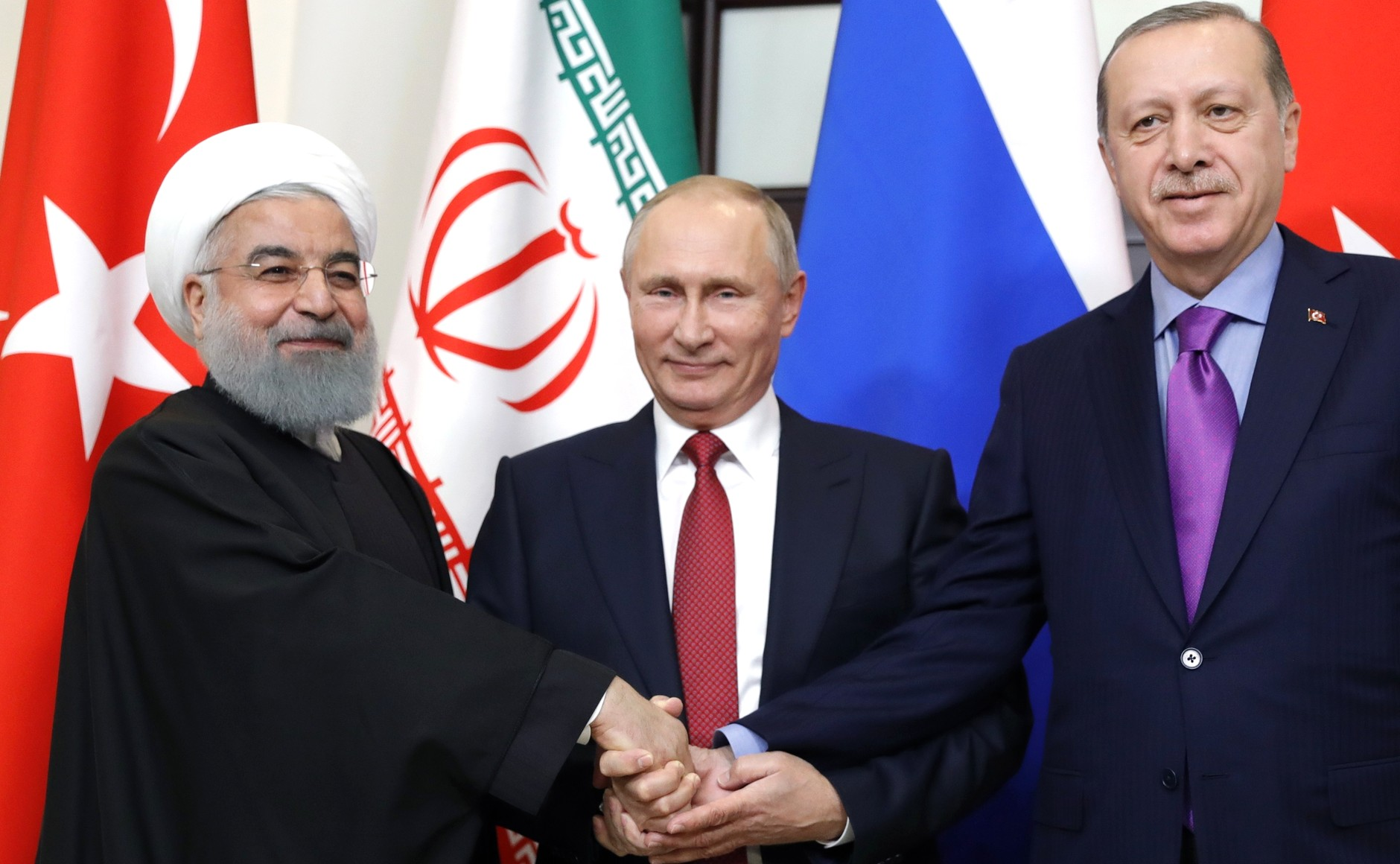
Vladimir Putin, Hassan Rouhani, Recep Tayyip Erdoğan. Russia, 2017

In January 2012, Human Rights Watch criticised Russia for "repeating the mistakes of Western governments during the Arab Spring by continuing to support a longstanding authoritarian ally [Assad] whose people have clearly expressed the desire for democratic change". The human rights group also accused Russia of selectively using one of its reports to support a one-sided position on Syria.

Former UK ambassador to Russia from 2004 to 2008, Tony Brenton, said in April 2012 that Russia is looking – in Syria – for its first opportunity since the Cold War to boost its brokering abilities.

In October 2015, Robert Fisk, Middle East correspondent for The Independent, wrote: "The Russian air force in Syria has flown straight into the West's fantasy air space. The Russians, we are now informed, are bombing the "moderates" in Syria – "moderates" whom even the Americans admitted two months ago, no longer existed."

The New York Times opined that with anti-government insurgents in Syria receiving for the first time bountiful supplies of U.S.-made anti-tank missiles and with Russia raising the number of airstrikes against the government's opponents that had raised morale in both camps, broadening war objectives and hardening political positions, the conflict was turning into an all-out proxy war between the U.S. and Russia. This analysis was shared by the Dutch quality newspaper NRC Handelsblad that drew parallels with the situation in Afghanistan in the 1980s. In 2016 Pulitzer Prize-winning journalist Seymour Hersh expressed the view that Russia's military campaign against militant groups in Syria was "very good" and more effective than the U.S.-led campaigns, stating "I don't know why we persist on living in the Cold War, but we do. Russia actually did a very good job. They … did the bombing that was more effective than what we do, I think that's fair to say."

- US: The US-led coalition that is launching its own airstrikes against ISIS demanded that Russia stop attacking targets other than ISIS. "We call on the Russian Federation to immediately cease its attacks on the Syrian opposition and civilians and to focus its efforts on fighting ISIL," said the US-led coalition. it also objected to Assad's participation in the intelligence sharing. By the opposition other than ISIS it is meant the groups have received training and weapons from US and other Assad's enemies. "We do not support the presence of Syrian government officials who are part of a regime that has brutalized its own citizens," said Col. Steven H. Warren, the spokesman for the US-led coalition.
- United Kingdom: "They are backing the butcher Assad, which is a terrible mistake, for them and the world," said British Prime Minister David Cameron.

== See also ==
- Foreign involvement in the Syrian civil war
- Russia–Syria–Iran–Iraq coalition
