= International Conference on the Peaceful Uses of Atomic Energy =

Series of meetings in 1955 in Geneva, Switzerland

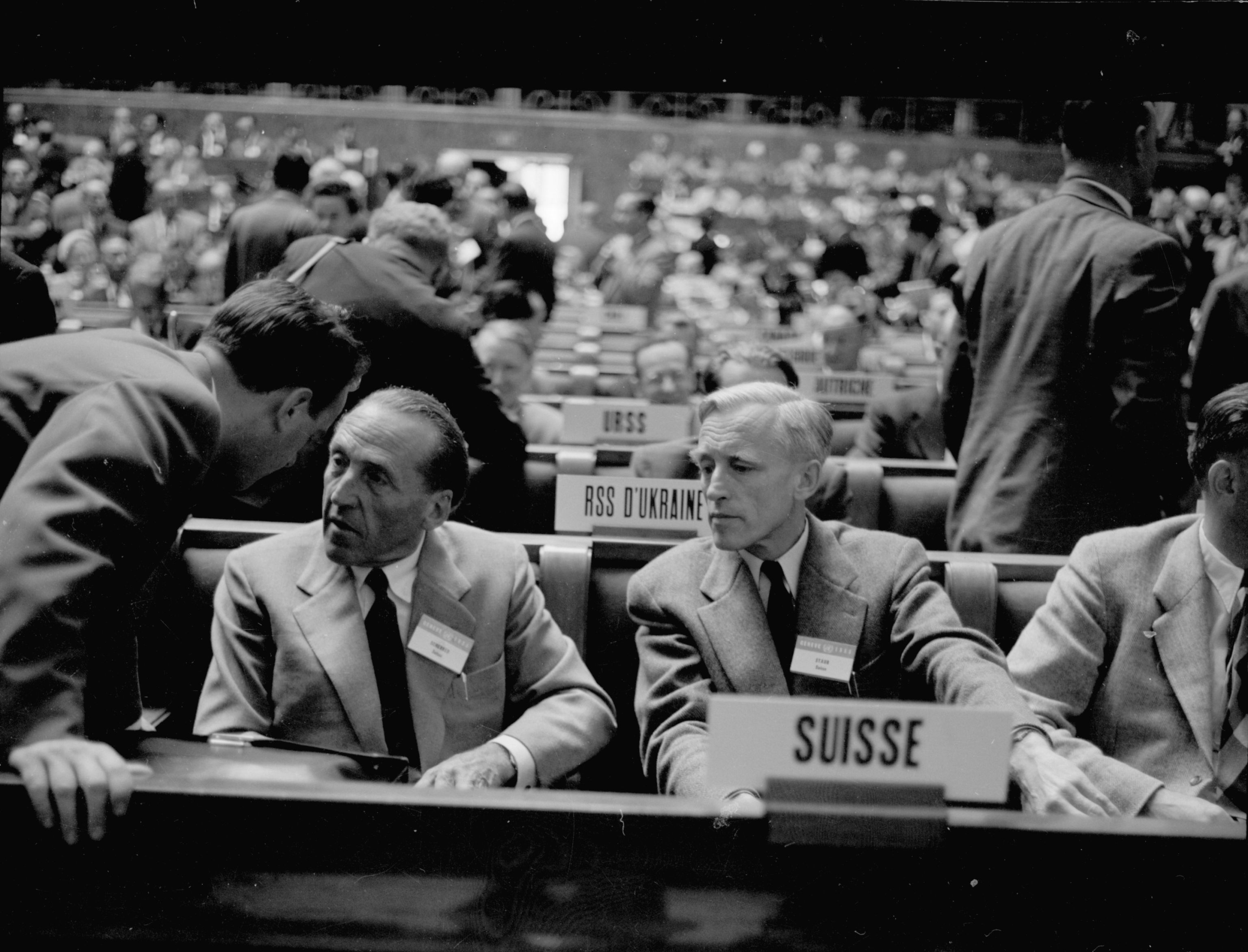
Swiss delegates at the 1955 conference, the nuclear physicists Paul Scherrer and Hans H. Staub.

The International Conference on the Peaceful Uses of Atomic Energy was a series of expert meetings in Geneva, Switzerland, focusing on civilian uses of nuclear energy and developments in nuclear engineering. Four conferences were hosted in total, each with significant contributions from nations with nuclear programs and expertise in the field, e.g. the United States, Soviet Union, Great Britain, and India. Large volumes of unclassified information were shared and documented in the United Nations' proceedings.

The first conference, held in Geneva from 8 to 20 August 1955, was organized by Danish physicist Niels Bohr, who played a central role in promoting international cooperation on the peaceful uses of nuclear energy. During the conference on 10th August 1955, Bohr delivered an address titled “Physical Science and Man’s Position,” in which he reflected on the broader implications of atomic science and humanity’s role, speaking as part of the program of evening lectures given at the conference.

No.	Date
1.	August 8 to 20, 1955
2.	September 1 to 13, 1958
3.	August 31 to September 9, 1964
4.	September 6 to 16, 1971

Before the conference, the Atoms for Peace program set the course for international cooperation and a comprehensive effort to address nuclear issues during the Cold War. Shortly after the first meeting in 1957, the International Atomic Energy Agency (IAEA) was founded with the mission to promote the peaceful use of nuclear energy. Through the Nuclear Non-Proliferation Treaty (NPT) of 1968, the IAEA was also tasked with preventing the diversion of nuclear technology and materials for military purposes.

== Publications ==
Large quantities of scientific papers, colloquially known (at the time) as the Geneva Papers, were published in book form for the conferences. The publications are in English, although some translations have also been published. Individual books have been digitized and made available through the UN Archives (see citations and web links).

=== Proceedings of the International Conference on the Peaceful Uses of Atomic Energy (8–20 August 1955) ===
Vol.	Title
1	The World’s Requirements for Energy; The Role of Nuclear Power
2	Physics; Research Reactors
3	Power Reactors
4	Cross Sections important to Reactor Design
5	Physics of Reactor Design
6	Geology of Uranium and Thorium
7	Nuclear Chemistry and the Effects of Irradiation
8	Production Technology of the Materials Used for Nuclear Energy
9	Reactor Technology and Chemical Processing
10	Radioactive Isotopes and Nuclear Radiations in Medicine
11	Biological Effects of Radiation
12	Radioactive Isotopes and Ionizing Radiations in Agriculture, Physiology and Biochemistry
13	Legal, Administrative, Health and Safety Aspects of Large-Scale Use of Nuclear Energy
14	General Aspects of the Use of Radioactive Isotopes; Dosimetry
15	Applications of Radioactive isotopes and Fission Products in Research and Industry
16	Record of the Conference
17	Index of the Proceedings

=== Proceedings of the 2nd United Nations International Conference on the Peaceful Uses of Atomic Energy (1–13 September 1958) ===
Vol.	Title
1	Progress in Atomic Energy
2	Survey of Raw Material Resources
3	Processing of Raw Materials
4	Production of Nuclear Materials and Isotopes
5	Properties of Reactor Materials
6	Basic Metallurgy and Fabrication of Fuels
7	Reactor Technology
8	Nuclear Power Plants, Part 1
9	Nuclear Power Plants, Part 2
10	Research Reactors
11	Reactor Safety and Control
12	Reactor Physics
13	Reactor Physics and Economics
14	Nuclear Physics and Instrumentation
15	Physics in Nuclear Energy
16	Nuclear Data and Reactor Theory
17	Processing Irradiated Fuels and Radioactive Materials
18	Waste Treatment and Environmental Aspects of Atomic Energy
19	The Use of Isotopes: Industrial Use
20	Isotopes in Research
21	Health and Safety: Dosimetry and Standards
22	Biological effects of Radiation
23	Experience in Radiological Protection
24	Isotopes in Biochemistry and Physiology, Part 1
25	Isotopes in Biochemistry and Physiology, Part 2
26	Isotopes in Medicine
27	Isotopes in Agriculture
28	Basic Chemistry in Nuclear Energy
29	Chemical Effects of Radiation
30	Fundamental Physics
31	Theoretical and Experimental Aspects of Controlled Nuclear Fusion
32	Controlled Fusion Devices
33	Index of the Proceedings

=== Proceedings of the 3rd International Conference on the Peaceful Uses of Atomic Energy (31 August - 9 September 1964) ===
Vol.	Title
1	Progress in Atomic Energy
2	Reactor Physics
3	Reactor Studies and Performance
4	Reactor Control
5	Nuclear Reactors – I. Gas-cooled and Water-cooled Reactors
6	Nuclear Reactors – II. Fast Reactors and Advanced Concepts
7	Research and Testing Reactors
8	Reactor Engineering and Equipment
9	Reactor Materials
10	Nuclear Fuels – I. Fabrication and Reprocessing
11	Nuclear Fuels – II. Types and Economics
12	Nuclear Fuels – Ill. Raw Materials
13	Nuclear Safety
14	Environmental Aspects of Atomic Energy and Waste Management
15	Special Aspects of Nuclear Energy and Isotope Applications
16	List of Papers and Indexes

=== Proceedings of the 4th International Conference on the Peaceful Uses of Atomic Energy (6 - 16 September 1971) ===
Vol.	Title
1	Opening and closing speeches; special talks; world energy needs and resources, and the role of nuclear energy; national and international organizations; narrative of the exhibits
2	Performance of nuclear plants; costing of nuclear plants; fuel management
3	Safety aspects of nuclear plants; legal aspects of nuclear energy
4	Integration of nuclear plants in electrical networks; integrated planning of nuclear industry; fuel materials technology
5	Breeder and advanced converter reactors
6	Small and medium power reactors; desalination and agro-industrial complexes; role of research reactors; impact of nuclear energy in developing countries
7	Advanced energy concepts; peaceful nuclear explosions; special applications, including ship propulsion; controlled thermonuclear reactions; application of transuranium isotopes
8	Uranium and thorium ore resources; fuel fabrication and reprocessing
9	Isotope enrichment; fuel cycles; safeguards
10	Effects of irradiation on fuels and materials
11	Health physics and radiation protection; radioactive waste management; the environment and public acceptance
12	Nuclear methods in food production; education and training, and public information
13	Medical applications; radiation biology
14	Applications of nuclear techniques in industry and natural resources
15	Indexes and lists

== Literature ==
- AEC (1955). Atoms for Peace.
- "First International Conference on the Peaceful uses of Atomic Energy". The British Journal of Radiology. 28 (332): 452. August 1955. doi:10.1259/0007-1285-28-332-452. ISSN 0007-1285.
- IAEA (1964). "The third Geneva Conference". IAEA Bulletin. 6 (4): 3–4. ISSN 0020-6067.
- "The fourth Geneva conference". IAEA Bulletin. 13 (5): 2–18. 1971. ISSN 0020-6067.
- Cockcroft, John (30 June 1959). "The Peaceful Uses of Atomic Energy". Journal of the Royal Society of Medicine. 52 (7): 487–493. doi:10.1177/003591575905200701. PMC 1870737. PMID 19994002.
- Rupp, A. F. (1973). "Peaceful Uses of Atomic Energy". Nuclear Technology. 19 (3): 207–208. Bibcode:1973NucTe..19..207R. doi:10.13182/NT73-A15885. ISSN 0029-5450.
