= U.S.–Russia peace proposals on Syria =

The U.S.–Russia peace proposals on Syria refers to several American–Russian initiatives, including joint United States–Russia proposal issued in May 2013 to organize a conference for obtaining a political solution to the Syrian Civil War. The conference was eventually mediated by Lakhdar Brahimi, the United Nations peace envoy for Syria.

Following the Ghouta chemical attacks in August 2013, which caused an international criticism of the Syrian chemical arsenal, the United States and Russia reached an agreement on Framework for Elimination of Syrian Chemical Weapons.

However, by 2015, it is reported from CNN that there are at least 500 military personnel in Syria, and Russia sent more troops to Syria. US announced that it would keep a very close eye on Russia's moves in Syria.

== Timeline ==
=== 2013 proposals ===
A joint United States–Russia proposal was issued in May 2013 to organize a peace conference on Syria

The effectiveness of the negotiations and possible conference were questioned by Andrew Tabler of the Washington Institute for Near East Policy, who stated: "Washington is using the conference to buy time, but buy time for what? The country is melting down."

=== Geneva II ===
The Geneva II is a United Nations (UN) backed peace conference that took place in Geneva in January 2014 with the aim of stopping the Syrian Civil War and organizing a transition period and post-war reconstruction.

In a previous Geneva meeting on 30 June 2012 (i.e. "Geneva I"), "major powers" agreed on the principle of a political transition, "but failed to stop the war". The key aim of Geneva II would be to get all parties to agree on the principle of a political solution, and then build on Kofi Annan's peace plan and the 30 June 2012 meeting.

=== Chemical arsenal disposal agreement ===
Following Ghouta chemical attacks in Syria in August 2013, the United States Congress began debating a proposed Authorization for the Use of Military Force Against the Government of Syria to Respond to Use of Chemical Weapons (S.J.Res 21), although votes on the resolution were indefinitely postponed amid opposition from many legislators and tentative agreement between Obama and Russian President Vladimir Putin on an alternative proposal, under which Syria would declare and surrender its chemical weapons to be destroyed under international supervision.

=== February 2016 U.S.–Russia brokered UNSC ceasefire resolution ===
On 26 February 2016, the United Nations Security Council adopted Resolution 2268 that demanded all parties to comply with the terms of a U.S.–Russian deal on a "cessation of hostilities". The cease-fire came into effect on 27 February 2016. By July 2016, this ceasefire had mostly unraveled and violence again escalated.

=== September 2016 U.S.–Russia brokered ceasefire ===
On 10 September 2016, Russia and U.S. reached a deal on establishing a cease-fire between the Syrian Assad government and a US-supported coalition of so-called 'mainstream Syrian opposition rebel groups' including umbrella group 'High Negotiations Committee' (HNC), effective from 12 September, while jointly agreeing to continue attacks on Jabhat Fateh al-Sham (former al-Nusra Front) and Islamic State of Iraq and the Levant (ISIL). Russian Foreign Minister Sergei Lavrov said that Russia and U.S. had developed five documents to enable coordination of the fight against Jabhat Fateh al-Sham and ISIL and a revival of Syria's failed truce in an enhanced form.

But on 16 September, the heaviest fighting since weeks broke out at the outskirts of Damascus and air attacks elsewhere in Syria resumed. On Saturday 17 September, Russia accused groups supported by the US to have violated the ceasefire 199 times and said it was up to the US to stop them and thus save the ceasefire.

Later on 17 September, the US-led coalition with Danish, British and Australian aircraft bombarded the Syrian army near ISIL-dominated territory in northern Syria killing between 90 and 106 Syrian Army soldiers and wounding 110 more, which for the Syrian government proved that "the US and its allies cooperate with terrorists". While the US contended the bombs on Assad's troops were by accident, Russia said it was on purpose. 18 September, bombarding also in Aleppo resumed.

Monday 19 September, Assad's government declared the ceasefire as ended, mainly because of the US-led coalition's attacks on Assad's troops. Soon afterward a UN food convoy near Aleppo was bombarded or shot at, unclear was by whom.

On 3 October, the U.S. announced suspension of talks with Russia on implementing the agreement, marking the end of the ceasefire deal.

=== July 2017 U.S.–Russia brokered ceasefire agreement ===
On 9 July 2017, a new ceasefire agreement was brokered directly by the United States and Russia for southwest Syria. Unlike the earlier ceasefire attempts that failed to reduce violence for long, US President Donald Trump and Russian President Vladimir Putin reached agreement during their meeting at the Group of 20 summit in Hamburg, Germany, on 7 July 2017. The ceasefire agreement affects towns, villages and borderlands in three regions close to Jordan and Israel. The deal includes establishing de-escalation zones, otherwise known as safe zones, along Syria's borders with both Jordan and Israel.

== See also ==
- Geneva II Middle East peace conference
- List of Middle East peace proposals
