= Arab League monitors in Syria =

On December 19, 2011, the Syrian government agreed to allow foreign observers from the Arab League to monitor Syria's progress in removing troops from protest areas, free political prisoners, and negotiate with dissidents. The mission was in accordance with the Arab League peace plan aimed to resolve the Syrian crisis. The monitors were dispatched and supported by the Arab League.

== Timeline ==
=== 26 December 2011 ===
67 Arab League monitors arrive in Syria.

=== 22 January 2012 ===
Saudi Arabia withdraws from the Syrian observers mission.

=== 24 January 2012 ===
The Arab States of the Persian Gulf announce that they are withdrawing from the Arab League's observer mission in Syria.

=== 28 January 2012 ===
The Arab League suspends the monitoring mission due to "the critical deterioration of the situation".

== Mission ==
Their mission was to ensure the government of Syria complies with the terms of the agreement. The Arab League's mission is non-interventionist, their only duty is to observe and report back to the secretary general.

== Suspension ==
The Arab Foreign Ministers met in Cairo and agreed to form a unity government to lead Syria to parliamentary and presidential elections. President Bashar al-Assad would have had the duty to appoint a deputy president.

On January 28, the Arab League announced an indefinite suspension of its mission, citing "a harsh new government crackdown made it too dangerous to proceed and was resulting in the deaths of innocent people across the country". Nabil al-Arabi, head of the Arab League, said that following discussions with Arab foreign ministers the league decided to suspend all monitoring activity in Syria.

== Reaction ==
- Syrian opposition movements condemned the monitors and described the mission as a "farce", pointing to the continuation of violence against protesters in spite of the monitor's presence.
- (Ba'athist Syria) Syria questioned the credibility of the mission, challenging the leadership of Sudanese general Mohamed Ahmed Mustafa al-Dabi. After the massacre of Homs, Syria has argued that al-Dabi is unfit to lead the mission as he held key positions in Omar al-Bashi's regime.
- Saudi Arabia decided to pull out its monitors from Syria on January 22. "My country will withdraw its monitors because the Syrian government did not execute any of the elements of the Arab resolution plan", Prince Saud al-Faisal told Arab foreign ministers meeting in Cairo.
- Arab League A mission official, on condition of anonymity, has said the operation would be extended and the number of observers almost doubled to 300. Arab League chief Nabil al-Arabi was at the Cairo talks and due to chair a broader meeting of foreign ministers from the 22-member bloc to decide the future of the mission launched a month ago.
- Qatar has proposed that Arab troops be deployed in Syria, but Damascus ruled out the idea.

== Countries participating in the mission ==
A total of 165 Arab League monitors have participated in the mission. The following countries have been named as participants at some point or another:

- Saudi Arabia (until January 22)
- Qatar (until January 24)
- Egypt
- Sudan
- Bahrain (until January 24)
- UAE (until January 24)
