= Geneva II Conference on Syria =

International peace conference aimed at ending Syrian Civil War

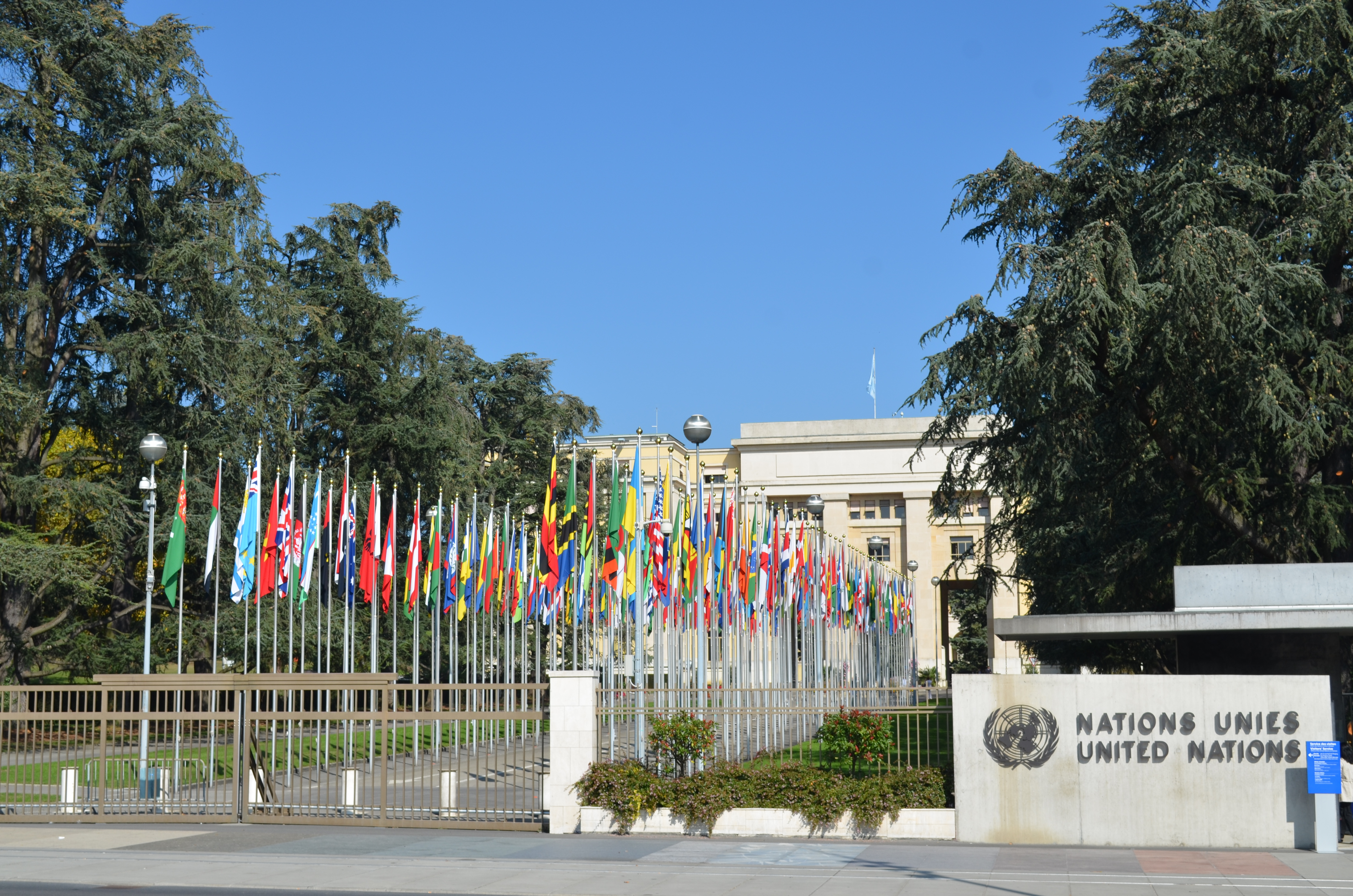
- The Palais des Nations (United Nations Office at Geneva) in October 2010.
- Genre: Peace conference
- Locations: Montreux and Geneva
- Country: Switzerland
- Organizer: United Nations

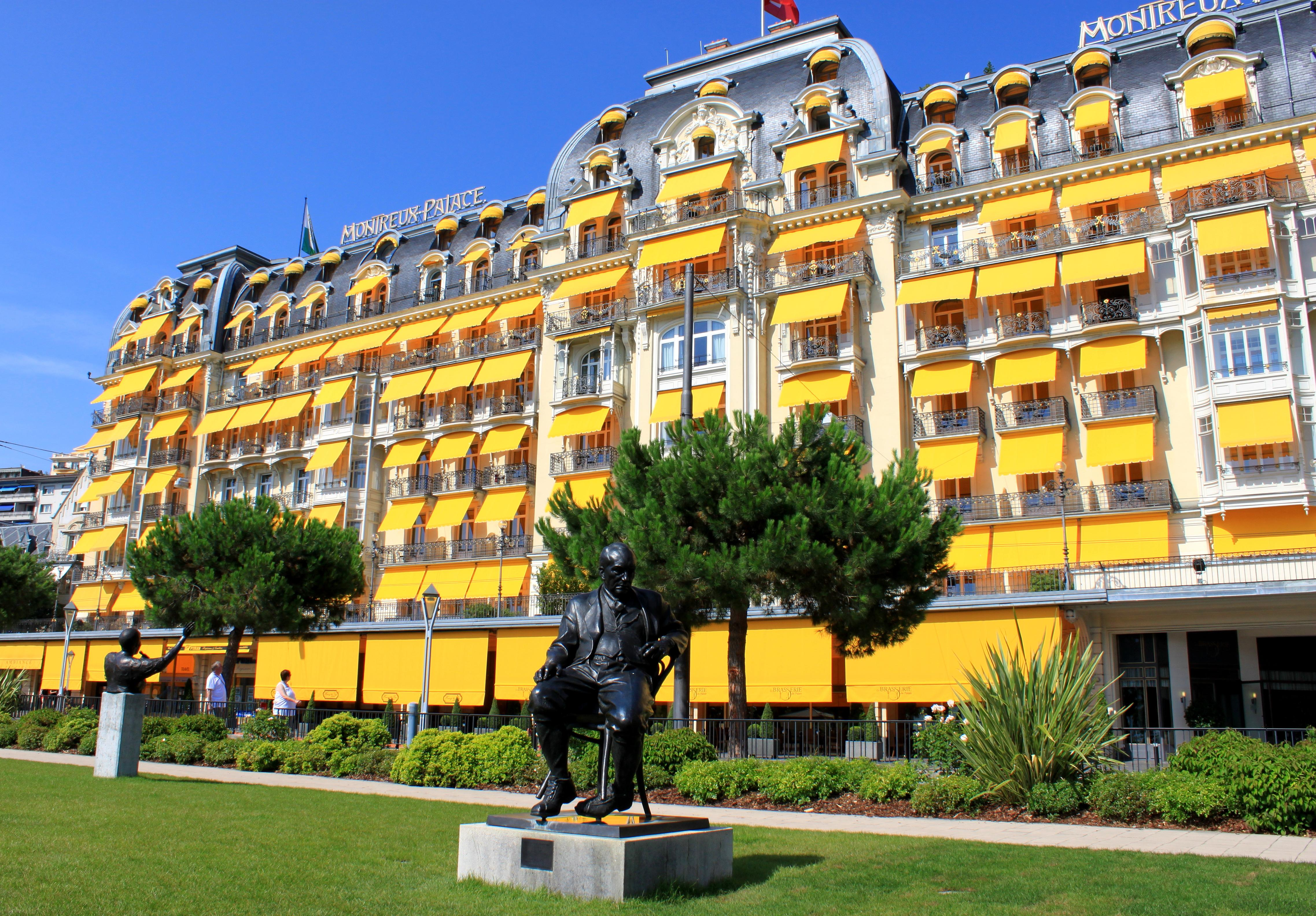
The Montreux Palace. The Geneva II Conference on Syria took place on 22 January 2014 in Montreux and on 23–31 January 2014 in Geneva (Switzerland).

The Geneva II Conference on Syria (also called Geneva II Middle East peace conference or simply Geneva II) was a United Nations-backed international peace conference on the future of Syria with the aim of ending the Syrian Civil War, by bringing together the Syrian government and the Syrian opposition to discuss the clear steps towards a transitional government for Syria with full executive powers. The conference took place on 22 January 2014 in Montreux, on 23–31 January 2014 in Geneva (Switzerland), and again on 10–15 February 2014.

This conference was pursued by UN peace envoy to Syria Lakhdar Brahimi in cooperation with the United States and Russia. According to the Syrian Observatory for Human Rights, at least 1,870 people died across Syria during the nine days of the conference.

New peace negotiations took place in 2016 in the new Geneva peace talks on Syria (2016).

== Background ==
=== June 2012 Geneva "action group" ===
An "action group" conference (now referred to as Geneva I Conference on Syria) was held on Saturday 30 June 2012, in Geneva, initiated by the then UN peace envoy to Syria Kofi Annan, and attended by US Secretary of State Hillary Clinton, Russian Foreign Minister Lavrov, a representative of China, British Foreign Secretary Hague, and Kofi Annan. Mr Annan, issuing a communiqué, said that the conference agreed on the need for a "transitional government body with full executive powers" which could include members of the present Syrian government and of the opposition. William Hague said that all five permanent members of the UN Security Council – the US, Russia, China, France and the UK – supported Mr Annan's efforts. Clinton however suggested that Syrian president Assad could, in such transitional government, not remain in power, which immediately was contradicted by Lavrov.

The final communiqué states that any political settlement must deliver a transition that:

- Offers a perspective for the future that can be shared by all in Syria.
- Establishes clear steps according to a firm time-table towards the realization of that perspective.
- Can be implemented in a climate of safety for all, stability and calm.
- Is reached rapidly without further bloodshed and violence and is credible.

The key steps in the transition should include:

- Establishment of a transitional governing body with full executive powers that could include members of the government and opposition, and should be formed on the basis of mutual consent.
- Participation of all groups and segments of society in Syria in a meaningful national dialogue process.
- Review of the constitutional order and the legal system.
- Free and fair multi-party elections for the new institutions and offices that have been established.
- Full representation of women in all aspects of the transition.

=== Brahimi Initiative ===
After the June 2012 meeting, Lakhdar Brahimi, who was appointed as the new UN peace envoy to Syria in August 2012, started to prepare an international conference on ending Syria's civil war, in close cooperation with the Russian Federation and the United States. Two Syrian delegations, both the government and opposition, would be brought together at the conference.

In May 2013, US Secretary of State John Kerry and Russian Foreign Minister Sergei Lavrov agreed to try to "bring both sides to the table" to end the bloodshed. Their initiative gained greater impetus after Ghouta chemical attack on the outskirts of Damascus killed hundreds of people, on 21 August 2013.

== Aims ==
The objectives of the Geneva II conference are to bring one delegation representing the Syrian Ba'athist government and one representing the Syrian opposition together to discuss how to implement the Geneva Communiqué of 30 June 2012 (a "transitional government"), end the war, and start a process toward a New Syrian republic. Attitudes by Syrian groups and by the US and Russia towards the role of President Bashar al-Assad in a transitional period differ and are expected by The Economist magazine to constitute a major issue at the conference.

== Obstacles before 'Geneva II' ==
Brahimi said in August 2013 that the main problem was getting the different groups in Syria and their different international supporters to accept the "very principle of a political solution." He said that this has been the UN approach to the Syrian civil war since the war began. Brahimi said that his

main message to the Syrian parties ... [is] that there is no military solution to this devastating conflict. Only a political solution will put an end to it. And the basis for such a solution does exist. It is the Communiqué issued on 30 June 2012, after the meeting, in Geneva, of the so called 'Action Group' of countries convened at the initiative of Kofi Annan.

The Syrian government said on 3 November 2013, that the comments of US Secretary of State John Kerry could cause the peace talks to fail, because they are "an aggression against the Syrian people's right to decide their future."

== Participants ==
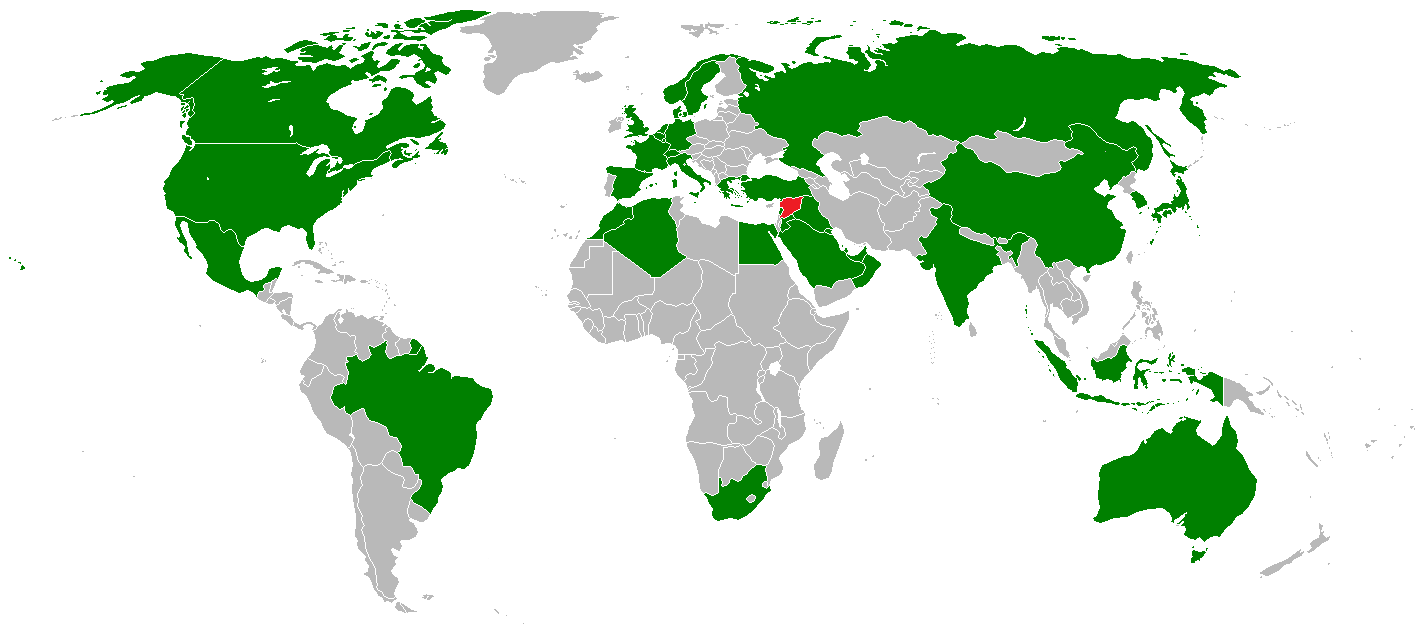
Map of countries participating in the Geneva II peace conference shown in green and Syria in red.

The list of the participant countries of the Geneva II Conference on Syria was determined on 20 December 2013.

International organizations

- United Nations
- European Union
- Arab League
- Organisation of Islamic Cooperation

States and subjects of public international law

- Algeria
- Australia
- Bahrain
- Belgium
- Brazil
- Canada
- China
- Denmark
- Egypt
- France
- Germany
- Greece
- India
- Indonesia
- Iraq
- Italy
- Japan
- Jordan
- Kuwait
- Lebanon
- Luxembourg
- Mexico
- Morocco
- Norway
- Netherlands
- Oman
- Qatar
- Russia
- Saudi Arabia
- South Africa
- South Korea
- Spain
- Sudan
- Sweden
- Switzerland
- Turkey
- United Arab Emirates
- United Kingdom
- United States
- Vatican City

=== Syrian participation ===
On 22 July 2013 Russian Foreign Minister Sergey Lavrov said that the Syrian government was ready to engage in the conference without preconditions. On 25 November 2013, UN Secretary-General Ban Ki-moon announced that on the planned conference on 22 January 2014, members of the Syrian government and of the opposition will be present.

Following the publication of the list of participants on 20 December 2013. Hassan Abboud, the leader of Ahrar ash-Sham, has said that it not be bound by the outcome of the talks. The Islamic Front has rejected the talks. The Syrian National Council has withdrawn from the Syrian National Coalition in protest at the decision of the coalition to attend the talks. The Syria Revolutionaries Front and the Ajnad al-Sham Islamic Union have supported the talks and want to be represented at the conference. On 20 December 2013, the Kurdish Democratic Union Party requested a delegation to the conference, citing the fact that Kurdish forces had created a semi-Autonomous state in northern Syria but were not invited. The opposition delegation is headed by Hadi al-Bahra.

=== Iranian participation ===
In May 2013, Iranian Ambassador to the UN Mohammad Khazaee said that Iran would decide on its participation in the conference, depending "on the details that we will consider when we receive them." On 19 January 2014, the Syrian National Coalition threatened to leave the talks after a last minute (by measure of days) invitation to the Iranian government by the UN Secretary-General Ban Ki-moon to participate in the conference in Montreux, 22 January. The United States viewed the invitation to Iran to attend the Geneva II conference as conditioned on Iran's explicit and public support for the full implementation of the Geneva I communiqué. Following nearly 24 hours of confusion Ban Ki-moon rescinded the invitation to Iran; the Syrian National Coalition announced that it would attend the conference shortly afterwards.

== Proposed dates ==
The conference was initially proposed for the end of May 2013, with participation expected by representatives of the Syrian National Coalition, the president Bashar al-Assad government of Syria, the United States and Russia, and coordination by Lakhdar Brahimi, the UN peace envoy for Syria. In late June, the United States postponed the conference.

In mid-August 2013, UN diplomats tentatively proposed mid-October 2013 for the conference date.

On 5 November 2013, Brahimi said that US and Russia could not reach an agreement over the date for the conference, and further deliberation over the pursued conference would take place 25 November 2013. As a November date could not be agreed, Brahimi still hoped to get a meeting before the end of 2013. On 14 November, it was reported the conference may take place beginning 12 December 2013. The report allegedly quoted a message from the US Secretary of State John Kerry to his French counterpart Laurent Fabius. On 25 November 2013, UN Secretary-General Ban Ki-moon announced that the conference would be held on 22 January 2014.

== Preparations ==
In August 2013, Lakhdar Brahimi moved his headquarters from Cairo to Geneva in order to prepare for the conference. Brahimi stated that his office kept "communication channels open" with the al-Assad government through an office in Damascus, with the civilian and armed opposition groups in Syria and in exile, and with "various groups representing civil society, including women, both inside and outside Syria." He said that the UN is encouraging all groups to guarantee the participation of women and other components of "civil society" in the peace and reconstruction process.

In early August 2013, meetings took place in Paris between US Ambassador to Syria Robert Ford and Syrian opposition members to plan for the conference and discuss the chances of reaching a consensual political balance for all involved groups to meet together for negotiations. Elements of a "shared political platform" to be discussed by a pre-Geneva-II meeting of up to 25 members of various opposition groups included a "civil democratic transitional period" that would begin with the conference, preparing drafts of documents with constitutional principles and transitional justice for a transitional period, reorganisation of security and military forces, cooperation rather than competition between opposition groups, post-war reconstruction, media policy, and the balance between difference opposition civilian and military components.

A pre-Geneva-II meeting in The Hague by senior US and Russian diplomats was planned for 28 August 2013 but postponed by the US Department of State because of "ongoing consultations" relating to the 2013 Ghouta chemical weapons attacks. A Department of State representative stated that the US "would work with Russia to reschedule [the] planned meeting and that the alleged chemical weapons attack demonstrated the need for a 'comprehensive and durable political solution'."

== Conference ==
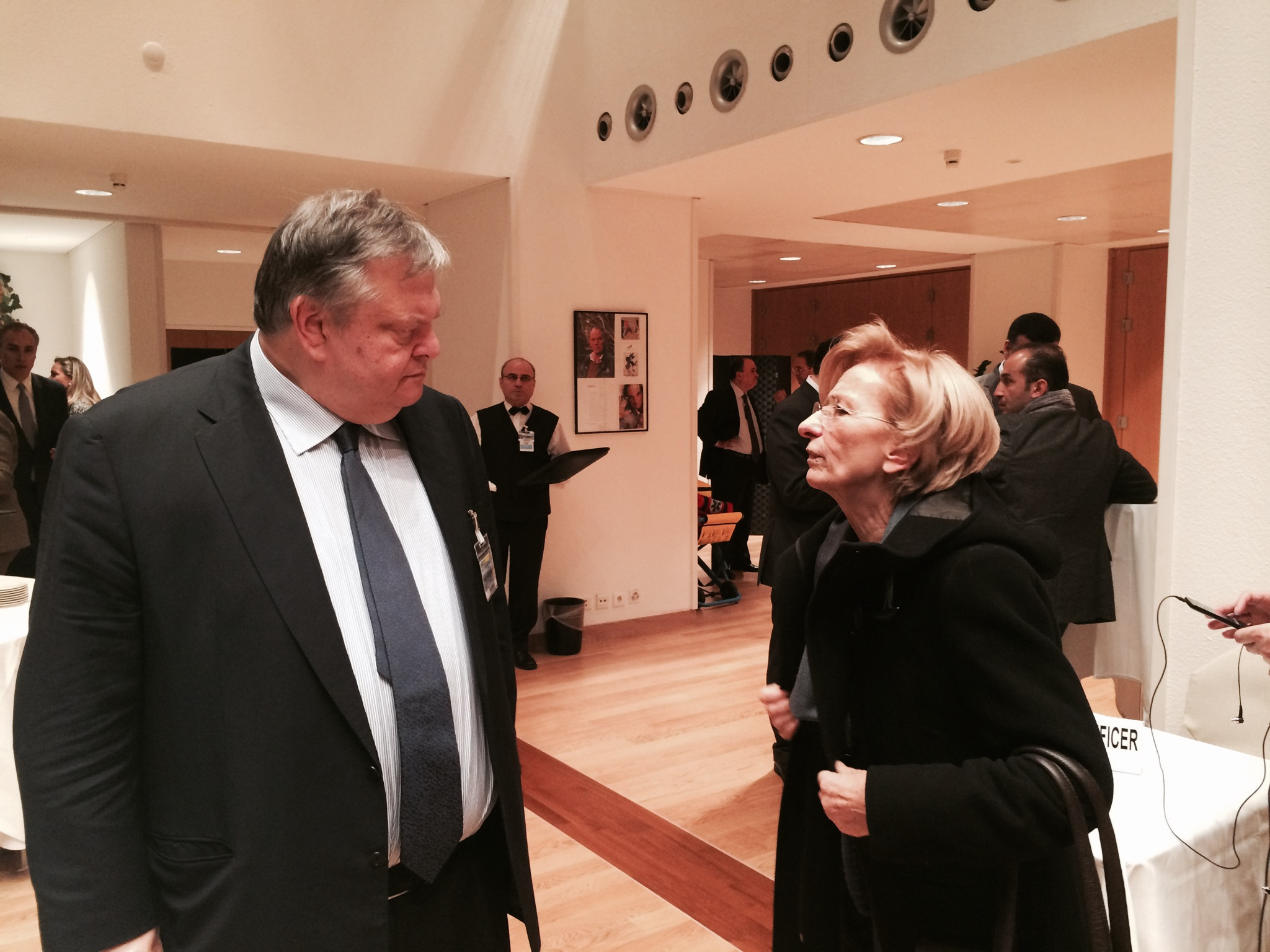
Evangelos Venizelos and Emma Bonino

On 22 January 2014 the conference started in Montreux. Foreign ministers from forty countries made statements. US Secretary of State John Kerry stated the US view that Assad is obliged to step down as part of any transitional Syrian administration: "There is no way, no way possible, that a man who has led a brutal response to his own people can regain legitimacy to govern". Syrian National Coalition leader Ahmed Jarba called on the government to immediately transfer power to a transitional authority. In response to Kerry, the Syrian Foreign Minister Walid Muallem stated:

No-one in the world has the right to confer or withdraw the legitimacy of a president, a constitution or a law, except for the Syrians themselves.

He accused a number of states of supporting terrorism and deliberately attempting to destabilize Syria.

On Friday 24 January 2014, the opposing sides would hold their first face-to-face talks, in the presence of United Nations mediators. It was later said in the talks that Assad's position as president is non-negotiable.

Still later on 24 January, United Nations spokeswoman, Alessandra Velluci, told a news briefing in Geneva, "This process is being shaped at the moment. It has to take time for the preparations. There are no Syrian-Syrian talks at the moment. I cannot tell you anything about what will happen in the next few days."

The first round of talks ended on 31 January. The second round of negotiations took place on 10–15 February 2014, but yielded no tangible results. The two weeklong rounds produced no actual negotiations on resolving a conflict or even what to discuss and how to do so. A third round of negotiations was planned, though no dates were set.

== Reactions ==
Ahmed Jarba, president of the Syrian National Coalition, stated in late July 2013 that he expected the conference to take place, doubted its success in ending the conflict, and hoped for a transitional government to end the civil war. The Syrian National Council which was part of the Syrian National Coalition withdrew from the coalition on 20 January 2014 in protest at the decision of the latter to attend the Geneva talks.

On 22 January, in reaction to the UN Secretary General's withdrawal of the invitation to his country to participate in the conference, Iranian President Hasan Rouhani stated that the "lack of influential players" attending meant that he doubted the ability of Geneva II to solve the crisis.

== See also ==
- Syrian conflict peace proposals
- Geneva Conference (disambiguation)
- 2014 Syrian detainee report
