= Arab League peace plans for Syria =

In September 2011 – January 2012, the Arab League made several attempts to mediate in the Early insurgency phase of the Syrian civil war.

== First attempt ==
The Arab League presented for the first time a plan to resolve the crisis in Syria on 6 September 2011. Its provisions stipulate the holding of multi-candidate presidential elections in 2014, the date of the end of the current president's term. It also calls on the Syrian government to immediately stop acts of violence against civilians and to withdraw military manifestations from the cities. It also demands compensation for those affected, reparation for all forms of harm to citizens, and the release of detainees who did not participate in the violence. The initiative calls for launching a political dialogue between the president and Syrian opposition forces, such as the National Coordination Committee.

== Second attempt ==
On 2 November 2011, the Syrian government agreed to an Arab League peace plan to the effect that its army would no longer be deployed in violent crackdowns against peaceful demonstrators, tanks would be withdrawn from the cities, all political prisoners be released, a dialogue with the opposition begun within two weeks, and Arab League and foreign media allowed to monitor the situation. When on 6 November at least 23 demonstrators were killed, the Arab League considered this a first breach of promise by Syria.

On 12/13 November Syrian opposition groups counted 300 demonstrators and other opponents of the government allegedly killed since 2 November. The Arab League therefore threatened to suspend Syria's membership of the League if it wouldn't execute the peace plan before 16 November.

On 16 November, the Arab League formally suspended Syria's membership of the League.

November additionally saw the Arab League impose economic sanctions on Syria. These sanctions saw asset freezes and travel restrictions on senior regime officials, a ban on Arab funding for development projects in Syria and restrictions in trading with Syria's central bank. Only Iraq and Lebanon refused to enact these sanctions.

== Third attempt ==
19 December 2011, Syria signed another Arab League peace plan that called for withdrawal of the Syrian army and the rebel forces from the streets, the release of political prisoners, admittance of Arab League monitors to Syria, and the start of talks between the government and dissidents.

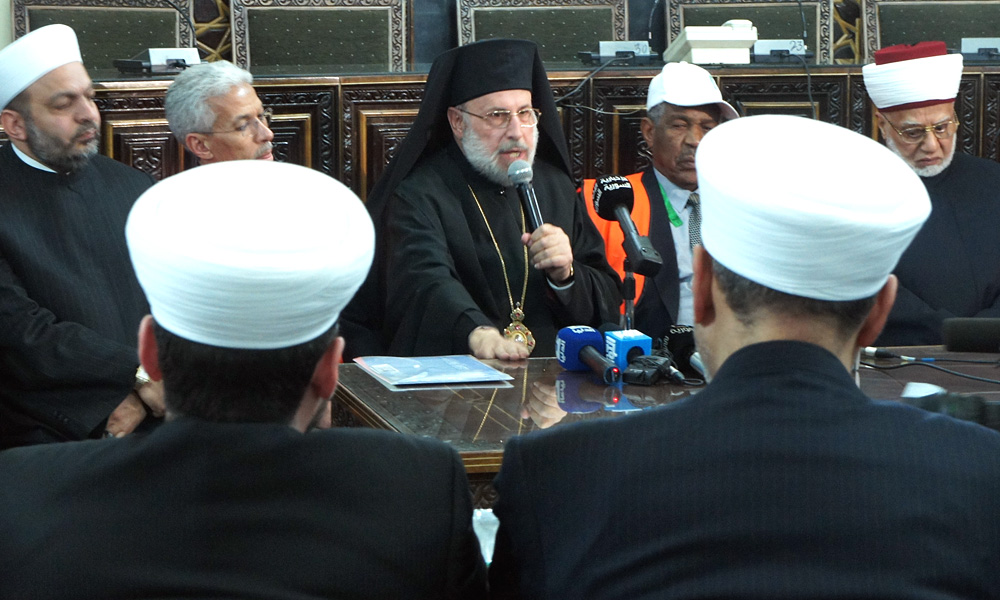
Muslims and Christians at a meeting with Arab League monitors in Damascus on 17 January 2012.

26 December 50 Arab League monitors began arriving in Syria. One of them told already on 26 December to Al Arabiya broadcaster by telephone: "This regime is taking revenge on its people (…) what's happening in Syria is genocide". The following weeks, the Arab League mission was heavily criticized because Damascus did not keep its promises. Critics said, the Arab League monitors' presence imparted legitimacy to the violent actions of the Syrian army.

Around 20–22 January 2012, the Arab League decided to extend the mission, which had technically expired 19 January, for another month, add more members to it, and provide them with more resources. This decision prompted Saudi Arabia on 22 January to pull its monitors from the Arab League mission and call on Russia, China, Europe, the U.S. and the Islamic states for "all possible pressure" on Syria to adhere to the Arab peace plan.

Around 23–24 January, Assad turned down another Arab League plan to stop the bloodshed. The other Gulf states: Kuwait, Qatar, Bahrain, Oman and the United Arab Emirates now concluded that the bloodshed hadn't abated, and therefore the Arab League observer mission was useless, and decided to also withdraw their observers from Syria. On 27 January, the head of the Arab League mission, Mustafa al-Dabi, warned that violence in Syria had intensified considerably in recent days. On 28 January 2012, the Arab League suspended its monitoring mission because of the worsening violence.

== See also ==
- Arab normalization with Syria
- Syrian conflict peace proposals
- International reactions to the Syrian civil war
- International reactions to the Syrian civil war#Arab League
