= Lakhdar Brahimi Syrian peace plan =

Joint UN-Arab League peace mission

The Lakhdar Brahimi peace plan for Syria refers to the joint UN-Arab League peace mission, headed by Lakhdar Brahimi in order to resolve the Syria Crisis. On 17 August 2012, Brahimi was appointed by the United Nations as the new peace envoy to Syria, replacing Kofi Annan, who had previously resigned, following the collapse of his cease fire attempt.

== Background ==
The Kofi Annan peace plan for Syria or the Six-point peace plan for Syria, launched in February 2012, is considered the most serious international attempt to resolve the Syrian civil war in the Middle East diplomatically. The peace plan enforced a cease-fire to take place across Syria since 10 April 2012, though in reality the cease-fire was announced by the Syrian government on 14 April. Nevertheless, by the beginning of May, over 500 people had been killed in hostilities all across Syria since the ceasefire was declared.

Following the Houla massacre and the consequent Free Syrian Army (FSA) ultimatum to the Syrian government, the cease-fire practically collapsed towards the end of May 2012, as the FSA began nationwide offensives against the government troops. On 1 June, the Syrian President Bashar al-Assad vowed to crush the anti-government uprising, after the FSA announced that it was resuming “defensive operations.” Following a prolonging discourse of the peace mission, Kofi Annan resigned on 2 August 2012. On 17 August, Lakhdar Brahimi was appointed the new UN-Arab League peace envoy for Syria.

== Chronology ==
=== Appointment ===
On 17 August 2012, Brahimi was appointed by the United Nations as the new peace envoy to Syria, replacing Kofi Annan. Following initial consultations and meetings of Lakhdar Brahimi with Syrian President Assad, Russian, Chinese, as well as other officials, a cease fire attempt was announced towards late October, in order to respect the Muslim holiday of Eid al-Adha.

=== Eid al-Adha cease fire attempt ===
Brahimi appealed on both the Syrian government and the armed opposition to stop the violence during the Islamic festival of Eid al-Adha, which fell that year probably on 26 October 2012, and 3 or 4 days after it. The government and most opposition groups agreed, but fighting soon resumed when the parties accused each other of continued violence.

=== China visit ===
On 31 October 2012, Brahimi spoke in Beijing with Chinese foreign minister Yang Jiechi about Syria. Afterwards, Yang said he supported a “political transition” in Syria, and supported Brahimi’s mediation efforts.

== See also ==
- Geneva II Conference on Syria
- Syrian conflict peace proposals
- International reactions to the 2011–2012 Syrian uprising
