= Ghazi Kanaan =

Syrian intelligence officer and politician (1942–2005)

- غازي كنعان
- Kanaan in January 2005

Minister of Interior
- In office 4 October 2004 – 12 October 2005
- President: Bashar al-Assad
- Prime Minister: Muhammad Naji al-Otari
- Preceded by: Ali Hammoud
- Succeeded by: Bassam Abdel Majeed

Director of Political Security Directorate
- In office 2002–2004
- President: Bashar al-Assad
- Preceded by: Adnan Badr Hassan
- Succeeded by: Muhammad Mansoura

Head of Military Intelligence in Lebanon
- In office 1982 – December 2002
- President: Hafez al-Assad; Bashar al-Assad
- Preceded by: Position established
- Succeeded by: Rustum Ghazaleh

Personal details
- Born: 1942 Bhamra, Latakia, First Syrian Republic
- Died: 12 October 2005 (aged 62–63) Damascus, Syria
- Party: Ba'ath Party
- Children: 6

Military service
- Allegiance: Ba'athist Syria
- Branch/service: Syrian Arab Army
- Years of service: 1963–2004
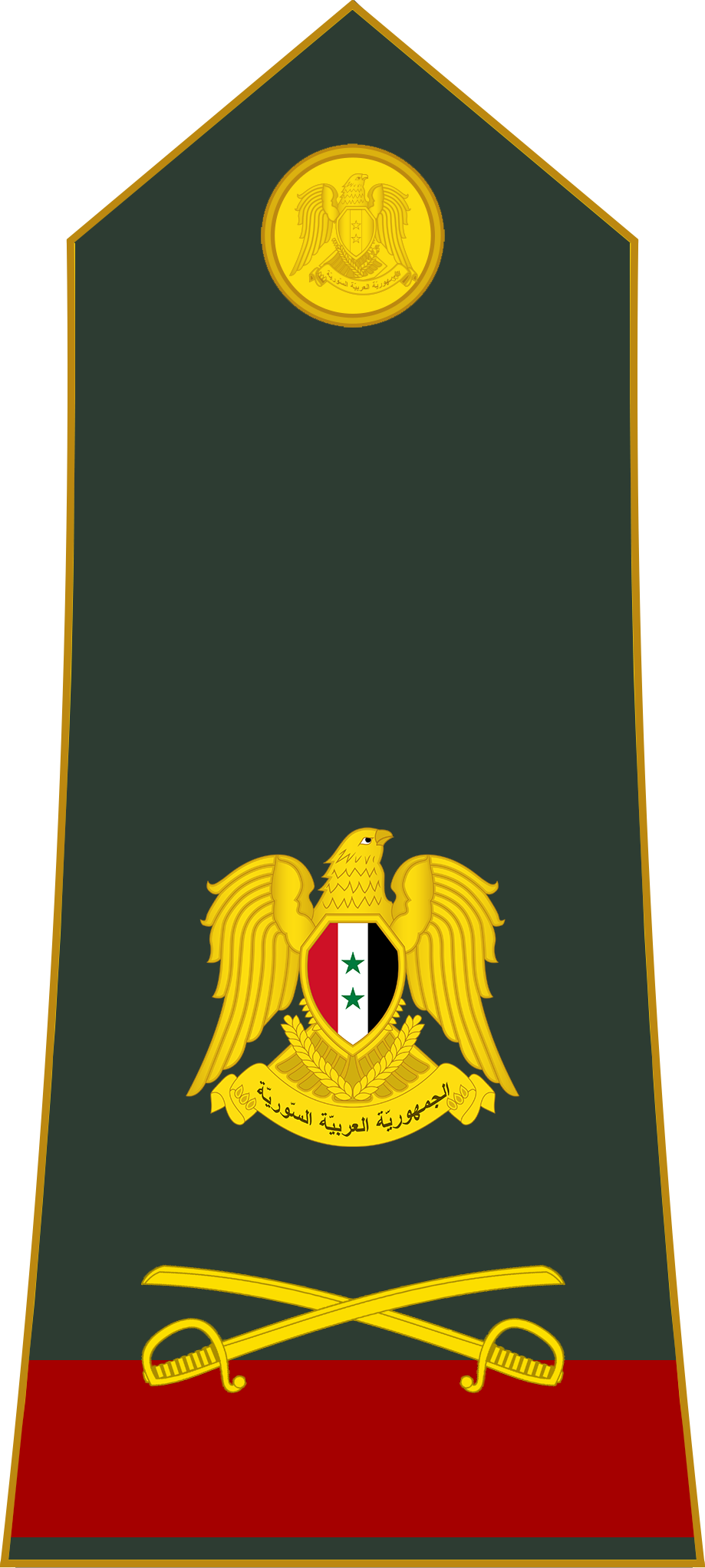
- Rank: Major General
- Battles/wars: Six-Day War; Yom Kippur War; Lebanese Civil War; Syrian intervention; 1982 Lebanon War; Mountain War

Ghazi Kanaan (Arabic: غازي كنعان; 1942 – 12 October 2005; also known by his nickname Abu Yo'roub) was a Syrian military officer and intelligence chief who served as Syria's interior minister from 2004 to 2005. He was also the long-time head of Syria's security apparatus in Lebanon from 1982 to 2002.

Employing tactics such as endorsing pro-Syrian candidates and employing intimidation, Kanaan had a considerable influence over Lebanese politics, ensuring Lebanon was aligned with Syria's agenda. Kanaan was questioned during the investigation into Rafic Hariri's assassination in 2005. His violent death later that year, officially declared a suicide, was met with skepticism by some, drawing international attention.

== Early life and education ==
Ghazi Kanaan was born in 1942 in Bhamra, near Qardaha, the home town of former Syrian president Hafez al-Assad. This region, centered on the coastal town of Latakia, is in heartland of Syria's Alawite minority, of which both men were part. Kanaan was a member of the Kalbiyya tribe and a distant relative of Bashar's mother, Anisa Makhlouf. Kanaan graduated from the Homs Military Academy in 1965.

== Military career ==
Kanaan, as a young military officer, pledged allegiance to Hafez al-Assad, who seized power in 1970. Kanaan participated in the 1973 Yom Kippur War where he fought the Israelis in the Golan Heights. He rose in rank to colonel and served as the director of intelligence in Central Syria (Homs) from 1981 to 1982.

After the 1982 Israeli invasion of Lebanon, parts of which were already under Syrian military occupation, he was assigned to head the Syrian intelligence in Lebanon in that same year. His term lasted for twenty years until 2002. However, Kanaan did not leave Lebanon until a ceremony was held by then Lebanese prime minister Rafic Hariri at the prime ministry on 9 October 2003, and when Hariri symbolically gave him the key of the city of Beirut.

During his tenure in Lebanon, Kanaan gained a decisive Syrian influence over Lebanese affairs, and gradually subdued the warring Lebanese militias through a combination of diplomacy, bribery and force. During the 1980s, he developed collaborators with the predominantly Christian and previously Lebanese Forces – Executive Command (LFEC) militia which was run by Elie Hobeika, but it was only about 2,000 soldiers. He also became a close confidant of Rafic Hariri. After Israel's withdrawal from its occupation of southern Lebanon in 2000, Kanaan extended Syria's influence there, and backed the Hezbollah's takeover of the area.

Syria established an absolute power in Lebanese elections of 1992, 1996 and 2000 through Kanaan. After the Taif agreement in 1989, it was Kanaan who determined fourteen electoral districts of Lebanon. On behalf of Syrian government, he vetoed the anti-Syrian candidates, urged the political leaders to include pro-Syrian candidates in their candidate lists, and balanced the number of religious candidates with secular ones in some districts. In addition, Syria exerted influence on security and judicial appointments in the country through Kanaan. On the other hand, the head of Lebanon's Sureté Générale (General Security Directorate), Jamil Al Sayyed, reported directly to Kanaan, often bypassing the civilian leadership of the Lebanese government. Kannan became the most feared man in the Lebanon during his term, since he had the power to order the arrest and indefinite detention of anyone.

In 2000, the widow and children of Ira Weinstein who was killed in a February 1996 Hamas suicide bombing, filed a lawsuit against him as the head of Syrian military intelligence in Lebanon and then Syrian Defense Minister Mustafa Tlass charging that they were responsible for providing the perpetrators with material resources and training.

After being an early backer of Syrian president Bashar al-Assad as a successor to his father, Kanaan was summoned back to Damascus in October 2002 to become the head of Syria's political security directorate, replacing Adnan Badr Hassan in the post. He was succeeded in Lebanon by Rustum Ghazali, his deputy. In 2004, after a string of bombings targeting leading Hamas members given sanctuary in Syria, claimed by Syria to have been the work of Israeli intelligence, Kanaan was assigned by president al-Assad to the cabinet post of interior minister in October 2004 in a cabinet reshuffle. The cabinet was headed by Muhammad Naji al-Otari. On the internal Syrian political scene, Kanaan was considered close to the president, although at the same time part of the "old guard" of Syrian politics.

On 30 June 2005, the United States, which had been pressuring Syria over the Hariri bombing and to end Syrian occupation, declared that it would freeze all assets belonging to Kanaan and Ghazali, due to their involvement with the occupation of Lebanon, and also due to suspicions of "corrupt activities".

Kanaan was not regarded as a member of Bashar al-Assad's inner circle. He was known to have close links with the former vice president, Abdul Halim Khaddam who had resigned in the summer of 2005. Some believed that they both might have developed a challenging powerbase within the Syrian Regional Branch of the Arab Socialist Ba'ath Party against Bashar al-Assad in future.

=== Business activities ===
Ghazi Kanaan was one of the shareholders of LibanCell, a cellular phone company. The company was awarded a ten-year contract in 1994.

=== 1998 Assassination attempt ===
On 19 June 1998, Georges Dib and Nehme Ziyadeh, two members of the dismantled Lebanese Forces attempted to assassinate Ghazi Kanaan.

== Personal life ==
Kanaan was married and had six children, four sons and two daughters. One of his sons, Yaroob, is married to daughter of Jamil al-Assad.

Kanaan provided financial support to build the Jaafar Tayar mosque, established a library with seven computers and built a community center named for his father, Mohammed Ali in Bhamra. In short, he provided personal funding for community projects in Bhamra and nearby region.

== Death ==
Kanaan was interviewed as a witness in September 2005 by a United Nations team led by Detlev Mehlis probing the assassination of former Lebanese Prime Minister Rafik Hariri. Kanaan however denied any involvement in the assassination. In the phone interview he gave to the Lebanese radio station Voice of Lebanon on the day of his death, he said, "I think this is the last statement I might give."

Syrian interior ministry and other officials reported that Kanaan died in a Damascus hospital of a gunshot wound to the head on 12 October 2005. After a one-day examination, Syrian authorities closed the case, Prosecutor Muhammad al-Luaji stating:

"Examination of the body and fingerprints as well as testimony from employees, including senior aide General Walid Abaza, indicated that it was a suicide by gunshot".

Lebanese journalist Charles Ayoub stated in an interview with Tony Khalife on 26 October 2021 that Kanaan told him three months before his death that he was going to commit suicide and that he had already prepared his grave in his village. Ayoub added that this was consistent with Kanaan's personality and that it made sense since he was in a feud with Bashar al-Assad who was refusing to talk to him at the time and that Kanaan saw no way out for himself.

It was suggested that he was in fact murdered by the Syrian government, and various theories explaining the possible motives for this have been put forth. For instance, Kanaan's death is seen as a move to cut a key connection to the alleged Syrian participation in the assassination of Rafik Hariri. Lebanese Druze leader Walid Jumblatt, who had been variously allied and hostile to Kanaan during his stay in Lebanon, commented by saying that if Ghazi Kanaan was in fact linked to the Hariri assassination, then he was a "brave man" who "did well, if I may say, by committing suicide". There was another argument: Kanaan was in touch with Abdel Halim Khaddam and Hikmat Shihabi and they were planning a coup against Bashar al-Assad.

It is argued that his death was widely blamed on the al-Assad government among the Alawite community. This belief led to further dissolution of Alawite ‘asabiyya'. At his funeral, mourners shouted, "Why did you kill him?".

In November 2006, Kanaan's brother also committed suicide.

Political offices
Preceded by Ali Hammoud	Interior Minister; 2004–2005	Succeeded by Bassam Abdel Majeed
