= Adana Agreement =

Security agreement made between Turkey and Syria in 1998

- Signed: 20 October 1998
- Location: Adana, Turkey
- Original signatories: Adnan Badr Hassan; Uğur Ziyal
- Parties: Syria; Turkey

The Adana Agreement (pronounced [aˈda.na];Turkish: Adana Mutabakatı; Arabic: اتفاقية أضنة) was an agreement made between Turkey and Ba'athist Syria in 1998 regarding the expulsion of the Kurdistan Workers' Party (PKK) from Syria.

== Background ==
Syria and Turkey had long had a strained relationship, owing to historical Syrian claims on the Hatay Province, water disputes over the flow of the Tigris–Euphrates river system and the two nations' opposite alignments within the context of the Cold War, as Turkey had joined NATO, while Syria grew close to the Soviet Union.

In the 1980s and 1990s, Syria–Turkey relations became even more strained as Syria had permitted both the establishment of Kurdistan Workers' Party (PKK) camps within its territory, as well as allowed its leader, Abdullah Öcalan, to reside within the country. The PKK sought to establish an independent Kurdistan, which included areas held by Turkey and to this end fought in the Kurdish–Turkish conflict against the Turkish government.

Turkish authorities classified the PKK as a terrorist group and undertook a campaign seeking to eliminate it. As part of this campaign, Turkey threatened Syria with a ground invasion, should Syria not expel the group from its territory and hand over Öcalan to Turkish authorities. The United States issued a parallel demand to Syria, in support of its Turkish ally.

Syria initially rejected Turkish demands, but after considerable negotiations decided to partially agree to the end of the PKK's presence in Syria. In the runup to the agreement, the Syrian government made Öcalan leave the country, rather than hand him over to Turkish authorities, as per Turkish demands. Instead, he was placed on a plane travelling to Moscow.

== The agreement ==
The Adana Agreement was concluded between Turkey and Syria on 20 October 1998 in the Turkish city of Adana.

Syrian President Bashar al-Assad rejected the notion that the agreement was signed under pressure, stating that he had agreed to it as he had decided it would be best for Syria "to be friends with the Turkish people", which he thought was not reconcilable with Syrian support for Kurdish groups.

== Syrian Civil War ==
The Adana Agreement held until 2011, when overt Turkish support for the Syrian opposition in the context of the Syrian Civil War ended all goodwill between the two countries and the Syrian Government once again started supporting Kurdish groups as a counterweight to Turkish efforts in Syria. The Syrian government declared that Turkey had violated the understanding brought by the agreement by arming rebel groups inside Syria. In 2012 Turkish officials accused the Syrian government of providing direct support to the PKK.

The Syrian government has since declared that it felt no longer bound by the agreement, but retained a "readiness" to return to it, if Turkey were to cease support for the Turkish-backed Free Syrian Army and other rebel armed groups in Syria, as well as withdraw its troops from the Turkish occupied areas of northern Syria.

In 2019, the agreement gained new significance due to the contemporary Turkish operations in Syrian territory. The agreement was explicitly mentioned in the Second Northern Syria Buffer Zone deal.
