= Northern Syria Buffer Zone =

Demilitarized zone in Syria

- Syrian-Turkish border, Syria
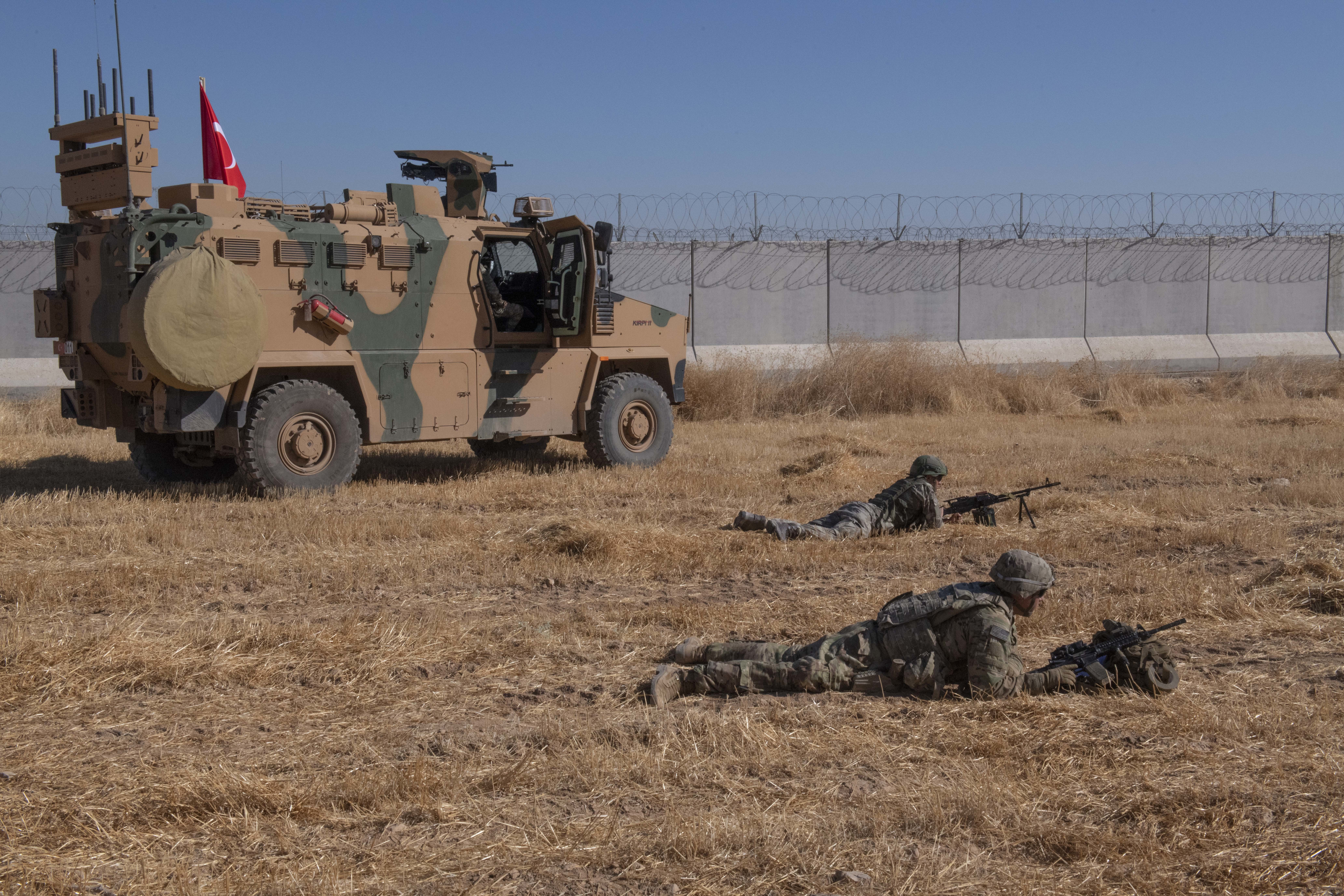
- Turkish and American soldiers provide security for a joint ground patrol in the Northern Syria Buffer Zone, 24 September 2019

Site information
- Type: Demilitarised zone
- Controlled by: Syrian Democratic Forces and SDF Military Councils (during existence)
- Open to the public: No
- Condition: No longer in effect, replaced with Second Northern Syria Buffer Zone

Location
- Length: 115 kilometres (71 mi)

Site history
- Built by: Syrian Democratic Forces; United States; Turkey
- In use: 16 August–9 October 2019
- Events: Syrian civil war

The Northern Syria Buffer Zone (also known as the Safe Zone, Peace Corridor, or Security Mechanism) was a temporary Syrian civil war demilitarized zone (DMZ) established on the Syrian side of the Syria–Turkey border in August 2019 to maintain security along the border and to dissuade a prospective Turkish invasion of the self-proclaimed Autonomous Administration of North and East Syria. The DMZ was administered by the Kurdish-led Syrian Democratic Forces (SDF) and their military councils and enforced by United States Armed Forces and Turkish Armed Forces personnel.

The buffer zone collapsed in early October 2019, before it was fully implemented, when Turkey dismissed the agreement on 1 October and the United States abandoned the effort on 6 October after U.S. President Donald Trump ordered the withdrawal of U.S. forces from northern Syria, allowing for Turkish President Recep Tayyip Erdoğan's planned ground incursion into the region. The subsequent Turkish offensive on 9 October rendered the buffer zone fully obsolete.

The failed Turkish-U.S. arrangement was replaced on 22 October 2019 with the separate Second Northern Syria Buffer Zone, negotiated between Russia, Turkey and the Assad government.

== Background ==
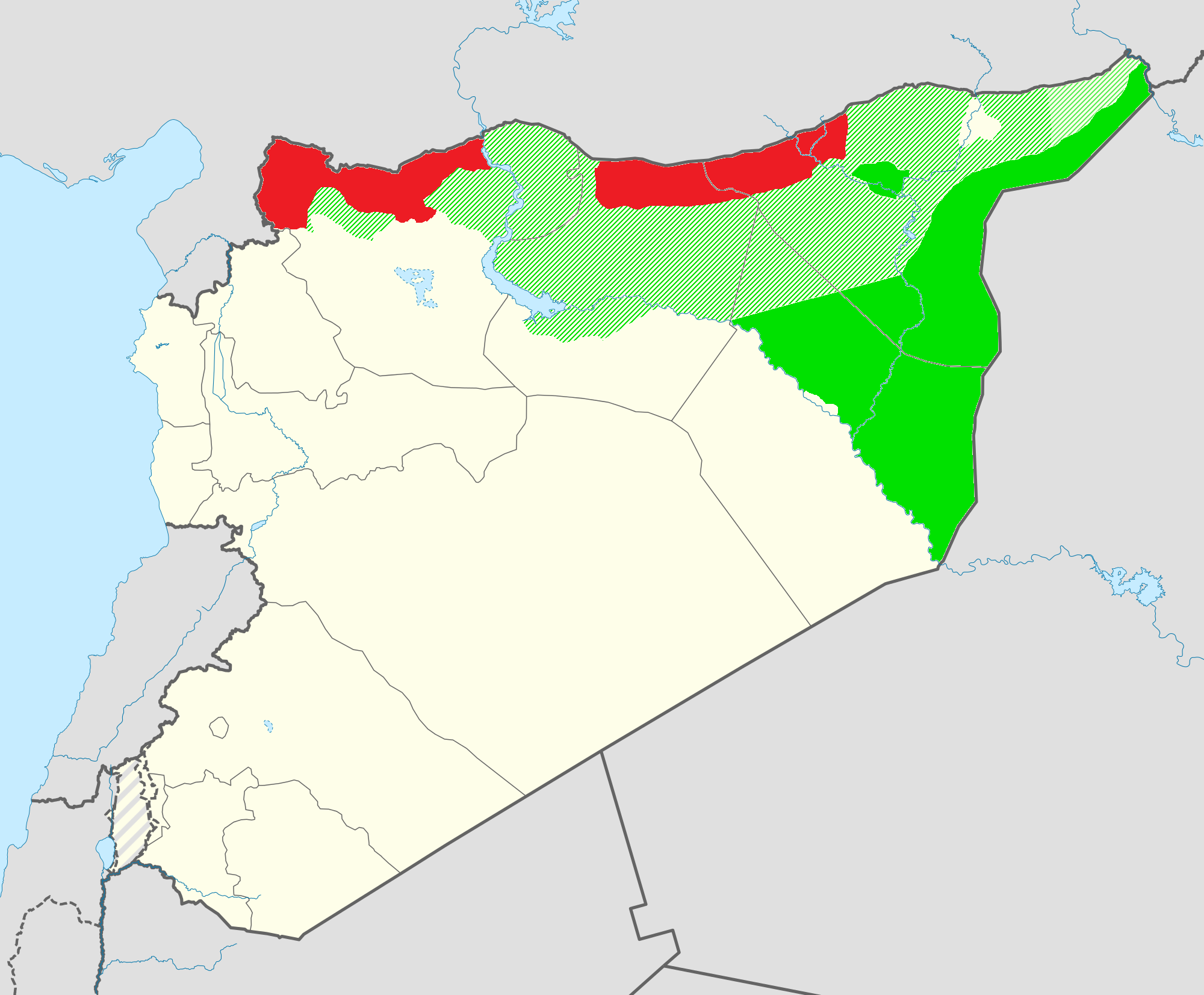
SDF-controlled territory (green) and Turkish-controlled territory (red)

The Syrian Democratic Forces are an armed participant in the Syrian civil war and serve as the armed forces of the Autonomous Administration of North and East Syria. The SDF is composed of numerous groups, most prominent among them being the YPG and YPJ and their political branch, the PYD, which Turkey considers a branch of the Kurdistan Workers' Party (PKK), an organization which Turkey considers a terrorist group and with which it has engaged in armed conflict since the breakdown of peace negotiations in 2015. For this reason, Turkey views the entire SDF as merely an extension of the PKK. This has led Turkey to intervene twice against the group by 2019, first by invading northern Syria to prevent the linking of SDF-held areas and later by launching a full-scale attack against the SDF in Afrin. As a result of these incursions, Turkey established an occupation zone in northern Syria, which became subject to an SDF insurgency. Turkish president Recep Tayyip Erdoğan frequently expressed a desire to forcefully remove the SDF from the Syrian-Turkish border.

The SDF, for its part, became one of the United States' main Syrian partners in the war against the Islamic State, leading to US troops being stationed within SDF-held territories, thus dissuading a Turkish cross-border invasion. At the same time, US President Donald Trump expressed his intention to disengage from the Syrian civil war, initially ordering all US personnel in Syria to be withdrawn before later deciding to maintain a small contingent, at the behest of his military advisors. Nonetheless, the US was keen on maintaining good relations with Turkey, which had by that point already been strained by the refusal of the US to extradite Turkish dissident Fethullah Gülen (whom Turkey accused of masterminding the failed 2016 coup d'état) and the Turkish purchase of S-400 missile systems from Russia, as Turkey is considered NATO's key member in the Middle East.

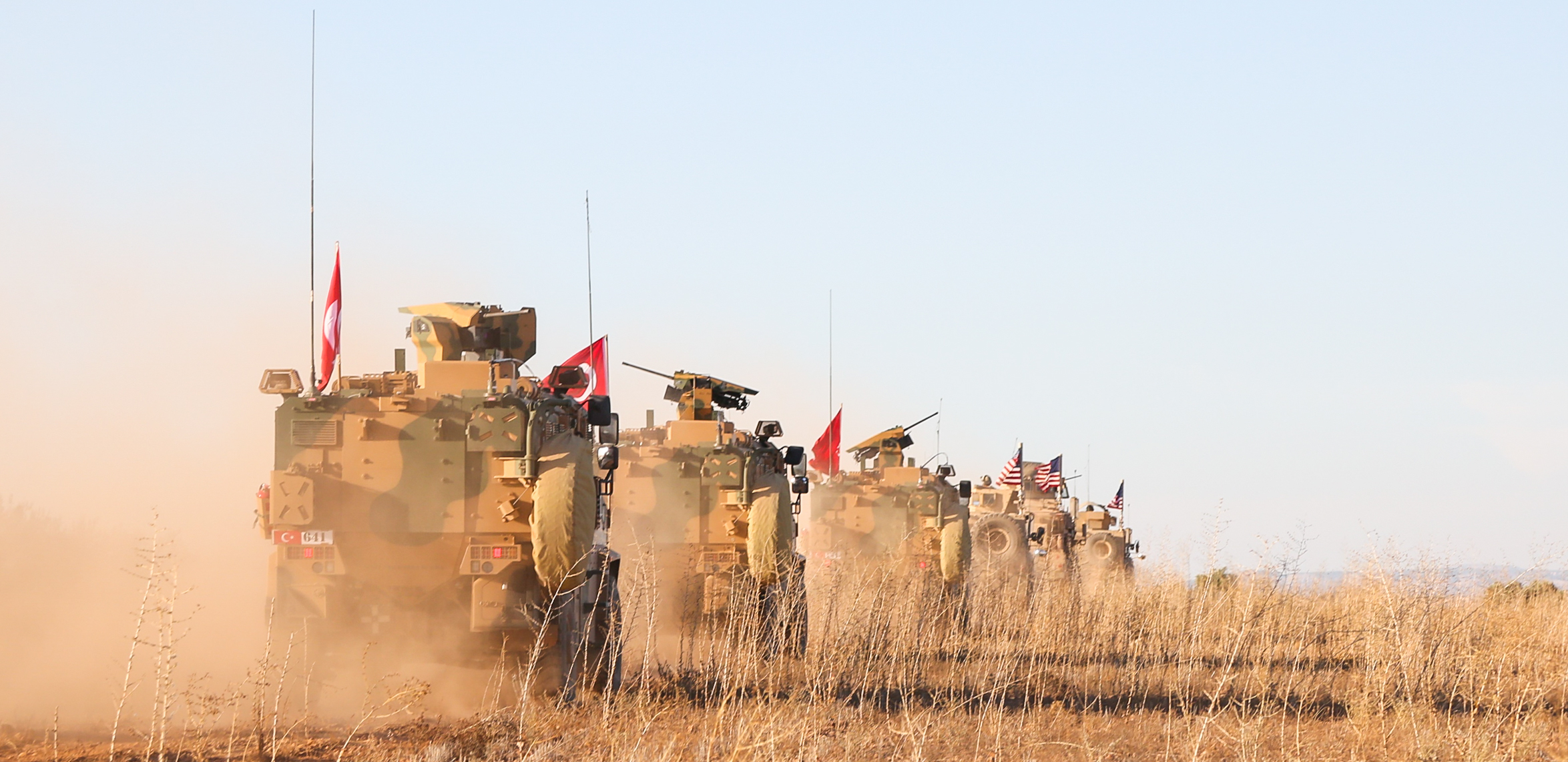
US and Turkish forces conduct a joint patrol outside Manbij on 1 November 2018 as part of the 'Manbij Roadmap'. The roadmap was never fully implemented and joint patrols ceased shortly thereafter.

The US and Turkey had previously clashed diplomatically over the issue of the SDF-held city of Manbij, with Turkey wanting to purge the city of the YPG units stationed there. The result was a 'Manbij Roadmap' being agreed to by Turkey and the US, which would eventually entail a YPG withdrawal from the city. The roadmap, however, was never implemented and the YPG never withdrew. Turkey accused the US of dragging its feet and sabotaging the implementation of the roadmap, vowing to never enter into a similar deal in the future.

Relations between Turkey and the SDF became increasingly hostile in mid-2019, with the SDF joining forces with Bashar al-Assad's government forces to repel a Turkish-opposition military operation near Tell Rifaat.

== Negotiation process ==
=== Preliminary negotiations and initial failure ===
During summer of 2019, Turkish president Recep Tayyip Erdoğan announced that Turkey could "no longer wait" and would not tolerate continued SDF presence along the Turkish-Syrian border. He stated that if the US did not agree to a deal that would remove the SDF from those areas, Turkey would unilaterally launch a full-scale invasion against SDF-held territories east of the Euphrates river, establishing a Turkish-occupied "security zone" along the border – something that US leadership viewed as "unacceptable". With the Turkish army massing along the border, the Trump administration decided to enter into negotiations with Turkey over establishing a "safe zone", which would fundamentally address the SDF presence in Northern Syria. The two sides initially failed to make any headway, with the US initially offering a 10–15 kilometres (6.2–9.3 mi)-deep zone under joint US-Turkish control, while Turkey demanded a 30–50 kilometres (19–31 mi)-deep zone under sole Turkish control.

=== Deal reached ===
On 7 August 2019, Turkey said it reached a framework deal with the United States that would prevent a unilateral Turkish invasion of northern Syria. The initial first steps reportedly included the creation of a "joint operations centre", which would coordinate the establishment of a "peace corridor" along the Syrian side of the Syrian-Turkish border, while still leaving details about the size and scope of the "peace corridor" undefined and ambiguous.

== Terms of the agreement ==
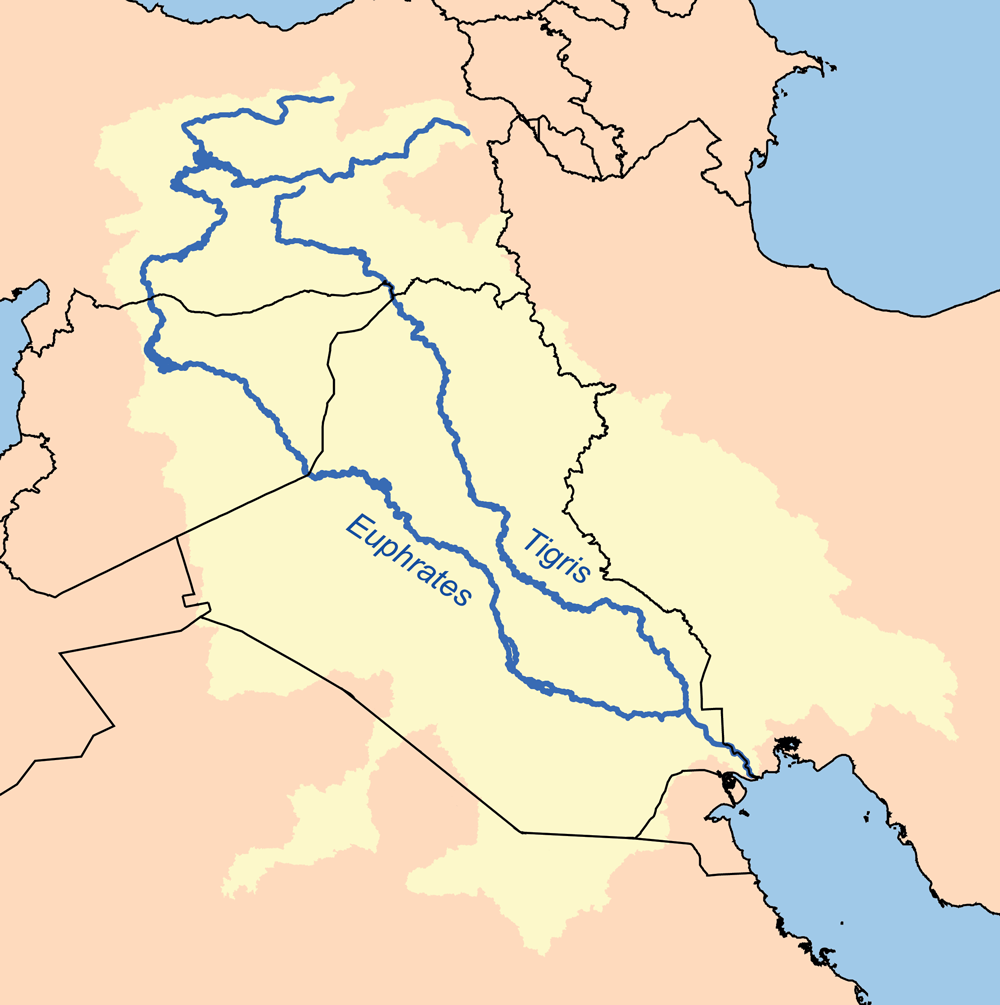
Map of the Tigris and Euphrates rivers, between which the buffer zone was established in northern Syria

In mid-August 2019, the head of the Syrian Democratic Forces revealed that the two sides had agreed on the specifics of the safe zone deal. They were listed as follows:

- A buffer zone (also referred to as "safe zone" or "peace corridor" by some parties) (Note: The SDF objects to the terms "safe zone" and "peace corridor", as they deem the areas they control to already be safe and peaceful. Those two terms are instead often used by the Turkish and US authorities to refer to the zone.) would be established in the areas between the Tigris and Euphrates rivers (notably excluding the Manbij area) in Northern Syria, totaling in about 115 km of the border between the two countries.
- The zone would be 5 kilometres (3.1 mi) deep in most areas, while in a few limited areas would be expanded to 9–14 kilometres (5.6–8.7 mi) (Note: Turkey expressed dissatisfaction with the 9-5-14km model being established and has demanded it to be expanded to 32 km. The United States has ignored the demand, while the SDF has categorically rejected it.) deep. The expanded part of the zone would be located between the towns Serêkanî and Tell Abyad. The 14 km portion of the zone may be extended by 4 kilometres (2.5 mi) in the last stage of the implementation of the deal, reaching 18 kilometres (11 mi) at its deepest point and being designated as a "security belt". Within the "security belt", regular SDF (including YPG and YPJ) units would be allowed to remain in their positions, but would have to withdraw all heavy weapons. No hostile actions or acts of aggression would be permitted within the buffer zone.
- YPG and YPJ forces would withdraw from the 5-9-14 km area of the buffer zone entirely, leaving the areas they withdraw from under the military control of the SDF military councils and the civil control of the Autonomous Administration of North and East Syria (the latter of which represents a confirmation of the status quo).
- Turkish reconnaissance aircraft would be allowed to monitor the zone, but Turkish warplanes would not be allowed to enter and no airstrikes would take place.
- The SDF would dismantle the border fortifications it has constructed along the Syrian-Turkish border.
- The US and Turkey would conduct joint military patrols along the buffer zone, but would not occupy territory. Separate Turkish patrols would not be permitted.
- The joint US-Turkish operations center would oversee the implementation of the deal and coordinate actions between the two parties.
- Some of the Syrian refugees currently housed in Turkey would start to be relocated to the areas within the zone. (Note: Exactly which persons would be allowed to enter remained a contentious topic, as the SDF insisted that any resettled refugees that previously fought for Jabhat Al-Nusra, ISIL or other designated terrorist groups would have to stand trial. The SDF further insisted that only refugees that previously lived in those areas be allowed to resettle. Turkey, on the other hand, demanded that over 1 million refugees be resettled in the zone. Turkey later increased its demand to 2 to 3 million refugees.)
- Turkey would refrain from any incursions into Northern Syria.
- Turkey would not establish any observation posts in Northern Syria, as it had done in Idlib. All observation posts would have to be built on the territory of the Republic of Turkey.

The SDF later clarified that the majority of the zone would include rural areas and military positions, but not cities and towns.

== Implementation timeline ==
On 14 August 2019, Turkish observation drones began surveillance flights over the buffer zone.

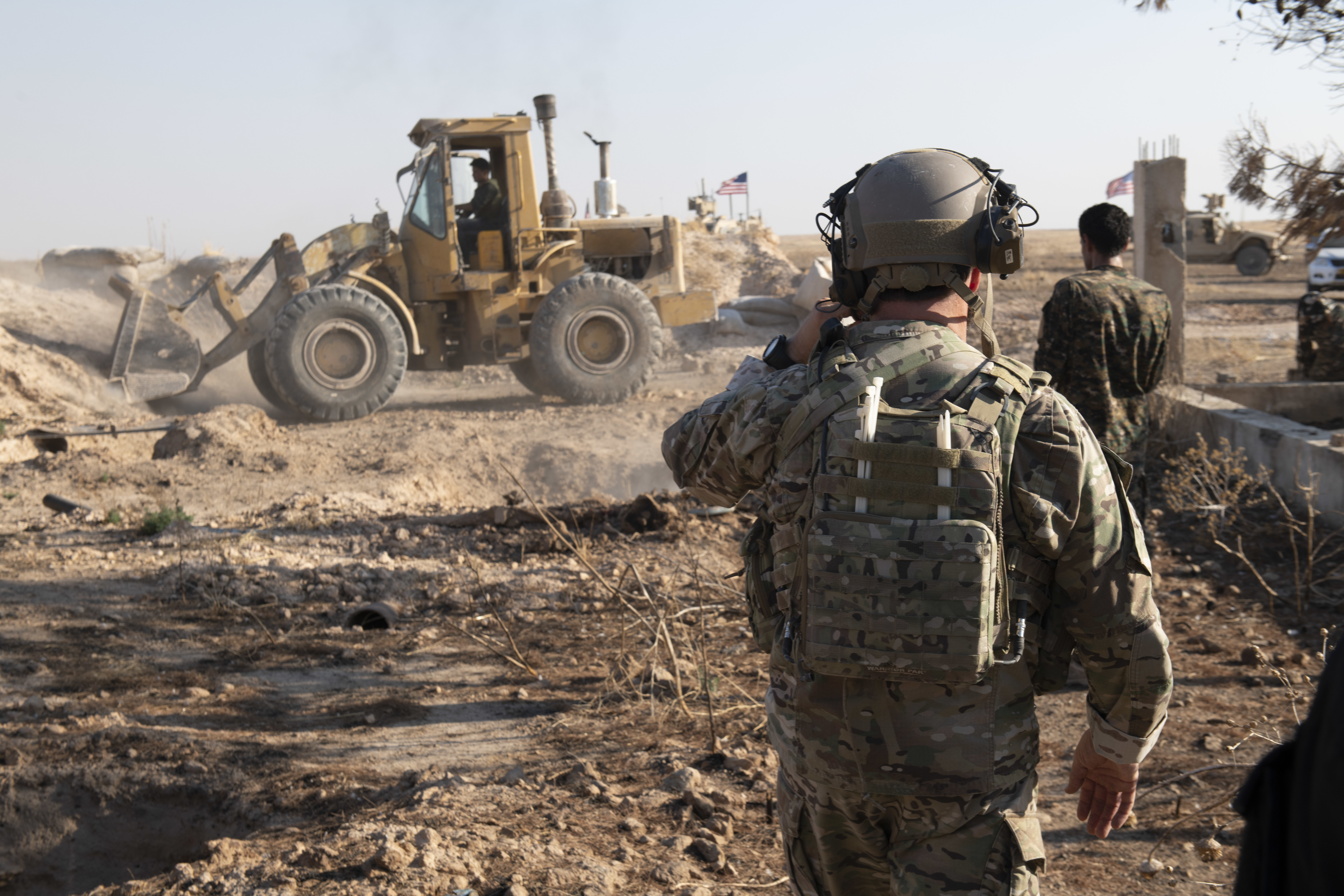
Syrian Democratic Forces dismantle border fortifications in northern Syria under the supervision of U.S. soldiers, 22 August 2019

On 22 August, the SDF began dismantling border fortifications along the Syrian-Turkish border under U.S. supervision.

On 24 August, Turkish defense minister Hulusi Akar reported that the U.S.-Turkish combined joint operations center (CJOC) was fully operational, adding that joint helicopter flights would begin that same day.

- The first joint U.S.-Turkish helicopter flight took place, with two generals, one from the United States Army and one from the Turkish army, flying on the same helicopter.

On 26 August, Turkish president Recep Tayyip Erdoğan stated that joint U.S.-Turkish ground patrols within the zone would begin "soon".

=== Planned SDF withdrawal begins ===
On 27 August, the first stage of the planned Kurdish withdrawal came into effect, with YPG units leaving their positions and withdrawing along with their weapons from Tell Abyad and Ras al-Ayn.

On 31 August, Turkish president Erdoğan threatened that Turkey would "implement its own plans" if Turkish soldiers are not allowed to control the buffer zone in Northern Syria within two or three weeks. (Note: No provision was made in the deal for Turkish control over the buffer zone, nor for standalone Turkish patrols within it, as of the time the Turkish President made this statement. This places the statement in direct contradiction with the previously reported terms of the deal.)

On 4 September, the SDF's Ras al-Ayn military council (composed of local fighters loyal to the SDF) began joint patrols with U.S. personnel around the town, following the withdrawal of regular SDF units from the area a week prior.

- Turkish president Erdogan described the buffer zone as "nothing more than a name". Despite Erdoğan's statement, his spokesman stated that Turkey had already completed its preparations for the implementation of the "U.S.-Turkish joint operational plan".
- An SDF executive council co-chair stated that the buffer zone had gone off to a "good start", but insisted that Turkey must withdraw its troops from the border before "calm could prevail".

On 5 September, U.S. and Turkish helicopters conducted a third round of joint aerial reconnaissance patrols within the buffer zone.

- Turkish president Erdoğan expressed his desire to resettle one million refugees (out of the 3.6 million residing in Turkey at that point) within the buffer zone. He accused the international community, namely the European Union, of not providing help with the refugee burden. He threatened to "open the gates", implying to let all of the refugees freely emigrate, if Turkey did not receive support for its plans in the buffer zone. He then demanded that joint U.S.-Turkish (ground) patrols within the zone begin by the last week of September.

On 6 September, Turkish defense minister Hulusi Akar announced that joint U.S.-Turkish ground patrols within the zone were due to begin on Sunday, 8 September.

=== Joint ground patrols begin ===
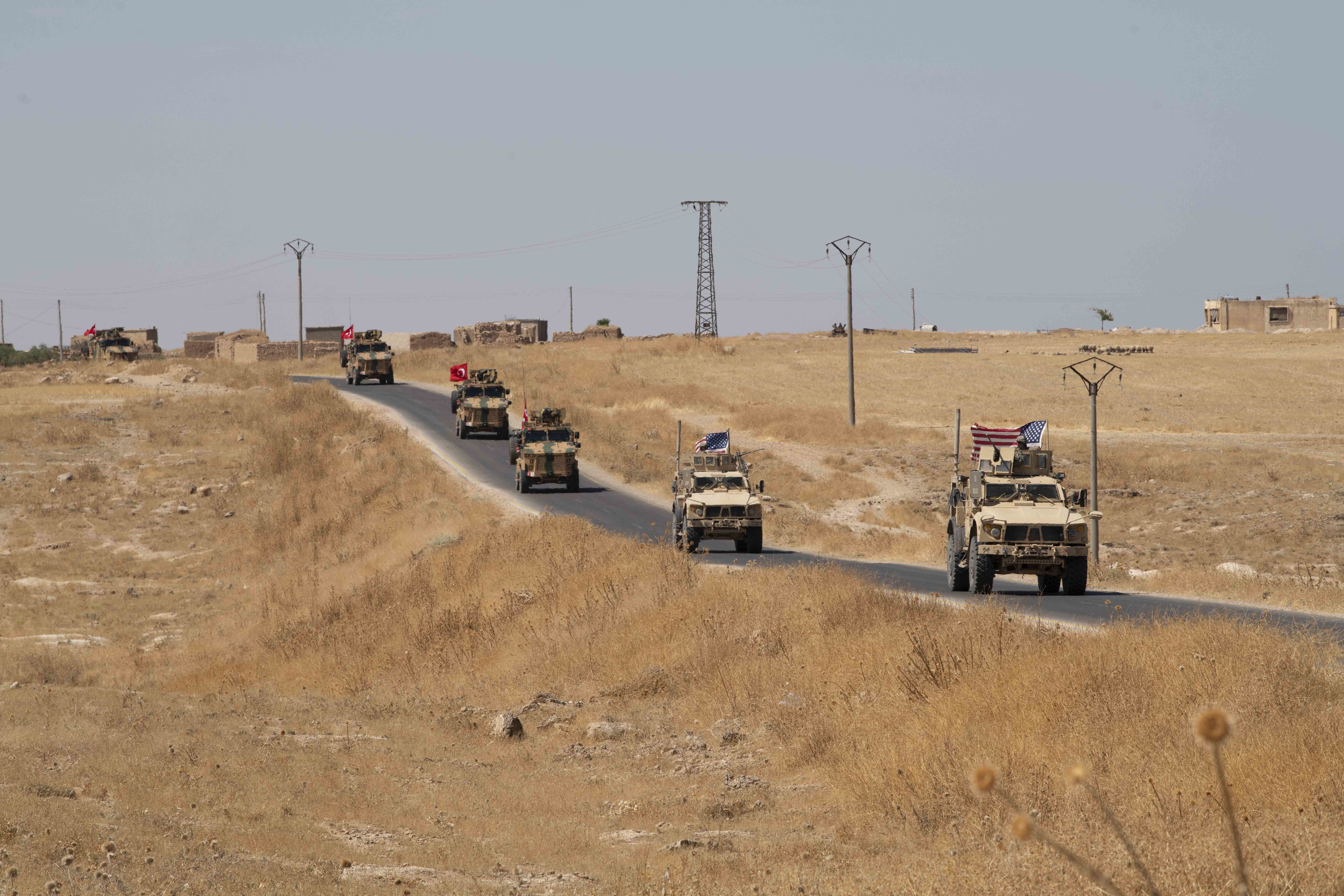
The first U.S.-Turkish joint ground patrol as part of the Northern Syria Buffer Zone agreement

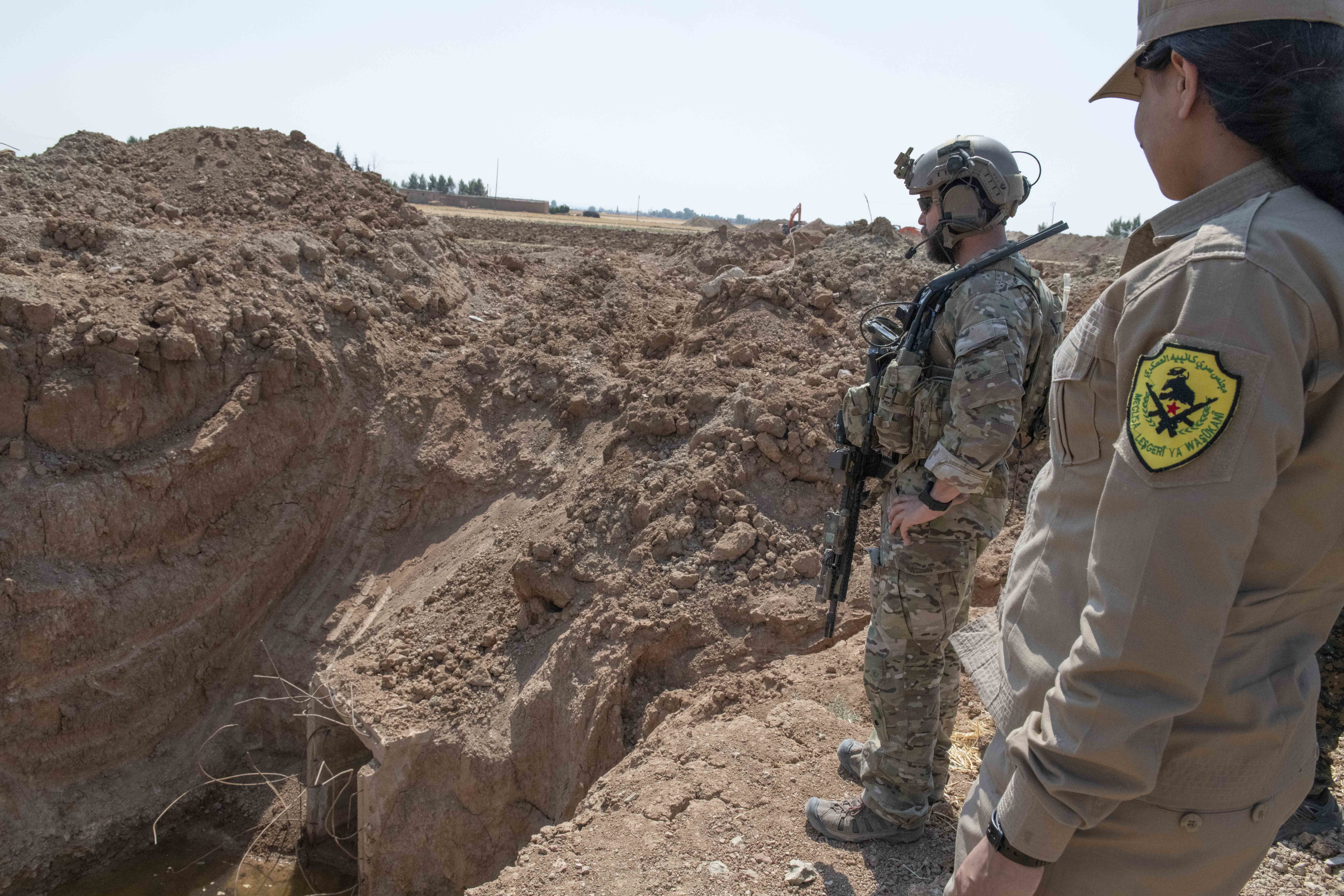
A U.S. soldier and a member of the SDF's Serê Kaniyê Military Council oversee deconstruction of YPG fortifications, 16 September 2019

On 8 September, Turkish and United States Armed Forces personnel conducted their first joint ground patrol starting from the perimeter of Tell Abyad, close to the Turkish town of Akçakale. Six Turkish armored vehicles were involved in the patrol, along with several American armored vehicles, with the U.S. vehicles leading the convoy. The patrol headed to a Kurdish-controlled base to inspect it and to ensure that trenches and sand berms had been removed.

- The Assad government vehemently condemned the initiation of joint patrols, stating that it viewed them as representing a flagrant violation of Syria's national sovereignty and territorial integrity.
- Turkish president Erdoğan expressed dissatisfaction with the buffer zone, accusing the United States of creating the buffer zone for the benefit of the YPG, instead of Turkey.

On 10 September, Turkish Foreign Minister Mevlüt Çavuşoğlu accused the United States of "stalling" the implementation of the zone and reasserted the threat that Turkey would unilaterally invade Northern Syria, if it deemed it necessary. He further demanded that the safe zone be expanded to 32 km, rather than the 5-9-14 model being implemented at that point by the U.S. and SDF.

On 12 September, the U.S. military was reported as considering the proposition of sending about 150 additional troops to Northern Syria in an attempt to "reduce tensions" between the SDF and Turkey. A Pentagon spokesman however stated that the U.S. "posture" in Syria would remain "unchanged".

On 18 September, Turkish president Erdoğan stated Turkey was seeking to settle 2 to 3 million refugees within the border zone (up from one million from his 5 September statement). He reiterated the now-repeated threat to "implement [Turkey's] own plans" if he deemed that "no results [had] come" from the deal in two weeks.

On 19 September, the U.S. military was reported to have continued arming YPG forces, despite repeated Turkish objections. The United States Department of Defense confirmed that it was continuing to supply "tailored" arms and vehicles to the SDF in general, stating that it was providing monthly reports to Turkey as to what arms and vehicles were sent to the group.

On 24 September, U.S. and Turkish troops conducted their second joint ground patrol within the buffer zone.

- Two Turkish Air Force F-16 jets were allowed to peacefully fly over the buffer zone area within the framework of the U.S.-led Operation Inherent Resolve.
- President Erdoğan spoke before the United Nations General Assembly, stating that 3 million Syrian refugees could be resettled within the buffer zone, if it is extended all the way to Raqqa and the Assad government-held city of Deir ez-Zor. He also held up a map, which depicted a 30 kilometres (19 mi) deep "safety corridor" in Northern Syria – reiterating the Turkish demand for an immediate extension of the buffer zone up to 30 km.
  - The SDF denounced Erdoğan's statement, considering his proposed relocation plan for 3 million refugees as an attempt at 'ethnic cleansing'.

=== Turkey dismisses buffer zone, threatens invasion ===
On 1 October, the Turkish-imposed deadline for the fulfillment of Turkish demands expired without satisfaction, casting uncertainty on the future of the Buffer Zone and leaving the region once more under threat of a Turkish incursion.

On 5 October, the Turkish president Erdoğan warned that a full-scale invasion of Northern Syria could start that same or following day, after defining the joint U.S.-Turkish ground and air patrols as "a fairy tale". He further stated that the Turkish military had already prepared for the attack and had received plans for the invasion.

- Rojava officials warned that any such attack could risk the re-emergence of ISIL, as SDF units would have to leave their garrisons in the recently secured former ISIL strongholds in order to resist the invasion. At the same time, SDF officials warned that they would "not hesitate to turn any unprovoked attack by Turkey into an all-out war on the entire border and defend our people".
- United States Secretary of Defense Mark Esper gave an ambiguous statement on the Turkish threat, stating that the United States was "working to make the security mechanism functional".
- Operation Inherent Resolve coalition jets intensively overflew the Syria-Turkish border, while SDF units were reported to have started constructing new trenches and fortifications 40 kilometres (25 mi) south of the border in anticipation of an attack after having previously demolished its own fortifications along the border as part of the Buffer Zone deal. Meanwhile, the SDF military councils along the entire border were placed on alert and began preparing to resist Turkish forces.

=== U.S. forces withdraw, SDF demilitarization ends ===
On 7 October, a White House Office press statement noted that Turkey would be "moving forward with its long-planned operation into northern Syria" and declared that while U.S. forces would not actively support the operation, they would withdraw from the area, essentially allowing it to take place. The statement reportedly suggested that U.S. President Donald Trump approved of the Turkish offensive after Turkish president Erdoğan assured him that Turkey would take over the detention of ISIL prisoners held in SDF captivity. Trump's sudden approval of a Turkish incursion was seen as a reversal of the objectives of the Buffer Zone agreement and was received controversially within the United States. Spokesmen of the SDF said the U.S. move was a "stab in the back" and asserted that the SDF would "defend north-east Syria at all costs".

- Following the announcement of his approval of a Turkish operation, Trump tweeted a threat to Erdogan in which he stated that if Turkey took any action that he deemed "off limits", he would "totally destroy and obliterate" the Turkish economy.
- U.S. Senator Lindsey Graham stated he would "introduce bipartisan sanctions against Turkey if they invade Syria". Graham said he would also "call for their suspension from NATO if they attack Kurdish forces who assisted the US in the destruction of the ISIS Caliphate".
- The SDF sent a large number of reinforcements from Raqqa and northern Deir ez-Zor toward the Syrian-Turkish border, particularly around the areas of Ras al-Ayn and Tell Abyad.
- Several thousand residents of the SDF-held city of Kobanî came out in a demonstration against Turkish threats.

On 8 October, with U.S. forces conducting a withdrawal from the border, SDF officials expressed their intentions to negotiate with Syrian president Bashar al-Assad for a deal that could see the entry of Syrian Army units into SDF-held territories, which they hoped would forestall the planned Turkish invasion. Syria's Foreign Minister urged Kurdish forces to hand over several areas controlled by them to the Syrian Government, stating that should they refuse to do so, they would be faced with "abyss" in the face of Turkey. Masoud Barzani, senior politician in Iraqi Kurdistan Regional Government, urged Russia to intervene in the crisis in order to prevent "further suffering and pain of the Kurdish people in Syria".

=== Turkish offensive begins ===
On 9 October, Turkish president Erdoğan announced that the offensive against the SDF, Operation Peace Spring, had begun.

- The Assad government strongly condemned the Turkish operation, accusing Turkey of "disgracefully" violating international law, as well as Syria's territorial integrity.
- The SDF urged the international community to implement a no-fly zone over Northern Syria, in order to prevent "an imminent humanitarian crisis".

== Analysis ==
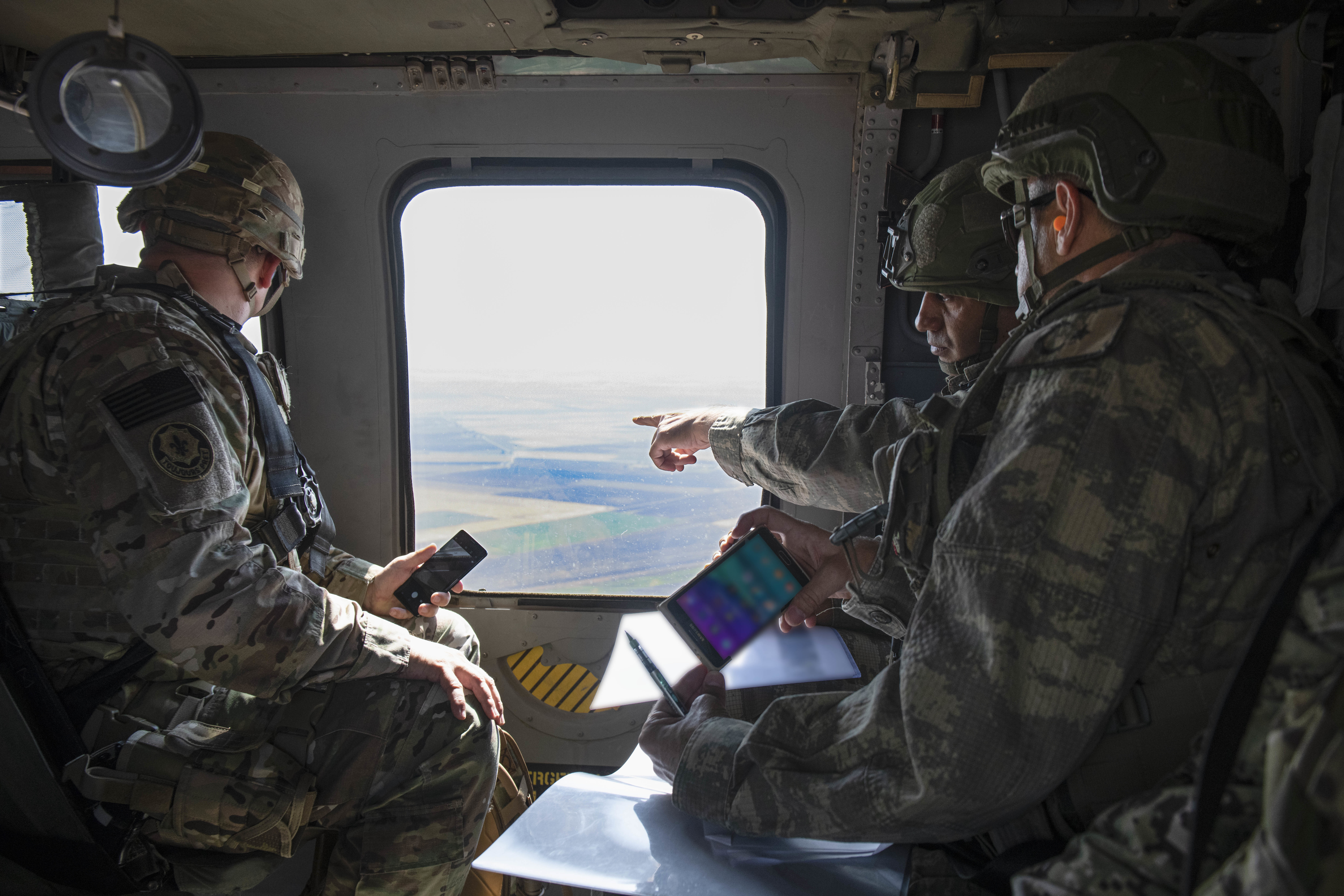
American and Turkish soldiers fly over the DMZ in a Black Hawk helicopter, 16 September 2019

The Kurdish Rudaw Media Network asserted that Turkey did not have a pressing "security concern" for a buffer zone at all, noting that Turkey had managed to successfully prevent any border crossings during the siege of Kobanî without the need for a buffer zone.

The Turkish Ahval agency reported that joint U.S.-Turkish patrols suggested that the United States was "submitting" to Turkish demands and thus providing Turkey an 'entrée' into even more demands.

The Central Asia-Caucasus Institute's Turkey Analyst publication reported that Turkish authorities may have viewed the buffer zone as a way to "move beyond Kobanî" and restart the strained US- Turkey relations at the time, while giving political leverage to U.S. President Donald Trump to continue delaying the implementation of U.S. Congress-mandated sanctions against Turkey, which were voted in due to Turkey purchasing S-400 missile systems from Russia.

The conservative American news outlet Washington Examiner described the establishment of the buffer zone as "appeasement", which it dubbed "a terrible idea". The publication described Turkish intelligence as "deeply flawed and politicised", claimed that members of Turkish President Recep Tayyip Erdoğan's family and even Erdoğan himself might have "supported" both the Islamic State and al-Qaeda and asserted that Turkey's previous incursion into Northern Syria had ended in "anti-Kurdish ethnic cleansing".

The Israeli Jerusalem Post newspaper described the establishment of the buffer zone due to Turkish threats as a "rewriting of international law", which implicitly recognized a "right to invade" and would have great implications for other world conflicts by allowing militarily powerful nations to unilaterally assert themselves over weaker ones.

== Russian-Turkish buffer zone ==
On 22 October, Turkish President Recep Tayyip Erdoğan and Russian President Vladimir Putin met and reached a deal aimed at concluding the Turkish offensive in Northern Syria, based in part on the first buffer zone deal, but with significant changes and excluding the United States.

== Reactions ==
=== National ===
- Ba'athist Syria – The Syrian government strongly condemned and categorically rejected the deal, dubbing it a "blatant attack" on the nation's national sovereignty, as well as a violation of international law. (Note: Neither the Syrian Government, nor its Russian and Iranian allies were included in the negotiations. Their condemnation of the agreement stems primarily from the fact that two foreign nations (namely Turkey and the United States) had negotiated a demilitarized zone entirely within Syrian territory, without any input from the Syrian government or its backers.)
- Turkey – Turkish foreign minister Mevlüt Çavuşoğlu warned that Turkey would not allow the plans for the implementation of the buffer zone to "stall" and cautioned that Turkey would not tolerate a repetition of the unenforced Manbij roadmap. Cavusoglu further pledged to clear the buffer zone of "YPG terrorists". Turkish President Recep Tayyip Erdoğan expressed dissatisfaction with the size, scope and implementation timeline of the deal numerous times and has threatened to void the agreement, as well as allow free refugee migration to Europe, if the deal's terms are not altered and interpreted more in line with Turkey's vision for the zone.
- United States – The US embassy in Turkey released a statement, in which it noted that US and Turkish military delegations had met and agreed to work together to address Turkey's 'security concerns'.
- Russia – Russia warned of what it deemed were efforts to divide northeastern Syria and added that any legitimate agreement would require the approval of the Syrian Government. Russia urged dialogue between the Syrian Government and Rojava as a means to prevent the partition of Syria. However, several weeks later, during a visit by Turkish President Recep Tayyip Erdoğan in Moscow, Russian President Vladimir Putin expressed his support for a buffer zone in principle, stating that Turkey had been shouldering a "huge refugee load" and had "legitimate concerns" over the security of its southern borders. Russian Foreign Minister Sergey Lavrov commented that Russia "always supports" de-escalation agreements, but insisted that all such agreements "respect Syria's sovereignty and territorial integrity as well as the rights of the Arab tribes, traditionally living around the Euphrates."
- Iran – Iran condemned the agreement, considering it a "provocative and worrying step", which it deemed to violate the principles of international law and the Charter of the United Nations.
- Denmark – Shortly before joint US-Turkish ground patrols within the zone were due to begin, Denmark announced that it would be sending Danish army troops and medical personnel to SDF-held areas in Northern Syria, in what the Danish Government dubbed a move assist SDF and 'residual' U.S. forces in their fight against ISIL. The United States Department of Defense welcomed this announcement.

=== Non-state groups and organizations ===
- Syrian Democratic Forces – The SDF announced support for the deal, stating that they were ready to support its implementation and would "strike to ensure the success of efforts towards implementing the understanding ... with the Turkish state". At the same time, the co-chair of the foreign relations department at the Syrian Democratic Council has stated that the SDF would not tolerate any advance of Turkish troops, nor of their allied armed groups.
- Syrian opposition – The Syrian opposition, of which Turkey is one of the largest backers, supported the Turkish position by demanding that the safe zone be expanded to between 30–40 kilometres (19–25 mi). The opposition Syrian Interim Government aspired to one day control the zone, stating that they had three files of 120 pages each, which documented a plan to govern the zone, should they somehow come to occupy it at some point in the future. (Note: No provision is made in the deal for any expansion of the areas governed by the Syrian Interim Government, which at that time had been confined exclusively to the Turkish occupied areas of Syria. The SDF categorically opposes any such expansion and considers the entry of Turkish-backed opposition groups to be a 'red line' in negotiations. The deal explicitly states that the areas of the buffer zone are to remain under the military and civil control of the Rojava government and the SDF military councils.)

== See also ==
- 2019 Turkish offensive into north-eastern Syria
- Idlib demilitarization (2018–2019)
- Syrian peace process
- Turkish involvement in the Syrian civil war
- Turkish occupation of northern Syria
- US intervention in the Syrian civil war
