= Bahamra =

Bahamra بحمرة Bhamrah
- Village
- Location within Syria
- Coordinates: 35°27′54″N 36°1′53″E
- Country: Syria
- Governorate: Latakia
- District: Qardaha
- Subdistrict: Qardaha

Population (2004 census)
  - Total: 1,028
- Time zone: UTC+2 (EET)
  - Summer (DST): UTC+3 (EEST)

Bahamra (Arabic: بحمرة, romanized: Bahāmra; also spelled Bhamrah) is a village in northwestern Syria, administratively part of the Qardaha District of the Latakia Governorate. It is located near Qardaha and 29 kilometers (18 mi) east of Latakia. According to the Syria Central Bureau of Statistics, Bahamra had a population of 1,028 in the 2004 census. The inhabitants of the village are Alawites.

The British Anglican missionary Samuel Lyde based his mission in Syria at Bahamra in 1854–1859. He purchased property, opened a school and put up a number of other buildings there and attempted to proselytize mainly among the Alawites of the region. He did not meet much success in his endeavour and transferred the school to the American Presbyterian missionary R. J. Dobbs, who continued the mission's work. At some point in the 1860s the school was closed, but the Protestant boys' school that had been opened in Latakia was transferred to Bahamra in 1870, where it operated until 1876. Missionary work continued to be carried out from the village at least until 1913.

== Notable people ==
- Ghazi Kanaan, head of Syrian intelligence services in Lebanon in 1982–2002.

== Sources ==
- Balph, James McKinnis (1913). Fifty Years of Mission Work in Syria: A Brief Compend of the Mission Work of the Reformed Presbyterian Church in Northern Syria, Asia Minor, and Cyprus. Pittsburgh: Murdoch, Kerr & Co.
- Winter, Stefan (2016). A History of the 'Alawis: From Medieval Aleppo to the Turkish Republic. Princeton and Oxford: Princeton University Press. ISBN 9780691167787.
- Vloeberghs, Ward (2016). Architecture, Power and Religion in Lebanon: Rafiq Hariri and the Politics of Sacred Space in Beirut. Leiden and Boston: Brill. ISBN 978-90-04-30582-3.
