= Second Northern Syria Buffer Zone =

Military buffer zone between Turkey and Syria (2019–2024)

- Syrian-Turkish border, Syria
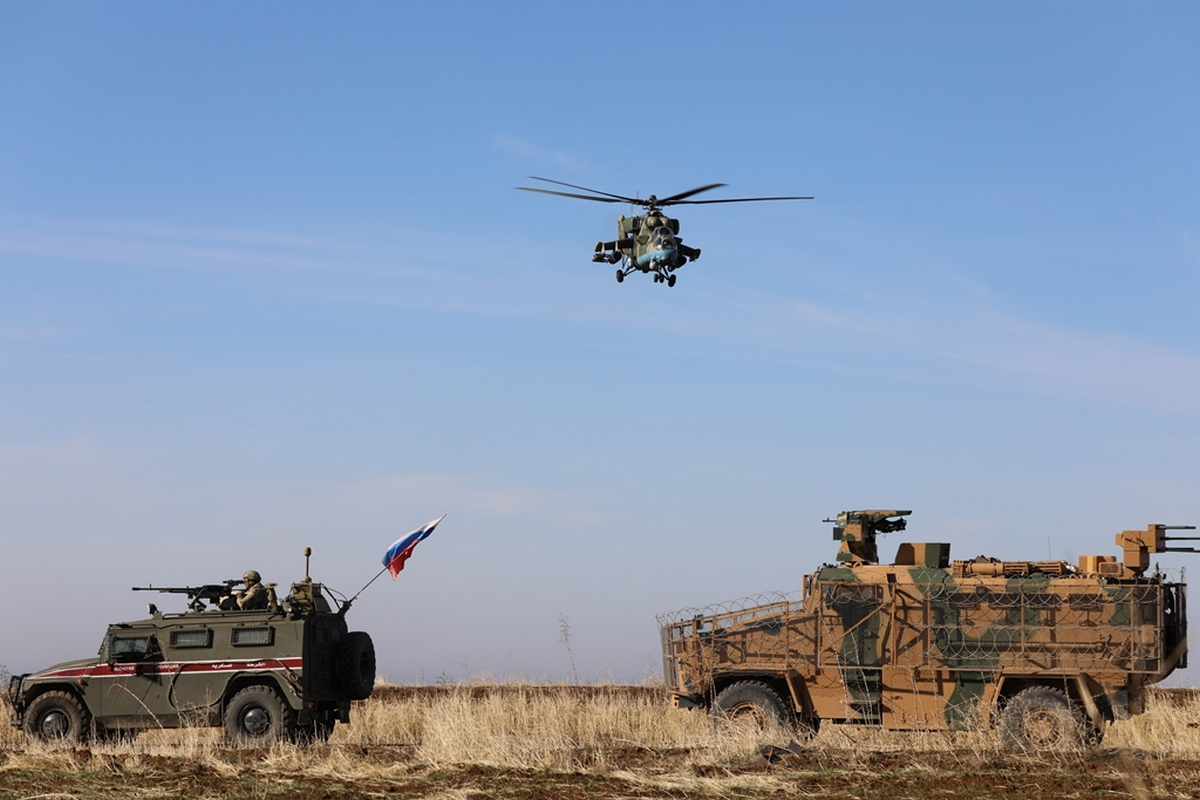
- Joint Russian-Turkish patrol in al-Hasakah, Syria

Site information
- Type: Buffer zone
- Controlled by: Syrian Army and Russian Military Police (All buffer zone areas, excluding those between Tell Abyad and Ras al-Ayn); Turkish Armed Forces (In the buffer zone areas between Tell Abyad and Ras al-Ayn)
- Open to the public: No
- Condition: Inactive

Location
- Length: Sajur River delta to Tall Abyad and Ras al-Ayn to Iraq–Syria border 30km deep excluding Qamishli town

Site history
- Built by: Syria (until 6 December 2024); Russia; Turkey (10km-deep patrols)
- In use: 1 November 2019 – 8 December 2024
- Events: Syrian Civil War

The Second Northern Syria Buffer Zone, part of the Sochi Agreement (Turkish: Soçi Mutabakatı, Russian: Сочинское соглашение), was a buffer zone in northern Syria between the Turkish Armed Forces (TAF) and the Syrian Democratic Forces (SDF). It was set up following a memorandum of understanding in the Russian city of Sochi on 22 October 2019 by the Russian and Turkish presidents during the 2019 Turkish offensive into north-eastern Syria. Most of the zone was controlled by the Syrian Arab Army and Russian Military Police, and some by the TAF.

The buffer zone was rendered obsolete during and after the fall of the Assad regime in December 2024, resulting in the cessation of the joint Russian and Turkish patrols.

== Background ==
Following months of tension and threats, the first agreement to establish the Northern Syria Buffer Zone was reached in mid-August 2019, between the Syrian Democratic Forces (SDF) and the United States on the one hand, and Turkey on the other. The deal aimed to limit the Turkish offensive on Syria's north through a process of gradual withdrawal of SDF, removal of fortifications and joint US-Turkish monitoring and patrols, while still allowing the area to remain under the civil control of the Autonomous Administration of North and East Syria and the military control of the Syrian Democratic Forces military councils as per the first buffer zone agreement. Despite initial progress in its implementation, (Note: As defined by the US and SDF, based on the beginning of the YPG withdrawal, the destruction of border fortrifications and the start of US-Turkish joint patrols in late August. See the implementation timeline for the original Northern Syria Buffer Zone.) Turkey grew more and more dissatisfied with it, issuing more demands which were rejected by the SDF.

In early October that same year, following a phone call between Turkish President Recep Tayyip Erdoğan and US President Donald Trump, Trump announced the withdrawal of US forces from the region, which allowed Erdoğan to dismiss the first buffer zone deal and launch his 2019 offensive into north-eastern Syria against the SDF, which Turkey considers to be an extension of the Kurdistan Workers' Party, an organization designated by Turkey as a terrorist group. Having previously dismantled their fortifications and having their positions observed as part of the first deal, and now stripped of military backing, SDF units reportedly faced a "desperate" challenge in having to defend their territory against both the Turkish Army and the rebel Syrian National Army. Despite initially offering armed resistance, SDF units were nonetheless forced to withdraw, triggering a wave of over 300,000 displaced people, amid Kurdish fears that Turkey would resort to ethnic cleansing against the Kurdish population. Although Turkey's invasion was widely condemned internationally, the SDF stood little chance against the Turkish Army and the SNA. Amid what one SDF commander described as a choice between "compromise and genocide", the SDF turned to the Syrian Government, with which they have had a lukewarm relationship, for help.

The United States negotiated a 5-day ceasefire in Northern Syria on October 17, which required the SDF to withdraw from the border areas, but at the same time allowed the SDF time to negotiate further with Russia and the Syrian government.

Seeking to avoid further expansion of Turkish control within Syria's territory, Bashar al-Assad's government agreed to a deal with the SDF to move the Syrian Army into the border areas. Subsequently, the Syrian Army entered several SDF-held towns and positioned troops on the seam lines between the two sides in a bid to stop the Turkish offensive.

The deal was struck shortly after the entry of Syrian army troops into SDF-held territories.

== Sochi Agreement ==
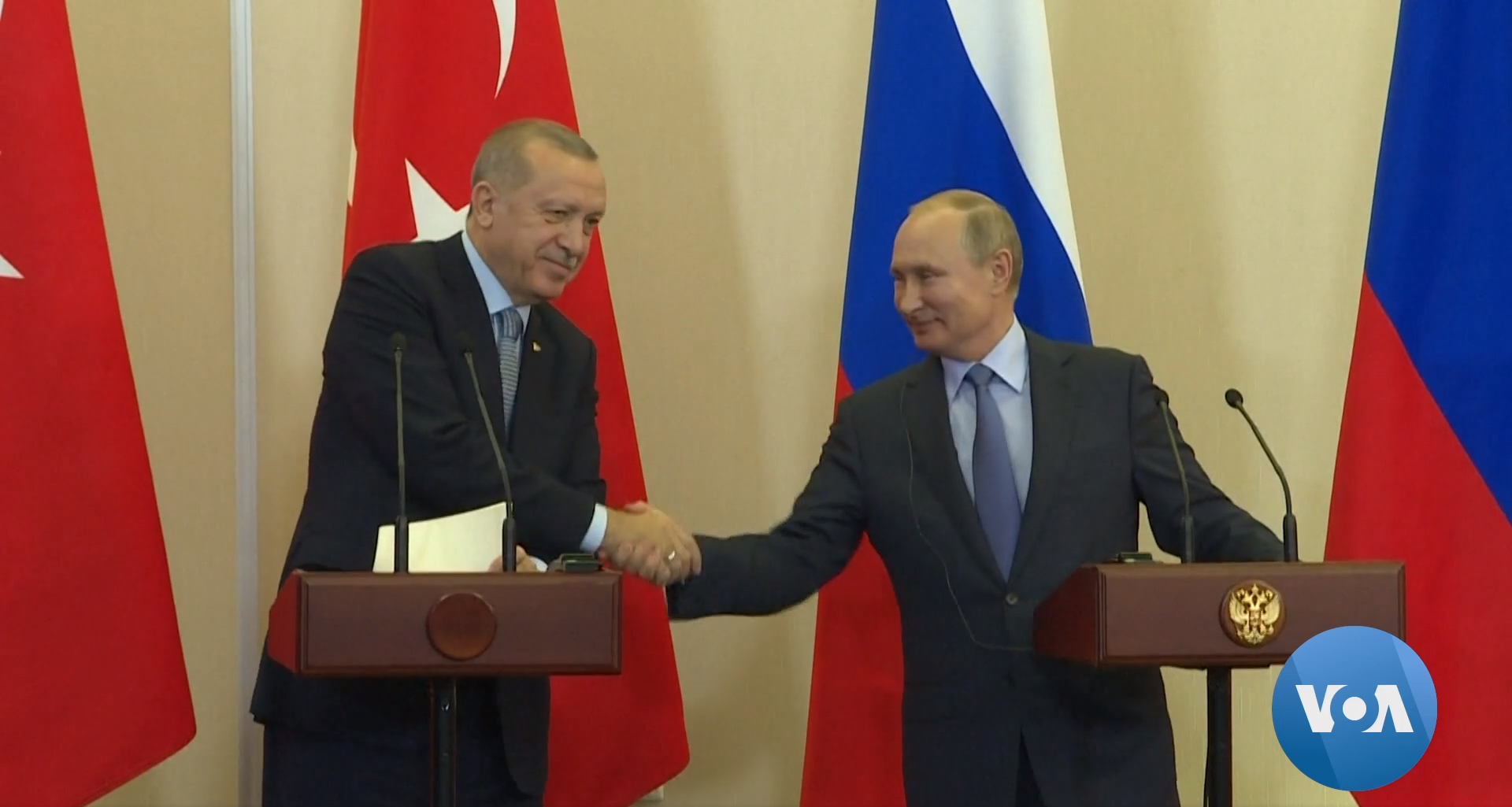
Turkish President Recep Tayyip Erdoğan (left) shakes Russian President Vladimir Putin's (right) hand after the two concluded the agreement

The agreement was negotiated between Russian President Vladimir Putin and Turkish President Recep Tayyip Erdoğan on 22 October 2019, at a diplomatic summit in the Russian resort town of Sochi. The negotiation of the agreement took six and a half hours to conclude.

The Second Northern Syria Buffer Zone was thereby formed as a buffer zone in northern Syria following a memorandum of understanding following talks in the Russian city Sochi on 22 October 2019 by the Russian and Turkish presidents in an attempt to end the ongoing conflict in the region.

=== Terms of the Sochi Agreement ===
The agreement reportedly included the following terms:

- A buffer zone would be established in Northern Syria. The zone would be around 30 kilometres (19 mi) deep, (Note: Starting from the Syrian-Turkish border and going south into Syria.) stretching from Euphrates River to Tall Abyad and from Ras al-Ayn to the Iraq-Syria border, but excluding the town of Qamishli, the Kurds' de facto capital. (Note: See the "External links" section, for a link to an article containing an explanatory map of the buffer zone.)
- The buffer zone would be controlled jointly by the Syrian Army and Russian Military Police.
- All YPG forces, which constitute the majority of the SDF, must withdraw from the buffer zone entirely, along with their weapons, within 150 hours from the announcement of the deal. Their withdrawal would be overseen by Russian Military Police and the Syrian Border Guards, which would enter the zone at noon on 23 October.
- The YPG would also withdraw from the cities of Manbij and Tell Rifaat. (Note: Both of these cities are further to the south and not covered by the depth of the buffer zone, but are nonetheless explicitly mentioned in the agreement.)
- Following the YPG withdrawal, joint Russian-Turkish ground patrols would be held in the buffer zone area, but only within 10 kilometres (6.2 mi) from the border and not including Qamishli. (Note: No joint patrols will be held in the remaining part of the buffer zone.) (Note: Later, the Turkish President announced that the patrols would only be held to a depth of 7km, as opposed to 10. No reason was given for this change.)
- Turkey would retain sole control of the areas it had captured during its offensive between the towns of Tell Abyad and Ras al-Ayn.
- The Syrian Government would construct and man 15 border posts on the Turkish-Syrian border.
- The parties would launch a joint effort to resettle Syrian refugees in a "safe and voluntary manner".
- The parties would agree to "preserve the political unity and territorial integrity of Syria" as well as protect the "national security of Turkey".
- The parties would agree to reaffirm the importance of the Adana Agreement. Russia will facilitate the implementation of the Adana Agreement.

== Implementation and incident timeline ==
- On 22 October 2019, senior YPG officials stated that the group had completed its withdrawal from the buffer zone region.
- On 23 October 2019, Russian forces conducted their first patrol in Northern Syria.

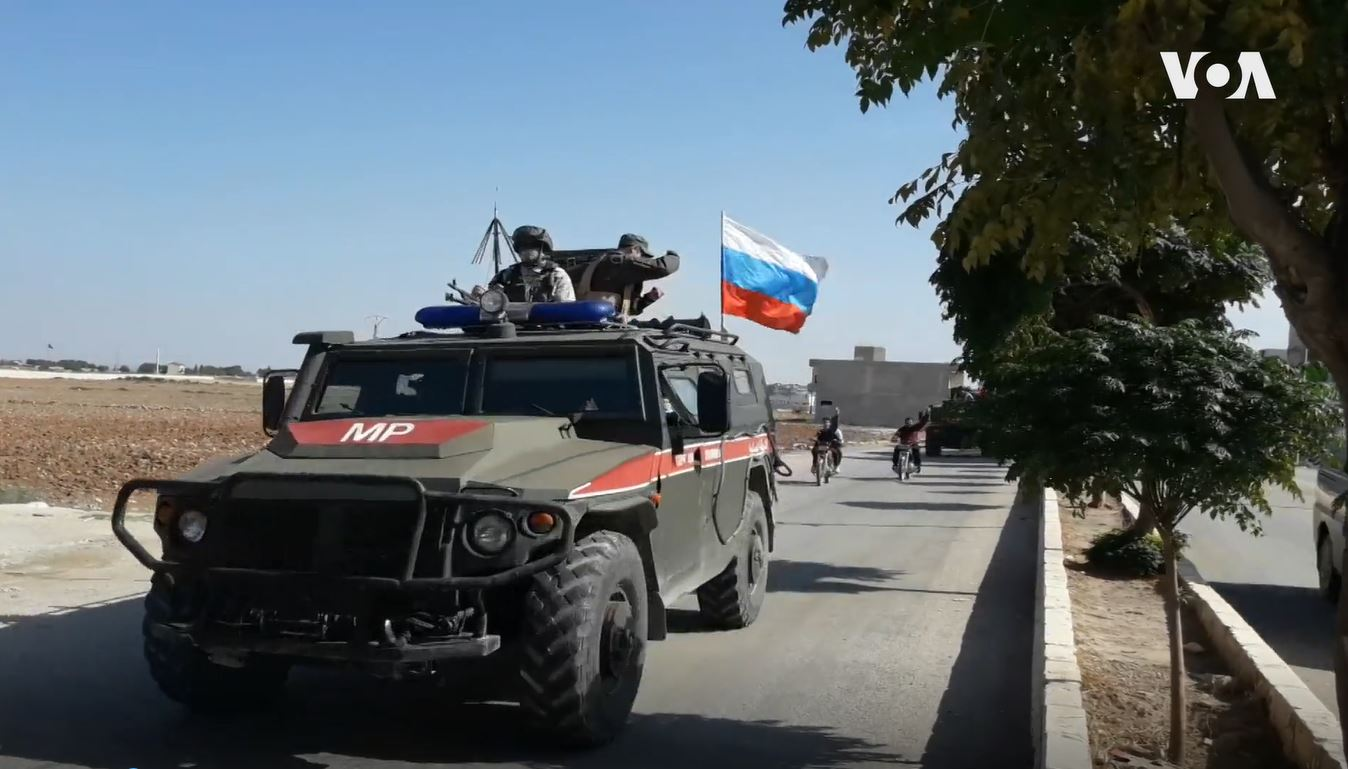
Russian Military Police enter Kobanî on 24 October 2019, as part of the Buffer Zone deal

- On 24 October 2019, the SDF said Turkey was violating the deal by launching a ground offensive against three villages in the country's north
  - Russia stated that the implementation of the zone was "on track" and announced that it was sending additional military policemen and heavy equipment to aid in its implementation.
  - The SDF announced that the Kurdish fighters had already withdrawn from the buffer zone.
- On 27 October 2019, Turkey said an attack by Kurdish forces left one Turkish soldier dead and five others injured. Turkish forces responded within the framework of self-defence".
  - The Syrian Democratic Forces officially announced their support for the deal, stating that their fighters would deploy to new positions deeper into Syria, as they stated that Syrian Government border guards were taking up their previous positions along the border.
- On 28 October 2019, following a large-scale deployment of Syrian Army troops to various border villages in the few days prior, the Syrian Army deployed to the town of Al-Darbasiyah along the Syrian-Turkish border for the first time in seven years.
  - 45 SDF vehicles carrying troops and heavy artillery departed Amuda and headed towards the country's south. The Syrian Government stated that the withdrawal had been carried out in coordination with the Syrian Army.
- On 30 October 2019, the Turkish President announced that the joint Russian-Turkish ground patrols within the zone would begin on 1 November, but would be limited only to a 7 kilometres (4.3 mi) deep area within the buffer zone. He however said, that the zone could be expanded to the full 10 kilometers, should SDF attacks on Turkey continue. The Turkish President further stated that he believed that the YPG withdrawal from the buffer zone had not fully taken place.

=== Syrian-Turkish clashes ===
- On 31 October 2019, heavy clashes took place between the Syrian Army and Turkish forces near Ras al-Ayn, after the Syrian National Army attacked several villages to the south of the town. Syrian state broadcaster SANA said the Turkish-backed forces were seizing a water plant and thus cutting off water to the Al-Hasakah Governorate.
  - Turkey's defence ministry announced that it had detained 18 people it suspected were Syrian Army servicemen, which had reportedly attacked Turkish forces near the town. It further stated that it had immediately entered into negotiations with Russia to release the captured soldiers.
  - The Syrian Observatory for Human Rights stated that at least 5 Syrian Army servicemen had been killed by Turkish artillery shelling on the edge of the village of Assadiya. It also reported that Turkish-backed rebel groups had executed a captured Syrian Army soldier. The observatory added that clashes had continued past that point.
  - The Syrian Army and Syrian Democratic Forces launched a joint counter-attack and reportedly recaptured some of the areas they had lost during the SNA's assault that same day, after shelling Turkish-backed forces with heavy artillery.
  - The Syrian Army sent considerable reinforcements to the front line in an attempt to stop Turkish-backed forces from advancing.
  - The SDF Commander, Mazloum Abdi, said Turkey was failing to adhere to the ceasefire agreement, stating that he believed Turkey had partnered with jihadists to occupy Christian villages and threaten Assyrians with "annihilation". Another SDF spokesman stated that Turkish-backed forces had continued with their advance, including by attacking areas held by the Syrian Army. He stated that Turkey had used Syrian Airspace to aid its army and "its jihdaists" to attack the region.

=== Start of joint patrols ===
- On 1 November 2019, the first joint Russian-Turkish ground and air patrol was held within the buffer zone. The joint patrol covered 110 kilometres (68 mi) of territory along the border, going up to 7 km deep into Syrian territory - less than the 10 originally set out in the deal.
  - Turkey released the 18 men which were taken prisoner the previous day. This unilateral prisoner release caused considerable tensions within the ranks of the Syrian National Army, drawing criticism from some fighters that the release constituted "a betrayal of the religion". The Homs al-Adiyyeh Brigade of the Sultan Murad Division of the SNA subsequently defected to join Jaysh al-Izza in protest. Ahrar al-Sharqiya also condemned the release, but blamed Salim Idris, who serves as Minister of Defence of the internationally unrecognized Syrian Interim Government, instead of the Turkish government.
- On 3 November 2019, the Syrian Observatory for Human Rights reported that the SDF had launched a large attack against Turkish-backed forces near Ras al-Ayn, subsequently managing to recapture 13 villages from them despite intensive artillery bombardment by the Turkish Army.
- On 5 November 2019, the second round of joint Russian-Turkish ground patrols were held. Russian and Turkish military vehicles, observed by Turkish UAVs, patrolled for 160 kilometres (99 mi) in the area between Kobanî and Tell Abyad. Following the end of the patrol, the Turkish Armed Forces withdrew to the Turkish side of the border. While patrolling near Kobani, the vehicles were pelted repeatedly with stones thrown by local residents.
  - Turkish President Erdogan accused the United States of continuing to carry out joint patrols with the YPG in Syria. He further alleged that the YPG hadn't left their positions at Manbij and Tell Rifaat, as the second buffer deal required. He attempted to justify the Turkish-backed forces' incursions outside of their zone of control in the previous few days by stating that he believed that SDF units had gathered on the edge of the Turkish control zone around Ras al-Ayn and were preparing attacks on Turkish and Turkish-backed forces within the town itself. He added that Turkey would continue to fight until the last "terrorist" was "neutralized".
  - Syrian state media announced that the Syrian Army had deployed units near the town of Qamishli, in what it reported was a bid to "counter Turkey's aggression".
- On 8 November 2019 a Syrian citizen was killed after being run over by a Turkish military vehicle, which was conducting a joint patrol with Russian forces. The man was reportedly a part of a group of residents which were throwing stones at the Turkish vehicles in protest of the joint patrols.
  - The spokesman for the Kurdish-led SDF reported that Turkish troops had fired tear gas against anti-patrol protesters in Al-Malikiyah - which was under the joint control of SDF and American forces, but nonetheless part of the 10 km patrol zone. He further alleged that 10 civilians were injured by the gas. He accused Russia of complicity in both incidents, as the patrols were carried out under "Russia's auspices".
  - Local residents released footage on social media, showing themselves once again throwing stones at Turkish armored vehicles during joint patrols, while ignoring their Russian counterparts.
- On 9 November 2019, heavy clashes erupted between Syrian and Turkish forces along the buffer zone. Several people were injured, including a SANA reporter.
  - The Syrian Democratic Forces released a statement in which they claimed to have killed 13 fighters belonging to the Syrian National Army in combat around Ayn Issa, while sustaining 12 casualties themselves.
  - The Turkish Ministry of Defense stated that they had recorded a total of 8 alleged ceasefire violations by the SDF within a 24-hour period.
- On 12 November 2019, the fifth round of the joint Russian-Turkish military patrols was diverted from its intended route near Kobani by local anti-patrol protesters, which attacked the Turkish vehicles with stones and fire extinguishers. Nevertheless, the Turkish Defence Ministry stated that the patrols were continuing, despite what it termed to be "provocations by terrorists".
- On 14 November 2019, sixth round of the joint Russian-Turkish military patrol completed a 45 km long area. Turkish Ministry of National Defense stated: "Turkish and Russian units accompanied by UAVs completed the sixth joint land patrol in the east of the Euphrates as planned".
- On 16 November 2019, seventh round of the joint Russian-Turkish military patrol completed. Turkish Ministry of National Defense states: "Turkish and Russian units completed their seventh joint land patrol in the Qamishli-Derik sector with four vehicles each and UAV support in the east of the Euphrates."
- Joint patrols continued through 2019 and by 27 January 2020, the Russian and Turkish Armed Forces had conducted a total of 23 joint patrols inside the buffer zone. The final joint patrol reported by the Syrian Observatory for Human Rights was the 24th patrol held on 30 January.

=== Russian-American tensions ===
- By late January 2020, Russian forces repeatedly clashed with residual American troops left inside the zone. US forces based from an American base at al-Wazir intercepted a Russian patrol and prevented it from setting up a military base at Al-Kharitah. A verbal altrecation took place between the two sides and escalated into the raising of weapons, but a clash was prevented by SDF mediation. A similar incident shortly thereafter was reported to have significantly increased tensions between the two sides. Russia responded by deploying advanced air defence systems in its Qamishli airbase.
- On 3 February 2020, American forces attempted to block Russian patrol on the M4 highway. The Russian patrol drove around the roadblock via dirt roads and sent several helicopters to fly over American forces. US military helicopters then began pursuing the Russian helicopters until they reached Ras al-Ayn airspace. A similar incident occurred on 4 February, this time with a Russian vehicle reportedly ramming a US armored vehicle which was blocking its path. Despite this, no military hostilities were reported to have taken place between the two sides.

=== Russian-Turkish tensions and Turkish rejection of joint patrols ===
- On 1 February 2020, Russian Forces closed the border crossing between Amuda and Al-Darbasiyah, blocking it with large cement blocks. It had previously been opened by Turkey as the patrols began.
- On 4 February 2020, the Turkish Armed Forces prevented a Russian military delegation from inspecting a water project near Olukah in Al-Hasakah, reportedly firing into the air in order to force the Russian forces to withdraw. The Syrian Observatory for Human Rights opined that the incident demonstrated "increasing differences" between the two sides.
- In early February 2020 the Turkish Armed Forces refused to participate in joint patrols with their Russian counterparts twice. Turkish troops informed a Russian officer on 6 February that they will not take part in the patrols and they were subsequently held by Russian forces alone. That same day the Syrian Arab News Agency reported that the Tell Tamer power station was put out of service as a result of what it stated were Turkish attacks against the overhead power lines that fed the station. It also alleged that Turkish attacks had caused great damage to other local infrastructure, as well as killed a number of civilians in the area.
- Intermittent clashes and shelling occurred in early February, mostly as Turkish and pro-Turkish forces attacked SDF and government positions and made minor unsuccessful attempts to advance. Several casualties were reported.

=== Resumption of joint patrols ===
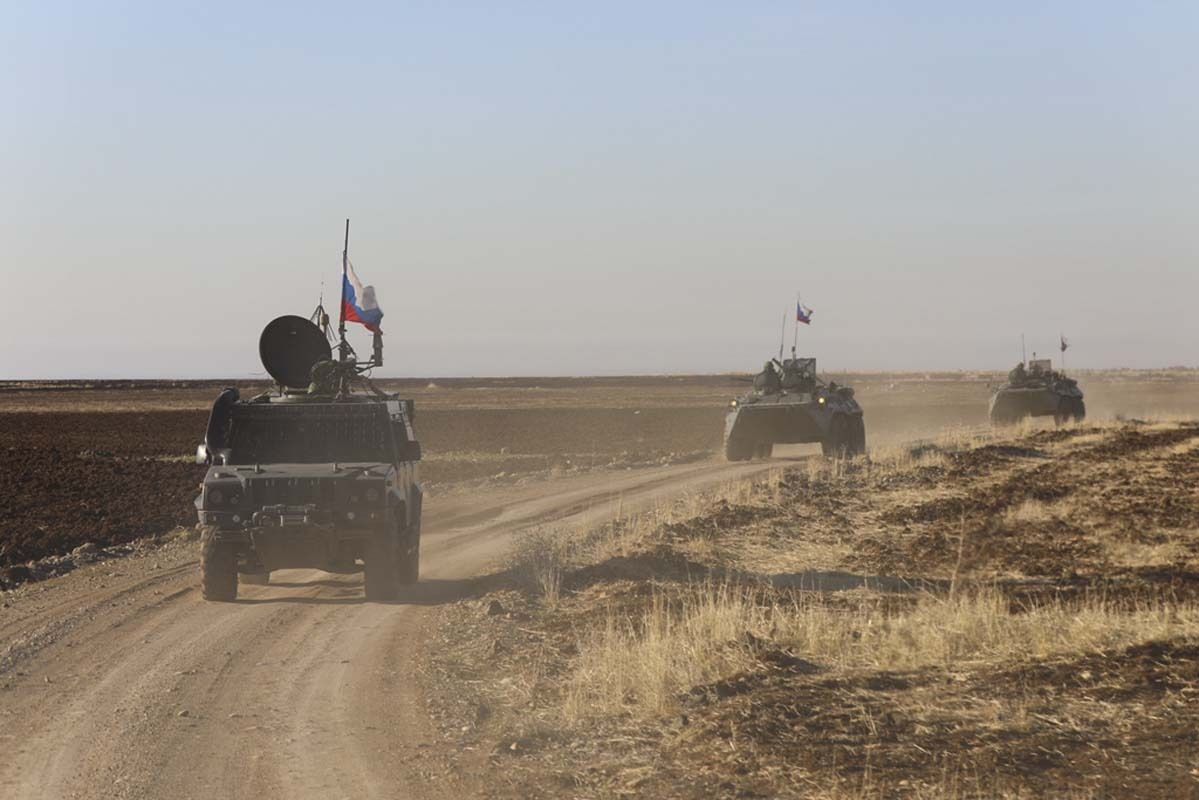
Russian patrol in al-Hasakah province, December 2020

- Following multiple Turkish refusals to take part in joint patrols with their Russian counterparts, a joint patrol was finally held on 17 February 2020, when 4 Russian and 4 Turkish vehicles patrolled parts of the buffer area together.
- By 18 February 2020, joint Russian-Turkish patrols had resumed per their usual schedule.

=== During the fall of the regime ===
- On 6 December 2024, the SDF capture territory from the Ba'athist regime in Raqqa Governorate during the opposition offensives. Assad's troops started to hand over territory to the SDF in northeastern Syria.
- On 9 December 2024, Russia withdrew from their bases in Manbij and Kobani.

== Reactions ==
- United Nations - On 1 November 2019 the UN Secretary-General met with President Erdogan of Turkey to discuss Turkey's proposal to relocate a large number of Syrian Refugees in Turkey to the Safe Zone. Mr. Guterres informed the Turkish President that the UNHCR will immediately form a team to study the proposal and engage in discussions with Turkish authorities, in line with its mandate. The Secretary-General greenlighted the proposal but told the Turkish President that the relocations should be "voluntary, safe and dignified".
- Syrian Democratic Forces - The SDF stated that they consider themselves as "Syrian and a part of Syria", adding that they will agree to work with the Syrian Government. The SDF officially announced their support for the deal on 27 October 2019, five days after the memorandum was made.
- Ba'athist Syria - Syrian President Bashar al-Assad thanked the Russian President for his role in the negotiation of the deal and expressed his full support for it. At the same time, he raised concerns about Turkish interference in Syrian affairs and dubbed Turkish President Erdogan a "thief".
- Turkey - Turkish President Recep Tayyip Erdoğan threatened to forcefully "clear terrorists" from the Syrian-Turkish border should the deal fail. He further reiterated his threat to let the Syrian refugees residing in Turkey at that point to freely emigrate into Europe, if Turkey does not receive "support" in its plan for the relocation of 1 to 2 million refugees within the buffer zone in what the Turkish President dubbed the "first stage" of their return.
- Iran - Iran's foreign ministry called the agreement "a positive step" and stated that it "backed any move to restore stability in the region", the opposite of its stance on the prior Northern Syria Buffer Zone.
- United States - US President Donald Trump praised the deal that he viewed as allowing "someone else [to] fight over this long bloodstained land", following which he ordered the lifting of the sanctions that he had placed on Turkey nine days prior as a reaction to the start of Turkey's offensive.
- Germany - German Chancellor Angela Merkel proposed that the buffer zone be enforced through an international force. Turkish Foreign Minister Mevlüt Çavuşoğlu stated that such a plan was unrealistic.

== See also ==
- Eastern Syria insurgency
- Insurgency in Idlib
- SDF insurgency in Northern Aleppo
- Daraa insurgency
