= Faruk Loğoğlu =

Turkish politician

Osman Faruk Loğoğlu
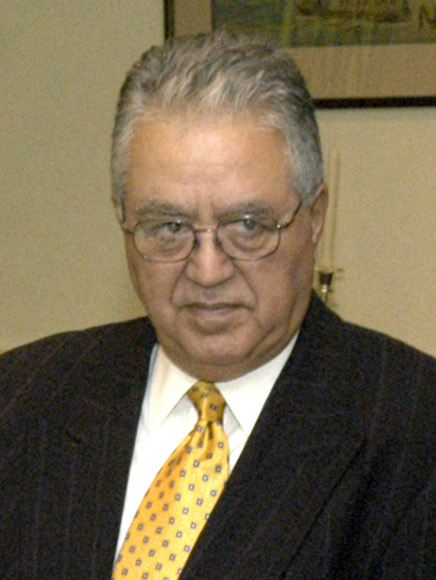

Turkish Foreign Ministry Undersecretary
- In office March 2000 – September 2001
- Preceded by: Korkmaz Haktanır
- Succeeded by: Uğur Ziyal

Member of the Grand National Assembly
- In office 12 June 2011 – 7 June 2015
- Constituency: Adana (2011)

Personal details
- Born: Osman Faruk Loğoğlu; October 15, 1941 (age 84) Ankara, Turkey
- Party: Republican People's Party (CHP)
- Spouse: Mevhibe Loğoğlu
- Education: Brandeis University (BA, MA); Princeton University (PhD)

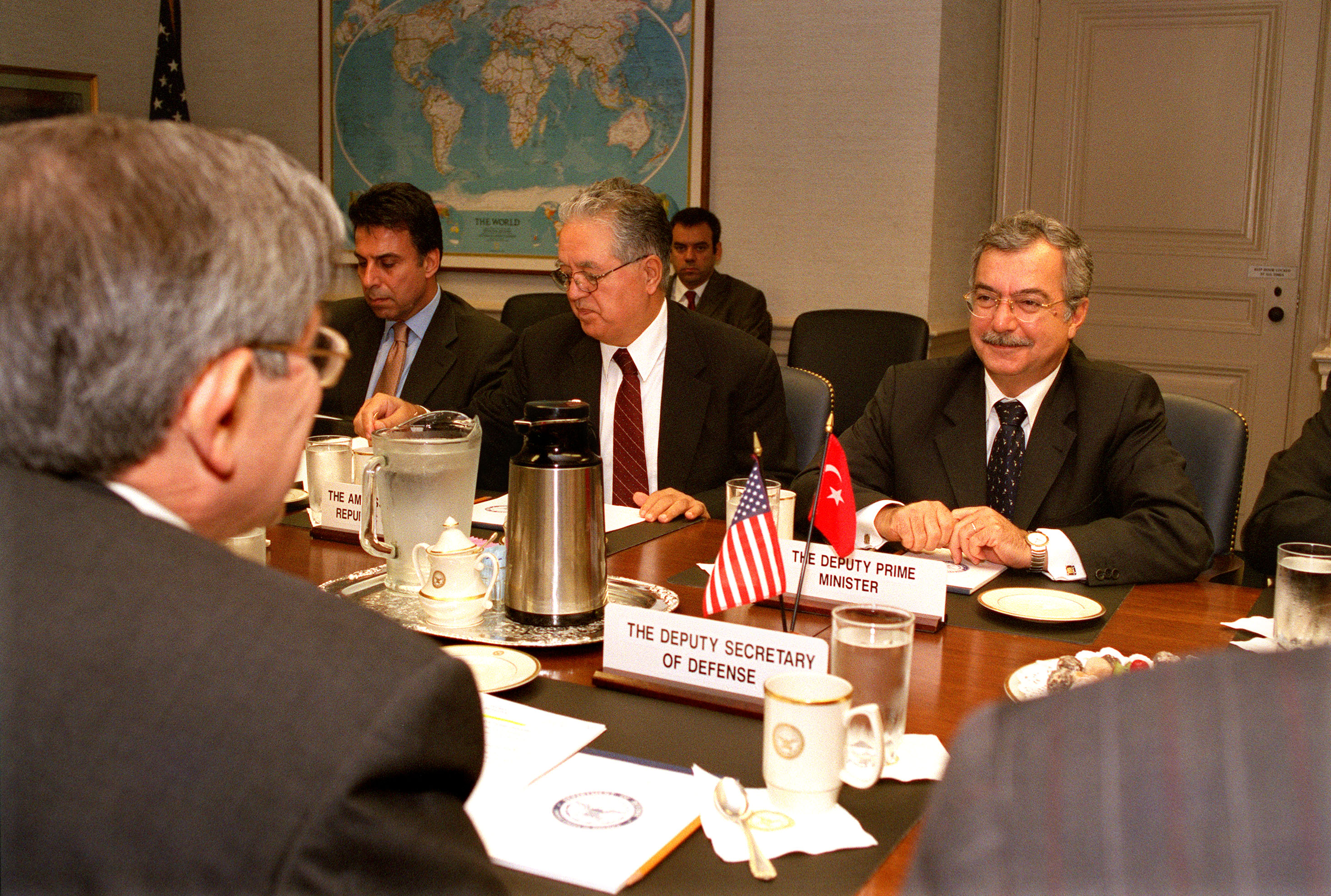
Osman Faruk Logoglu (center)

Osman Faruk Loğoğlu (born 1941) is a Turkish diplomat and the former Turkish ambassador to the United States of America, having served from 2001 to 2005.

== Education ==
Loğoğlu graduated from Tarsus American College and received his undergraduate and master's degree in political science at Brandeis University in Waltham, MA on the Wien International Scholarship, and his Ph.D. from Princeton University in 1970.

== Career ==
Loğoğlu has more than thirty-five years of experience in the Turkish Ministry of Foreign Services (MFS), and has specifically addressed issues relating to Turkey's external affairs, the Middle East and Europe. Loğoğlu is currently the president of the Eurasian Strategic Studies Center (ASAM), one of the leading think tanks in Turkey, headquartered in Ankara. Additionally, he serves as deputy chairman of the Turkish National Commission for UNESCO, as acting president of the Foundation for Local Volunteers for Disaster Relief, and as a member of the board of the Strategic Studies Center of the Turkish Ministry of Foreign Affairs.

Prior to entering the Turkish Ministry of Foreign Services, Loğoğlu was a lecturer in political science at Middlebury College in Vermont, from 1969 to 1970.

From 1973 to 1976, Loğoğlu held the position of first secretary at the European Union and in Dhaka, Bangladesh from 1976 to 1978.

During the 1980s Ambassador Loğoğlu was the head of the Department of Ministry of Foreign Affairs where his responsibilities centered primarily on bilateral political affairs and Cyprus and Greece issues, serving as a Counselor at the Permanent Mission of Turkey to the United Nations in New York from 1980 to 1984.

From 1986 to 1989, Loğoğlu was the consulate general in Hamburg, Germany. He was appointed the deputy undersecretary in 1998.

Dr. Loğoğlu served as the Turkish ambassador to Baku, Azerbaijan from 1996 to 1998 and to Copenhagen, Denmark from 1993 to 1996.

He was appointed the undersecretary of the Turkish ministry of foreign affairs from 2000 to 2001, before assuming the position of the ambassador to the USA in 2001.

He retired from Turkish Foreign Service in 2006. He headed one of Turkey's major think tanks for two years (2006–2008), the Center for Eurasian Strategic Studies (ASAM) headquartered in Ankara. Loğoğlu also served as the Deputy Chairperson of the Turkish National Commission for UNESCO, 2006–2010 and chaired the Cultural Committee during the General Conference of UNESCO in Paris. Loğoğlu worked with the Turkey Change Movement (TDH) in 2010. He then joined the Republican People's Party (CHP) and was elected to the Turkish Parliament as adeputy from the province of Adana in the June 2011 elections. He is now a member of the Foreign Relations Committee of the Turkish Grand National Assembly (TBMM), a member of CHP's Party Council and a Vice-chairperson of CHP in charge of foreign relations and organizations abroad.

== Authorship ==
Loğoğlu is the author of the book Ismet Inonu and the Making of Modern Turkey, a biography about the second president of the Turkish Republic, İsmet İnönü.

== Personal ==
He is married to Mevhibe Loğoğlu.

Legal offices
| Preceded by Korkmaz Haktanır | Turkish Foreign Ministry Undersecretary; 2000-2001 | Succeeded by Sıtkı Uğur Ziyal |
