= Samuel Lyde =

British missionary and author (1825–1860)

Samuel Lyde (1825–1860) was an English writer and Church of England missionary who lived and worked in Syria in the 1850s and wrote a pioneering book on the Alawite sect. In 1856, he sparked months of anti-Christian rioting in Ottoman Palestine when, during a visit there, he killed a beggar.

== Life and missionary work ==
Modern Syria and surrounding countries, showing locations visited by Lyde including the village of Bhamra where he established his mission.

Lyde was born in 1825. He obtained a degree in 1848 after studying at Jesus College, Cambridge and in 1851 he was awarded an M.A, took holy orders as a clergyman of the Church of England and became employed as a fellow of Jesus College. Poor health, according to Lyde, prevented him from "exercising the duties of his profession in England, at least during the winter months" and, therefore, in the winter of 1850/1851 he made "the usual tour" of Egypt and Syria. While on the "tour", he decided, because of his health, to settle permanently in Syria, then a part of the Ottoman Empire. While visiting Beirut, the British consul suggested to him that he could occupy his time by working as a missionary to the Alawites, also known as Nusayris, a secretive mountain sect who later provided two of modern Syria's leaders: Bashar al-Assad and his father, Hafez al-Assad.

Lyde was persuaded by the idea. From 1853 to 1859, he lived among the Alawite Kalbiyya community, and established a mission and school in Bhamra, a village overlooking the Mediterranean port of Latakia. However, he later wrote that living among them convinced him that the Alawites fulfilled St Paul's description of the heathen: "filled with all unrighteousness, fornication, wickedness, covetousness, maliciousness".

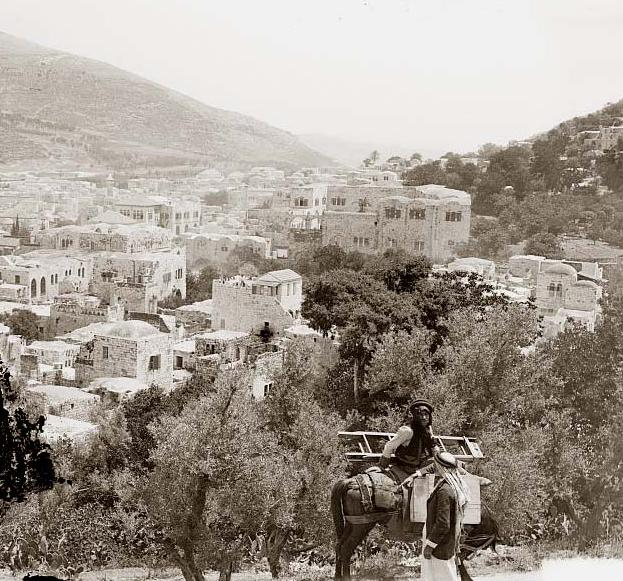
Nablus at the end of the 19th century

Lyde travelled to Palestine in 1856, and as he rode on his horse into Nablus he shot and killed a beggar who was trying to steal his coat. It was either an accidental discharge of the gun or Lyde had lost his nerve and fired. An anti-Christian riot ensued during which Christian houses were burned and several Greeks and Prussians were killed. Lyde took refuge in the town governor's house but was eventually put on trial for murder. The only witnesses were three women who accused him of attacking and deliberately killing the beggar. However, the testimony of women was inadmissible in Ottoman courts and he was acquitted of murder, although he was ordered to pay compensation to the man's family. The violent rioting continued for several months and even spread to Gaza.

Lyde developed a deranged mental state and had delusions that he was John the Baptist, Jesus Christ or God himself. However, he subsequently recovered sufficiently to write a book on the Alawites, which he completed in Cairo shortly before his death. He died in Alexandria in Egypt in April 1860. He was 35 years old. He bequeathed his mission at Bhamra to two American missionaries, R. J. Dodds and J. Beattie (Note: Robert James Dodds and Joseph Beattie had begun their missionary work in Syria in 1856 on behalf of a Reformed Presbyterian denomination known as the Reformed Presbyterian Church Old Light Synod.) of the Reformed Presbyterian Church.

== Publications and influence ==
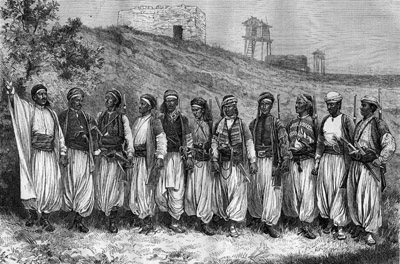
Alawites dancing the Dabke folk dance, 1880

Lyde wrote two books on the Alawites: The Anseyreeh and Ismaeleeh: A Visit to the Secret Sects of Northern Syria with a View to the Establishment of Schools (1853) and The Asian Mystery Illustrated in the History, Religion and Present State of the Ansaireeh or Nusairis of Syria (1860). The latter is considered to be a pioneering work, and was the first monograph to be written on the Alawite-Nusayri religion. It remained the only Western book on the subject until 1900, when René Dussaud published his Histoire et religion des Nosairîs.

His description of Alawite doctrines was based on a document called Kitab al-mashyakha ("The Manual of the Shaykhs"), which he said he had bought from a Christian merchant from Latakia. This document appears to have differed in certain respects from other sources on Alawite doctrine. For many years it was thought to have been lost and only available through the extracts quoted in translation by Lyde. In 2013, it was announced that the document Lyde had used had been discovered in the archives of the Old Library of Jesus College, Cambridge. Lyde had bequeathed it to his old college, and, apparently, had sent it to Cambridge shortly before his death.

His writing reveals a negative view of the Alawites and, in particular, he was critical of what he saw as their brigandage, feuds, lying and divorce. He went as far as saying that "the state of [Alawi] society was a perfect hell upon earth". The Asian Mystery became a popular book and has been described as "colourful" but "unreliable" in some respects. Nevertheless, Lyde's account remains an influential source on Alawites, and, for instance, is widely quoted on the internet.
