= Ad-Diyar =

Daily newspaper in Lebanon

Addiyar الديار
- Type: Daily newspaper
- Format: Broadsheet
- Owner(s): Charles Ayoub
- Publisher: Al-Nahdah Publishing House
- Editor-in-chief: Charles Ayoub
- Founded: 1941; 84 years ago
- Political alignment: Pan-Syrian
- Language: Arabic
- Headquarters: Beirut, Lebanon
- Website: Ad Diyar

Ad-Diyar (Arabic: الديار, lit. 'The Home') is an Arabic-language daily newspaper published in Beirut, Lebanon, which has been in circulation since 1941.

== History ==
Ad Diyar was first published in 1941 as an Arabic political daily that is published in broadsheet format.

The editor-in-chief and owner of the paper is Charles Ayoub, a Lebanese journalist known for his pro-Syrian stance. Leading Lebanese caricaturist Pierre Sadek worked for the daily. The daily gained significant popularity in 1987 when it publicly criticized the militia leaders. Ad Diyar was temporarily closed by Michel Aoun, then interim Lebanese prime minister and army commander, in January 1990 due to its clash with Aoun policies. The newspaper resumed publication much later.

The circulation of Ad Diyar was 20,000 copies in 2003, making it the third best selling newspaper in Lebanon.

== Orientation ==
The paper is reported to be pro-Syrian. In addition, the daily has close ideological links to the Syrian Social Nationalist Party in Lebanon (SSNP-L).
