= Adnan Badr Hassan =

Syrian security official

- عدنان بدر حسن

Director of Political Security Directorate
- In office 1987 – October 2002
- President: Hafez al-Assad; Bashar al-Assad
- Preceded by: Ahmad Sa'id Salih
- Succeeded by: Ghazi Kanaan

Personal details
- Born: Adnan Sulaiman Badr Al Hassan Al-Mukharram, Syria
- Party: Ba'ath Party
- Education: Homs Military Academy

Military service
- Allegiance: Ba'athist Syria
- Branch/service: (Ba'athist Syria) Syrian Arab Armed Forces
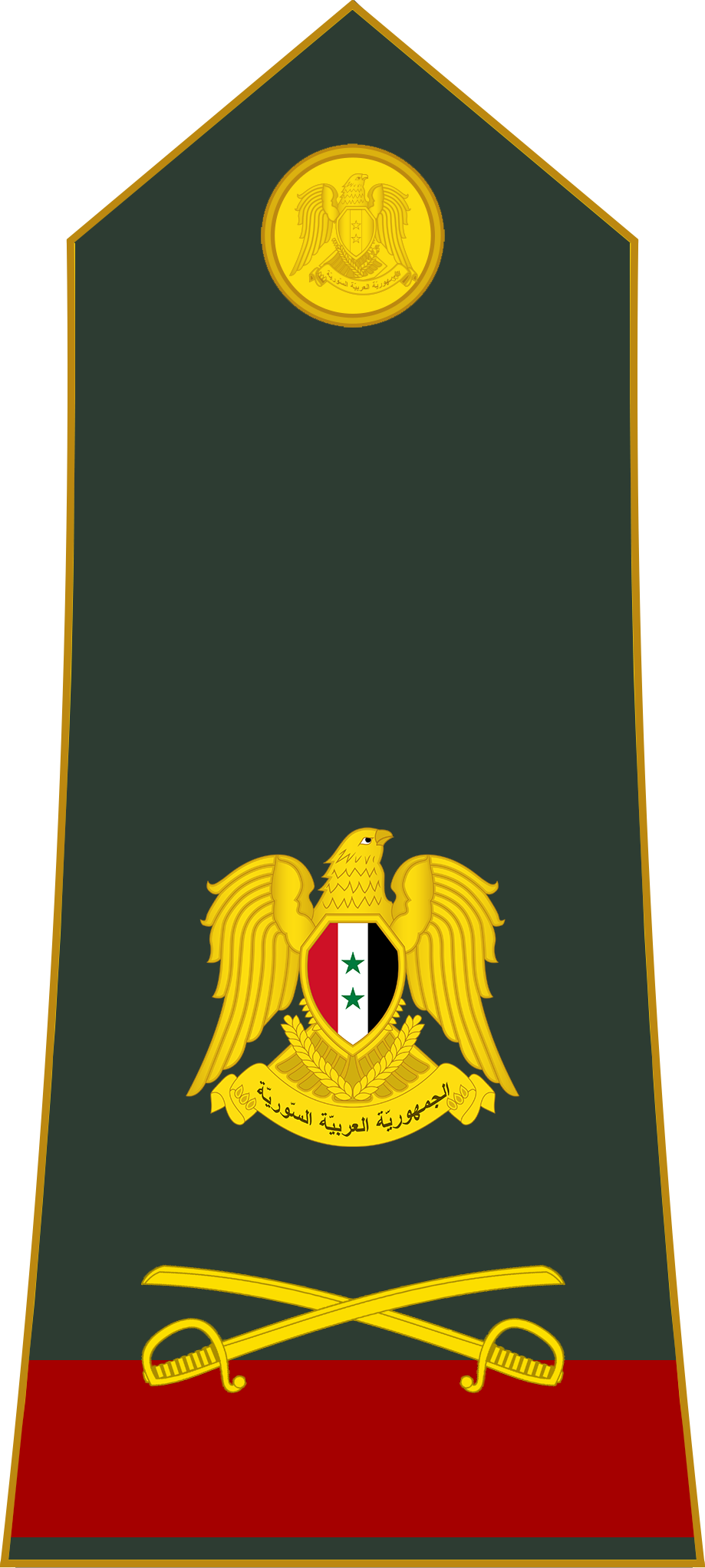
- Rank: Major General
- Commands: 9th Mechanized Infantry

Adnan Badr Hassan (Arabic: عدنان بدر حسن) is a retired Syrian major general, politician and a former chief of Syria's political security directorate.

== Background ==
Hassan hails from Alawite family from Al Mukharram, Homs governorate. He received religious education in Homs and attended the Homs Military Academy.

== Career ==
Hassan was a major general in the Syrian army. In 1973, he fought in Arab–Israeli war and was decorated for his performance. During the illness of Syrian President Hafez al-Assad between November 1983 and March 1984, Hassan was made one of the members of the secret military commanders committee. One of Hassan's commands was the ninth mechanized infantry of the army in 1985. He was appointed head of the political security directorate in 1987, replacing Ahmad Said Salih in the post. Hassan was one of Ali Duba's allies during this period. Hassan's term ended in October 2002, and he was replaced by Ghazi Kanaan as head of the political security directorate.

Hassan became a member of the Syrian Regional Branch of the Arab Socialist Ba'ath Party's Central Committee in 2000 following the death of Hafez al-Assad. Hassan retired from politics in 2005.

=== Activities ===
Hassan signed the agreement between Syria and Turkey on 20 October 1998, signifying that Syria recognized the PKK as a terrorist organization. The agreement is known as Adana Agreement. He was further involved in the security talks between the countries in 2000.
