= Sıtkı Uğur Ziyal =

Turkish diplomat

Turkish Foreign Ministry Undersecretary
- In office 1 October 2001 – 11 November 2004
- Preceded by: Osman Faruk Loğoğlu
- Succeeded by: Ali Tuygan

Personal details
- Born: August 25, 1944 (age 81) Istanbul, Turkey

Sıtkı Uğur Ziyal (born 25 August 1944) is a Turkish diplomat.

== Education ==
He graduated from Robert College in 1961 and Ankara University Faculty of Political Sciences in 1965.

== Career ==
Ziyal entered the Turkish Ministry of Foreign Affairs in 1965. Ziyal's first diplomatic mission was as third secretary at the Department of Cyprus-Greece (1965-1967). For two years, Ziyal served in the Turkish military before returning to the Department of Cyprus-Greece, eventually becoming the second secretary during the period of peacemaking efforts in Cyprus. He then served as second and first secretary to the Embassy of Turkey to the Turkish Republic of Northern Cyprus.

In 1973, Ziyal became the chief of cabinet to Ümit Haluk Bayülken head of the Ministry of Foreign Affairs.

From 1976 to 1980, Ziyal served at the Turkish Embassy in Washington, DC. For fours years he served as the Consulate General for the Turkish-Conulate of Chicago (1983-1987).

On 20 October 1998, Ziyal chaired the Turkish delegation and served as the signatory Adana Agreement signed with Syria.

He became Deputy Undersecretary of the Ministry of Foreign Affairs (1998-2001) and Undersecretary (2001-2004).

For five years, he was the Ambassador to Italy in Rome (2004-2009). His assignment also covered Malta.

He has also served as the Turkish Permanent Representative to the UN Food and Agriculture Organization.

Legal offices
Preceded by Osman Faruk Loğoğlu	Turkish Foreign Ministry Undersecretary; 2001-2004	Succeeded by Ali Tuygan
