= Charles Ayoub =

Lebanese journalist

Charles Ayoub (Arabic: شارل أيوب) is a Lebanese journalist and businessman who is the editor-in-chief and owner of Ad-Diyar, an Arabic-language daily newspaper published in Lebanon, known for his pro-Syrian stance. He was formerly a member of the Syrian Social Nationalist Party in Lebanon, and a candidate for the Lebanese parliament in 1972 and 2009.
