= COVID-19 pandemic in Syria =

- Disease: COVID-19
- Pathogen: SARS-CoV-2
- First outbreak: Wuhan, Hubei, China
- Arrival date: 22 March 2020
- Confirmed cases: • 57,743 _{(Government reported only)} • 13,690 (needs update) _{(Including Interim Government and Rojava Administration reported cases)}
- Active cases: 0
- Recovered: 54,578
- Deaths: 3,165
- Fatality rate: 5.80%
- Territories: Аll 14 governorates (All government and non-government reports included).

Government website
- (Ba'athist Syria) MINISTRY OF HEALTH COVID-19 STATISTICS

The COVID-19 pandemic in Syria was part of the pandemic of coronavirus disease 2019 (COVID-19) caused by severe acute respiratory syndrome coronavirus 2 (SARS-CoV-2). The disease was confirmed to have reached Syria on 22 March 2020, when the first case was confirmed of a person who came from abroad. Syria has been considered especially vulnerable to the pandemic due to its civil war and dire humanitarian situation.

On 12 January 2020, the World Health Organization (WHO) confirmed that a novel coronavirus was the cause of a respiratory illness in a cluster of people in Wuhan City, Hubei Province, China, which was reported to the WHO on 31 December 2019. Many people in Syria did not have confidence in the government's transparency during the pandemic, accusing it of hiding the true numbers of cases and deaths, especially in Damascus, Rif Dimashq, and Aleppo. It has been speculated that doctors in hospitals and medical facilities were being threatened with being fired or even being arrested and detained by the government forces if they said anything about the truth of what was happening in the hospitals. It has also been rumoured that the Syrian state has even gone so far as to suggest terminating the lives of suspected COVID-19 patients. This led people who are experiencing some symptoms or even being sure about being infected to not telling the government nor seeking governmental or even private medical care, and quarantining themselves at home out of fear if possible. Analysts reasoning with these claims highlight the example of misinformation about the government's numbers is the number of cases registered in neighboring countries of people arriving from Syria, and sometimes that number in one day was greater than those reported by the Syrian government during a certain period of time.

The late Syrian government, which was overthrown in late 2024, along with its allies, claimed that the civil war, in combination with the economic situation in Syria and sanctions by Western governments, limited the capacity in which adequate COVID-19 PCR tests can be conducted and prevent vital supplies for treating and managing the pandemic from being imported. The response was led by Health Minister Hassan al-Ghabbash since 2020.

== Timeline ==
=== March 2020 ===
2 March: The government of the Kurdistan Region in Iraq, ordered the complete closure of the Semalka Border Crossing at the Iraq–Syria border into the Kurdish-led Autonomous Administration of North and East Syria until further notice as "a precautionary measure to prevent the transmission of the coronavirus to the areas of autonomous administration of North and East Syria, excluding emergency cases".

10 March: The Syrian Observatory for Human Rights reported that there have been outbreaks of COVID-19 in Tartus, Damascus, Homs and Latakia provinces. According to the UK-based monitor's sources, a strict gag order has been issued to forbid medical personnel from discussing the issue.

11 March: A health official from the Jazira Region in the Autonomous Administration of North and East Syria said that there are no documented cases of COVID-19 in the province. Kurdistan TV reported from Qamishli, the largest Kurdish city in Syria, stating that 1% of the population in the city are wearing protective masks, as pharmacies and medical equipment sales centers were running low on the supply of masks. Furthermore, by 11 March, four suspected cases of COVID-19 had been reported to the Syrian Health Authority, which contacted the World Health Organization. The tests came back as negative.

13 March:

- A ministerial team approved a series of precautionary steps, including the suspension of universities, schools, and institutes as of 14 March. (Note: The suspension was originally set to end on 2 April, but it was delayed many times until the government decided to end the second semester for all school students and let them pass on the first semester's test results. Universities reopened on 31 May 2020.)
- The Syrian General Sports Federation announced that all sports activities will be suspended starting 14 March. (Note: The suspension was originally set to expire on 23 May.)

14 March:

- The Ministry of Education announced suspension of lessons and studying in public and private schools and as of Saturday 14 March until Thursday, 2 April. (Note: The reopening date was later changed.)
- The Ministry of Higher Education and scientific Research decided to postpone all exams in public and private universities, including open education system examinations, the national exam and language tests for master's degree from Saturday 14 March until 2 April. (Note: Date was later changed.)
- The Ministry of Endowments announced suspension of all schools, secondary, the religious institutes, University of the Levant for Islamic Science, Dar Al Aman Foundation for Orphans Care (NGO) and Sons of martyrs which are affiliated to the ministry from Saturday 14 March until 2 April.
- The Pakistani Chief Minister of Sindh province alleged that nationals returning from the Middle East had imported the disease. Out of 14 confirmed cases in Sindh province, eight had a travel history that included Syria. The day earlier, World Health Organization said that all Pakistani cases were imported, but without mentioning the exact origin of those. The Syrian government denied any cases of COVID-19 in the country. Nevertheless, authorities delayed upcoming parliamentary elections, shut down schools, and canceled most public events to prevent any spread of the coronavirus.
- The Kurdish-led Autonomous Administration of North and East Syria canceled all gatherings, limited entry to the region to residents only on Tuesdays of each week and closed all schools, universities and educational institutes until further notice.

15 March: The Cabinet tasked the Industry Ministry with instructing private sector factories that produce cleaning and sanitization products to work at maximum capacity with no less than three shifts to ensure their availability. The Ministries were instructed to implement the decision to reduce working hours and to provide the necessary cleaning and sanitization products at work places. The Cabinet also decided to cancel the export of all the medical requirements and equipment for diagnosis and quarantine centers.

19 March: The Kurdish-led Autonomous Administration of North and East Syria imposed a curfew starting from 23 March at 06:00 am and prohibited movement among the subregions of northeastern Syria, as well as among the major cities within each region starting from 21 March at 06:00. Restaurants, cafes, commercial centers, bazaars, public parks, private medical clinics, wedding halls and mourning tents are to be closed while hospitals, public and private health centers, international organizations, the Red Cross and Crescent, pharmacies, sterilization committees, cleaners, bakeries, food stores, food and baby milk trucks and fuel tanks were excluded from the ban.

20 March: Damascus Governorate and the Syrian Arab Red Crescent began disinfection of Yusuf al-Azma Square and other areas of Damascus.

21 March:

- Prime Minister Imad Khamis issued a circular asking ministers to take the necessary decisions to suspend work in the ministries and their affiliated entities starting from the next day until further notice as long as the suspension does not constitute an obstacle to efforts to face the risks of the spread of the Coronavirus. The circular reduces the number of workers in essential institutions to the minimum possible, and comes into effect starting Sunday, 22 March 2020 until further notice. Khamis underlined that the suspension of work does not include productive facilities and institutions. The Prime Minister also issued another circular requiring governors to take the necessary measures to close markets and suspend all commercial, service, cultural and social activities. The circular excluded centers of selling foodstuffs, pharmacies and private health centers with an emphasis on the necessity for the exempted parties to abide by measures and procedures of the public health and safety. The objective of both circulars is to minimize the movement of citizens in markets and elsewhere.
- General Command of the Syrian Army and Armed Forces announced suspension of the recruitment measures for the military service. The army command also suspended legal procedures related to summoning the charged citizens or legally prosecuting those who do not attend because of the current health conditions.
- The Ministry Interior decided to stop the work of renewing and granting passports, travel documents, all kinds of residences, driving licenses and criminal record documents starting Monday, 23 March 2020 until further notice.

22 March:

- The Cabinet suspended all forms of mass public and private transportation within provinces as of 8 pm on Monday and between provinces as of 8 pm on Tuesday, with the stipulation that ministries, union, and private production establishments provide transportation for their workers. The Cabinet also adopted the plan of the Health Ministry and other ministries for the next six months to confront the Coronavirus, which involves expanding quarantine and isolation centers, forming 19 emergency teams for epidemical detection, and setting up addition labs for diagnosing the virus in Damascus, Lattakia, and Aleppo in cooperation with the World Health Organization. In addition, the Cabinet allowed private sector establishments that produce sanitizers and detergents to import the necessary materials for making sanitizers and rubbing alcohol for 15 days. The Cabinet affirmed that stocks of consumer products are available and sufficient for the coming months, requesting that the Internal Trade and Consumer Protection Ministry send cars to distribute bread in city centers and rural areas.
- The Health Minister of Syria reported the first case of COVID-19 in Syria.

23 March: The Ministry of Press decided to suspend the publication of printed newspapers until further notice.

24 March: The Ministry of Interior declared a curfew from 6 pm to 6 am, effective starting next day (Wednesday, 25 March). (Note: Later, the government decided to extend the curfew during Fridays and Saturdays to be from 12 p.m. to 6 a.m starting 3 April 2020. After that, Curfew in all week-days was reduced to be from 7:30 p.m. to 6 a.m. during The holy Islamic month of Ramadan, which started 24 April 2020, and Eid, which started 24 May 2020. The curfew was later canceled completely starting 26 May 2020.)

25 March: The Ministry of Health reported three new cases. The three new cases were among those quarantined in the Dwair center after being abroad. Later the same day, around 19:00 local time, one new case was reported.

27 March:

- The government declared that commuting of citizens between province centers and all other urban and rural areas is disallowed at all times excluding those with clearance, starting Sunday, 29 March at 2 p.m. local time. (Note: Various exception periods were set later.)
- A 53-year-old man was admitted to hospital in the government-held part of Qamishli in northeast Syria. He was tested for coronavirus and the test was sent to Damascus for analysis. (Note: See 2 April for later info.)

29 March:

- The Ministry of Health reported that a woman died just after she arrived in hospital, and later she tested positive for the Coronavirus.
- The Ministry of Health announced 4 new cases were registered

30 March: The Ministry of Health announced one new death.

=== April 2020 ===
1 April: The Minister of Health said that authorities imposed a lockdown on Mneen town in Rif Dimashq Governorate to preserve public safety after the death of a woman from there because of COVID-19.

2 April:

- The Ministry of Health announced 6 new cases.
- The Ministry of Health announced that a lockdown was imposed on Al-Sayeda Zainab in Rif Dimashq Governorate to preserve public health and safety.
- The previously mentioned man in Qamishli dies of coronavirus the same day his test results come back positive. The man had no travel history outside the country.

4 April: The Ministry of Health announced two recoveries.

5 April: The Ministry of Health announced three new cases.

7 April: The Ministry of Health announced one recovery.

8 April: The Ministry of Health announced one recovery.

11 April: The Ministry of Health announced 6 new cases and one recovery.

14 April: The Ministry of Health announced 4 new cases.

15 April: The Ministry of Health announced 4 new cases.

17 April:

- The Ministry of Health announced 5 new cases.
- The Ministry of Health said in a statement that the government decided to lift lockdown on Al-Sayeda Zainab area after completing coronavirus tests for people in contact with infected patients and confirmed cases.
- Rojava announced its first case. But the Syrian government did not report it.

19 April: The Ministry of Health announced one death and one new case.

21 April: The Ministry of Health announced one recovery and three new cases.

25 April: The Ministry of Health announced 5 recoveries.

26 April:

- The Ministry of Health announced 3 recoveries and one new case.
- The Ministry of Health announced the end of the 25-day lockdown on Mneen town in northern Rif Dimashq Governorate after verifying that there were no infected or suspected cases of COVID-19 in the town.

27 April: The Ministry of Health announced 5 recoveries.

28 April: The Ministry of Health announced 2 recoveries.

=== May 2020 ===
1 May: The Ministry of Health announced 6 recoveries and one new case.

6 May: The Ministry of Health announced one new case.

8 May: The Ministry of Health announced 2 new cases. Later the same day, two recoveries were announced.

13 May: The Ministry of Health announced one new case.

14 May: The Syrian government's team tasked with taking measures to confront The Coronavirus indicated that it is possible to impose a full 24-hours-a-day curfew depending to the changes related to the virus. (Note: A 12-hours curfew from 6 p.m. to 6 a.m was already imposed since Wednesday 25 March 2020. Later, the government decided to extend the curfew during Fridays and Saturdays to be from 12 p.m. to 6 a.m starting 3 April 2020. After that, Curfew in all week-days was reduced to be from 7:30 p.m. to 6 a.m. during The holy Islamic month of Ramadan, which started 24 April 2020, and Eid, which started 24 May 2020. The curfew was later canceled completely starting 26 May 2020.)

15 May: The Ministry of Health announced 7 recoveries and 2 new cases.

16 May:

- The Ministry of Health said that the last 6 COVID-19 cases that have been registered in Syria were among people who had arrived from abroad, and that no cases among non-quarantined residents in the country have been registered since the beginning of May.
- The Ministry of Health announced one new case, and said that the patient was one of the already quarantined arrivals from the UAE.

17 May: The Ministry of Health announced 7 new cases, and said that the patients were among the already quarantined arrivals from Kuwait.

20 May:

- The Ministry of Health said that no local cases of COVID-19 have been registered in Syria for 20 days (Since the beginning of May), and that the registered cases during this period were for Syrians coming from abroad. The Ministry also pointed out to the shortage of test kits as a result of sanctions imposed on Syria.
- Some local newspapers and online news networks reported that both the Ministry of Interior and the Ministry of Health started investigating what they called "Irresponsible acts" of some quarantined people in Damascus after they threw their meals from the balconies in an act of protest. Associate Director of Health in Damascus, Ahmad Habbas, posted a photo of the thrown food on his Facebook account and said that some quarantined people in a Damascus quarantine facility threw the meals to 'pressure [the government] to discharge them [from quarantine] before the set time'.
  Syrians on social media widely criticized these acts. But some supported these forms of protesting what they called a corrupt quarantine system, claiming that nepotism is a common thing in the quarantine facilities and some people leave the mandatory 14-day quarantine in a matter of few hours just because they "know someone". and some mentioned even more forms of nepotism.

22 May:

- The Ministry of Health announced one recovery.
- The Ministry of Health announced one death and one new case among the Syrian arrivals from Kuwait.

23 May:

- The Ministry of Health announced 11 new cases among Syrian arrivals from Kuwait.
- The Syrian Minister of Health, Nizar Yazigi, Commented on rumors related to closing down Tartus seaport after suspecting that a Russian person there was infected with the Coronavirus, clarifying that 'the situation is different from how it is being portrayed'. The Minister said that the Russian person at the port was tested for COVID-19, and the results came back positive, noting that the test has a 70% accuracy.
  The minister also said that out of concern about the health of workers in the port and everyone else in the area, the workers were prevented from leaving the port until all those who interacted with the suspected case have been tested, asserting that all the workers' tests came back negative and so they were allowed to go to their homes.
  Yazigi said that work at the port is proceeding normally, and that another test will be conducted for the suspected case on the next day to ascertain whether they are infected or not. (Note: The person tested negative the next day. _{(See 24 May).})

24 May:

- The Ministry of Health announced 4 recoveries.
- The Ministry of Health announced 16 new cases among Syrian arrivals from outside the country; 6 from The UAE, 4 from Kuwait, 4 from Russia, and 2 from Sudan.
- The Ministry of Health said that the Russian person in Tartus seaport was tested again and the results came back negative this time.

25 May:

- The Ministry of Health announced 20 new cases among Syrian arrivals from outside the country; 15 from Kuwait, 3 from Sudan, one from Russia, and one from The UAE.
- The government decided that the curfew and restriction of movement among provinces will be lifted as of the next day (Tuesday 26 May 2020). But noted that there is still a possibility of a full curfew in the future depending on developments related to the pandemic.

26 May: The Ministry of Health announced 15 new cases among Syrian arrivals from outside the country; 9 from Kuwait, 5 from Sudan, and one from the UAE.

27 May: The Ministry of Health announced two recoveries.

28 May: The Ministry of Health announced one new case of a person among Syrian arrivals from Kuwait.

31 May:

- The Ministry of Health announced 3 recoveries.
- The Ministry of Health announced the death of a 74-year-old COVID-19 patient and said that the patient also had a liver tumor.

=== June 2020 ===
1 June:

- The Ministry of Health announced one case in As-Suwayda and said that the patient had a contact with another person who was infected, and the new patient is quarantined. (Note: This was initially believed to be the first case in As-Suwayda governorate.; This is case number 123.; Clarifications on this were made later the same day.)
- As-Suwayda's directorate of Health said that it also reported a second case of COVID-19 (the cases were number 122, 123 reported by the Ministry of Health) of a person coming from abroad and was discharged from the quarantine center after being tested negative. but during their mandatory quarantine at home afterwards, the person started showing symptoms and was tested positive after another test was done. The directorate also said that the person is back in quarantine and is receiving medical treatment, and people who the person had interacted with were tested and were put in quarantine. (Note: After this statement, the Ministry of Health's official COVID-19 website changed the number of cases in Damascus from 87 to 86 and in As-Suwayda from 1 to 2, with the total remaining 123.)

2 June:

- The Ministry of Health announced one death. The Ministry said that the patient had asthma and had undergone an open heart surgery in the past.
- The Ministry of Health announced 4 recoveries.
- The Ministry of Health's official COVID-19 website changed the number of cases in Damascus from 86 to 80, and In Latakia from 0 to 1, and in Homs from 0 to 5. With the total number of cases remaining 123. Which indicates that the government was reporting false data before this update. (Note: The government also did a similar change in the data from As-Suwayda the day before, after a statement from health officials there. (see the notes in 1 June).)

3 June: The Ministry of Health announced 3 recoveries.

4 June:

- The Ministry of Health announced one new case in Rif Dimashq, and said that the patient works as a driver on the Syria-Jordan border road.
- Most areas of hospitality venues such as hotels, restaurants, cafés, bars and nightclubs are permitted to re-open again.

6 June:

- The Ministry of Health announced 5 recoveries.
- The Ministry of Health announced one new case, and said that the patient works as a driver on the Syria-Jordan border road.

8 June:

- The Ministry of Health announced 16 new cases of COVID-19 in Ras al-Ma'ara town in Rif Dimashq Governorate, and said that the source of their infection is that they had a close contact with the truck driver who worked on the Syria-Jordan border road that was tested positive on 4 June. Later the same day, the Ministry announced 3 other new cases, also in Ras al-Ma'ara.

The Ministry of Health also announced 4 recoveries.

- The Ministry of Health said that a lockdown was imposed on Ras al-Ma'ara town to prevent the outbreak of the virus and to maintain the public health and safety.

9 June: The Ministry of Health announced 2 new cases among people who had been in contact with the infected persons in Ras al-Ma'ara town.

10 June: The Ministry of Health announced 6 recoveries. The Ministry also announced 6 new cases among people who had been in contact with the infected persons in Ras al-Ma'ara town.

11 June: The Ministry of Health announced 12 new cases among people who had been in contact with the infected persons in Ras al-Ma'ara town.

13 June:

- The Ministry of Health announced 3 recoveries. The Ministry also announced 6 new cases among people who had been in contact with the infected persons in Ras al-Ma'ara town.
- The Ministry of Health stated that among the recoveries of 13 June was the truck driver from Ras al-Ma'ara and that he was discharged from Al-Zabadani hospital after he was tested negative twice. The Ministry also said that among the new cases of 13 June was a person who lives in Kashkoul neighborhood in Damascus.

14 June:

- The Ministry of Health announced 3 recoveries.
- The Ministry of Health announced 7 cases among people who had been in contact with the infected persons in Ras al-Ma'ara town. (Note: After that, The Ministry of Health put the sources of infection of the cases as: 6 "contacted with a confirmed case", and one "came from outside the country".)
- A health official in Damascus directorate of health said that if the number of cases continues to grow, imposing a partial or full curfew is possible with the possibility of having a second wave of COVID-19 cases because of the unhealthy actions by some people who are ignoring the public health guidelines. He also said that economic damage is expected in case of a travel ban between cities and villages and that would affect both the citizens and the government.

The health official stated that a big percentage of COVID-19 patients in Syria show no symptoms. And also said that the average period until recovery of COVID-19 patients in Syria is one to three weeks.

- The Minister of Health said during an interview that the truck driver from Ras al-Ma'ara who tested positive and caused an outbreak in the town attended a wedding and that was how the outbreak started there.

15 June: The Ministry of Health announced 4 recoveries.

17 June: The Ministry of Health announced one death and said that it was of a woman in her 70s. The Ministry of Health stated that the woman had heart and blood pressure problems and was diabetic and also had kidney problems. She went to Al-Mouwasat hospital in Damascus (Note: The death was later put as a part of Quneitra Governorate's count.) after developing respiratory and digestive problems. As a result, she went into ICU, where then tested positive for COVID-19. The Ministry said that the source of her infection was still unknown and that the ministry is following the matter to isolate and test her contacts.

18 June: The Ministry of Health announced 9 new cases of COVID-19 in Quneitra Governorate of people who had contact with the woman that died the day before. The ministry said that the new cases were put in quarantine at Al-Qatana hospital.

20 June:

- The Ministry of Health announced 11 new cases; 10 of people who had contact with infected persons in Jdaydat al-Fadl in Quneitra Governorate, and one of a person who arrived from Lebanon. The Ministry also announced 5 recoveries.
- The Ministry of Health said that a lockdown was imposed on Jdeidet al-Fadl town in Quneitra Governorate after registering a number of COVID-19 cases in it, in order to prevent an outbreak of the virus and to preserve public health and safety.

21 June: The Ministry of Health announced 6 new cases of people who had contact with infected persons from Jdaydat al-Fadl in Quneitra Governorate. The Ministry said that 3 of the new cases were among members of the medical staff in Al-Mouwasat hospital and said that one of them is a student.

22 June: The Ministry of Health announced 15 new cases in Damascus and Rif Dimashq of people who had contact with known confirmed cases. The Ministry stated that the cases were found after the ministry's teams reached out to contacts of already confirmed cases and tested them and the results came back positive. The ministry said that most of them showed no symptoms and that all of them were put in proper isolation facilities to receive medical care. Local news networks said that among the new COVID-19 cases is the head of the pulmonology clinics department in Al-Mujtahid hospital in Damascus and that she was put in isolation after being tested positive. The same sources also said that the cases in Rif Dimashq were from Jdaydat Al-Fadl (Note: The Ministry of Health considers Jdaidat Al-Fadl to be a part of Quneitra Governorate.) and Qatana. The source also noted that the new cases reported in Damascus were among people who were already in quarantine.

23 June:

- The Ministry of Health announced 3 recoveries. Later the same day, 8 other recoveries were announced.
- The Ministry of Health announced 12 new cases among the 123 Syrian students that arrived from Lebanon for their exams. The ministry stated that they were in quarantine since they arrived to the country.

25 June:

- The Ministry of Health announced 11 new cases of people who had contact with known confirmed cases. And 2 recoveries.
- Local news networks reported that a patient escaped The National Hospital in Hama after being tested positive for COVID-19 and went to Damascus where authorities tracked the person and put him in quarantine in Rif Dimashq. But the official state media networks never reported that. Health officials later said that the person did not escape, but instead he thought that the doctors were done with him and that he was free to go after taking samples for the test, but when authorities tried to reach him they found out that he went to Damascus so he was quarantined there. Noting that his results did not actually come back yet.

These news came in a time when many rumors circulated, especially in the past few days, about COVID-19 cases that the government did not report in Aleppo and Hama.

26 June:

- The Ministry of Health announced 12 new cases of people who had contact with known confirmed cases. The Ministry also announced 6 recoveries.
- The Ministry of Health announced one death of a person who went to hospital because they had respiratory problems and later tested positive for COVID-19.

27 June: The Ministry of Health announced one death of a man in his 70s in Aleppo and said that he had diabetes and heart problems.

29 June: The Ministry of Health announced 13 new cases of people who had contact with known confirmed cases.

30 June: The Ministry of Health announced 3 recoveries. The Ministry also announced 10 new cases of people who had contact with known confirmed cases.

=== July 2020 ===
1 July: The Ministry of Health announced 5 recoveries. The ministry also announced 14 new cases of people who had contact with known confirmed cases.

2 July: The Ministry of Health announced 3 recoveries. The ministry also announced 19 new cases of people who had contact with known confirmed cases.

3 July: The Ministry of Health announced 10 recoveries and one new death. The ministry also announced 16 new cases of people who had contact with known confirmed cases.

4 July: The Ministry of Health announced 10 new cases of people who had contact with known confirmed cases.

5 July: The Ministry of Health announced 20 new cases of people who had contact with known confirmed cases. The ministry also announced 3 recoveries and 3 deaths.

6 July:

- The Ministry of Health announced 14 new cases of people who had contact with known confirmed cases and one death.
- Local news networks said that the death reported on 6 July is of a resident of one of the neighborhoods in Damascus who visited Al-Assad university hospital multiple times after experiencing cough and fever, and was admitted to the hospital a week ago and died a few days after. And later their COVID-19 test results came back positive.
- The Syrian Arab Red Crescent said that it immediately took the necessary health procedures as one of its volunteers in Daraa was tested positive for COVID-19. And that all activities, except for first aid, were reduced for the safety of the volunteers and everyone else.

9 July: The first case of COVID-19 was reported in rebel-held Idlib of a doctor in his 30s. But the Syrian government did not report it.

10 July: The Ministry of Health announced 22 new cases and two deaths.

11 July: Tishreen university announced that one of its employees tested positive for COVID-19, and that she was put in quarantine as well as the people that contacted with her.

12 July:

- Health officials in Al-Nour hospital in Jableh said that after a man in his 60s went into the hospital after experiencing digestive problems and COVID-19 symptoms. The man was tested positive and was moved to Al-heffa hospital. And after testing 25 people of the medical staff thad contacted with the patient it appeared that one nurse tested positive, and he was also to the same hospital.
- Aleppo university announced that one of its students in the faculty of economics test positive for COVID-19.
- Ministry of Justice announced that two Judges tested positive for COVID-19 in Damascus, the ministry said that there were also two suspected cases that showed symptoms and were put in quarantine.

13 July: The Ministry of Health announced 23 new cases, 10 recoveries, and 3 deaths.

14 July: The Ministry of Health announced 22 new cases, 2 recoveries, and 2 deaths.

15 July: The Ministry of Health announced 19 new cases, 2 recoveries, and one death.

16 July: The Ministry of Health announced 19 new cases.

17 July: The Ministry of Health announced 19 new cases, 4 recoveries, and 3 deaths.

18 July: The Ministry of Health announced that the lockdown on Jdaidet Al-Fadl town was lifted after conducting comprehensive medical swabs to assess the state of COVID-19 in the town, as the results were negative.

20 July: The Ministry of Health announced 26 new cases and 10 recoveries and 4 deaths.

21 July:

- The Ministry of Health announced 18 new cases, 6 recoveries, and two deaths.
- The Jordanian Ministry of Health announced 46 new cases in Jordan and said that 44 of them are of people who came from Syria.

22 July:

- The Ministry of Health announced 21 new cases, 5 recoveries, and one death.
- The Ministry of Endowments announced the suspension of Eid al-Adha prayers in Damascus and Rif Dimashq alongside suspending all lessons and religious councils teaching seminars.

23 July:

- The Ministry of Health announced 23 new cases, 9 recoveries, and 3 deaths.
- The Ministry of Health announced that the lockdown on Ras al-Ma'ara town was lifted after conducting comprehensive medical swabs to assess the state of COVID-19 in the town, as the results were negative.

24 July: The Ministry of Health announced 24 new cases and 10 recoveries.

25 July: The Ministry of Health announced 19 new cases, 10 recoveries, and one death.

26 July: The Ministry of Health announced 23 new cases, 9 recoveries, and 2 deaths.

27 July: The Ministry of Health announced 24 new cases, 10 recoveries, and 2 deaths.

28 July: The Ministry of Health announced 20 new cases and 10 recoveries.

29 July: The Ministry of Health announced 23 new cases and 9 recoveries.

30 July:

- The Ministry of health said in a statement that it does not have the capability to do widespread PCR testing, affirming the belief that the number of confirmed cases does not reflect the real status of COVID-19 in Syria.
- The Ministry of Health announced 21 new cases and one death.
- The Directorate of Health in As-Suweyda said that the number of COVID-19 cases in the governorate is 24, with 19 recoveries and 3 deaths. But the official website of the Ministry of Health for COVID-19 cases still showed As-Suweyda with 16 cases, two recoveries, and one death.

31 July: The Ministry of Health announced 19 new cases, 8 recoveries, and two deaths.

=== August 2020 ===
1 August: The Ministry of Health announced 23 new cases and 9 recoveries.

2 August: The Ministry of Health announced 29 new cases, 10 recoveries, and one death.

3 August: The Ministry of Health announced 38 new cases, 12 recoveries, and two deaths.

4 August: The Ministry of Health announced 45 new cases and 15 recoveries.

5 August: The Ministry of Health announced 52 new cases, 13 recoveries, and two deaths.

6 August: The Ministry of Health announced 55 new cases and 15 recoveries.

7 August: The Ministry of Health announced 61 new cases.

8 August: The Ministry of Health announced 65 new cases, 20 recoveries, and two deaths.

9 August: The Ministry of Health announced 63 new cases, 15 recoveries, and two deaths.

10 August: The Ministry of Health announced 67 new cases and 18 recoveries. Of the reported cases, Seven were in Hasaka Governorate; making it the first time the government reports cases in the governorate.

11 August: The Ministry of Health announced 72 new cases, 21 recoveries, and one death.

13 August: The Ministry of Health announced 105 new cases (Highest single-day number reported), 10 recoveries, and two deaths.

14 August: The Ministry of Health announced 83 new cases, 8 recoveries, and 3 deaths.

15 August: The Ministry of Health announced 78 new cases, 5 recoveries, and two deaths.

16 August: The Ministry of Health announced 84 new cases, 9 recoveries, and 4 deaths.

17 August: The Ministry of Health announced 87 new cases, 8 recoveries, and 4 deaths.

18 August: The Ministry of Health announced 80 new cases, 6 recoveries, and 5 deaths.

19 August: The Ministry of Health announced 83 new cases, 14 recoveries, and 5 deaths.

20 August: The Ministry of Health announced 81 new cases, 15 recoveries, and 4 deaths.

21 August: The Ministry of Health announced 65 new cases, 15 recoveries, and one death.

22 August: The Ministry of Health announced 70 new cases, 15 recoveries, and two deaths.

23 August: The Ministry of Health announced 74 new cases, 15 recoveries, and 4 deaths.

24 August: The Ministry of Health announced 76 new cases, 14 recoveries, and 3 deaths.

25 August: The Ministry of Health announced 72 new cases, 14 recoveries, and 3 deaths.

26 August: The Ministry of Health announced 75 new cases, 17 recoveries, and 3 deaths.

27 August: The Ministry of Health announced 64 new cases, 19 recoveries, and two deaths.

28 August: The Ministry of Health announced 59 new cases, 15 recoveries, and 3 deaths.

29 August: The Ministry of Health announced 65 new cases, 15 recoveries, and 3 deaths.

30 August: The Ministry of Health announced 75 new cases, 15 recoveries, and 3 deaths.

31 August: The Ministry of Health announced 62 new cases, 15 recoveries, and 3 deaths.

=== September 2020 ===
1 September: The Ministry of Health announced 65 new cases, 17 recoveries, and 4 deaths.

2 September: The Ministry of Health announced 68 new cases, 15 recoveries, and 4 deaths.

3 September:

- The Ministry of Health announced 75 new cases, 20 recoveries, and 4 deaths.
- Former Agriculture and Agrarian Reform Minister Ahmed Al-Qadri died from COVID-19, making him the first Syrian government official to die from COVID-19 during the pandemic.

4 September: The Ministry of Health announced 68 new cases, 17 recoveries, and 3 deaths.

5 September: The Ministry of Health announced 63 new cases, 17 recoveries, and 3 deaths.

6 September: The Ministry of Health announced 67 new cases, 15 recoveries, and 4 deaths.

7 September: The Ministry of Health announced 58 new cases, 14 recoveries, and 3 deaths.

8 September: The Ministry of Health announced 60 new cases, 16 recoveries, and 3 deaths.

9 September: The Ministry of Health announced 62 new cases, 20 recoveries, and 3 deaths.

10 September: The Ministry of Health announced 65 new cases, 17 recoveries, and 4 deaths.

11 September: The Ministry of Health announced 60 new cases, 15 recoveries, and 3 deaths.

12 September: The Ministry of Health announced 30 new cases, 15 recoveries, and two deaths.

13 September:

- The Ministry of Health announced 34 new cases, 15 recoveries, and 3 deaths.
- Nearly 3.7 million students go back to schools.

14 September: The Ministry of Health announced 36 new cases, 16 recoveries, and two deaths.

15 September: The Ministry of Health announced 38 new cases, 13 recoveries, and 3 deaths.

16 September: The Ministry of Health announced 40 new cases, 18 recoveries, and 3 deaths.

17 September: The Ministry of Health announced 37 new cases, 14 recoveries, and two deaths.

18 September: The Ministry of Health announced 40 new cases, 15 recoveries, and 3 deaths.

19 September: The Ministry of Health announced 34 new cases, 14 recoveries, and two deaths.

20 September:

- The Ministry of Health announced 35 new cases, 14 recoveries, and two deaths.
- An official in the Ministry of Education said that the Ministry was informed that a fifth grade female student (11 years) in a school in Damascus tested positive for COVID-19 after experiencing respiratory symptoms. The official said that the infection came to the student from outside the school because she has been experiencing symptoms since the week before schools opening, in addition to the student having confirmed COVID-19 cases in her family. The official added that the student's sister was also experiencing symptoms. And proper measures were taken regarding the class and the teacher.

21 September: The Ministry of Health announced 33 new cases, 17 recoveries, and 3 deaths.

22 September: The Ministry of Health announced 44 new cases, 20 recoveries, and 3 deaths.

23 September: The Ministry of Health announced 47 new cases, 15 recoveries, and 3 deaths.

24 September: The Ministry of Health announced 42 new cases, 15 recoveries, and two deaths.

25 September: The Ministry of Health announced 35 new cases, 15 recoveries, and two deaths.

26 September: The Ministry of Health announced 37 new cases, 20 recoveries, and 3 deaths.

27 September: The Ministry of Health announced 34 new cases, 14 recoveries, and 4 deaths.

28 September: The Ministry of Health announced 30 new cases, 12 recoveries, and two deaths.

29 September: The Ministry of Health announced 46 new cases, 14 recoveries, and 3 deaths.

30 September: The Ministry of Health announced 52 new cases, 15 recoveries, and 3 deaths.

=== October 2020 ===
1 October: The Ministry of Health announced 47 new cases, 14 recoveries, and two deaths.

2 October: The Ministry of Health announced 42 new cases, 13 recoveries, and one death.

3 October: The Ministry of Health announced 40 new cases, 13 recoveries, and one death.

4 October: The Ministry of Health announced 37 new cases, 12 recoveries, and one death.

5 October: The Ministry of Health announced 45 new cases, 13 recoveries, and two deaths.

6 October: The Ministry of Health announced 46 new cases, 15 recoveries, and two deaths.

7 October: The Ministry of Health announced 47 new cases, 15 recoveries, and 3 deaths.

8 October: The Ministry of Health announced 62 new cases, 14 recoveries, and 3 deaths.

9 October: The Ministry of Health announced 50 new cases, 23 recoveries, and 3 deaths.

10 October: The Ministry of Health announced 57 new cases, 36 recoveries, and 3 deaths.

11 October: The Ministry of Health announced 45 new cases, 25 recoveries, and 3 deaths.

12 October: The Ministry of Health announced 56 new cases, 35 recoveries, and 4 deaths.

13 October: The Ministry of Health announced 52 new cases, 33 recoveries, and 3 deaths.

14 October: The Ministry of Health announced 57 new cases, 25 recoveries, and 3 deaths.

15 October: The Ministry of Health announced 48 new cases, 36 recoveries, and 4 deaths.

=== March 2021 ===
In March 2021, World Health Organization said that it is planning to vaccinate 20% of the Syrian population by the end of 2021, noting that around 224000 AstraZeneca vaccines will arrive from India and 912000 others will arrive later.

=== April 2021 ===
On 22 April, more than 256,800 doses of the AstraZeneca COVID-19 vaccine arrived in Syria under the United Nations COVAX program. These doses are aimed at inoculating the country's frontline health workers.

== Confirmed cases ==
=== Charts ===
Confirmed new cases per day

Confirmed deaths per day

=== COVID-19 Cases in Syrian Governorates ===
COVID-19 Cases in Syrian Governorates _{(Only cases reported by government - see notes)}
Governorate	Reported Cases	Recoveries	Deaths	Active Cases
Damascus	11,326	10,425	901	0
Aleppo^{(Note: Excluding cases that were reported in the Kurdish-led region of Rojava but were not officially reported by the Syrian government. (Cases mentioned further down in this section).)}	8,816	8,803	510	0
Latakia	9,888	9,456	432	0
Homs	6,175	5,808	367	0
Rif Dimashq	5,281	5,229	52	0
Tartus	4,073	3,796	277	0
Daraa	3,312	3,178	134	0
Hama	2,280	2,799	81	0
As-Suwayda	3,058	2,799	259	0
Quneitra^{(Note: Excluding cases in the Israeli-controlled disputed Golan Heights.)}	1,006	973	33	0
Deir ez-Zor	842	729	113	0
Hasaka	1,054	1,050	4	0
Raqqa	25	23	2	0
Idlib^{(Note: Excluding cases that were reported in the rebel-held territory in Idlib but were not officially reported by the Syrian government. (Cases mentioned further down in this section))}	7	7	0	0
Total	57,743	54,578	3,165	0

As per the final update by the Ministry of Health, 26 August 2023.

=== Cases by source of the virus ===
COVID-19 cases in Syria by source of infection
Source of infection	Cases
Source of infection unknown	11,699
Work Place Infection	516
Had contact with a confirmed case	276
Came from outside the country	169

Information by the Ministry of Health as of 20 February 2020.

=== Confirmed cases not included in the official count ===
- A 53-year-old male resident of Syria's Kurdish-administered northeast died in early April of COVID-19, according to an email from the World Health Organization (WHO) obtained by The Associated Press on 17 April. The death in the city of Qamishli was not reported by the Syrian government, and is the first to be traced back to the northeast, a region that has restricted access to outside assistance and where testing capabilities are unavailable. It is not clear why the death, although reported to WHO, was not added to the Syrian government's official tally. The man, who had no travel history outside the country, died in a government-run hospital in Qamishli and was tested positive in a Damascus government lab (the results came back the same day he died), but Kurdish authorities in the region were not notified.

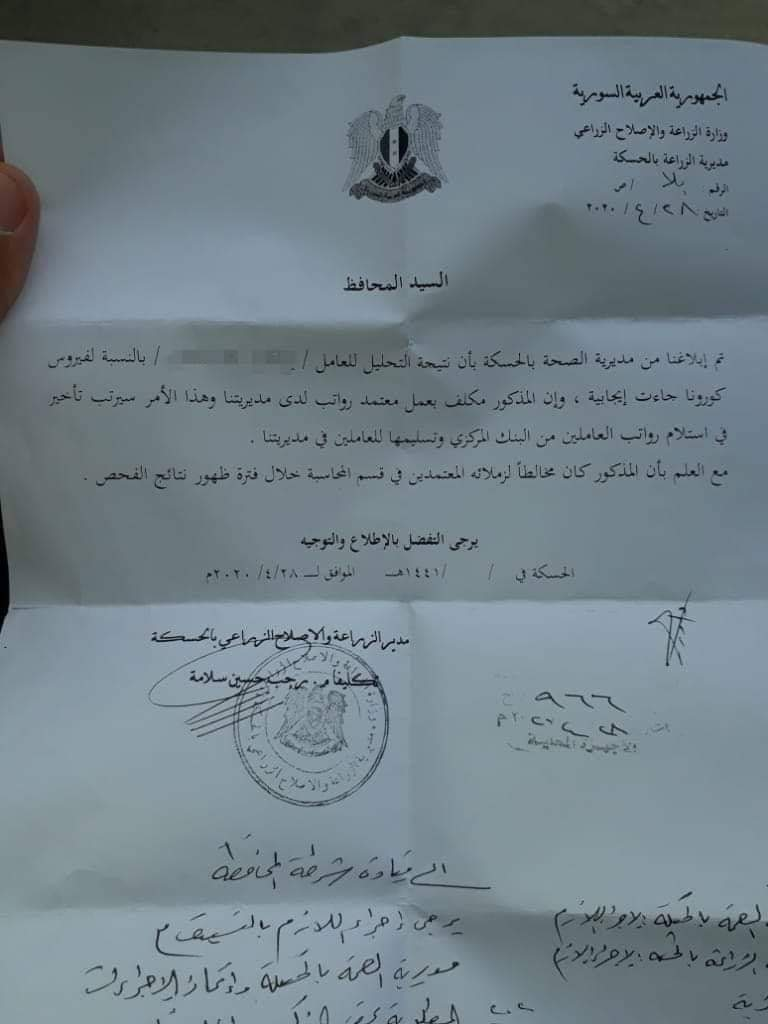
The alleged document that Hasaka's director of agriculture is supposedly informing the governor that the results of a COVID-19 test for an employee there came back positive.

- On 28 April, an image of a document claimed to be from Hasaka's official Directorate of Agriculture circulated on the internet. In the document, the director of agriculture is supposedly informing Hasaka's governor that the results of a COVID-19 test for an employee in the directorate came back positive and that the employee's job was accounting and handing employees their monthly salaries, and that he had contact with many people and co-workers at a time when he was believed to have the virus. But the employee's case was not added to the Syrian government's official COVID-19 cases count.
- A doctor in his 30s working at Bab al-Hawa hospital in Idlib near the Turkish border was tested positive on 9 July after he experienced symptoms and asked to be tested. But the Syrian government did not report the case because it was in rebel-held territory. Two more cases were registered in rebel-held Idlib the next day. later, the number of cases reached 4.
- News networks reported that the Autonomous Administration of North and East Syria reported four cases; three in Qamishli and one Al-Hasakah.
- On 4 August, some local news networks said that the number of cases in the Kurdish-led northeastern region of Rojava has reached 54 including cases in Aleppo Governorate.
- By November 2020, 8,139 cases were reported in Opposition held areas northwest Syria, and 3,948 cases were reported in Autonomous Administration of North and East Syria.

== Resources and facilities ==
=== Testing ===
During July and going through August, many individuals and organizations saw that the government has lost control over the COVID-19 situation. The Ministry of Health itself said many times that its testing capabilities are not enough, and that many asymptomatic and symptomatic cases may go unnoticed because it was not possible to do widespread or random testing. Many local news networks and organizations said that hospitals are even refusing to admit patients with mild symptoms, and only accept those who need critical and intensive care. Some hospitals announced in early August that they have no more places for COVID-19 patients to be admitted, and asked anyone who suspects of being infected to self-quarantine at home instead of going to hospital. The Syrian government claims that the ongoing civil war, combined with the economic situation in Syria and sanctions by western governments, limit the capacity in which adequate COVID-19 PCR tests can be conducted and prevent vital supplies for treating and managing the pandemic from being imported. Health care professionals claimed the country was overwhelmed by cases and that the government had engaged in an intimidation campaign to suppress information of the outbreak.

According to Human Rights Watch, the Syrian government failed to protect health workers at the front line of coronavirus disease (COVID-19) in the government-held territory. WHO has provided the Syrian government with 4.4 million items of PPE, including medical and respirator masks, gloves. However, doctors and nurses operating in government-held areas said that there were still severe shortages of supplies, particularly in rural areas.

According to the Syrian Ministry of Health per its final update on 26 August 2023, there were 9 labs that are able to test for the coronavirus located in eight governorates.

=== Institutional quarantine ===
According to the Syrian Ministry of Health (updated 2020), there were 33 quarantine centers for suspected COVID-19 cases located in 13 governorates (All governorates Except Idlib).

=== Treatment centers ===
According to the Syrian Ministry of Health per its final update on 26 August 2023. there were 151 Treatment centers dedicated for COVID-19 patients located in 12 governorates:

- 33 in Homs.
- 28 in Aleppo.
- 24 in Latakia.
- 22 in Damascus
- 12 in Rif Dimashq
- 11 in Hama
- 7 in As-Suwayda
- 5 in Hasaka
- 5 in Tartus
- 2 in Daraa
- 1 in Quneitra
- 1 in Deir ez-Zor

== Quarantine and isolation ==
According to the state media organization SANA, the Ministry of Health started quarantining suspected cases and people coming from outside the country in free-of-charge dedicated quarantine facilities from 5 February 2020.

Quarantined cases in Syrian governorates
Governorate	People still in quarantine	Discharged from quarantine	Total
Rif Dimashq	0	13,895	13,895
Homs	0	2,037	2,037
Damascus	0	1.925	1,925
Aleppo	0	1,408	1,408
Hama	0	1,261	1,261
Tartus	0	957	957
Hasaka	0	750	750
As-Suwayda	0	555	555
Latakia	0	478	478
Deir ez-Zor	0	357	357
Quneitra	0	267	267
Daraa	0	194	194
Raqqa	0	70	70
Idlib	_{No quarantine centers}	–	–
Total	0	24,154	24,154

Information from the Ministry of Health as of 25 September.
