= Syrian governors =

Syrian governors may refer to:

- List of governors of Damascus
- List of governors of Aleppo
- List of governors of Homs Governorate

== See also ==
- List of Roman governors of Syria
