= Abdul Rahman Salama =

Syrian politician and businessman (born 1971)

- عبد الرحمن سلامة
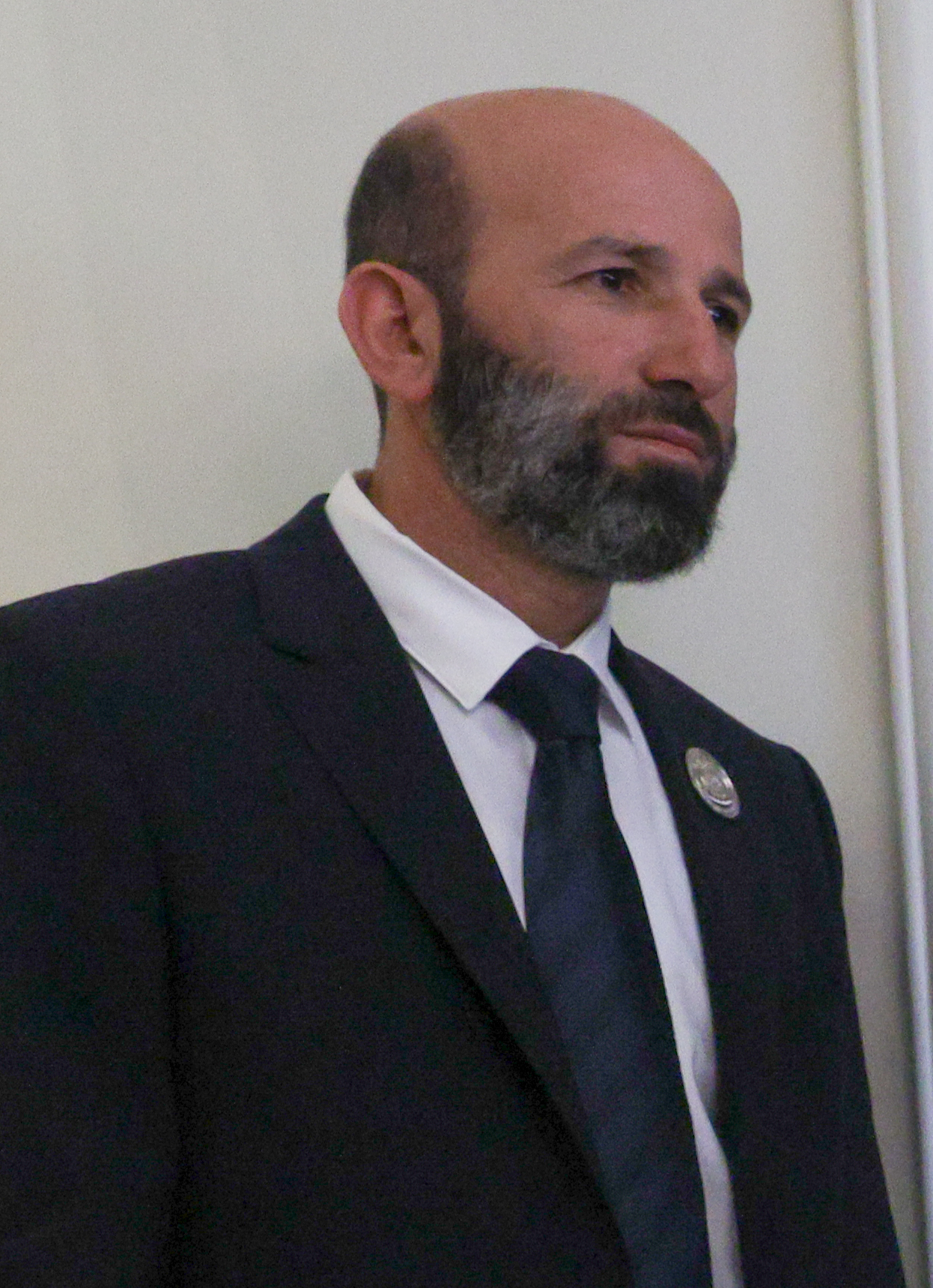
- Salama in 2025

Governor of Raqqa
- Incumbent
- Assumed office 19 January 2026
- President: Ahmed al-Sharaa
- Preceded by: Abdul Razzaq Khalifa

Secretary-General to the Presidency
- In office 29 January 2025 – 5 April 2025
- President: Ahmed al-Sharaa
- Succeeded by: Maher al-Sharaa

Personal details
- Born: 1971 (age 54–55) Anadan, Aleppo Governorate, Syria
- Party: Independent (since 2025)
- Other political affiliations: Hay'at Tahrir al-Sham (until 2025)
- Profession: Politician; Entrepreneur
- Nickname: Abu Ibrahim

Military service
- Allegiance: Syria (since 2024); Formerly: Al-Nusra Front (2012–2016); Jabhat Fateh al-Sham (2016–2017); Hay'at Tahrir al-Sham (2017–2025); Syrian Salvation Government (2017–2024)
- Battles/wars: Syrian civil war; Battle of Aleppo (2012–2016); Inter-rebel conflict during the Syrian civil war

Abdul Rahman Salama (Note: Arabic: عبد الرحمن سلامة) (born 1971), also known by his nom de guerre Abu Ibrahim, is a Syrian politician, businessman, and former military commander who has served as Governor of Raqqa Governorate since 2026. He previously served as Secretary-General to the Presidency.

Born in Anadan, Aleppo Governorate, Syria, Salama worked as a partner at a stone quarry before the Syrian revolution. He began participating in the rebellion at the end of 2011 and later joined the Al-Nusra Front, serving as its emir in Aleppo in 2012. After the fall of Aleppo, he became the leader of Liwa Omar bin al-Khattab, a group affiliated with Hay'at Tahrir al-Sham (HTS). While leading Liwa Omar bin al-Khattab, he disagreed with Abu al-Abd Ashidaa's criticism of HTS and was subsequently appointed by Ahmed al-Sharaa as the leader of the Northern Factions.

Aside from his role as a militant leader, Salama also worked as an entrepreneur. In 2020, he founded the construction company Al-Raqi, which participated in several infrastructure projects in northern Syria. During his leadership, Al-Raqi contributed significantly to boosting the economy of Idlib City under HTS control before the Assad regime collapsed. After the fall of the Assad regime, Salama served as Secretary-General to the Presidency until he was replaced by Maher al-Sharaa. Salama was appointed governor of Raqqa on 19 January 2026, following the northeastern government offensive and subsequent withdrawal of the Syrian Democratic Forces from Raqqa.

== Biography ==
Abdul Rahman Salama was born in Anadan, Aleppo Governorate, Syria, in 1971. Before the Syrian revolution, he worked as a partner in a stone quarry. Salama's relative, Abdul Aziz Salama, once served as a commander of Liwa al-Tawhid and Islamic Front who later joined Levant Front. His cousin, Ibrahim Salama, served in the Ministry of Education within the Syrian Salvation Government.

== Career ==
=== Revolution era ===
Salama began participating in the rebellion at the end of 2011 when he joined the Syrian opposition. He then joined Al-Nusra Front and served as its emir in 2012 in Aleppo. After the fall of Aleppo, he became the leader of Liwa Omar bin al-Khattab, a Hay'at Tahrir al-Sham (HTS)–affiliated group. While serving at Liwa Omar bin al-Khattab, he expressed disagreement with Abu al-Abd Ashidaa's criticism towards HTS and was appointed by Ahmed al-Sharaa as the leader of Northern Factions. In 2018, he reportedly lived in Anadan. He fought against regime soldiers in the Aleppo countryside and has escaped two assassination attempts.

Apart from being the leader of an armed group, Salama also worked as an entrepreneur. He founded a construction company, Al-Raqi, in 2020. Under his leadership, Al-Raqi participated in several infrastructure projects in northern Syria. Moreover, the company involved in restoring the economic activity of Idlib before the collapse of the Assad regime. His company was accused of monopolizing Idlib's investment market by excluding competitors while securing road construction and reconstruction contracts, including housing projects affiliated with Turkey's Disaster and Emergency Management Presidency.

=== Syrian transitional government ===
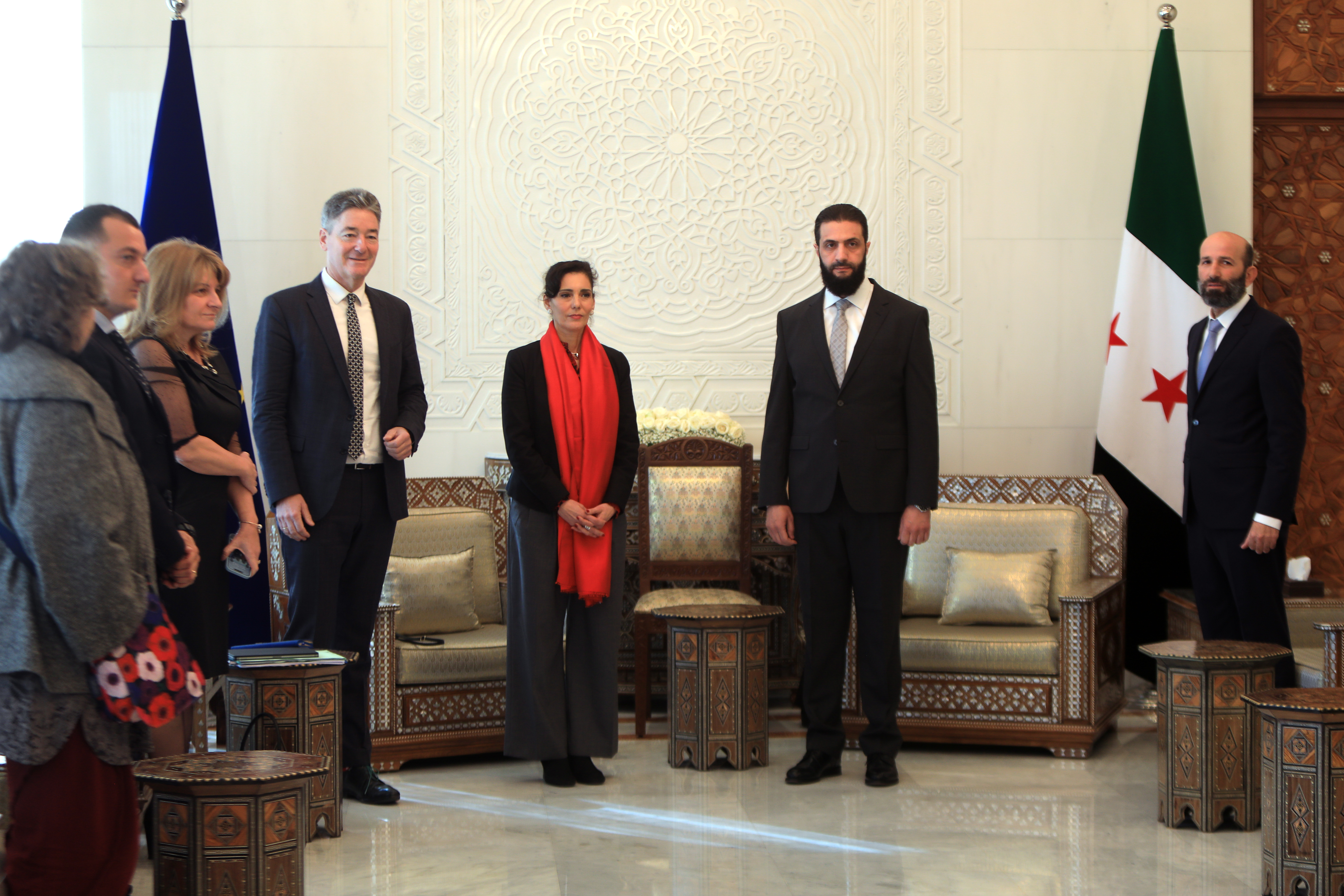
Salama (right) with then–de facto leader Ahmed al-Sharaa, who later became president, and European Commissioner for Preparedness and Crisis Management Hadja Lahbib (center), January 2025.

Since the fall of the Assad regime, Salama has appeared on numerous occasions alongside Syrian President Ahmed al-Sharaa, despite holding no official position, accompanying him on trips to Saudi Arabia and Turkey and appearing several times at the People's Palace. Salama is widely regarded as a close associate of al-Sharaa.

Upon the fall of the Assad regime, Salama served as the Secretary-General to the Presidency until he was replaced by Maher al-Sharaa due to his disagreement with Maher and Hazem al-Sharaa on economic and administrative issues. Salama's public appearance with al-Sharaa took place at the reception for German Foreign Minister Annalena Baerbock on 20 March 2025. After he stepped down as Secretary-General to the Presidency, Azzam al-Gharib appointed Salama as Deputy Supervisor of the Northern and Eastern Aleppo Countryside on 24 April 2025.

=== Governor of Raqqa ===
Salama was appointed governor of Raqqa on 19 January 2026, following government offensives and the withdrawal of the Syrian Democratic Forces (SDF) from the city. The SDF had controlled Raqqa since seizing it from Islamic State (IS) in 2017 with the support of the international coalition. The governor of Aleppo, Azzam al-Gharib, announced the appointment, stating that Salama had assumed the position of governor of Raqqa. After he became governor, Salama and Syrian Minister of Information Hamza al-Mustafa conducted a field tour of the city of Raqqa the next day, focusing on evaluating service delivery and humanitarian conditions following the city's liberation from the SDF. Salama said up to 2,000 detainees were being held at al-Aqtan, but it was not immediately clear how many were linked to IS.

On 25 January, Syrian Minister of Economy and Industry Mohammad Nidal al-Shaar visited Raqqa, where he met with Salama to discuss ways to enhance economic development in the province. On 27 January, Salama stated that preparations were ongoing, in coordination with the relevant authorities, for the rehabilitation and maintenance of the Mansour Bridge. He also noted that a comprehensive study was underway to rehabilitate educational institutions, including schools and universities, as well as key infrastructure in the health and development sectors. On 19 February, Syrian Minister of Administrative Development Mohammad Skaf met with Salama to discuss plans aimed at improving public administration and enhancing the readiness of local institutions to implement reform measures. On 6 March, Syrian Health Minister Musaab Nazzal al-Ali met with Salama to review healthcare services in the governorate and discuss ways to enhance medical care and strengthen the readiness of health facilities.
