= Borisoglebsk State Pedagogical Institute =

- Борисоглебский государственный педагогический институт
- Active: 1952–2014
- Location: Borisoglebsk, Russia
- Language: Russian

Borisoglebsk State Pedagogical Institute (Russian: Борисоглебский государственный педагогический институт) is a higher education institution in Borisoglebsk that existed from 1952 to 2014, when it merged with Voronezh State University.

== History ==
Borisoglebsk State Pedagogical Institute was established in accordance with the Decree of the Council of Ministers of the USSR of 11 August 1952 No. 3692 and the order of the Ministry of Education of the RSFSR of 2 September 1952 No. 655 through the reorganization of the Borisoglebsk Teachers' Institute. In 2002, the institute was renamed into the state educational institution of higher professional education "Borisoglebsk State Pedagogical Institute". On 17 July 2014, the Borisoglebsk State Pedagogical Institute became part of the Voronezh State University as a separate structural unit - the Borisoglebsk branch of the Voronezh State University (abbreviated name of the BF Voronezh State University).

== Literature ==
- Воронежская энциклопедия: В 2 т. / Гл. ред. М. Д. Карпачёв. — Воронеж: Центр духовного возрождения Чернозёмного края, 2008. — Т.1: А—М. — 524 с., ил., карты. ISBN 978-5-900270-99-9
