= Hassan al-Ghabbash =

Syrian politician and doctor

HE Hassan al-Ghabbash حَسَن الْغَبَّاش MD

Minister of Health
- In office 30 August 2020 – 23 September 2024
- President: Bashar al-Assad
- Prime Minister: Hussein Arnous
- Preceded by: Nizar Yazigi
- Succeeded by: Ahmad Damiriyah

Personal details
- Born: 1971 (age 54–55) Damascus, Damascus Governorate, Syria
- Children: 2
- Education: University of Damascus
- Profession: Politician, Scientist, Medical Doctor

Hassan al-Ghabbash (Arabic: حَسَن الْغَبَّاش) (born 1971) is a Syrian doctor and politician. He was the Health Minister between 2020 and 2024.

== Education and career ==
- 1998: Graduated from Faculty of Medicine of Damascus University
- 1998–2002: Otolaryngologist (ORL–H&N) in al-Mouwasat University Hospital
- 2003: Member of the American Academy of ear, nose and throat disease (ORL)
- 2003–2020: Specialist supervisor doctor at al-Mouwasat University Hospital
- 2014–2017: Head of the Syrian Association of Otorhinolaryngology doctors
- 2017: Member of the Syrian Board and Chairman of the Training Committee for ORL diseases
- 2019: Head of Damascus Doctors Syndicate
- 2020–present: Minister of Health, he has been responding to the COVID-19 pandemic in Syria.
- 2021: Elected to the Executive Council of World Health Organization

== Personal life ==
He is married and has two children.

== See also ==
- Cabinet of Syria
- Second Hussein Arnous government
