= Svitlana Bilyayeva =

Archaeologist from North Ossetia

- Світлана Олександрівна Біляєва
- Born: 28 March 1946 (age 80); Dzaoudzhau, North Ossetia
- Education: Voronezh State University
- Occupations: Leading researcher at the Institute of Archeology, NAS of Ukraine

Svitlana Oleksandrivna Bilyayeva (Ukrainian: Світлана Олександрівна Біляєва, born 28 March 1946) is an archaeologist, who specialises in the ancient and medieval history of Ukraine, the Golden Horde and the Ottoman Empire.

== Biography ==
Bilyayeva was born on 28 March 1946 in Dzaudzhikau in North Ossetia.

=== Career and education ===
She studied history at Voronezh State University from 1964, graduating in 1969. From 1969 to 1981 she worked as a researched at the Institute of Archaeology in Ukraine. In 1978 she was awarded a Masters, with a dissertation on the archaeology of "South Russian lands in the second half of the 13th-14th centuries". From 1981 to 1987 she was the Scientific Secretary of the Institute of Archaeology. From 1987 to 1996 she was a senior researcher at the institute. In 2012 she was awarded a PhD in Archaeology for her research on "Relations between East Slavic and Turkic worlds in XIII-XVIII centuries". Since 2013 she was worked as a lecturer at the National Academy of Sciences of Ukraine. She is Professor of History at Pavlo Tychyna Uman State Pedagogical University.

Bilyayeva is on several academic and heritage boards, including: the Ukrainian UNESCO Committee, the editorial board for "Сходознавство" ("The Oriental Studies") published by NAS Ukraine,

=== Research ===
Bilyayeva has worked extensively on the excavations at Akkerman (Bilhorod-Dnistrovskyi) and synthesised archaeological and historical data from there. From 2006 to 2010 she was director of the Akkerman Fortress Project. She led excavations into a previously unknown 14th century Lithuanian city near the village of Tyaginka in the Beryslav region, which was sited upon the previous settlement of the Golden Horde. She has led research into the Tyagin fortress, which was the southernmost defensive structure of the Grand Duchy of Lithuania. She has excavated and researched Ottoman monuments in Ukraine, including at Ochakiv (Özü).

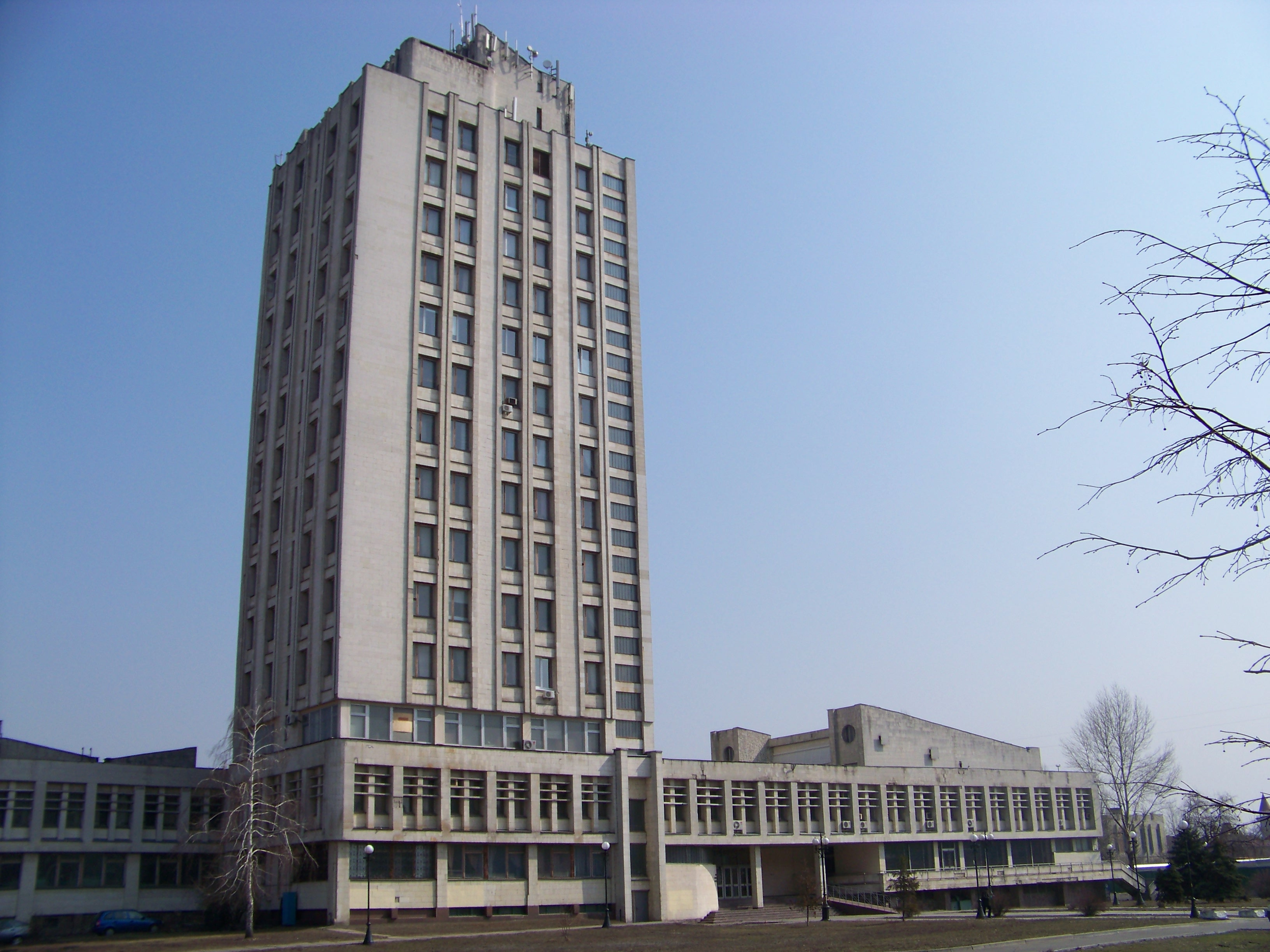
Institute of Archaeology NASU

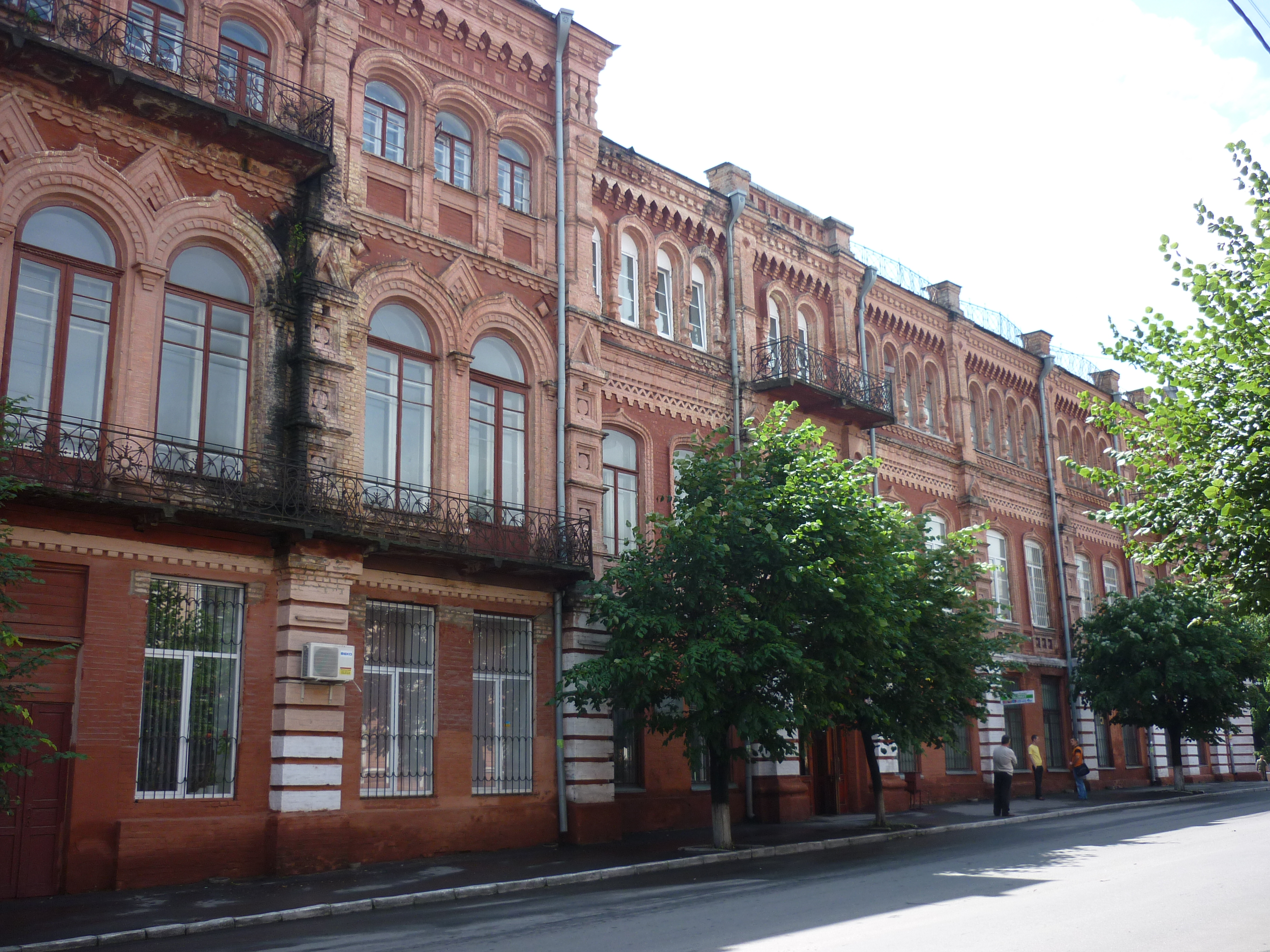
Pavlo Tychyna Uman State University

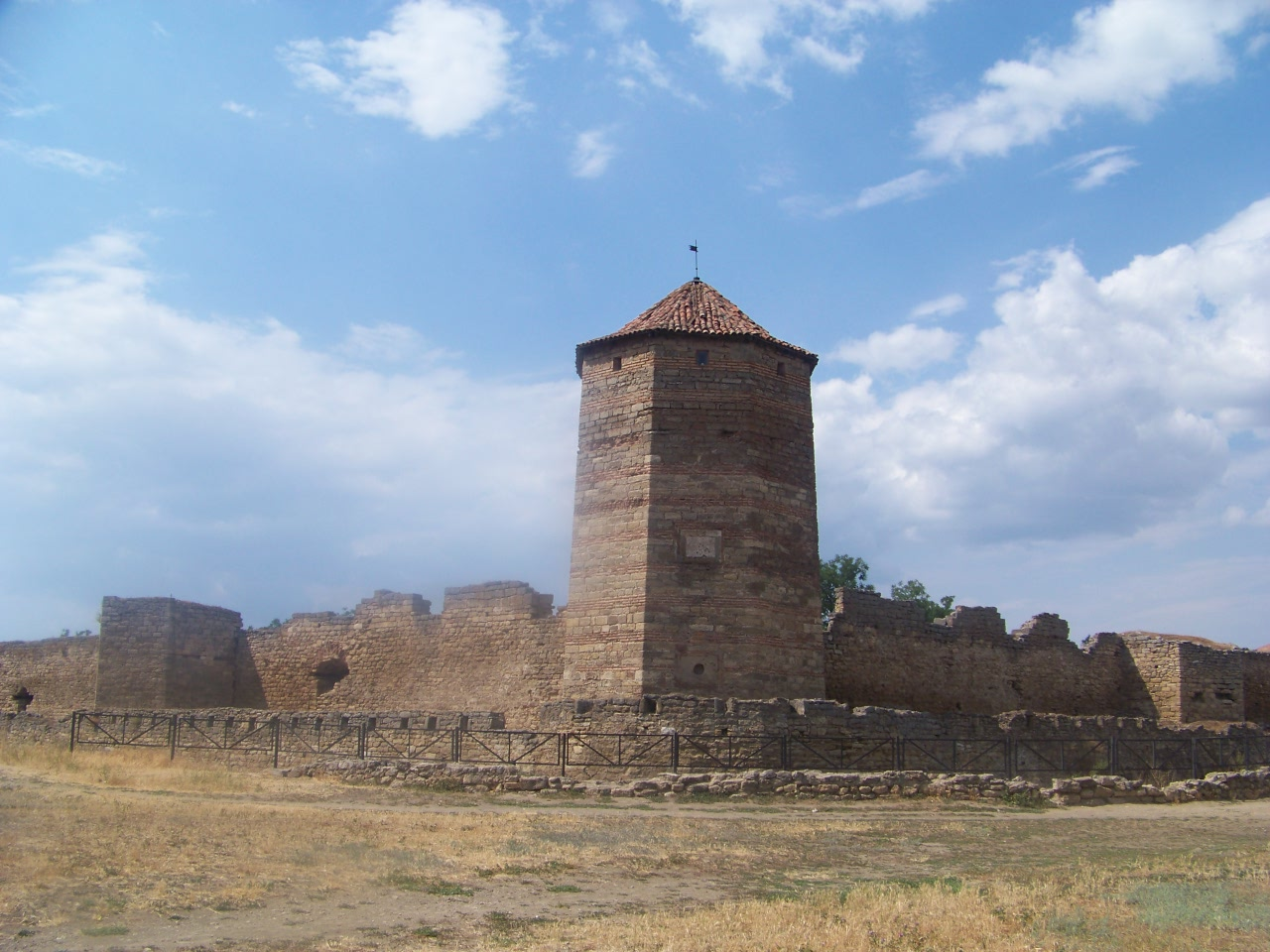
Akkerman Fortress

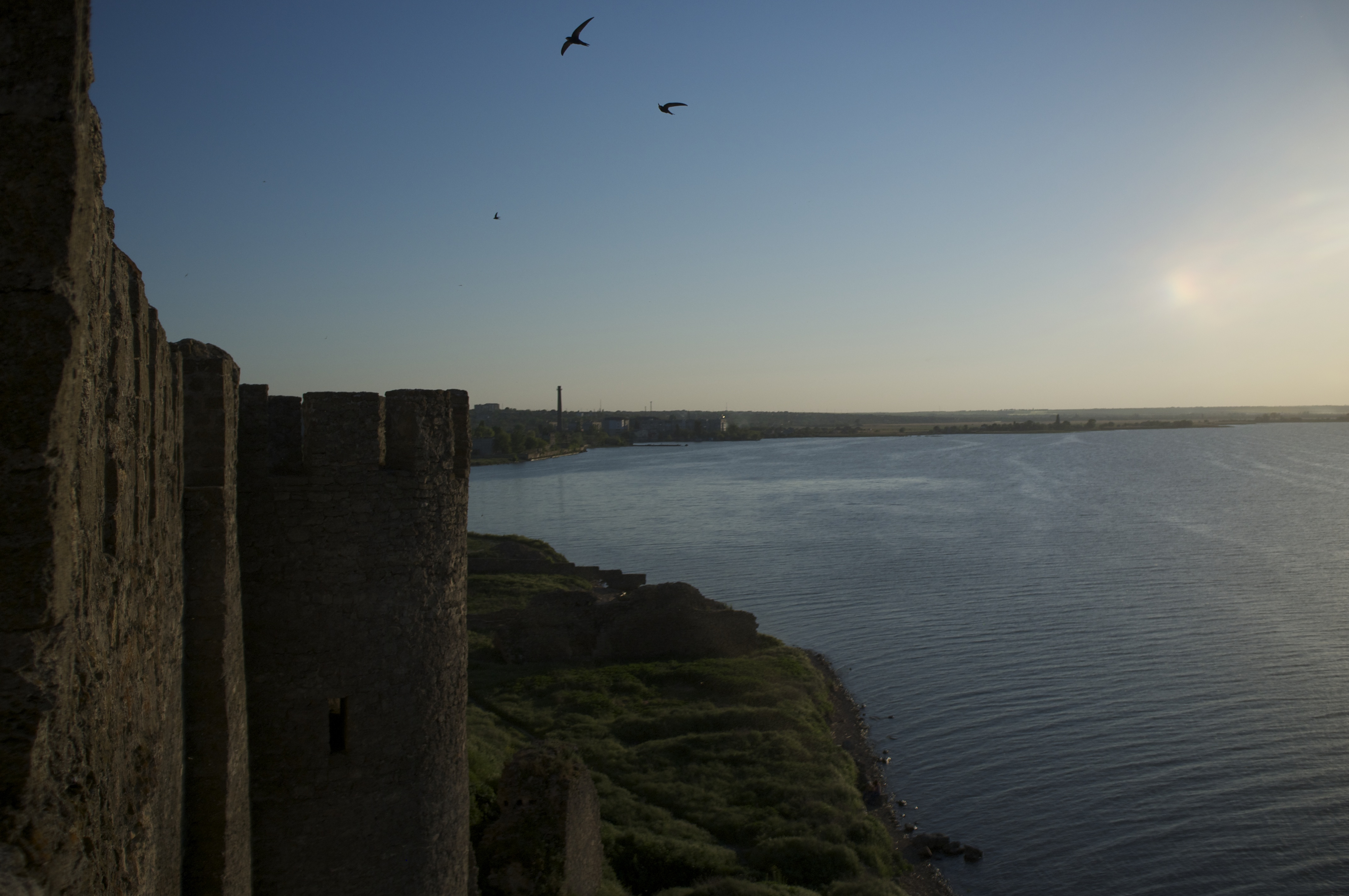
Akkerman Fortress

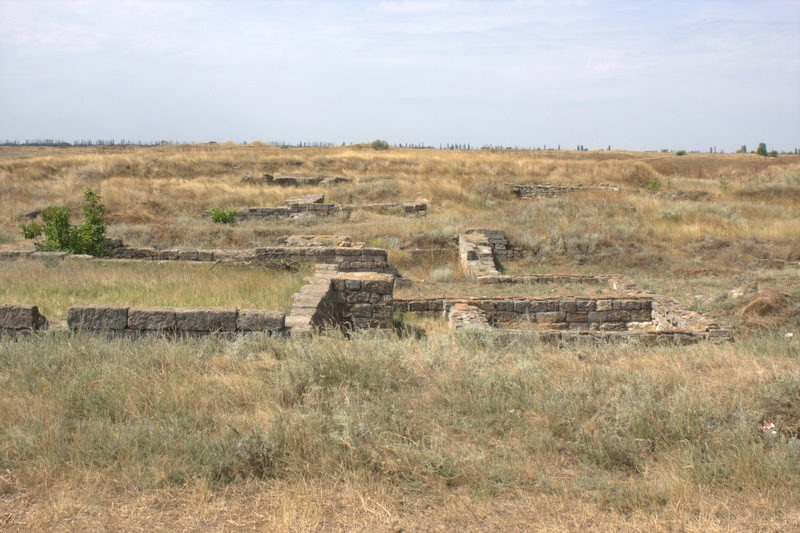
Ochakivsky District Archaeology

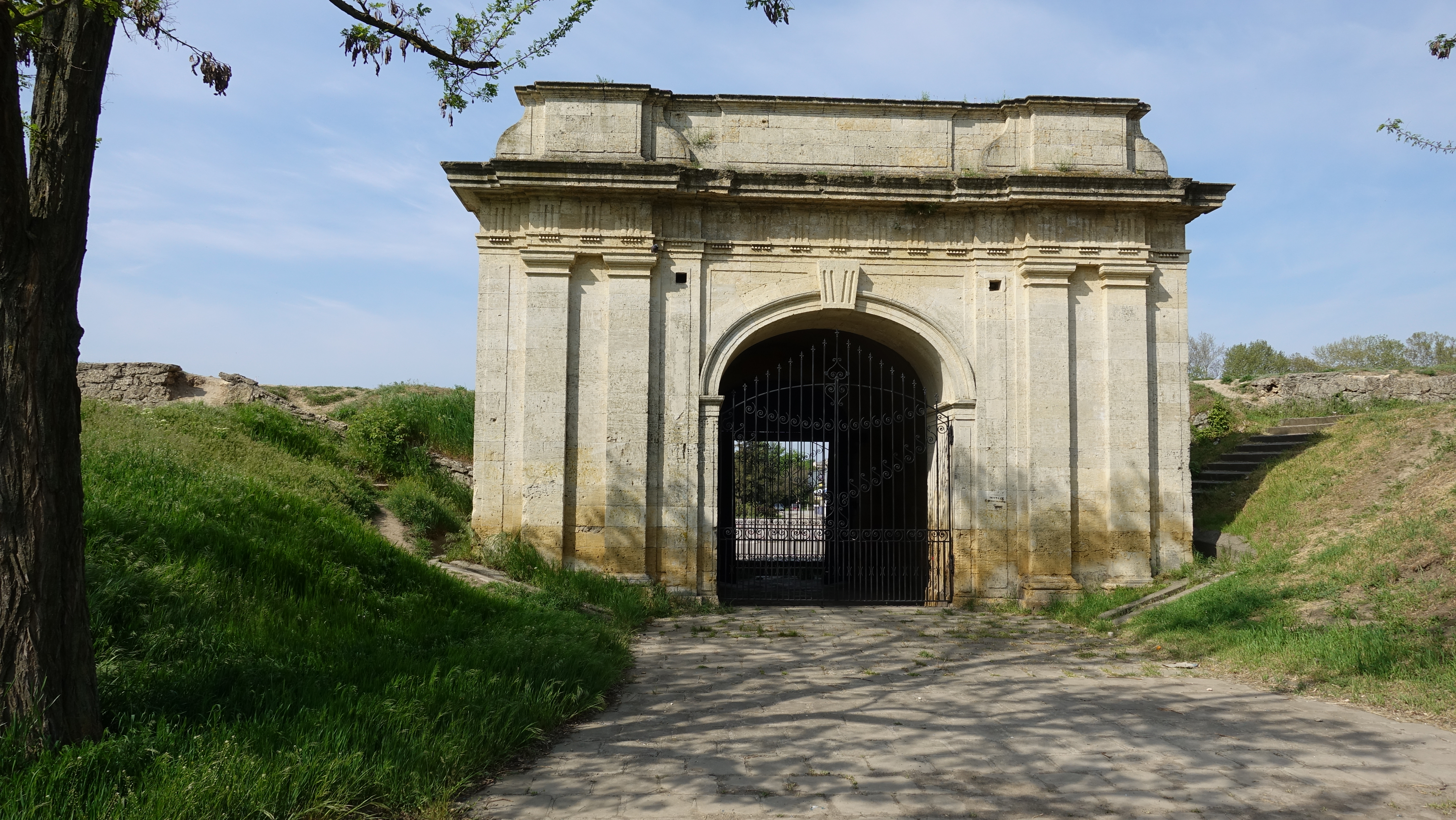
Ochakov, where Bilyayeva also led investigations
