= Voronezh State Medical University named after N. N. Burdenko =

Burdenko Voronezh State Medical University
- Воронежский государственный медицинский университет имени Н. Н. Бурденко
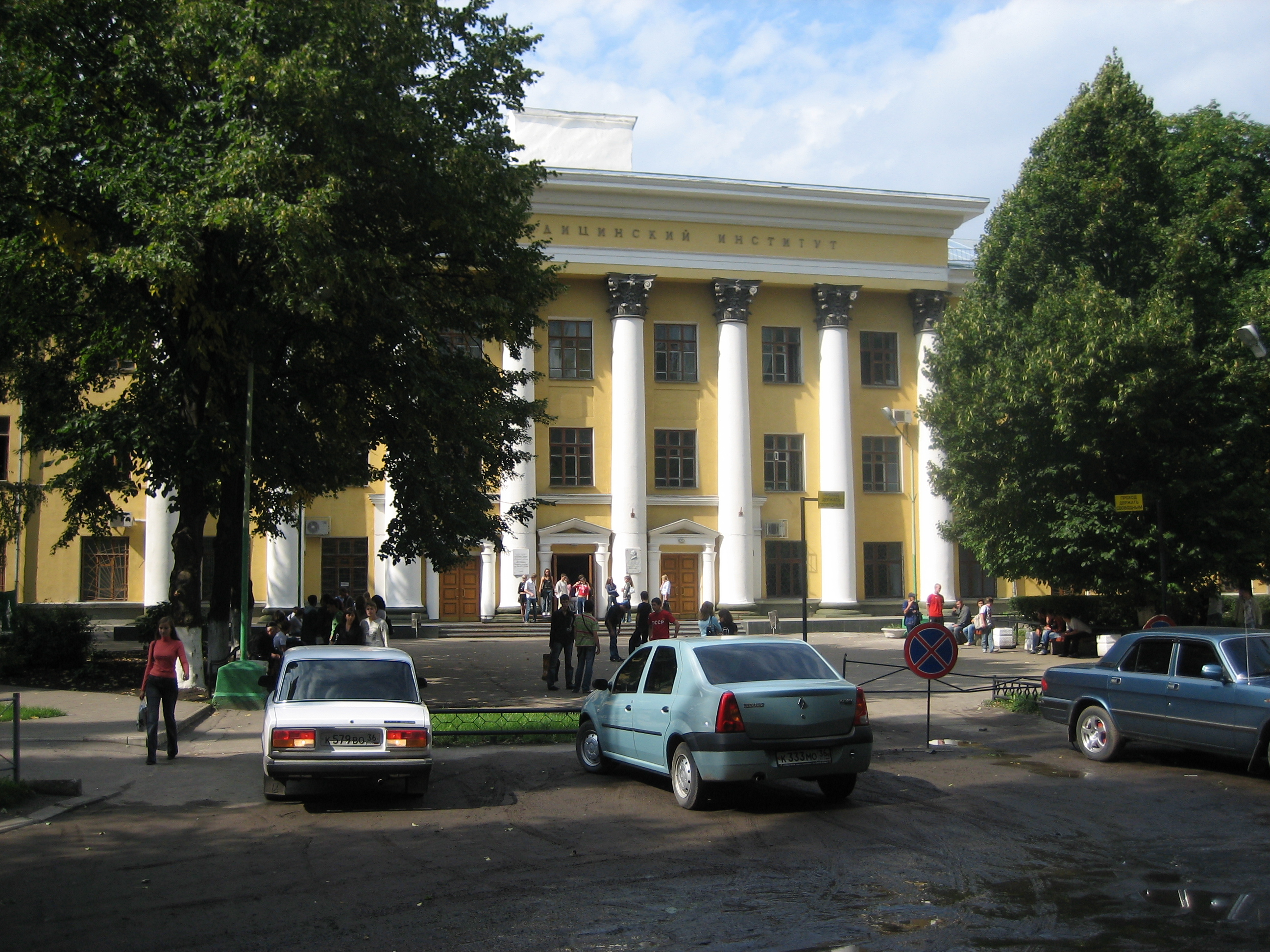
- Type: Medical university
- Established: 1930
- Location: Voronezh, Russia; 51°40′39″N 39°12′17″E
- Website: vrngmu.ru

Voronezh State Medical University named after N. N. Burdenko (former Voronezh State Medical Academy, VSMA) (Note: Russian: Воронежский государственный медицинский университет имени Н. Н. Бурденко) is located in Voronezh, Russia.

== Overview ==
In December 1930, the medical faculty of Voronezh State University became an independent medical institute consisting of two faculties the faculty of general medicine and the faculty of health. In 1933, the pediatric faculty, in 1957, the faculty of stomatology (dentistry), and 1983, the faculty of continuing education for medical specialists and practicing physicians, were added. In 1992, the international faculty of medical education and the faculty of pre-university training were introduced.

== Dedication to International Students ==
In the year of foundation — 1994. International students are offered training in the following programs: «General Medicine», «Pediatrics», «Dentistry» and «Pharmacy». Voronezh State Medical University offers MBBS in English for foreign students.

== Degree Programs ==
- Graduate courses
- General Medicine
- Pediatrics
- Stomatology (Dentistry)
- Nursing
- Medico-prophylaxis
- Pharmacy
- Secondary medical and pharmaceutical education:
- Nursing
- Prosthetic dentistry
- Pharmacy
- Postgraduate courses
- Internship
- Residency
- Ph.D. Course

== Notable alumni ==
- Maher al-Sharaa, Syrian politician and physician
