= Lev Rapoport =

- Лев Рапопорт
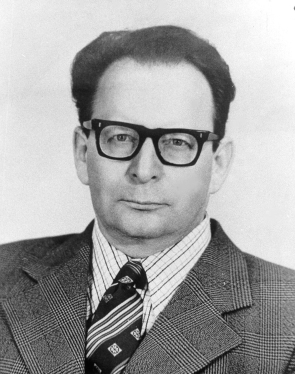
- Born: January 13, 1920
- Died: September 15, 2000 (aged 80)
- Awards: Distinguished Scientist of the Russian Federation
- Scientific career
- Fields: theoretical nuclear physics

Lev Pavlovich Rapoport (Russian: Лев Павлович Рапопорт, January 13, 1920 – September 15, 2000) was a Soviet and Russian physicist known for his works in nuclear and atomic theoretical physics.

== Early work ==
His first works in this field concerned the simplest of atoms, atomic hydrogen, and, more specifically, light scattering from, and two-photon ionization of, hydrogen atoms. His analytical calculations of the cross sections for those processes are now considered classic works, and the methods he used to derive the corresponding formulas have formed the basis of many subsequent theoretical works by researchers both in Russia and abroad.

== Further work ==
Rapoport's scientific achievements spanned a wide range of physics. After becoming a well-known specialist in theoretical nuclear physics during the 1950s, he published works in the then-new fields of superfluidity and superconductivity in the early 1960s. He gave a generalization of the Ginzburg–Landau equations applicable for lower temperatures and proposed a microscopic theory of magnetic flux quantization in superconductors. He also contributed to the development of the theory of finite Fermi systems, which he applied to the nuclear processes of beta decay and electron capture. In this work, the Green's function method formed the basis for numerical calculations. Further modifications of the Green's function method enabled researchers to study multiphoton processes in many-electron atoms and in simple molecules and also made possible numerical calculations of higher-order relativistic effects in atomic spectra.

== Co-workers ==
Rapoport involved many of his students in scientific research. His high standards for teaching made him a leader in education, not only in physics but in many other programs at Voronezh State University. For example, he was a member of the university's scientific council, on which he actively influenced both the curricula and the scientific research of the university's mathematics and science departments. During the last quarter century of his life, he was the leading professor at Voronezh State University. In all, he trained 25 PhD students, 8 of whom subsequently obtained the DSc degree in physics and became professors who are now working in Russia and abroad. One may say that Rapoport guided the development of both the curricula and the faculty of the department of theoretical physics at Voronezh State University.

== Recognition ==
The high quality of his research brought Rapoport increasing recognition. For his pioneering contributions to the theory of multiphoton processes in atoms, he was awarded the DSc degree in 1970 by St. Petersburg State University. In 1980, he was given the title Distinguished Scientist of the Russian Federation, which is an honor granted annually by the Russian government to only about 100 scientists in all scientific fields. Additionally, he was among the first recipients of grants for fundamental research from both Russian and international scientific foundations, including the Russian Foundation for Basic Research and the International Science Foundation. Rapoport also served on the Russian Academy of Science's Scientific Council for Atomic Spectroscopy and Scientific Council for Coherent and Nonlinear Optics.
