= Maher al-Sharaa =

Syrian politician and physician (born 1972)

- ماهر الشرع
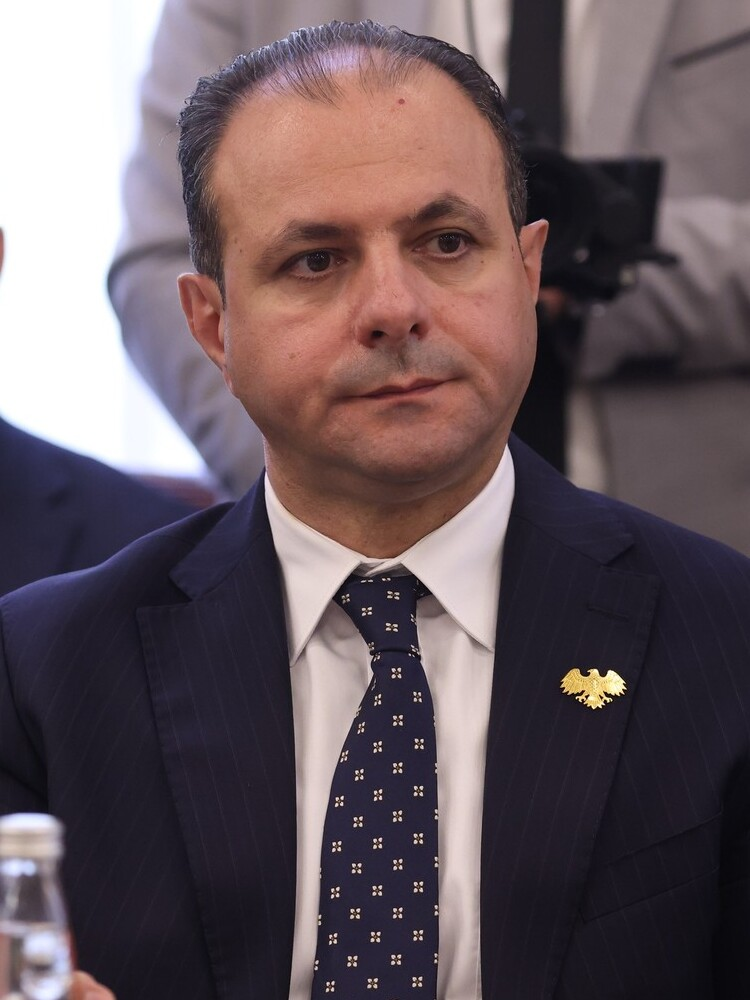
- Al-Sharaa in 2025

Secretary-General to the Presidency
- In office 5 April 2025 – 9 May 2026
- President: Ahmed al-Sharaa
- Deputy: Ali Keda (Note: As the Assistant Secretary-General of the Presidency for Cabinet Affairs)
- Preceded by: Abdul Rahman Salama
- Succeeded by: Abdul Rahman al-Aama

Acting Minister of Health
- In office 16 December 2024 – 29 March 2025
- President: Ahmed al-Sharaa (Note: As de facto leader until 29 January 2025)
- Prime Minister: Mohammed al-Bashir
- Preceded by: Mazen Dukhan
- Succeeded by: Musaab Nazzal al-Ali

Personal details
- Born: 1972 (age 53–54) Damascus, Syria
- Party: Independent
- Other political affiliations: Hay'at Tahrir al-Sham (until 2025)
- Spouse: Tatiana Zakirova
- Children: 3
- Parent: Hussein al-Sharaa (father)
- Relatives: Sharaa family
- Education: Voronezh State Medical University
- Occupation: Politician, physician

Maher al-Sharaa (Note: Arabic: ماهر الشرع, romanized: Māher ash-Sharaʿ) (born 1972) is a Syrian politician and physician who served as Secretary-General to the Presidency from 2025 to 2026. He previously served as Acting Minister of Health in the Syrian caretaker government from December 2024 to March 2025. He is the brother of Ahmed al-Sharaa, the current President of Syria.

Born in Damascus, Syria, he spent many years living in the Russian city of Voronezh, where he earned a diploma in health systems management from Burdenko Voronezh State Medical University in 2000. He also holds a doctorate in medical sciences and has completed multiple advanced training programs at both the Voronezh Medical Academy and Voronezh State Medical University. In July 2022, he flew to İzmir, Turkey, and has not returned to Russia since. He later reappeared in Syria as part of the caretaker government.

On 5 April 2025, Maher al-Sharaa was appointed Secretary-General, a position considered one of the highest-ranking posts in the Syrian state. During his tenure, he met with Russian Deputy Prime Minister Alexander Novak and Patriarch John X of Antioch. In October 2025, he accompanied his brother Ahmed and other Syrian officials when they met with Russian President Vladimir Putin. On 9 May 2026, he was dismissed and replaced by former Homs Governor Abdul Rahman al-Aama.

== Early life and education ==
Maher al-Sharaa was born in 1972 in Damascus, Syria. He is the eldest son of the Syrian economist and writer Hussein al-Sharaa. He previously used the name "Maher al-Hussein" and kept it secret that he was Ahmed’s brother.

Al-Sharaa reportedly spent many years living in the Russian city of Voronezh, where he earned a diploma in health systems management from the Burdenko Voronezh State Medical University in 2000. He later completed a specialization in obstetrics and gynecology at the same institution in 2004. He also holds a doctorate in medical sciences and has participated in multiple advanced training programs at both the Voronezh Medical Academy and Voronezh State Medical University. The Syrian Salvation Government (SSG) stated that al-Sharaa served at Syria’s Minister of Health as head of the gynecology department until 2012, when he was arrested and fled the Assad regime.

Between 2004 and 2013, al-Sharaa worked in several hospitals across Syria. He later returned to Voronezh, where he practiced in various women’s health clinics. From 2014 to 2018, he worked at Abha Maternity and Children’s Hospital, and in 2018, he joined Es Class Clinic, a medical center in Russia. From 2014 to 2021, he also served as a gynecologist at the Road Clinical Hospital in Voronezh.

Agentstvo also cited a doctor-review website that listed al-Sharaa as a Voronezh-based obstetrician-gynecologist with 25 years of experience and a five-star rating as of December 2023.

According to the SSG, he worked between several regional Arab and Western countries and in northern Syria from 2022 to 2023. Based on information from Russian border authorities, al-Sharaa flew to İzmir, Turkey, in July 2022 and has not returned to Russia since. He later resurfaced in Syria as part of the Syrian caretaker government.

== Political career ==
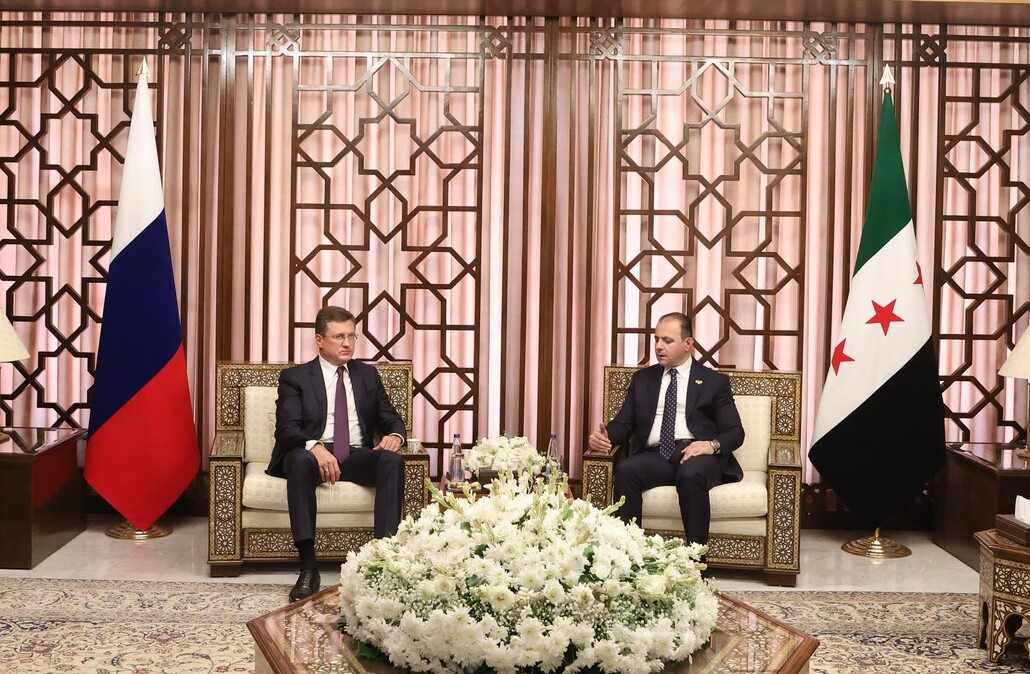
Al-Sharaa meets Russian Deputy Prime Minister Alexander Novak, September 2025

Al-Sharaa was an advisor to the minister of health in the Syrian Salvation Government.

=== Acting Minister of Health (2024–2025) ===
On 16 December 2024, he was appointed acting Minister of Health in the Syrian caretaker government. According to the Shaam News Network, the appointment was seen as nepotistic, since al-Sharaa is the brother of Syrian de facto leader (and later president) Ahmed al-Sharaa. On 31 December, al-Sharaa praised Turkey’s role during the Syrian civil war as “resolute and supportive,” adding that future relations would be friendly and cooperative.

On 6 January 2025, al-Sharaa met in Damascus with the King Salman Humanitarian Aid team to discuss supporting Syria’s healthcare sector. On 15 January, German Development Minister Svenja Schulze met with al-Sharaa to discuss hospital cooperation, becoming one of the first senior Western officials to visit Syria in more than a decade. On 4 February, the Syrian National Symphony Orchestra performed for the first time since Bashar al-Assad’s ouster. Among the audience were European and Gulf Arab diplomats, as well as al-Sharaa and his family. On 29 March, the caretaker government was succeeded by the Syrian transitional government, and he succeeded Musaab Nazzal al-Ali as Minister of Health.

=== Secretary-General to the Presidency (2025–2026) ===
On 5 April 2025, the Syrian Presidency appointed al-Sharaa as Secretary-General, succeeding Abdul Rahman Salama. The position of Secretary-General was reportedly regarded as a high-ranking post within the Syrian state.

In July 2025, al-Sharaa was reportedly supervising Syrian Foreign Minister Asaad al-Shaibani during his meetings with Russian Foreign Minister Sergey Lavrov in Moscow. On 13 August, Patriarch John X of Antioch met with al-Sharaa at the Damascus Patriarchate, and al-Sharaa offered condolences for the St. Elias Church martyrs, stressing that the crime threatens Syria’s unity.

On 9 September, Russian Deputy Prime Minister Alexander Novak met with al-Sharaa to discuss prospects for broad bilateral cooperation. On 28 September, al-Sharaa convened a meeting with the economy and transport ministers and the head of the Land and Sea Ports Authority to address the challenges in Syria’s land transport sector.

On 15 October, Syrian President Ahmed al-Sharaa arrived in Moscow with his brother Maher, along with Syrian officials, al-Shaibani, Defense Minister Murhaf Abu Qasra, and General Intelligence Director Hussein al-Salama. His brother, Ahmed, met with Russian President Vladimir Putin at the Kremlin Palace. On 28 January 2026, he once again accompanied his brother Ahmed to meet Putin at the Kremlin Palace.

On 24 February, Hussein al-Sharaa told Zaman al-Wasl that President Ahmed al-Sharaa intended to dismiss his brothers, Maher al-Sharaa and Hazem al-Sharaa, from their government positions. According to Zaman al-Wasl, the move was part of an effort to restructure the president's inner circle and address criticism over nepotism.

On 9 May, as part of a partial government shuffle, al-Sharaa was dismissed and replaced by former Homs Governor Abdul Rahman al-Aama as Secretary-General. Al-Aama was appointed through a presidential decree issued by Ahmed al-Sharaa.

== Personal life ==
Al-Sharaa is married to Tatiana Zakirova, a Russian-Syrian national of Russian ancestry. She was active in the business sector until 2020. The couple has three children: Rashid, Maria, and Kamel. Al-Sharaa is the brother of Ahmed al-Sharaa, the former leader of Hay'at Tahrir al-Sham and the president of Syria following the fall of the Assad regime.
