= Mazen Dukhan =

Syrian politician and physician

- مازن دخان

Minister of Health
- In office 10 December 2024 – 16 December 2024
- Prime Minister: Mohammed al-Bashir
- Preceded by: Ahmad Damiriyah
- Succeeded by: Maher al-Sharaa

Minister of Health in the Syrian Salvation Government
- In office 28 February 2024 – 10 December 2024
- Prime Minister: Mohammed al-Bashir
- Succeeded by: Position abolished

Personal details
- Born: 1969 (age 56–57) Idlib, Syria
- Party: Independent
- Other party: Hay'at Tahrir al-Sham (until 2025)
- Profession: Physician, Politician

Mazen Dukhan (Arabic: مازن دخان) is a Syrian physician and politician who had served as the Minister of Health in the Syrian caretaker government under prime minister Mohammed al-Bashir. He had also held the same position in the Syrian Salvation Government.
