= Anadan =

Anadan عندان ʿAnadān
- Location in Syria
- Coordinates: 36°17′37″N 37°2′40″E
- Country: Syria
- Governorate: Aleppo Governorate
- District: Mount Simeon District
- Elevation: 420 m (1,380 ft)

Population (2004)
  - Total: 11,918
- Time zone: UTC+2 (EET)
  - Summer (DST): UTC+3 (EEST)
- Area code: 21

Anadan (Arabic: عندان) is a city in Syria, 12 kilometers north of Aleppo, located on the Aleppo–Gaziantep international road. It is in the Mount Simeon District of the Aleppo Governorate. According to the Syria Central Bureau of Statistics (CBS), Anadan had a population of 11,918 in the 2004 census.

The town is known for its agriculture produce, such as grain, legumes, olives and different types of fruit. The city of Anadan is built on a hill surrounded by a plain. Anadan currently has about thirteen mosques and several elementary schools, a junior high school and a high school for boys and girls.

During the Ayyubid period, in the 1220s, Anadan was visited by Syrian geographer Yaqut al-Hamawi who noted it was "a village near Kinnasrin, in the Kurah district of Urtik, of the Awasim Province." The 13th-century Marasid listed it as a village northeast of Aleppo.

== Syrian civil war ==
Anadan was a crucial site of fighting during the Syrian civil war between opposition forces and the Assad government, sitting on the strategic Gaziantep-Aleppo highway that linked the city of Aleppo to the Turkish border, which was a crucial supply road for rebel forces. Rebels seized the town following the Battle of Anadan from July 29–30, 2012.

Most of the population of Anadan were pro-rebel, like other towns in the northern Aleppo countryside; the Syrian rebel group Liwa Ahrar Souriya, one of the founding battalions of the Free Syrian Army's 16th division, was formed in the town, attracting many recruits. However, some residents were also government loyalists, and were recruited into pro-Assad militias including the Baath brigades.

Since then, Anadan experienced heavy shelling in retaliation by the Syrian military. Approximately 30,000 people—most of Anadan's population—have fled according to opposition sources. As a result, Anadan has been described as a "ghost town" by journalist Suleiman al-Khalidi of Reuters. Amnesty International released satellite images which show that Anadan has come under heavy artillery bombardment during the uprising. On 24 January 2017, Jabhat Fateh al-Sham captured the town from Ahrar al-Sham militants. On 16 February 2020, the city was recaptured by the Syrian Arab Armed Forces.

During the Northwestern Syria offensive (2024), Syrian opposition forces recaptured Anadan.

== Notable people ==
- Abdul Rahman Salama, Syrian politician and former military commander (born 1971)
