= Vanora Bennett =

British author and journalist

Vanora Bennett (born 1962) is a British author and journalist.

== Biography ==
Bennett grew up in London, the eldest daughter of the flute player William Bennett and the cellist Rhuna Martin, and read Russian and French at the University of Oxford. She also studied Russian at Voronezh State University in the former Soviet Union and at Le Centre d'Études Russes du Potager du Dauphin, a centre established by White Russian emigres outside Paris, at Meudon.

She has published four historical novels since 2006, a travel book about Russia in 2003, and a non-fiction book about the first Chechen war in 1998. She reported from France and Africa, then spent seven years as a foreign correspondent in Russia and the CIS for Reuters and the Los Angeles Times, before returning to the UK as a leader writer for The Times of London. She left the newspaper in 2004 to write a new book and to study the Middle East.

Bennett won an American Overseas Press Club award in 1997 for her work on Russia, and the British Orwell Prize for journalism in 2004.

Bennett's first novel, Portrait of an Unknown Woman, told the story of the German Protestant artist Hans Holbein painting the family of the English statesman Sir Thomas More, a committed Catholic, at the time of King Henry VIII's decision to take England out of the Church of Rome in the early 1530s. It was shortlisted for the 2007 Authors' Club First Novel Award.

Her novel, Midnight in St Petersburg, set during the Russian Revolution, was published in 2013.

Bennett now lives in London. She is married to the barrister Chris McWatters. They have two children.

== Books ==
- Crying Wolf: The Return of War to Chechnya. Picador. 1998. ISBN 978-0-330-35170-6.
- The Taste of Dreams: An Obsession with Russia and Caviar. Headline Review. 2003. ISBN 978-0-7553-0064-8.
- Portrait of an Unknown Woman. HarperCollins, William Morrow. 2007 [2006]. ISBN 978-0-00-722493-7.
- Figures in Silk/Queen of Silks. HarperCollins, William Morrow. 2008 [2007]. ISBN 978-0-00-722495-1.
- Blood Royal/The Queen's Lover. HarperCollins, William Morrow. 2010 [2009]. ISBN 978-0-00-728192-3.
- The People's Queen. HarperCollins. 2010. ISBN 978-0-00-728195-4.
- Midnight in St Petersburg. Century. 2013. ISBN 978-1-78089-159-0.
