= Secretary-General to the Presidency (Syria) =

Senior administrative position within the Syrian Arab Republic

Secretary-General to the Presidency of Syria
- الأمين العام لرئاسة الجمهورية (Arabic)
- Emblem of Syria

- Flag of Syria
- Incumbent; Abdul Rahman al-Aama since 9 May 2026
- General Secretariat of the Presidency
- Style: Secretary-General (informal)
- Reports to: President
- Seat: Damascus, Syria
- Appointer: President
- Term length: At the president's pleasure
- Precursor: Ministry of Presidential Affairs
- Formation: 13 December 2023; 2 years ago
- First holder: Abdul Rahman Salama (Note: The first of post-Ba'athist Syria)
- Deputy: Ali Keda (Note: As the Assistant Secretary-General of the Presidency for Cabinet Affairs)

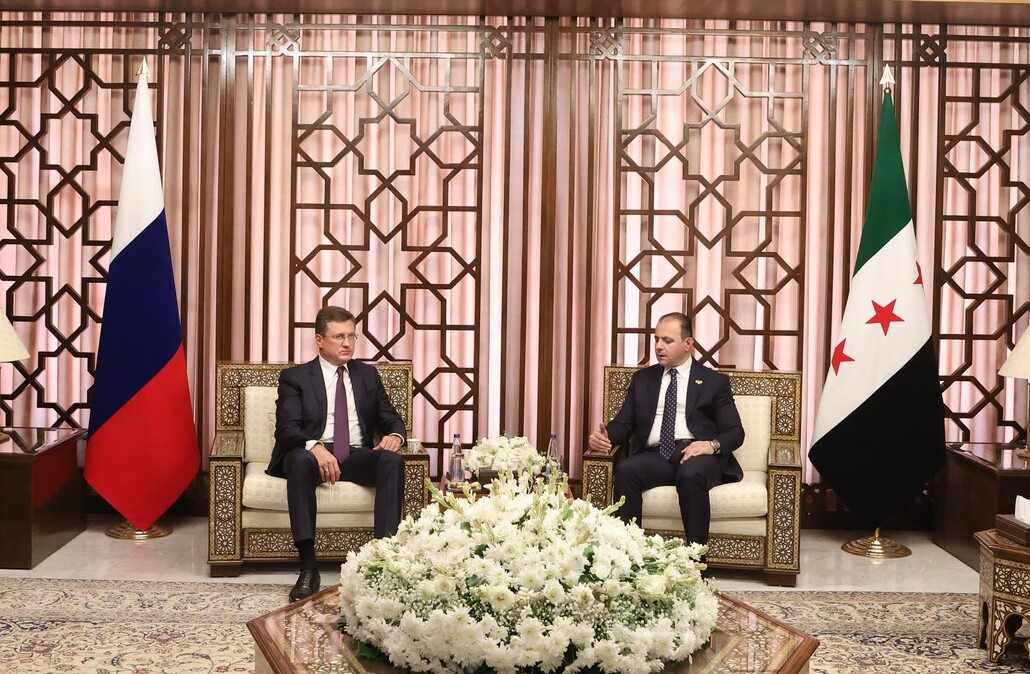
Former Secretary-General Maher al-Sharaa meets Russian Deputy Prime Minister Alexander Novak, September 2025

The Secretary-General to the Presidency (Arabic: الأمين العام لرئاسة الجمهورية, ALA-LC: Al-Amīn al-‘Āmm li-Ri’āsat al-Jumhūriyya), is a senior administrative position within the Syrian government responsible for overseeing the administrative and organizational affairs of the Presidency of the Syrian Arab Republic. It is considered one of the highest-ranking posts in the Syrian state.

Under Ba'athist rule, it was known as the General Secretariat of the Presidency of the Republic, which aimed to support the President in carrying out his duties and exercising his powers. The position of Secretary-General remained vacant until the fall of the Assad regime in December 2024.

It has been held by Abdul Rahman al-Aama since 9 May 2026, under President Ahmed al-Sharaa.

== History ==
During Ba'athist Syria, President Bashar al-Assad issued decrees on 13 December 2023 that established the "General Secretariat of the Presidency of the Republic," replacing the former Ministry of Presidential Affairs. The decree stated that all staff of the former Ministry of Presidential Affairs were moved to the General Secretariat, where they reported instead of directly to the president.

On 5 April 2025, the Syrian presidency appointed Maher al-Sharaa as Secretary-General, succeeding Abdul Rahman Salama.

Observers have described the position as a prime minister, even though it does not officially hold the title. The position of Secretary-General was reportedly regarded as a high-ranking post within the Syrian state. The position is also referred to as the chief of staff of the Syrian transitional government. On 9 May 2026, Syrian President Ahmed al-Sharaa appointed Abdul Rahman al-Aama as Secretary-General through a presidential decree, replacing Maher al-Sharaa.

== Role and responsibilities ==
The Secretary-General is responsible for managing the administrative and organizational affairs of the Presidency, overseeing the President’s schedule, organizing official meetings and visits, and coordinating with government institutions to implement presidential directives.

As Secretary-General, the position acts as the chief coordinator between the presidency and other government bodies, such as the cabinet, parliament, and military agencies. It is responsible for drafting resolutions, laws, and presidential decrees, as well as providing the president with political, economic, and social reports to support decision-making. The role involves supervising the Presidency’s staff and attending official events as the president’s representative.

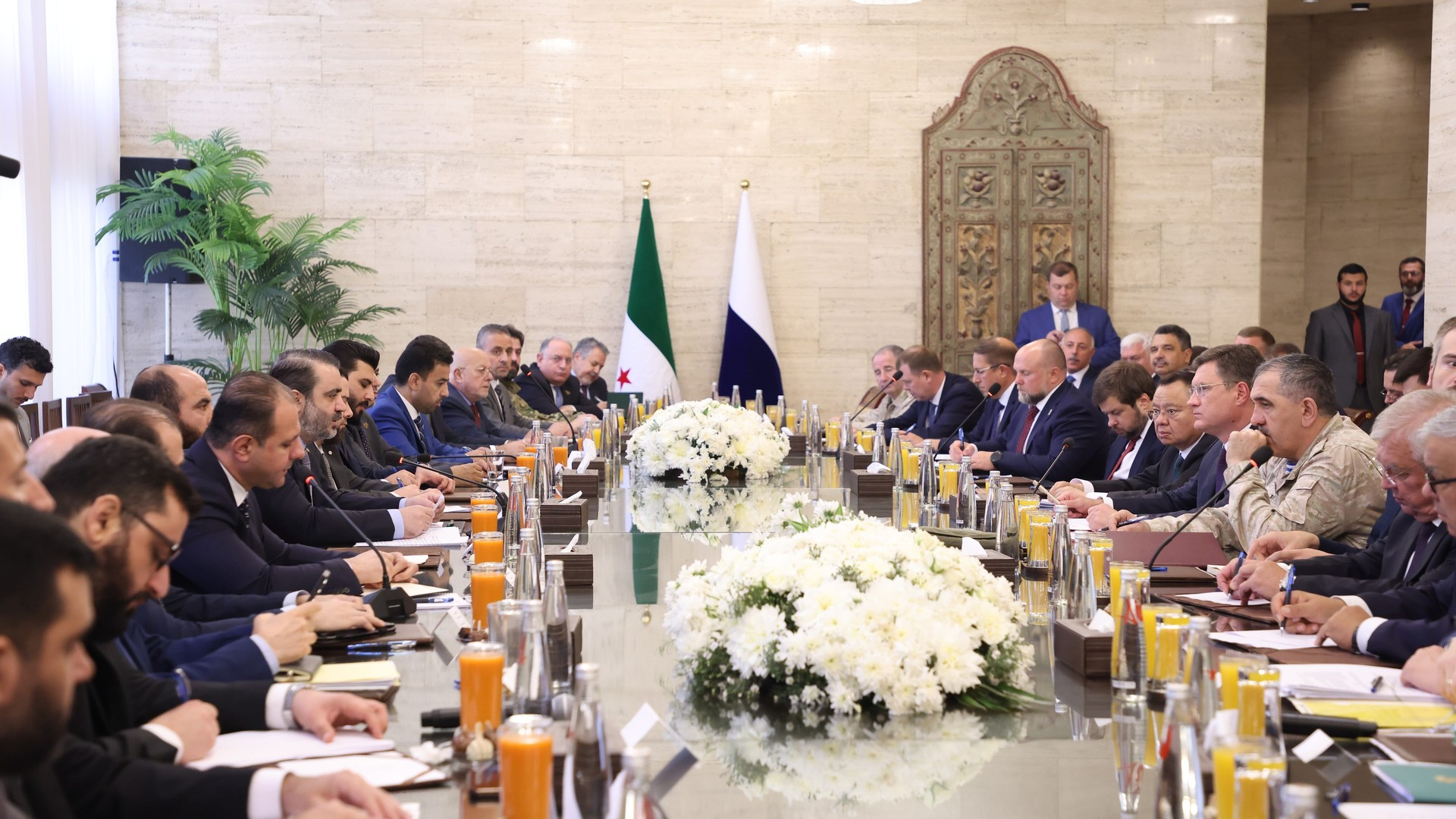
Former Secretary-General Maher al-Sharaa with a Russian delegation in Damascus, September 2025

During Ba'athist Syria under Bashar al-Assad’s government, the General Secretariat aimed to support the President in performing his duties and exercising his powers. It was responsible for managing and supervising the administrative, financial, and legal affairs of the Presidency and was headed by a Secretary-General.

== Officeholders ==
No.	Portrait	Name (Birth–Death)	Took office	Left office	President
Ba'athist Syria (2023–2024)
Vacant (13 December 2023 – 8 December 2024)
Syrian transitional government (2024–present)
1		Abdul Rahman Salama (1971)	29 January 2025	5 April 2025	Ahmed al-Sharaa
2		Maher al-Sharaa (1973)	5 April 2025	9 May 2026	Ahmed al-Sharaa
3		Abdul Rahman al-Aama (1987)	9 May 2026	Incumbent	Ahmed al-Sharaa

== See also ==
- Syrian transitional government
- People's Palace of Syria
