= Battle of Anadan =

2012 battle of the Syrian Civil War

Battle of Anadan معركة عندان
- Part of the Battle of Aleppo and the 2012–13 escalation of the Syrian Civil War
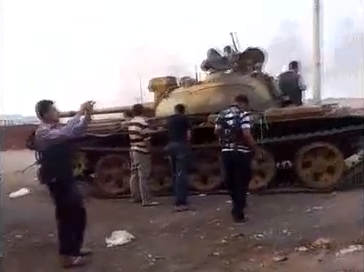
- Rebel fighters with a captured Syrian Army T-55 at the Anadan checkpoint during the battle
Date	29–30 July 2012 (1 day)
Location	Anadan, Aleppo Governorate
Result	Rebel victory: Rebels gain control of Anadan checkpoint

Belligerents
Syrian Opposition	(Syria) Syrian Government

Commanders and leaders
Gen. Abdel Nasser Firzat (Syrian opposition) 1st Lt. Rifaat Khalil (Muthanna ibn Haritha Battalion)	Unknown

Units involved
Free Syrian Army; Conquest Brigade; Muthanna ibn Haritha Battalion; Al-Tawhid Brigade; Free North Battalion	Syrian Armed Forces; Syrian Army; Infantry Border Guard Brigade; 111th Regiment

Strength
150 fighters 1 BMP-1	130+ soldiers 12 tanks 1 helicopter

Casualties and losses
4 killed	6 killed, 25 captured, 1–2 main battle tanks destroyed and 8 captured 5 APCs captured

The Battle of Anadan (Arabic: معركة عندان) was a ten-hour-long armed confrontation between the rebels of the Free Syrian Army and soldiers of the Syrian Army that occurred when FSA forces attempted to overrun a large army checkpoint in the Anadan area. At the end of the battle, FSA fighters successfully seized the checkpoint.

== Events ==
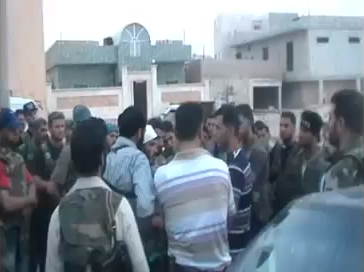
Rebels gather during the battle

At dusk on 29 July, First Lieutenant Rifaat Khali, commander of the Conquest Brigade in the area, mobilized 150 fighters to seize control of the Anadan checkpoint, a strategic location linking the city of Aleppo 5 kilometres (3.1 mi) to the south with the Turkish border to the north, which the FSA used as a source for supplies. The battle took place concurrently with the first night and day of the Battle of Aleppo itself.

FSA fighters surrounded the checkpoint as night fell and began an assault against the garrisoned troops and besieged them. A force of 50 fighters out of an initial 150 fighters took part at first, using RPGs, machine guns, and assault rifles. The besieged government soldiers called in artillery strikes from batteries based in Aleppo city, which pounded areas surrounding the checkpoint, striking nearby villages where FSA fighters were located, in a last-ditch effort to force the FSA to disengage, but failed to do so. Three hours after the attack began, a loyalist helicopter arrived and circled the area, but had little effect on the battle. The lack of reinforcements for the government soldiers during the whole ten hours led to speculation that the Syrian army was under significant military pressure in other areas of Aleppo.

An FSA operated BMP-1 infantry fighting vehicles supported the fighters, as they assaulted the base, firing at least 70 rounds into the checkpoint. After ten hours of fighting, some of the government soldiers were able to break out and flee. At least six of them were killed and 25 others captured. The FSA lost four fighters, and an unknown number were wounded.

== Aftermath ==
After seizing the checkpoint, FSA fighters retrieved ammunition left behind by the defeated government forces. During the fighting, eight tanks were also captured, between four and seven of which were still operational; the operational ones were intended for use in the Battle of Aleppo. At least some of the captured tanks were deployed northwards to Azaz, where they were used to support an attack on a loyalist-held airbase. The rebels, however, pulled back from their attack on the airbase within a day after failing to capture it.

== Bibliography ==
- Bolling, Jeffrey (2012). Rebel Groups in Northern Aleppo Province (PDF). Washington, D.C.: Institute for the Study of War.
