= Abdul Rahman al-Aama =

Secretary General of the Presidency of Syria since 2026

- عبد الرحمن العما

Secretary-General to the Presidency
- Incumbent
- Assumed office 9 May 2026
- President: Ahmed al-Sharaa
- Deputy: Ali Keda (Note: As the Assistant Secretary-General of the Presidency for Cabinet Affairs)
- Preceded by: Maher al-Sharaa

Governor of Homs
- In office December 2024 – 9 May 2026
- President: Ahmed al-Sharaa
- Preceded by: Namir Habib Makhlouf
- Succeeded by: Murhaf Khaled al-Naasan

Personal details
- Born: Abdul Rahman Badreddine al-Aama; 1987 (age 38–39)
- Party: Independent
- Occupation: Veterinarian, politician

Abdul Rahman Badreddine al-Aama (Note: Arabic: عبد الرحمن العما, romanized: Abdul Rahman Badr al-Din al-A'ma) (born 1987) is a Syrian veterinarian and politician who has served as the Secretary-General to the Presidency since May 2026. He previously served as the Governor of Homs from 2024 to 2026 and as Minister of Development and Humanitarian Affairs in the Syrian Salvation Government from 2018 to 2021.

== Biography ==
Abdul Rahman Badreddine al-Aama was born in 1987 and earned a Master's degree in Business Administration from the University of the People, a Bachelor’s Degree in Public Institution Administration from Roshd University, a Diploma in Human Resources Management from American Institute of Business and Development, and a Bachelor’s Degree in Veterinary Medicine from University of Homs. He has held several governmental and humanitarian positions, including serving as Director of the Central Planning Authority.

== Career ==
Al-Aama served as the Minister of Development and Humanitarian Affairs in the Syrian Salvation Government from 2018 to 2021.

=== Governor of Homs (2024–2026) ===
Al-Aama served as the Governor of Homs from 2024 to 2026.

On 11 March 2025, al-Aama met with the Turkish Ambassador in Damascus, Burhan Koroglu, to discuss ways to strengthen cooperation between the two countries, particularly in the service, development, and economic sectors.

On 30 April, al-Aama met with a delegation from the Syrian community in Canada to discuss investment opportunities in Homs Governorate, especially in Hisyah, as well as issues related to education, healthcare, the environment, and war compensation. On 21 May, al-Aama held talks with the Italian Chargé d’Affaires in Damascus, Stefano Ravagnan, regarding enhanced bilateral cooperation on reconstruction efforts following recent developments concerning the lifting of US sanctions on Syria.

On 9 November, al-Aama met with a German delegation comprising representatives from the Federal Ministry for Economic Cooperation and Development to discuss support for recovery and reconstruction projects in the province, including the status of several Germany-funded projects implemented by various United Nations organizations. On 20 April 2026, Defense Minister Murhaf Abu Qasra held a meeting with al-Aama and the accompanying delegation, during which several issues of mutual concern were reviewed. The discussions focused on expanding prospects for cooperation in a way that would strengthen the role of the Syrian Arab Army in consolidating security and stability in the province.

=== Secretary-General to the Presidency (2026–present) ===
On 9 May 2026, Syrian President Ahmed al-Sharaa appointed al-Aama as Secretary-General through a presidential decree, replacing Maher al-Sharaa. Saudi-owned, London-based Al Majalla noted that al-Aama's appointment as secretary-general was interpreted as an attempt to counter accusations of nepotism, since the position had previously been held by Ahmed al-Sharaa's brother, Maher al-Sharaa.
