= Damascus Hospital =

Coordinates: 33.505716°N 36.269635°E

Geography
- Location: Damascus, Syria

Organisation
- Care system: Public
- Type: Hospital
- Affiliated university: Ministry of Health

Services
- Beds: 645

History
- Founded: 1947

Links
- Website: www.damascushospital.sy
- Lists: Hospitals in Syria

Damascus Hospital (Arabic: مشفى دمشق, romanized: Mashfā Dimashq) also known as Al Mujtahid Hospital) in Damascus is one of the largest hospitals in Syria. It was founded in 1947 and is run by the Ministry of Health.

== Description ==
The hospital provides medical, therapeutic and surgical services to patients. It also functions as a teaching hospital, training students and graduate doctors from Syrian universities. Collaborating with universities, Damascus Hospital also conducts scientific research.

Hospital activities include internal specialties such as cardiology, neurology, gastroenterology and nephrology. The hospital also performs general, endoscopic, vascular and cardiac surgery, neurosurgery and urosurgery.

There are 645 beds at Damascus Hospital, 36 of which are for intensive care. It has a special emergency ward for internal diseases as well as an operations ward. The operations ward contains 12 operating rooms suitable for laparoscopic and open heart surgery as well as computerized neurosurgery.

Damascus Hospital also contains a kidney transplant unit, a physiotherapy unit and a stem cell bank. Additionally, the hospital has facilities for MRI and CT scan, a gamma camera and lithotripsy device. Analyses performed by the hospital lab include hormonal, immune, tumor, pharmaceutical, and lymphatic tests.
