= List of governors of Aleppo Governorate =

Governor of Aleppo Governorate
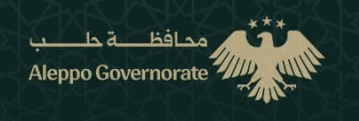
- Emblem of Aleppo Governorate
- Incumbent; Azzam al-Gharib since 21 December 2024
- Style: His Excellency
- Appointer: President of Syria
- Term length: No term limits
- Website: Aleppo Governorate

The following is a list of governors of Aleppo Governorate, the most populous governorate of Syria, since 1971.

== List of officeholders (1971–present) ==
Person	Name in Arabic	Time as governor
Ahmed Ismail	أحمد اسماعيل	24 June 1971 – 29 December 1977
Hussein Battah	حسين بطاح	28 January 1978 – 15 March 1980
Nihad al-Qadi	نهاد القاضي	15 March 1980 – 3 January 1983
Muhammad Mawalli	محمد موالدي	8 January 1983 – 23 December 1993
Muhammad Mustafa Mero	محمد مصطفى ميرو	26 December 1993 – 12 March 2000
Salah Kanaj	صلاح كناج	9 October 2000 – 1 April 2003
Osama Hamid Uday	أسامة حامد عدي	3 April 2003 – 6 June 2005
Tamer al-Hijjah	تامر الحجة	6 June 2005 – 23 April 2009
Ali Ahmed Mansoura	علي أحمد منصورة	23 April 2009 – 15 August 2011
Mowafak Ibrahim Khalouf	موفق إبراهيم خلوف	15 August 2011 – 16 August 2012
Mohammed Akkad	محمد وحيد عقاد	16 August 2012 – 22 October 2014
Marwan Olabi	مروان علبي	22 October 2014 – 7 September 2016
Ahmad Hussein Diab	حسين دياب	7 September 2016 – December 2024
Azzam al-Gharib	عزام الغريب	21 December 2024 – present

== See also ==
- Aleppo
- History of Aleppo
- Timeline of Aleppo
- List of governors of Damascus
- List of governors of Homs
