= Voronezh State University =

University in Voronezh, Russia

- Воронежский государственный университет
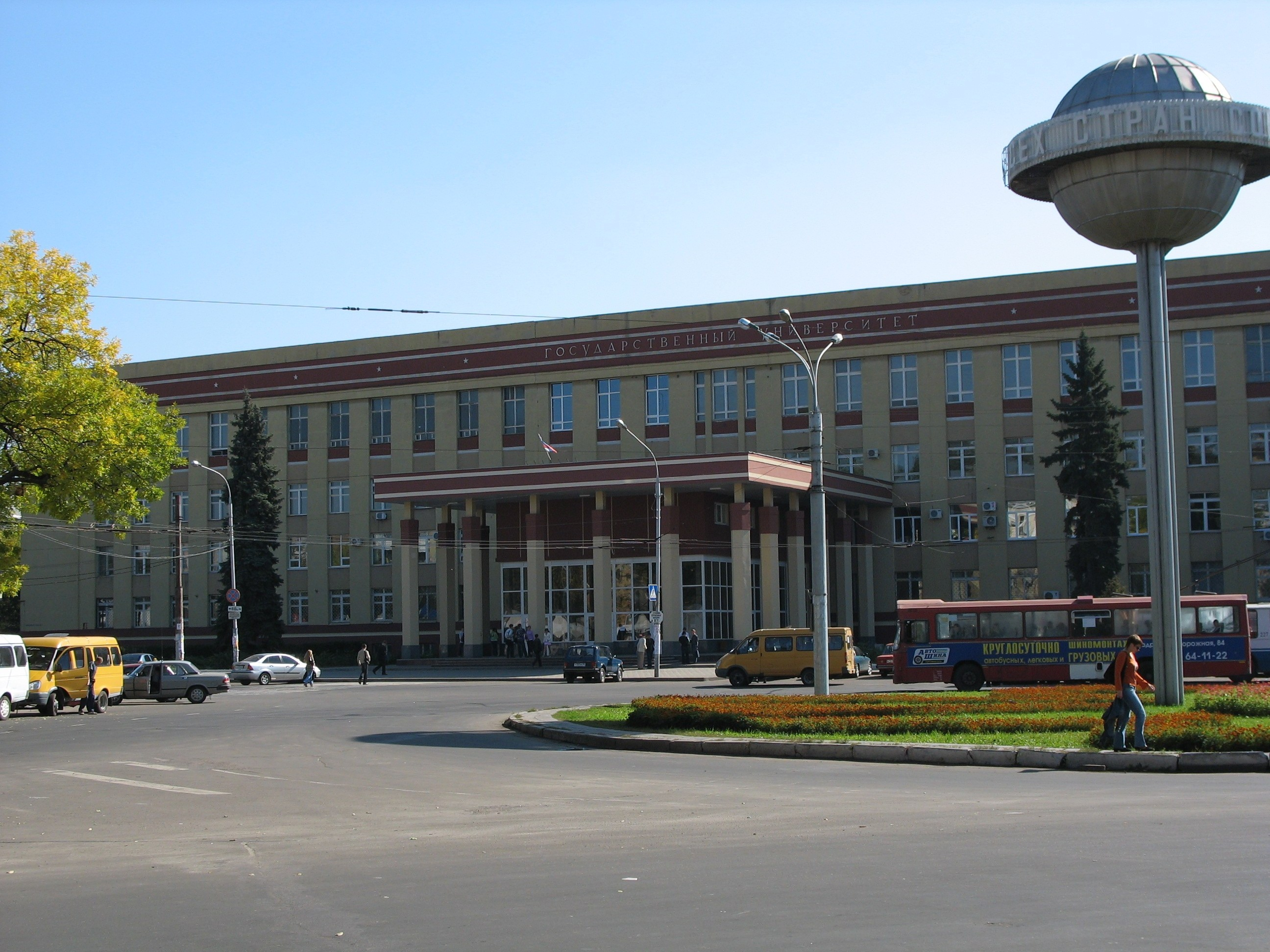
- University campus in 2006
- Motto: "Semper in motu" (Always in motion)
- Type: Liberal Arts
- Established: 1918
- Rector: Endovitsky Dmitry Aleksandrovich
- Faculty: 1,300
- Administrative staff: 1,700
- Undergraduates: over 22,000
- Postgraduates: almost 1000
- Location: Universitetskaya Square 1, Voronezh, Russia; 51.65589°N 39.20609°E
- Campus: Multiple campuses
- Website: vsu.ru

University rankings

Regional – Overall
- QS Emerging Europe and Central Asia: 192 (2022)

Voronezh State University (Russian: Воро́нежский госуда́рственный университе́т, ВГУ; VSU) is one of the main universities in Central Russia, located in the city of Voronezh. The university was established in 1918 by professors evacuated from the University of Tartu in Estonia. The university has 18 faculties and an enrollment of 22,000 students from Russia, Europe, Africa, the Americas and Asia. Besides, the university has 6 research institutes and 16 research laboratories administered by the Russian Academy of Science. The university is composed of 10 buildings and 7 resident halls situated throughout the city. For over 90 years the university has trained more than 100,000 professionals.

== History ==
In 1802 following a decree of Russian Emperor Alexander I the University of Tartu in Estonia was re-established. As a result of the German occupation of Estonia during World War I in March 1918, Russian students and professors had to leave the Estonian territory for their own safety. It was decided that a new university would be established in central Russia. In July and September 1918 from Dorpat (now Tartu), 39 professors, 45 lecturers, 43 staff and about 800 students arrived in Voronezh. The first rector of the university was Basil E. Regel.

On 12 November 1918 four faculties started working, namely the faculty of Medicine, the faculty of Physics and Mathematics, the faculty of History and Philology and the Law faculty. In the beginning of 1919, the university had an enrollment of 10,000 students. Anyone could study there, only 4 years later in 1923 that entrance exams were introduced. In 1920, after the Treaty of Tartu, the properties of the University of Tartu (libraries, archives, manuals, documents and other objects) were returned to Estonia. However, most of the teachers who have left due to the onset of the army of Imperial Germany and the occupation of Estonia, did not return to Estonia.

In the early 1920s, the Voronezh Institute of Education was added to the university, which marked the beginning of pedagogical faculties, departments that prepares teachers of mathematics, physics, chemistry, natural science, Russian language and literature, social and economic disciplines for schools. In 1930, the medical faculty was transformed into an independent institute. During World War II the university was relocated in Yelabuga in the Republic of Tatarstan for a period of two years from 1941 to 1943.

== Faculties ==
- Applied Mathematics, Informatics and Mechanics
- Mathematics
- Computer Sciences
- Physics
- Chemistry
- Pharmaceutics
- Medicine and Biology
- Economics
- Geography, Geoecology & Tourism
- Geology
- History
- Institute of International Education
- International Relations
- Journalism
- Law
- Philology
- Philosophy and Psychology
- Romance and Germanic Philology
- Military education

== Buildings and infrastructures ==
Voronezh State University has 10 academic buildings and seven residence halls located primarily in the city centre.

== Fundamental research ==
=== research centres ===
- Wave Processes in Inhomogeneous and Non-Linear Media ( Director: Prof. Aleksandr S. Sidorkin http://www.rec.vsu.ru/eng/)
- Innovative Technologies (Director: Prof. Boris A. Zon )
- Spacecraft and Rocket Engineering (Co-Director: Prof. Sergey A. Zapryagayev )
- Radio Engineering and Electronics (Co-Director: Prof. Ivan I. Borisov )
- Scientific and technological cooperation with the EU ( Director: Prof. Igor N. Zornikov )
- Shared use of research equipment ( Director: Dr. Mikhail V. Lesovoy )
- Technology Transfer ( Director: Dr. Igor V. Aristov )
- Geography, Land use and Geo-ecology( Co-Director: Prof. Vladimir I. Fedotov )
- Geology ( Co-Director: Prof. Sergey A. Zapryagayev )
- Human ecology ( Co-Director: Prof. Semyon A. Kurolap )
- Biology ("Venevitino")
- Chemical Physics ( Co-Director: Prof. Ivan I. Borisov )

=== research laboratories ===
- Wave Processes (Co-Director: Prof. Boris A. Zon http://www.vsu.ru/english/depts/research/labs/waveproc.html )
- X-ray Crystallography (Co-Director: Dr. Kseniya B. Aleynikova )
- Electron Spectroscopy for Solid-State Physics (Academic Director: Prof. Evelina P.Domashevskaya Administrative Director: Dr. S.V. Ryabtsev http://www.vsu.ru/english/depts/research/labs/spectroscopy.html)
- Mathematical Simulation of Complex Nonlinear Processes and Structures (Co-Director: Prof. V.V. Obukhovskiy http://www.vsu.ru/english/depts/research/labs/mathsim.html)
- Theoretical Physics (Director: Kopitin I.V. )
- Biodiversity and Ecosystems Monitoring
- Conjugated Processes in Electrochemistry and Corrosion
- Economics and Management
- Ellipsometric Materials Research
- Geodynamics and Seismic Monitoring Academic
- Geology and Minerals
- History of Archaeological Research and Records in Eurasia
- Institute of Geology, Mineralogy and Geo-Chemistry of Russian Academy of Sciences, Voronezh Branch ( Director: Prof. Nikolay M. Chernyshov )
- Ion Exchange and Chromatography
- Photostimulated Processes in Crystals (Co-Director: Prof. Anatoly N. Latyshev )
- Physics and Chemistry of Nanoscale Structured Systems ( Co-Director: Prof. Irina Ya. Mittova )
- Systematics and Ecology of Insects ( Co-Director: Prof. Oleg P. Negrobov )

=== research institutes ===
- Chemistry and Pharmacy
- Geology
- Mathematics (Director: Prof. Victor G. Zvyagin)
- Physics
- Social Sciences

== Alumni ==
- Vanora Bennett, British author and journalist
- Svitlana Bilyayeva, archaeologist
- Anna Bogomazova, Russian kickboxer and professional wrestler
- Alan Bookbinder, British journalist, charity executive, and academic administrator
- Fidel Ángel Castro Díaz-Balart, Cuban nuclear physicist and son of Fidel Castro
- Robert Chandler, British poet and literary translator
- Pavel Cherenkov, 1958 Nobel Prize in Physics laureate
- Alexandr Sidorenko, soviet minister of geology
- Mary Dejevsky, British journalist
- Charlotte Hobson, British writer, author of Black Earth City
- Catriona Kelly, British academic specialising in Russian culture
- Bridget Kendall, British journalist
- Igor Kobzev, Russian politician
- Mark Krasnosel'skii, Soviet mathematician
- Sally Laird, British writer, editor and translator
- Alistair Noon, a Berlin-based poet and translator of Mandelstam's Voronezh Workbooks
- Lev Pavlovich Rapoport Soviet (Russian) theoretician physicist
- Ali Mohamed Shein, 7th president of Zanzibar
- Alison Suttie, British politician
- Tim Whewell, British journalist

== See also ==
- List of modern universities in Europe (1801–1945)
