= Ministry of Health (Syria) =

Government ministry of Syria

- وزارة الصحة

Agency overview
- Formed: 1918, 1966 (current form)
- Preceding agency: Ministry of Health and Public Aid
- Jurisdiction: Government of Syria
- Headquarters: Damascus
- Minister responsible: Musaab Nazzal al-Ali
- Website: moh.gov.sy

The Ministry of Health (Arabic: وزارة الصحة, romanized: Wizārat al-Ṣiḥḥah) is a department of the Government of Syria.

== Responsibility ==
The Ministry is responsible for Health in Syria. The general objective of the Ministry, which was established in 1966, is to enhance the general health of the population by improving health indicators and achieving fairness in the distribution of health services assessed in coordination with other sectors and agencies.

The Ministry is also concerned with establishing and organizing health institutions, raising the level of health awareness for citizens, and ensuring safe and effective medicine.

The ministry has been responsible for preventing the COVID-19 pandemic in Syria.

== Organization ==
The organizational structure of the Ministry consists of:

- Minister's Office Directorate
- Directorate of Internal Control
- Directorate of Planning and International Cooperation
- Service Centers Directorate
- Administrative Development Directorate
- Directorate of Human Resources
- Directorate of Legal Affairs
- Management accounting
- Information Technology Directorate
- Primary Health Care Directorate
- Directorate of Communicable and Chronic Diseases
- Directorate of Medical Equipment and Supplies
- Contracts Directorate
- Readiness Directorate
- Hospitals Directorate
- Department of Ambulance and Emergency
- Directorate of Pharmaceutical Affairs
- Drug Control Directorate
- Directorate of Drug Control and Research Laboratories
- Directorate of Public Health Laboratories
- Health Professions Directorate
- Supply Directorate
- Directorate of Medical Engineering and Maintenance
- Building Directorate
- Directorate of Health Strategic Studies
- Directorate of Medical Records and Licensing
- Mental Health Directorate
- Rehabilitation Center and Prosthetics
- Directorate of Transport and Vehicles

== List of ministers of health ==
- Bashir al-Azma
- Jamil Mardam Bey
- Badawi al-Jabal
- Wael Nader al-Halqi
- Saad Abdel-Salam al-Nayef
- Hassan al-Ghabbash
- Ahmad Damiriyah
- Mazen Dukhan
- Maher al-Sharaa (Acting)
- Musaab Nazzal al-Ali
