= List of governors of Homs Governorate =

Governor of Homs Governorate
- Incumbent; Murhaf Khaled al-Naasan since 10 May 2026
- Style: His Excellency
- Appointer: President of Syria
- Term length: No term limits
- Inaugural holder: Fawzi al-Maliki
- Formation: 1921
- Website: homsgov.sy

This is a list of governors of Homs Governorate since 1921.

== List of officeholders (1921–present) ==
Person	Time as governor
Fawzi al-Maliki	1921 – 1926 (killed)
Muhammad al-Hassan al-Mawsili	1926
Rashid al-Barazi	11 December 1926 – 15 February 1927
Muhammad al-Hassan al-Mawsili (second time)	1927 – 1928
Jamil al-Dahan	1928 – 1941
Haydar Mardam Bey	1941 – 1942
Fouad al-Halabi	1942 – 1946
Omar al-Adas	1946 – 1947
Abd al-Qader al-Maidani	1947 – 1948
Aref al-Anbari	1948
Bashir Fouad	1948 – 1950
Saeed al-Sayed	1950 – 1952
Muhammad Nour Allah	1952 – 1954
Rashid al-Hamid	1954 – 1955
Jamil Al-Qirbi	1955 – 1956
Saeed al-Sayed (second time)	1956 – 1957
Zaki al-Mahasni	1957 – 1958
Saeed al-Hajj	1958 – 1959
Mustafa Ram Hamdani	1959 – 1961
Jamal al-Noamani	1961
Mustafa Ram Hamdani (second time)	1961 – 1963
Muhammad Saeed Khaddam	1963 – 1964
Abd al-Fattah al-Boushi	1964
Mustafa al-Nabulsi	1964 – 1966
Muhammad Said Talib	1966
Muhammad Musa al-Kafri	1966 – 1967
Suleiman al-Azn	1967
Jabr al-Kafri	1967 – 1969
Marwan Sabbagh	1969 – 1971
Ismail Yousefi	1971 – 1973
Nizar Qouli	1973 – 1974
Ismail Okla	1974 – 1978
Mahmoud Kaddour	1978 – 1980
Fouad al-Absi	1980 – 1984
Mahmoud Klou	1984 – 1986
Yahya Abu Asli	1986 – 1993
Muhammad Naji al-Otari	1993 – 2000
Hossam al-Din al-Hakim	2000 – 2002
Sobhi Hamida	2002 – 2006
Muhammad Iyad Ghazal	2006 – 2011
Ghassan Mustafa Abd al-Aal	2011 – 2012
Ahmed Munir Muhammad	2012 – 2013
Talal al-Barazi	17 July 2013 – 2020
Bassam Mamdouh Parsik	2020 – 2022
Namir Habib Makhlouf	20 July 2022 – December 2024
Abdul Rahman al-Aama	December 2024 – 9 May 2026
Murhaf Khaled al-Naasan	9 May 2026 – present

== See also ==
- Homs
- History of Homs
- Timeline of Homs
- List of governors of Damascus
- List of governors of Aleppo
