= Azzam al-Gharib =

Syrian politician (born 1985)

- عزام الغريب

Governor of Aleppo
- Incumbent
- Assumed office 21 December 2024
- Preceded by: Ahmad Hussein Diab

Personal details
- Born: 1985 (age 40–41) Saraqib, Idlib Governorate, Syria
- Profession: Politician, military commander
- Nickname: Abu al-Izz Saraqib (Note: Arabic: أبو العز سراقب)
- Military career
- Allegiance: Ahrar al-Sham (2011– c. 2017); Levant Front (c. 2017–2024)
- Branch: Syrian National Army's Third Corps
- Service years: 2011–2024
- Rank: Commander
- Conflicts: Syrian civil war

Azzam al-Gharib (Note: Arabic: عزام الغريب) is a Syrian politician and former military commander. He was appointed Governor of Aleppo Governorate on 21 December 2024 by Syria's transitional leadership, following the fall of the Assad regime.

== Early life and education ==
Al-Gharib was born in 1985 in Saraqib, a town in the Idlib Governorate northwest of Syria. He later moved to Aleppo, where he completed a degree in dentistry at Aleppo University in 2006. He was arrested multiple times by the Assad regime between 2003 and 2006, spending time in the notorious Far' Falastin and Air Force Intelligence Directorate detention centers. His political activities and opposition to the regime made him a target, leading to his eventual involvement in the armed opposition.

In addition to his dental studies, al-Gharib pursued Islamic studies, earning a master's degree in Quranic interpretation from Bingöl University in Turkey. He also studied Automated Control Engineering at Aleppo University but was unable to graduate due to the outbreak of the Syrian civil war in 2011.

== Career ==
Al-Gharib's political and military career began during the Syrian revolution in 2011. Initially, he joined Ahrar al-Sham and the Islamic Front. He rose to deputy commander of the Islamic Front in 2015, but switched allegiance to the Levant Front around 2017. He rose in the ranks of the Levant Front, first becoming deputy and then commander of the unit in 2023. As head of the Levant Front, he also rose to prominence within the Syrian National Army (SNA) and became deputy commander of the SNA's Third Corps.

After the fall of the Assad regime, he was appointed governor of Aleppo.

== See also ==
- Cabinet of Syria
