= Musaab Nazzal al-Ali =

Syrian Minister of Health since 2025

- مُصعَب نَزَّالْ العَلِي

Minister of Health
- Incumbent
- Assumed office 29 March 2025
- President: Ahmed al-Sharaa
- Preceded by: Maher al-Sharaa (Acting)

Personal details
- Born: 1985 (age 40–41) Al-Tayyaneh, Deir ez-Zor, Syria
- Party: Independent
- Education: Homs University (MBBS)
- Profession: Neurosurgeon

Musaab Nazzal al-Ali (Note: Arabic: مُصعَب نَزَّالْ العَلِي; born 1985) is a Syrian-German neurosurgeon who has served as Minister of Health in the Syrian transitional government since 29 March 2025. Born in Al-Tayyaneh village, Deir ez-Zor Governorate in 1985, al-Ali is known for his medical career and involvement in the Syrian opposition during the early years of the Syrian civil war.

== Early life and education ==
Musaab Nazzal al-Ali was born in Al-Tayyaneh village, Deir ez-Zor Governorate in 1985. He graduated with a medical degree from Al-Ba'ath University (Note: Now called "Homs University".) in 2009, specializing in neurosurgery at the University of Aleppo. Al-Ali's medical career faced significant setbacks due to his political involvement, which led to his arrest in 2011. After leaving Syria, he continued his education in Germany, where he completed his specialization in brain and nerve surgery, eventually becoming a consultant.

== Career and contributions ==
Al-Ali’s medical career spanned across both Syria and Germany, where he worked in hospitals since 2014. In addition to his clinical work, he played a role in humanitarian efforts during the Syrian Civil War. He helped establish field hospitals and provided critical care in affected areas. He also trained local medical teams in trauma care, particularly in war-related injuries, and contributed to health care delivery in opposition-held areas.

He was an active member of the Syrian expatriate community, co-founding the Syrian Association in Germany, which aimed to implement developmental projects inside Syria and transfer medical expertise to assist those in need.

== Political involvement ==
Al-Ali was a vocal supporter of the Syrian revolution in 2011, which led to his arrest and forced exile. Upon his return to Syria, he became deeply involved in the opposition’s medical and humanitarian efforts, helping establish and support medical networks in areas affected by the conflict. His contributions have been critical in providing medical aid, including managing vaccination campaigns and addressing medical shortages.

== Minister of Health ==
On 29 March 2025, al-Ali was appointed as Syria’s Minister of Health in the transitional government led by President Ahmed al-Sharaa. His appointment came at a time when Syria's healthcare system faced severe challenges due to years of war, including infrastructure destruction, medical supply shortages, and a weakened health workforce. In his role as Minister of Health, al-Ali pledged to focused on rebuilding the healthcare infrastructure, providing essential medical supplies, and restoring public trust in health services.

He has emphasized the need for collaboration with Syrian expatriates and international medical organizations to rehabilitate the healthcare system. His administration is working on initiatives to provide essential healthcare services, improve hospital facilities, and ensure the availability of necessary medicines in the country.

Shortly after taking office, al-Ali conducted an official visit to Germany, where he met with a group of Syrian doctors residing in the country. The meeting aimed to explore mechanisms for supporting Syria’s healthcare sector and expanding cooperation with medical professionals abroad. Discussions focused on harnessing the expertise of Syrian doctors in the diaspora to enhance the national healthcare system.

== Personal life ==
Al-Ali was born in the town of Al-Tayyaneh, located in the eastern countryside of Deir ez-Zor Governorate. After completing his medical education in Syria, he moved to Germany to further his studies.

He holds German citizenship.
