= Ras al-Maara =

Ras al-Maara رأس المعرة
- Village
- Location in Syria
- Coordinates: 34°0′3″N 36°33′46″E
- Country: Syria
- Governorate: Rif Dimashq
- District: Yabroud
- Subdistrict: Yabroud

Population (2004 census)
  - Total: 8,520
- Time zone: UTC+2 (EET)
  - Summer (DST): UTC+3 (EEST)

Ras al-Maara (Arabic: رأس المعرة) is a Syrian village in the Yabroud District of the Rif Dimashq Governorate. According to the Syria Central Bureau of Statistics (CBS), Ras al-Maara had a population of 8,520 in the 2004 census.
