= Mohammad Abdul Rahman =

Syrian politician (born 1985)

- محمد عبد الرحمن
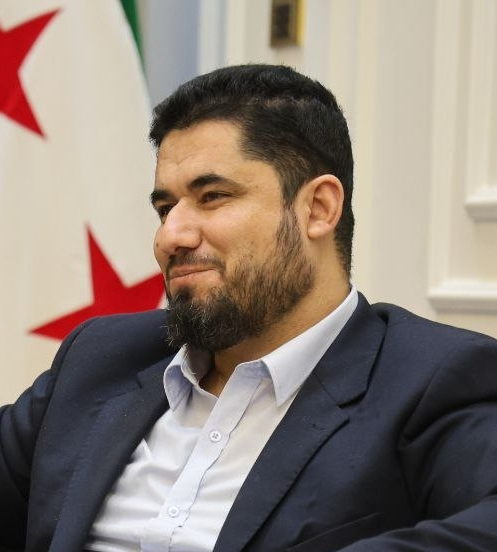
- Abdul Rahman in 2025

Governor of Idlib
- Incumbent
- Assumed office 19 January 2025
- Preceded by: Thaer Naseh Salhab

Minister of Interior
- In office 10 December 2024 – 19 January 2025
- Prime Minister: Mohammed al-Bashir
- Preceded by: Mohammad Khaled al-Rahmoun
- Succeeded by: Ali Keda

Minister of Interior in the Syrian Salvation Government
- In office 2022 – 10 December 2024
- Prime Minister: Ali Keda; Mohammed al-Bashir
- Succeeded by: Position abolished

Personal details
- Born: 1985 (age 40–41) Muhambal, Idlib, Syria
- Party: Independent
- Other political affiliations: Hay'at Tahrir al-Sham (until 2025)
- Education: Homs Military Academy
- Occupation: Politician, former military officer

Mohammad Abdul Rahman (Arabic: محمد عبد الرحمن; born 1985) is a former rebel and the current Governor of Idlib Governorate. Previously, he held the office of Minister of Interior in the Syrian caretaker government. He had also served as Minister of Interior in the Syrian Salvation Government for the government's sixth term from 2022 until December 2024.

== Early life and education ==
Abdul Rahman was born in the town of Muhambal in Idlib Governorate and graduated as an officer from the Military Academy in Homs. He defected from the Syrian Arab Army in 2012 and joined the Syrian opposition factions during the country's civil war.

== Activity during the civil war ==
In 2015, Abdul Rahman served as the General Supervisor for the management of Army of Conquest operations in Muhambal and its surrounding countryside. By 2017, he worked in the General Administration of Services and took on responsibilities within the Idlib branch, focusing on the Muhambal bloc, the eastern countryside of Jisr ash-Shughur, and public relations.

Between 2017 and 2018, he managed public relations and coordination in these regions. In 2019, he was appointed as the head of the Ariha bloc in the central region. He was later promoted to General Supervisor of the central region for the period of 2020–2021.

In 2022, Abdul Rahman was appointed Minister of Interior in the fifth term of the Syrian Salvation Government. He started serving in the same role in 2024 as part of the Syrian caretaker government under prime minister Mohammed al-Bashir, following the fall of the Assad regime and the decision that ministers of the salvation government will serve in the same roles in the transitional government until March 2025.

Abdul Rahman was later relieved of his duties as Minister of the Interior, and appointed as Governor of Idlib.

== See also ==
- Cabinet of Syria
