= Murhaf Abu Qasra =

Syrian politician and military officer (born 1984)

Major General Murhaf Abu Qasra
- مرهف أبو قصرة
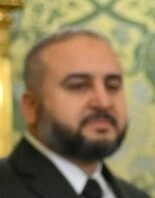
- Murhaf Abu Qasra in 2026

Minister of Defense
- Incumbent
- Assumed office 21 December 2024
- President: Ahmed al-Sharaa
- Prime Minister: Mohammed al-Bashir (2024–2025)
- De facto leader: Ahmed al-Sharaa (Note: As de facto leader until 29 January 2025.)
- Preceded by: Ali Mahmoud Abbas

Commander-in-chief of Hay'at Tahrir al-Sham
- In office 2019 – 29 January 2025
- Leader: Ahmed al-Sharaa
- Succeeded by: Position abolished

Personal details
- Born: 1984 (age 41–42) Halfaya, Hama, Syria
- Party: Independent
- Other political affiliations: Hay'at Tahrir al-Sham (2017–2025)
- Profession: Politician, Engineer, Military Officer
- Nickname(s): Abu Hassan al-Hamawi (Note: Arabic: أبو حسن الحموي); Abu Hassan 600 (Note: Arabic: أبو حسن 600)

Military service
- Allegiance: Syria (2024–present); Formerly: Al-Nusra Front (until 2016); Jabhat Fateh al-Sham (2016–2017); Syrian Salvation Government (2017–2024); Hay'at Tahrir al-Sham (2017–2025)
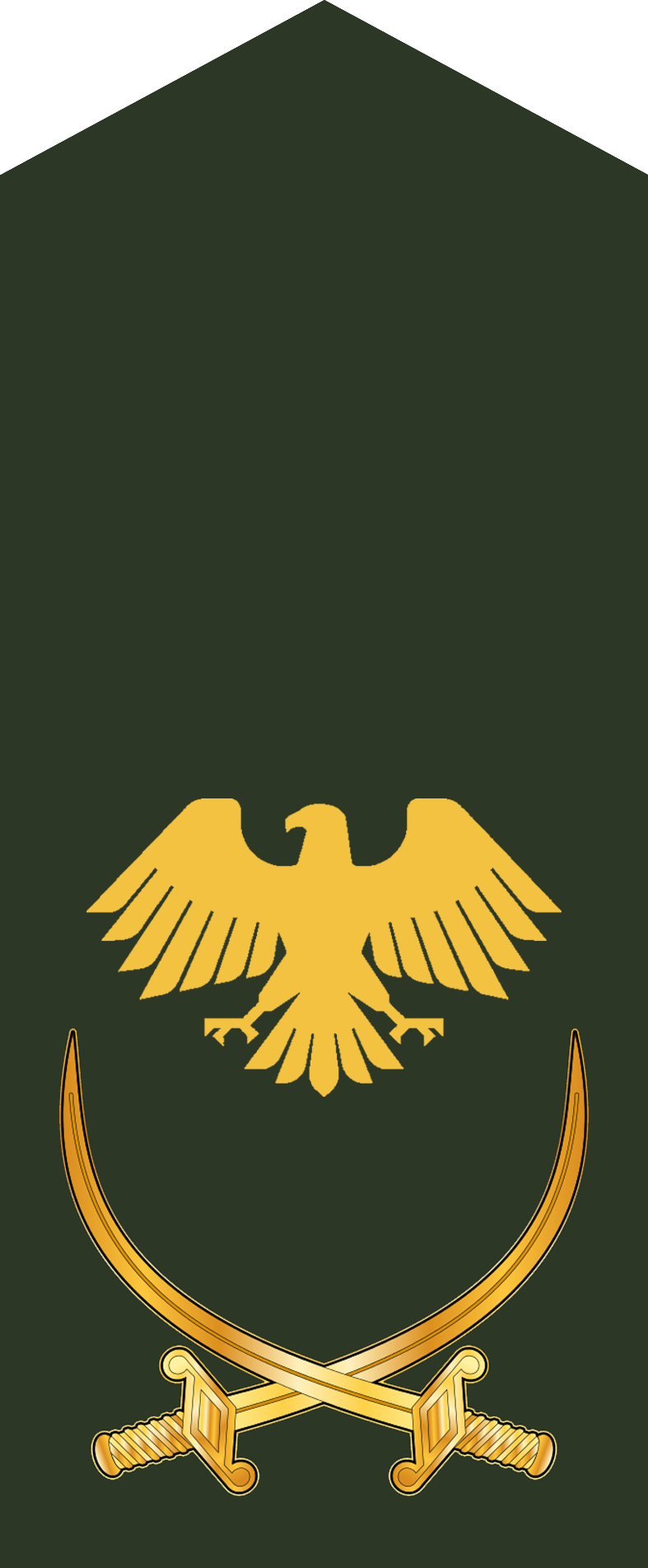
- Rank: Major general
- Commands: Syrian Armed Forces
- Battles/wars: Syrian Civil War

Murhaf Ahmed Abu Qasra, (Note: Arabic: مرهف أحمد أبو قصرة) also known by his nom de guerre Abu Hassan al-Hamawi, is a Syrian military officer and former agricultural engineer who is currently serving as Minister of Defense in the Syrian transitional government since 21 December 2024. He is one of Ahmed al-Sharaa's closest allies in the country's post-Assad government.

His appointment comes as part of a broader effort to institutionalise and unify the military forces of the former Syrian opposition.

== Early life and education ==
Abu Qasra holds a bachelor's degree in agricultural engineering. Before the outbreak of the Syrian civil war, he worked in his field of study. With the escalation of the conflict, he utilized his engineering expertise to support the armed opposition.

== Career ==
Abu Qasra emerged as a prominent figure in the military efforts of the opposition forces. He served as a military capabilities engineer, organizing and leading operations in opposition-held areas. Over the years, he gained recognition for his role in coordinating and executing key military strategies. As a senior figure of Hay'at Tahrir al-Sham, he carried the nom de guerre Abu Hassan 600 or Abu Hassan al-Hamawi. As the head of HTS’ military wing, Abu Qasra was responsible for the creation of HTS’ drone unit, the Shaheen Brigades, which were named by Abu Qasra himself. He was also one of the key ringleaders in the 2024 Syrian opposition offensives.

=== Minister of Defense ===
On 21 December 2024, Abu Qasra was appointed Minister of Defense in the Syrian caretaker government by the transitional leadership, with the announcement made by Ahmed al-Sharaa, the General Commander of the Military Operations Command. The appointment came with significant talks to merge all opposition factions into a single institution under the Ministry of Defense, marking a turning point in efforts to unify military operations in post-Assad Syria. On 29 December, al-Sharaa announced the promotion of several officers, including Abu Qasra, who was elevated to the rank of Major-General.

On 29 March 2025, a transitional government was formed, in which Abu Qasra maintained his position as minister of defense. He oversaw the mass integration of jihadist militias such as the Turkistan Islamic Party into the Syrian Army, while firmly opposing the integration of the Women's Protection Units. Abu Qasra justified his stance by claiming that allowing women to serve in the army was "against Islam" despite the fact that all neighboring Muslim states allow women in their militaries.

== See also ==
- Cabinet of Syria
