= Mohamed Abdul Rahman =

Mohamed Abdul Rahman may refer to:

- Mohamed bin Abdul Rahman (born 1935), Malaysian sprinter
- Mohamed Abdul Rahman (sport shooter), Bahraini shooter
- Mohammed Abdul Rahman, alias of Guantanamo Bay detainee Lotfi Bin Ali
- Mohammad Abdulrahman Tarkou, Syrian academic
- Mohammad Abdul Rahman, Syrian politician
