= Sham Cash =

- Developer: Unknown
- Release: Unknown, first seen in use during the Syrian civil war
- Operating system: Unknown
- Platform: Unknown

Sham Cash (or ShamCash) is a mobile payment service in Syria primarily used for online transactions and for disbursing salaries to government employees alongside submitting quota payments by the Syrian government.

== History ==
Sham Cash was first introduced during the Syrian civil war in opposition-held areas in Idlib, at the time controlled by the Syrian Salvation Government. After the fall of the Ba'athist-led regime and the subsequent formation of the Syrian transitional government, Sham Cash would be adopted as the national online payment system, with the Syrian Ministry of Finance announcing that all government salaries must now be paid through Sham Cash.

== Controversy ==
=== Personal data ===
Currently, as of September 6, there is no clear personal data policy on Sham Cash, resulting in concerns regarding data storage and the sharing of said data with third parties such as government agencies, foreign financial institutions or analytics firms.

=== Transactions ===
Currently, as of September 6, all transactions made on Sham Cash bypass the Central Bank of Syria entirely, with said transfers instead passing through Cham Bank, located in Idlib, a monetary exchange office without any international recgonition.

=== Glitches ===
Amidst Eid al-Fitr celebrations in Syria, government employees reported that they were 'locked out' of Sham Cash when attempting to receive their salaries, alongside raising concerns regarding security and functionality.
