= Mohammed al-Omar =

Syrian Information Minister

- محمد العمر

Minister of Information
- In office 10 December 2024 – 29 March 2025
- President: Ahmed al-Sharaa (Note: As de facto leader until 29 January 2025.)
- Prime Minister: Mohammed al-Bashir
- Preceded by: Ziad Ghosn
- Succeeded by: Hamza al-Mustafa

Minister of Information in the Syrian Salvation Government
- In office 2022 – 10 December 2024
- Prime Minister: Ali Keda; Mohammed al-Bashir
- Succeeded by: Position abolished

Personal details
- Born: Khan al-Sabil, Idlib, Syria
- Party: Independent
- Other political affiliations: Hay'at Tahrir al-Sham (until 2025)
- Occupation: Politician, journalist

Mohammed Yaqoub al-Omar (Note: Arabic: محمد يعقوب العمر) is the former Minister of Information in the Syrian caretaker government. He had previously served as Minister of Information in the Syrian Salvation Government in its seventh term until December 2024.

== Early life and education ==
Al-Omar was born in the town of Khan al-Sabil in Idlib Governorate. He holds a degree in political science and is pursuing a master’s degree in journalism and media.

== Activity during the civil war ==
Al-Omar joined the Syrian revolution in 2011 and became active in public mobilization. From 2012 to 2019, he played a big role in covering major battles in northern Syria as a journalist.

He served as a member of the media office of the Army of Conquest and contributed to the establishment of the Media Directorate within the Syrian Salvation Government. In 2019, he co-founded the Shaam News Network, which focuses on delivering news from opposition-controlled areas.

In 2024, following the fall of the Assad regime and the decision that ministers of the salvation government will serve in the same roles in the transitional government until March 2025, al-Omar began serving as minister of information in the Syrian caretaker government under prime minister Mohammed al-Bashir.

== Career ==
Al-Omar's tenure as Minister of Information is characterized by efforts to reform Syria's media landscape, promoting transparency and freedom of expression during a pivotal period in the nation's history. As he stated to Agence-France Presse: "We are working to consolidate freedoms of the press and expression that were severely restricted".

== See also ==
- Cabinet of Syria
