= Nazir al-Qadri =

Syrian politician and educator (born 1970)

- نذير القادري

Minister of Education
- In office 10 December 2024 – 29 March 2025
- President: Ahmed al-Sharaa (Note: As de facto leader until 29 January 2025.)
- Prime Minister: Mohammed al-Bashir
- Preceded by: Muhammad Amer Mardini
- Succeeded by: Mohammad Abdul Rahman Tarkou

Minister of Education in the Syrian Salvation Government
- In office 29 May 2023 – 10 December 2024
- Succeeded by: Position abolished

Personal details
- Born: 1970 (age 55–56) Damascus, Syria
- Party: Independent
- Other political affiliations: Hay'at Tahrir al-Sham (until 2025)
- Education: Damascus University
- Occupation: Politician, educator

Nazir Mohammad al-Qadri (Arabic: نذير محمد القادري; born 1970) is a Syrian politician and educator who served as the Minister of Education in the Syrian caretaker government between December 2024 and March 2025. He had also served as Minister of Education in the Syrian Salvation Government from May 2023 until December 2024.

Born in Damascus in 1970, al-Qadri completed his secondary education in his hometown. During his teaching career, he pursued university studies and graduated with a degree in Arabic language from Damascus University. He later enrolled in a master's program in Arabic literature and continues his postgraduate studies.

Al-Qadri worked as an Arabic language teacher for 18 years and also taught at a teacher training institute, specializing in Arabic language education. In 2008, he was arrested by the Syrian Ba'athist regime and spent 10 years in detention, until his release in 2018.

Following his release, al-Qadri contributed to the educational sector in opposition-held territories. He worked at the Dana Educational Complex for two years, overseeing educational activities. He was later appointed as the director of secondary education at the complex for one and a half years and served as the director of internal oversight for the Ministry of Education in the Syrian Salvation Government for more than a year. Additionally, he was a member of the Council of Education and chaired the Committee for Organization and Administration in the ministry.

In 2024, al-Qadri began serving as the Minister of Education in the Syrian caretaker government under prime minister Mohammed al-Bashir after the fall of the Assad regime and the decision that ministers of the salvation government will serve in the same roles in the caretaker government until March 2025.

== See also ==
- Cabinet of Syria
