= Qutaiba Ahmed Badawi =

Syrian official

- قتيبة أحمد بدوي

Director of the General Authority for Borders and Customs
- Incumbent
- Assumed office 23 November 2025
- President: Ahmed al-Sharaa
- Preceded by: Office established

Director of the General Authority for Land and Sea Ports
- In office 31 December 2024 – 23 November 2025
- President: Ahmed al-Sharaa
- Preceded by: Office established
- Succeeded by: Office abolished

Personal details
- Party: Independent
- Other political affiliations: Hay'at Tahrir al-Sham (until 2025)
- Nicknames: Al-Maghyara Binnesh (Arabic: المغيرة بنش); Abu Hamza Binnesh (Arabic: أبو حمزة بنش)

Qutaiba Ahmed Badawi (Arabic: قتيبة أحمد بدوي) is a Syrian government official who is currently serving as the Director of the General Authority for Borders and Customs since 23 November 2025. Previously, Badawi held prominent roles under Hay'at Tahrir al-Sham, including managing the Bab al-Hawa border crossing, serving as director of crossings, the Emir of Idlib sector and as the Director of the General Authority for Land and Sea Ports.

== Career ==
On 31 December 2024, Badawi was appointed as the Director of the General Directorate of Customs by Syrian Prime Minister Mohammed al-Bashir of the Syrian caretaker government. It was established as a part of restructuring efforts in Syria’s management of border crossings and maritime affairs in the aftermath of the fall of the Assad regime.

== During the Syrian civil war ==
Badawi was known by the alias "Al-Maghyara Binnesh" (coming from Binnesh, Idlib) during his tenure with Hay'at Tahrir al-Sham, where he was responsible for managing border crossings and economic activities in opposition-controlled areas.

== Controversy ==
=== Alleged relation to Ahmed al-Sharaa ===
Badawi's appointment has sparked controversy due to allegations of familial ties with Ahmed al-Sharaa, as he is his brother-in-law (Badawi being al-Sharaa's wife's brother). Critics suggest that his rapid ascent to power and influence within government circles may be linked to these personal connections.

Other sources had previously claimed that the alleged familial relationship was either untrue or implausible.

After al-Sharaa's appointment as president, it appeared that he has only one wife, Latifa al-Droubi, who is from Al-Qaryatayn in Homs Governorate, making any alleged familial relationship appear entirely implausible.

== See also ==
- Syrian caretaker government
