= Fawaz Hilal =

Syrian politician and economist

- فواز هلال

2nd Prime Minister of the Syrian Salvation Government
- In office 10 December 2018 – 18 November 2019
- Preceded by: Mohammed al-Sheikh
- Succeeded by: Ali Keda

Personal details
- Born: 1966 (age 59–60) Anadan, Aleppo, Syria
- Education: University of Aleppo (BA)

Fawaz Hilal (Arabic: فواز هلال, romanized: Fawwāz Hilāl) is a Syrian politician and economist who served as the second Prime Minister of the Syrian Salvation Government between December 2018 and November 2019.

== Early life and education ==
Hilal was born in 1966 in Anadan. He studied at the University of Aleppo, where he obtained a BA in Economics in 1990, followed by a postgraduate diploma in international relations in 1993. He then held various positions in the fields of economics and administrative development, working in Syria and the Gulf states.

== Role during the Syrian civil war ==
Following the outbreak of the Syrian civil war in 2011, Hilal sided with the Syrian opposition and joined the Free Aleppo Governorate Council, serving as the director of its financial office and then as the head of its economic office. Between 2013 and 2017, he served as the director of the Aleppo branch of the Food Security Program of the Assistance Coordination Unit, an NGO affiliated with the Syrian National Coalition.

=== Syrian Salvation Government ===
In September 2017, Hilal participated in the General Syrian Conference, the civil initiative that led to the formation of the Syrian Salvation Government (SSG). On 11 December 2018, the SSG's Constitution Drafting Assembly convened at Bab al-Hawa to elect Hilal as its new prime minister after the resignation of his predecessor, Mohammed al-Sheikh. Hilal resigned on 16 November 2019 amid public anger at economic difficulties and the activities of Hayat Tahrir al-Sham; the SSG's Shura Council claimed that the move was in accordance with protocol as Hilal's one-year term had expired. On 21 December 2021, Ali Keda appointed Hilal as the head of the SSG's Real Estate Rent Determination Committee.

On 17 December 2024, following the fall of the Assad regime, some media outlets reported that Hilal was appointed as Governor of Aleppo by Syria's new authorities. However, on 21 December, the governor was named as Azzam al-Gharib, the commander of Levant Front.
