= Watad Petroleum =

Rebel-owned Syrian petroleum company

- Type: State-owned enterprise
- Industry: Fuel importation and processing
- Founded: January 2017
- Defunct: October 2022
- Headquarters: Samarda, Idlib Governorate, Syria
- Owner: Hayat Tahrir al-Sham; Syrian Salvation Government

Watad Petroleum was a company that imported petroleum from Turkey to rebel-held areas of northwestern Syria during the Syrian civil war. It was founded in the largely rebel-held Idlib Governorate in 2017 and is thought to be owned by the militant group Hay'at Tahrir al-Sham.

== History ==
The company was established in 2017, reportedly shortly after the foundation of Hayat Tahrir al-Sham (HTS) which is believed to own the company. Watad had sourced petroleum from the Autonomous Administration of North and East Syria until early 2018, when Turkey launched a military operation which cut trade routes between the Autonomous Administration and HTS. Watad then began dealing with an unnamed Turkish company which sourced petroleum from Ukraine via the Bab al-Hawa Border Crossing. In January 2018, the company was granted a monopoly over the importation, processing and pricing of fuel in areas controlled by the Syrian Salvation Government.

In January 2019, Watad began sending gas cylinders and petroleum to areas held by the Syrian government after fuel shortages were experienced.

In November 2019, HTS arrested one of its commanders over a disagreement with Watad. The company demanded that locals selling oil work on behalf of Watad and trade exclusively in Watad products, and threatened to use force if compliance was not met.

On 18 July 2020, suicide drones launched from government areas attacked Watad's fuel market in Sarmada. On 31 July, the market was hit by three Grad rockets, causing several fires to break out. In retaliation, opposition and jihadist groups shelled government forces.

In October 2022 the company ceased its operations.
