= Mohamed Muslim =

Syrian politician (born 1988)

- محمد مسلم

Minister of Local Administration and Environment
- In office 10 December 2024 – 29 March 2025
- President: Ahmed al-Sharaa (Note: As de facto leader until 29 January 2025.)
- Prime Minister: Mohammed al-Bashir
- Preceded by: Louay Kharitah
- Succeeded by: Mohammed Anjrani

Minister of Local Administration and Services in the Syrian Salvation Government
- In office 28 February 2024 – 10 December 2024
- Prime Minister: Mohammed al-Bashir
- Succeeded by: Position abolished

Personal details
- Party: Independent
- Other political affiliations: Hay'at Tahrir al-Sham (until 2025)
- Profession: Politician

Mohamed Abdel Rahman Muslim (Arabic: محمد عبد الرحمن مسلم) is a Syrian politician who served as the Minister of Local Administration and Environment in the Syrian caretaker government under prime minister Mohammed al-Bashir from 10 December 2024 to 29 March 2025. He had also held the position of Minister of Local Administration and Services in the Syrian Salvation Government.
