= Abdel Moneim Abdel Hafez =

Syrian politician

- عبد المنعم عبد الحافظ

Minister of Higher Education and Scientific Research
- In office 10 December 2024 – 29 March 2025
- President: Ahmed al-Sharaa (Note: As de facto leader until 29 January 2025.)
- Prime Minister: Mohammed al-Bashir
- Preceded by: Bassam Hasan
- Succeeded by: Marwan al-Halabi

Minister of Higher Education in the Syrian Salvation Government
- In office 28 February 2024 – 10 December 2024
- Prime Minister: Mohammed al-Bashir
- Succeeded by: Position abolished

Personal details
- Party: Independent
- Other political affiliations: Hay'at Tahrir al-Sham (until 2025)
- Education: University of Aleppo
- Profession: Politician

Abdel Moneim Abdel Hafez (Arabic: عبد المنعم عبد الحافظ) is a Syrian politician who served as the Minister of Higher Education between December 2024 and March 2025 in the Syrian caretaker government under prime minister Mohammed al-Bashir. He had also held the same position in the Syrian Salvation Government. He obtained a degree in natural sciences from the University of Aleppo.
