= Aisha al-Dibs =

Syrian politician

- عائشة الدبس

Member of the People's Assembly
- Incumbent
- Assumed office 1 July 2026
- Appointed by: Ahmed al-Sharaa

Head of the Women's Affairs Office
- In office 22 December 2024 – 29 March 2025
- President: Ahmed al-Sharaa (Note: As de facto leader until 29 January 2025.)
- Prime Minister: Mohammed al-Bashir
- Preceded by: Office established
- Succeeded by: Office abolished

Personal details
- Born: Damascus, Syria
- Citizenship: Syria; Turkey
- Education: Damascus University

Aisha al-Dibs (Note: Arabic: عائشة الدبس) is a Syrian politician and civil society activist who is currently serving as a member of the People's Assembly since July 2026. Prior, she served as the Head of the Women's Affairs Office from 22 December 2024 until 29 March 2025. She became the first woman to hold an official position in the new Syrian administration that was formed after the fall of the Assad regime.

== Career ==
Al-Dibs promotes women's rights and civil society initiatives in Syria. Her appointment to the newly established Women's Affairs Office was announced by the Political Affairs Administration, led by Ahmed al-Sharaa, as part of broader efforts to include Syrian women in political and social leadership during the national rebuilding phase.

The Political Affairs Administration highlighted the office's focus on legal, social, cultural, and political issues concerning Syrian women.

=== Advocacy for women ===
In her first public statement, al-Dibs said that the new administration was committed to empowering women in all spheres of political, cultural, and social life. She described the establishment of the Women's Affairs Office and her leadership as a significant step toward shaping a more inclusive future for Syrian women.

=== Support for former detainees ===
One of al-Dibs' key initiatives involves supporting women released from detention following the collapse of the Bashar al-Assad government. She called on these women to report their cases to the Women's Affairs Office for comprehensive documentation and assistance, including psychological, legal, and health support.

Al-Dibs acknowledged challenges such as the loss of records during the chaotic prison openings, which complicated efforts to track and assist former detainees. She promised to continue efforts to address these issues and ensure justice for the women affected.

== Controversial statements ==
Al-Dibs faced widespread criticism following remarks made during an interview with Turkish broadcaster TRT Arabi on 28 December 2024. Her statements prompted public outcry, including calls for her dismissal. Al-Dibs stated that she would "not accept any opinion of feminist organizations or others that contradict the government's ideological orientation, or are incompatible with the government model".

Her remarks were described as contradictory, particularly her rejection of secularism and civil governance, coupled with her insistence on Islamic law as the sole guiding principle for Syria. Critics argued that such a stance is incompatible with Syria's religious and ideological diversity.

A central issue was her call for international support to establish a "Syrian model" grounded in Sharia law, which critics noted contradicts international human rights standards. This was perceived as indicative of the broader challenges faced by Hay'at Tahrir al-Sham in balancing its ideological roots with its pursuit of international legitimacy in the aftermath of the fall of the Assad regime.

Al-Dibs also criticized civil society organizations, blaming them for rising divorce rates in Idlib. (Note: The territory was administered by the Syrian Salvation Government under the control of Hay'at Tahrir al-Sham.) This claim, viewed by many as an attempt to justify restrictions on independent organizations, was criticized for undermining divorce as a legitimate personal right.

She rejected discussion with those of opposing views, stating, "In the end, I will not open the door to those who disagree with me ideologically".

Al-Dibs' statements were viewed as part of a broader crisis in which HTS attempted to reconcile its policies with efforts to gain international recognition. Critics suggested that the contradictions were a challenge to the legitimacy of HTS as seen by different parts of the Syrian population. Sara Organisation to Combat Violence against Women described al-Dibs' statements as being "far from the different cultures in terms of sects that exist inside Syria, pluralistic, democratic and decentralized".

== See also ==
- Cabinet of Syria
- Women in Syria
