= Mohammed Anjrani =

Syrian politician (born 1992)

- محمد عنجراني

Minister of Local Administration and Environment
- Incumbent
- Assumed office 29 March 2025
- President: Ahmed al-Sharaa
- Preceded by: Mohamed Muslim

Personal details
- Born: 1992 (age 32–33); Aleppo Governorate, Syria
- Profession: Mechanical engineer

Mohammed Anjrani (Arabic: محمد عنجراني) is a Syrian politician serving as the minister of local administration and environment since 29 March 2025 in the transitional government formed by President Ahmed al-Sharaa. He is from Aleppo Governorate and holds a degree in mechanical engineering.

Anjrani began his involvement in public affairs during the early stages of the Syrian revolution in 2011. He was briefly detained later that year due to his political activities. Following his release, he remained active in local governance and civil society initiatives, particularly in opposition-held areas.

He previously served as Secretary General of the Ministry of Religious Affairs and later as head of the Central Authority for Inspection and Control in the Syrian Salvation Government. He also held the post of Minister of Local Administration during its final two terms.

Anjrani played a role in launching developmental and administrative initiatives aimed at improving public services in conflict-affected regions. He was involved in coordinating programs focused on infrastructure rehabilitation, education, health services, and employment generation, especially in areas with high displacement rates.
