= Basel Abdul Hannan =

Syrian politician (born 1984)

- باسل عبد الحنان

Minister of Economy and Foreign Trade
- In office 10 December 2024 – 29 March 2025
- President: Ahmed al-Sharaa
- Prime Minister: Mohammed al-Bashir
- De facto leader: Ahmed al-Sharaa (Note: As de facto leader until 29 January 2025.)
- Preceded by: Mohammad Rabie Qalaaji
- Succeeded by: Nidal al-Shaar (as Minister of Economy and Industry)

Minister of Industry
- In office 10 December 2024 – 29 March 2025
- President: Ahmed al-Sharaa
- Prime Minister: Mohammed al-Bashir
- De facto leader: Ahmed al-Sharaa (Note: As de facto leader until 29 January 2025.)
- Preceded by: Mohammad Samer al-Khalil
- Succeeded by: Nidal al-Shaar (as Minister of Economy and Industry)

Minister of Economy and Resources in the Syrian Salvation Government
- In office 2019 – 10 December 2024
- Prime Minister: Ali Keda; Mohammed al-Bashir
- Deputy: Mustafa Qadid (Head of the Economic Department)
- Succeeded by: Position abolished

Personal details
- Born: 1984 (age 41–42) Aleppo, Syria
- Party: Independent
- Other political affiliations: Hay'at Tahrir al-Sham (until 2025)
- Education: University of Aleppo
- Occupation: Politician, engineer

Basel Abdul Hannan, (Note: Arabic: باسل عبد الحنان) also known as Basel Abdul Aziz (Note: Arabic: باسل عبد العزيز) (born 1984), was the Minister of Economy and Foreign Trade in the Syrian caretaker government between December 2024 and March 2025. He had previously served as Minister of Economy and Resources in the Syrian Salvation Government until December 2024.

Abdul Hannan holds a bachelor’s degree in energy engineering from the University of Aleppo, graduating in 2009. He has also completed advanced courses in economic feasibility studies, strategic planning, and human resource management. Before the Syrian civil war, he worked as a lecturer at the Faculty of Mechanical Engineering at the University of Aleppo and in the engineering industries of Sheikh Najjar, an industrial area in Aleppo.

During the Syrian civil war, Abdul Hannan managed industrial activities in opposition-controlled areas and worked in various economic sectors, including cash management. His expertise led to his appointment as the Minister of Economy and Resources in the third, fourth, and fifth terms of the Syrian Salvation Government.

In December 2024, following the fall of the Assad regime and the decision that ministers of the Salvation Government will serve in the same roles in the transitional government until March 2025, Abdul Hannan began serving as minister of economy and foreign trade in the Syrian caretaker government under prime minister Mohammed al-Bashir. In his new role, he announced plans to implement market liberalization reforms, including dismantling the existing import-export control system and moving toward a free-market economic model. During a meeting with the Damascus Chambers of Commerce, he outlined plans to remove restrictions on imports and allow registered businesses to trade more freely.

== See also ==
- Cabinet of Syria
