= General Authority for Land and Sea Ports =

Syrian government agency

General Authority of Borders and Customs
- الهيئة العامة للحدود والجمارك

Agency overview
- Formed: November 23, 2025; 10 months ago
- Superseding agency: General Authority for Land and Sea Ports
- Jurisdiction: Government of Syria
- Headquarters: Damascus, Syria
- Agency executive: Qutaiba Ahmed Badawi, Director
- Website: gabc.gov.sy

The General Authority of Borders and Customs (Arabic: الهيئة العامة للحدود والجمارك, romanized: al-Hayʾah al-ʿĀmmah lil-Hudud wa-al-jamarik; formerly General Authority for Land and Sea Ports is a Syrian law enforcement agency responsible for controlling international transports to the country, checking goods and passenger movements, and enforcing laws that prevent economical losses due to smuggling offenses. It was established in December 2024 by the Syrian transitional government.

On 18 December 2024, It has issued a decision, signed by its new Director General, Qutaiba Ahmed Badawi to dissolve the customs police in Syria with all its names and formations, to be reconstituted later in a manner that “serves the public interest".

The current director is Qutaiba Ahmed Badawi since 31 December 2024.
