= Syrian transitional government =

Provisional government of Syria since 2025

- 98th government of the Syrian Arab Republic
- 2025–present
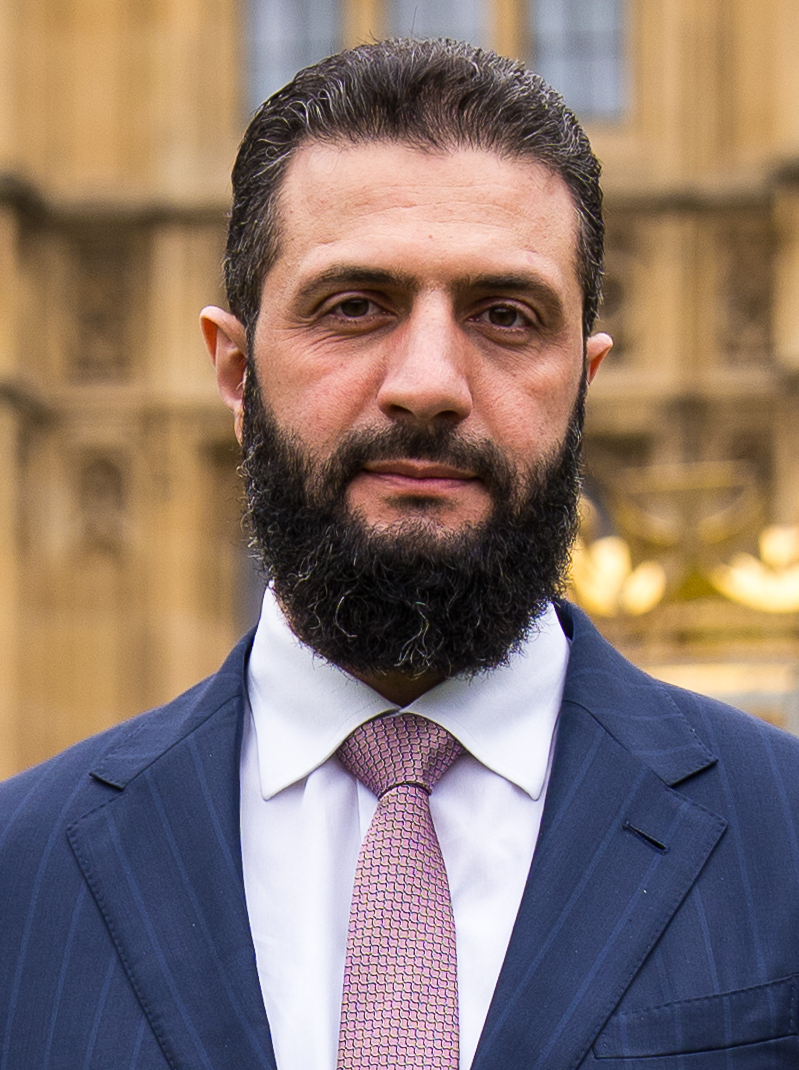
- Syrian president Ahmed al-Sharaa, the head of the Syrian transitional government
- Date formed: 29 March 2025

People and organisations
- President: Ahmed al-Sharaa
- President's history: Leader of Syria (2024–2025)
- Vice President: Vacant
- No. of ministers: 23
- Member parties: ▌Independent

History
- Legislature term: Transitional People's Assembly
- Predecessor: Caretaker

The Syrian transitional government, (Note: Arabic: الحكومة الانتقالية السورية, romanized: al-Ḥukūmah al-Intiqāliyyah as-Sūriyyah) also known as the Ahmed al-Sharaa government, is the current provisional government of Syria. It was established on 29 March 2025 under President Ahmed al-Sharaa and is set to serve for a five-year transitional period under the Constitutional Declaration, which establishes a presidential system. As president, al-Sharaa has the authority to appoint and dismiss ministers and accept their resignations. The government succeeded the Syrian caretaker government, which was headed by Mohammed al-Bashir during the period when al-Sharaa served as Syria's de facto leader and held authority over the caretaker government before his appointment as president.

The government was announced by Ahmed al-Sharaa at a ceremony at the People's Palace in Damascus, where the new ministers were sworn in and delivered speeches outlining their agendas. Two new ministries were formed: the Ministry of Sports and Youth and Ministry of Emergency and Disaster Management. The position of Prime Minister was abolished. The Ministry of Energy was formed from the mergers of the Ministry of Electricity, the Ministry of Oil and Mineral Resources and the Ministry of Water Resources, while the Ministry of Economy and Industry was formed from the mergers of the Ministry of Economy and Foreign Trade, Ministry of Internal Trade and Consumer Protection and the Ministry of Industry. On 9 May 2026, as part of a partial government reshuffle, al-Sharaa appointed Khaled Fawaz Zaarour and Basel al-Suweydan as the Ministers of Information and Agriculture, replacing Hamza al-Mustafa and Amjad Badr respectively. On 19 October 2026, as al-Sharaa appointed Basel Abdul Hannan as the Minister of Industry, Internal Trade and Consumer Protection.

== Background ==
The 2024 Syrian opposition offensives, codenamed "Deterrence of Aggression", were led by Hay'at Tahrir al-Sham and supported by allied Turkish-backed groups in the Syrian National Army. These offensives resulted in the rapid fall of Bashar al-Assad's dictatorship, ending five decades of Assad family rule that began when Hafez al-Assad assumed power in 1970 under the Ba'ath Party following a coup d'état.

After the fall of the Assad regime, Bashar al-Assad's ninth prime minister, Mohammad Ghazi al-Jalali, remained in his post in a caretaker capacity with the support of the opposition and Ahmed al-Sharaa until the formation of the caretaker government, which was led by Mohammed al-Bashir. On 12 February 2025, two major organizations of the former Syrian opposition, the Syrian National Coalition and the Syrian Negotiation Commission, announced their allegiance to the caretaker government. On 11 March 2025, al-Sharaa signed an agreement with Mazloum Abdi, the commander of the Syrian Democratic Forces (SDF), to incorporate SDF-controlled institutions into the state, establish border crossings, and pledge to fight the remnants of the Assad regime. The deadline for the merger was set for the end of 2025.

The government implemented the Constitutional Declaration of the Syrian Arab Republic, a provisional constitution ratified by al-Sharaa on 13 March 2025, establishing the basic law of Syria for a five-year transition period from 2025 to 2030. The Constitutional Declaration sets a presidential system with the executive power at the hands of the president who appoints the ministers, without the position of prime minister.

== Formation ==
Presidential Decree No. 9 of 2025, forming the transitional government

The government was announced by Syrian president Ahmed al-Sharaa at a ceremony at the Presidential Palace in Damascus, in which the new ministers were sworn in and delivered speeches outlining their agendas. Two new ministries were formed: the Ministry of Sports and Youth and Ministry of Emergency and Disaster Management. The post of prime minister was abolished.

Four of the new ministers belonged to minority ethnic groups or religions: Yaarub Bader, an Alawite; Amjad Badr, a Druze; Hind Kabawat, a Christian; and Mohammad Abdul Rahman Tarkou, a Kurd. The government also included figures from different groups of the former Syrian opposition: during the civil war, Mohammed Abu al-Khair Shukri was a member of the Syrian National Coalition, Raed al-Saleh was director of the White Helmets and Hind Kabawat served as deputy head of the Syrian Negotiation Commission in Geneva. The new government was described by some observers as technocratic, with "ministers chosen according to their competences" by President al-Sharaa.

Al-Sharaa also retained Asaad al-Shaibani as Minister of Foreign Affairs and Expatriates and Murhaf Abu Qasra as Minister of Defense.

== Policies ==
=== Possible reforms ===
Syrian president Ahmed al-Sharaa stated that the new government will reform the energy sector for sustainability and reliable electricity, support farmers to ensure food production, revive the industry, protect national products, attract investment, stabilize the economy, strengthen the Syrian pound, and prevent financial manipulation.

On 16 April 2025, Syria's minister of the interior, Anas Khattab, announced that government forces had successfully thwarted an attempted coup by officers loyal to the old regime and that the government would create mechanisms to identify those responsible. The announcement came as part of an increased network of collaboration between the new various security apparatus, from police to military to intelligence. According to Khattab, security forces had been tipped off to the plot, and were able to launch an operation to disrupt it before it could be executed, although exact details of who specifically was involved are scarce.

=== Domestic policies ===
In January 2026, al-Sharaa declared a ceasefire between government forces and the Syrian Democratic Forces. He also recognised Kurdish as one of Syria's national languages and announced the restoration of citizenship to Kurdish Syrians. That same month, interior minister Anas Khattab ordered implementation of the citizenship measure, including for Kurds registered as stateless. The ministry set 5 February as the deadline for the implementation. The measure also directed the state to protect Kurdish culture and language in Syria, and to support Kurdish-language instruction in public and private schools in Kurdish-majority areas.

=== Foreign affairs ===
On 10 April 2025, South Korean Foreign Minister Cho Tae-yul visited Damascus and met with Syrian Foreign Minister Asaad al-Shaibani. During the meeting, both sides signed a formal agreement to establish diplomatic relations, which included plans to open embassies and exchange diplomatic missions. The agreement made Syria the last United Nations member state, outside of North Korea, to establish diplomatic relations with South Korea.

On 18 April, Palestinian President Mahmoud Abbas met with al-Sharaa in Damascus, his first visit to Syria since 2009. They discussed strengthening bilateral ties and regional developments, including Gaza and the two-state solution, and agreed to form joint committees for cooperation.

On 7 May 2025, Syrian president Ahmed al-Sharaa met with President Emmanuel Macron in France. It was his first official visit to a Western country since becoming president. On 14 May, he met with U.S. president Donald Trump in Saudi Arabia, marking the first meeting between American and Syrian heads of state since Bill Clinton and Hafez al-Assad convened in Geneva in 2000. Since then, a number of Western governments have lifted the sanctions on Syria, most notably the United States and the United Kingdom.

On 15 May, al-Shaibani held a meeting with U.S. Secretary of State Marco Rubio in Antalya, Turkey. The meeting took place two days after Trump announced his decision to lift the sanctions on Syria and initiate normalization of bilateral relations. On 23 May, the Trump administration lifted a wide range of sanctions on Syria. On 30 June, Trump signed an executive order lifting sanctions imposed by the United States against Syria except those linked to the Assad family and their associates and related institutions.

On 9 January 2026, during a historic visit to Damascus, European Commission President Ursula von der Leyen met with President al-Sharaa and announced a substantial financial assistance package of approximately €620 million to be disbursed in 2026 and 2027. This visit marked a significant shift in EU-Syria relations following the fall of the Ba'athist-led regime in late 2024. During her stay, von der Leyen described the ongoing clashes in Aleppo between the Syrian government and the Kurdish-led SDF as "worrying".

Later that month in Moscow, al-Sharaa and Russian president Vladimir Putin discussed Syria's future and Russia's military presence in the country, as Russia sought to maintain ties with the transitional government after the fall of Bashar al-Assad.

== Members ==
Portfolio	Minister	Took office	Left office	Party	Ref
Minister of Interior	Anas Khattab	29 March 2025	Incumbent	Independent	
Minister of Defence	Murhaf Abu Qasra	29 March 2025	Incumbent	Independent	
Minister of Foreign Affairs and Expatriates	Asaad al-Shaibani	29 March 2025	Incumbent	Independent	
Minister of Justice	Mazhar al-Wais	29 March 2025	Incumbent	Independent	
Minister of Endowments	Mohammed Abu al-Khair Shukri	29 March 2025	Incumbent	Independent	
Minister of Higher Education and Scientific Research	Marwan al-Halabi	29 March 2025	Incumbent	Independent	
Minister of Social Affairs and Labor	Hind Kabawat	29 March 2025	Incumbent	Independent	
Minister of Energy	Mohammed al-Bashir	29 March 2025	Incumbent	Independent	
Minister of Finance	Mohammed Yisr Barnieh	29 March 2025	Incumbent	Independent	
Minister of Economy and Foreign Trade (Note: Minister of Economy and Industry before 5 November 2026.)	Mohammad Nidal al-Shaar	29 March 2025	5 November 2026	Independent	
Minister of Economy and Foreign Trade	Ahmad Rawad Ramadan	5 November 2026	Incumbent	Independent	
Minister of Health	Musaab Nazzal al-Ali	29 March 2025	Incumbent	Independent	
Minister of Local Administration and Environment	Mohammed Anjrani	29 March 2025	Incumbent	Independent	
Minister of Emergency and Disaster Management	Raed al-Saleh	29 March 2025	Incumbent	Independent	
Minister of Communications and Information Technology	Abdul Salam Haykal	29 March 2025	Incumbent	Independent	
Minister of Agriculture	Amjad Badr	29 March 2025	9 May 2026	Independent	
Minister of Agriculture	Basel al-Suweydan	9 May 2026	Incumbent	Independent	
Minister of Education	Mohammad Abdul Rahman Tarkou	29 March 2025	Incumbent	Independent	
Minister of Public Works and Housing	Mustafa Abdul Razzaq	29 March 2025	Incumbent	Independent	
Minister of Culture	Mohammed Yassin Saleh	29 March 2025	Incumbent	Independent	
Minister of Sports and Youth	Mohammad Sameh Hamedh	29 March 2025	Incumbent	Independent	
Minister of Tourism	Mazen al-Salhani	29 March 2025	Incumbent	Independent	
Minister of Administrative Development	Mohammad Skaf	29 March 2025	Incumbent	Independent	
Minister of Transport	Yaarub Bader	29 March 2025	Incumbent	Independent	
Minister of Information	Hamza al-Mustafa	29 March 2025	9 May 2026	Independent	
Minister of Information	Khaled Fawaz Zaarour	9 May 2026	Incumbent	Independent	
Ministry of Industry, Internal Trade and Consumer Protection	Basel Abdul Hannan	18 October 2026	Incumbent	Independent	

=== Advisors ===
On 5 April 2025, Ahmed al-Sharaa appointed his brother Maher al-Sharaa as Secretary-General to the Presidency, succeeding Abdul Rahman Salama. The position of Secretary-General was reportedly regarded as a high-ranking post within the Syrian state. According to reports, the appointment was seen as nepotistic. On 9 May 2026, he was replaced by former Homs Governor Abdul Rahman al-Aama as Secretary-General. Al-Aama was appointed through a presidential decree issued by Ahmed al-Sharaa. Abdul Rahim Attoun, who served as the head of the HTS sharia council, was appointed head of the Advisory Office for Religious Affairs at the Presidency of the Republic. It is reported that Ahmad Muaffaq Zaidan is the media advisor to President al-Sharaa. Ali Keda was appointed as the Assistant Secretary-General of the Presidency on 26 May 2025.

On 27 August 2026, al-Sharaa appointed Mazloum Abdi, the former commander-in-chief of the Syrian Democratic Forces, as Adviser to the Presidency of the Republic. On 18 October 2026, al-Sharaa appointed Omar Samer al-Halabi as Adviser for Economic Affairs to the Presidency of the Republic, alongside as a member of the Supreme Council for Economic Development and as chairman of the board of directors of the Sovereign Fund.

Portfolio	Name	Took office	Left office
Secretary-General to the Presidency	Abdul Rahman al-Aama	9 May 2025	Incumbent
Assistant Secretary-General to the Presidency for the Cabinet Affairs	Ali Keda	26 May 2025	Incumbent
Head of the Advisory Office for Religious Affairs at the Presidency of the Republic	Abdel Rahim Attoun	18 May 2025	Incumbent
Adviser to the Presidency for the Media Affairs	Ahmad Muaffaq Zaidan	22 August 2025	Incumbent
Adviser to the Presidency of the Republic	Mazloum Abdi	27 August 2026	Incumbent
Adviser for Economic Affairs to the Presidency of the Republic	Omar Samer al-Halabi	8 October 2026	Incumbent
Advisor for Economic and Financial Affairs at the Presidency	Mohammad Nidal al-Shaar	5 November 2026	Incumbent

== Commissions ==
=== Justice ===
On 17 May 2025, al-Sharaa signed Presidential Decrees No. 19 and No. 20, appointing Abdulbaset Abdullatif and Mohammad Reda Jalkhi as heads of the commission. They were given 30 days to form a working team and draft the internal regulations required for the commission's operation, leading to the establishment of the National Commissions for the Missing and Transitional Justice.

== Reactions ==
=== Domestic ===
The Democratic Autonomous Administration of North and East Syria has since said it will not adhere to the decisions of the newly-formed government, alleging that its composition allowed a single faction to maintain control and did not represent the diversity of Syria.

Sheikh Hammoud al-Hinnawi, a prominent Druze community leader, welcomed the formation of the new Syrian government, commending the conciseness and conduct of the ministers' speeches.

=== International ===
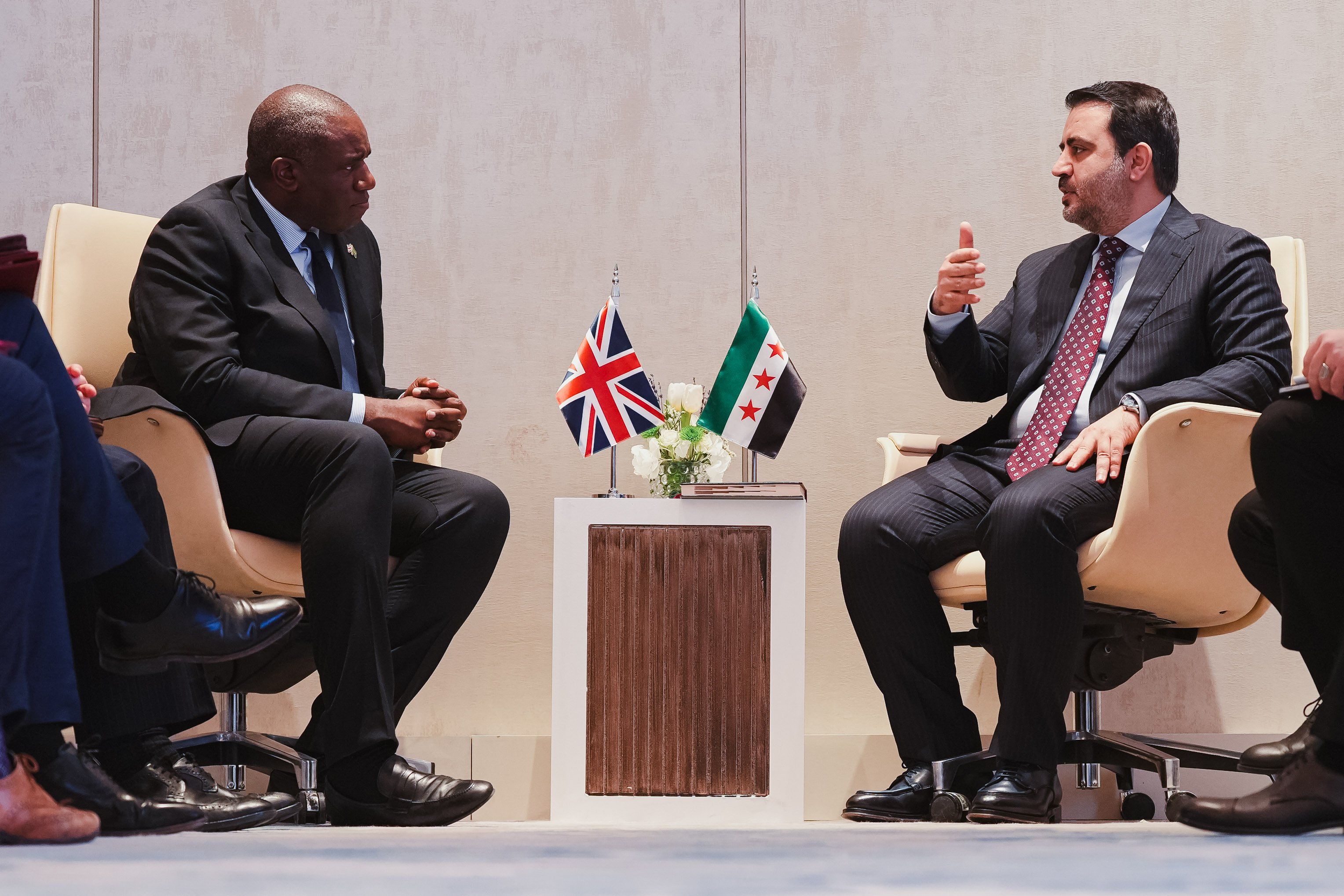
Syrian Foreign Minister Asaad al-Shaibani (right) with UK Foreign Secretary David Lammy in Riyadh, Saudi Arabia, 12 January 2025

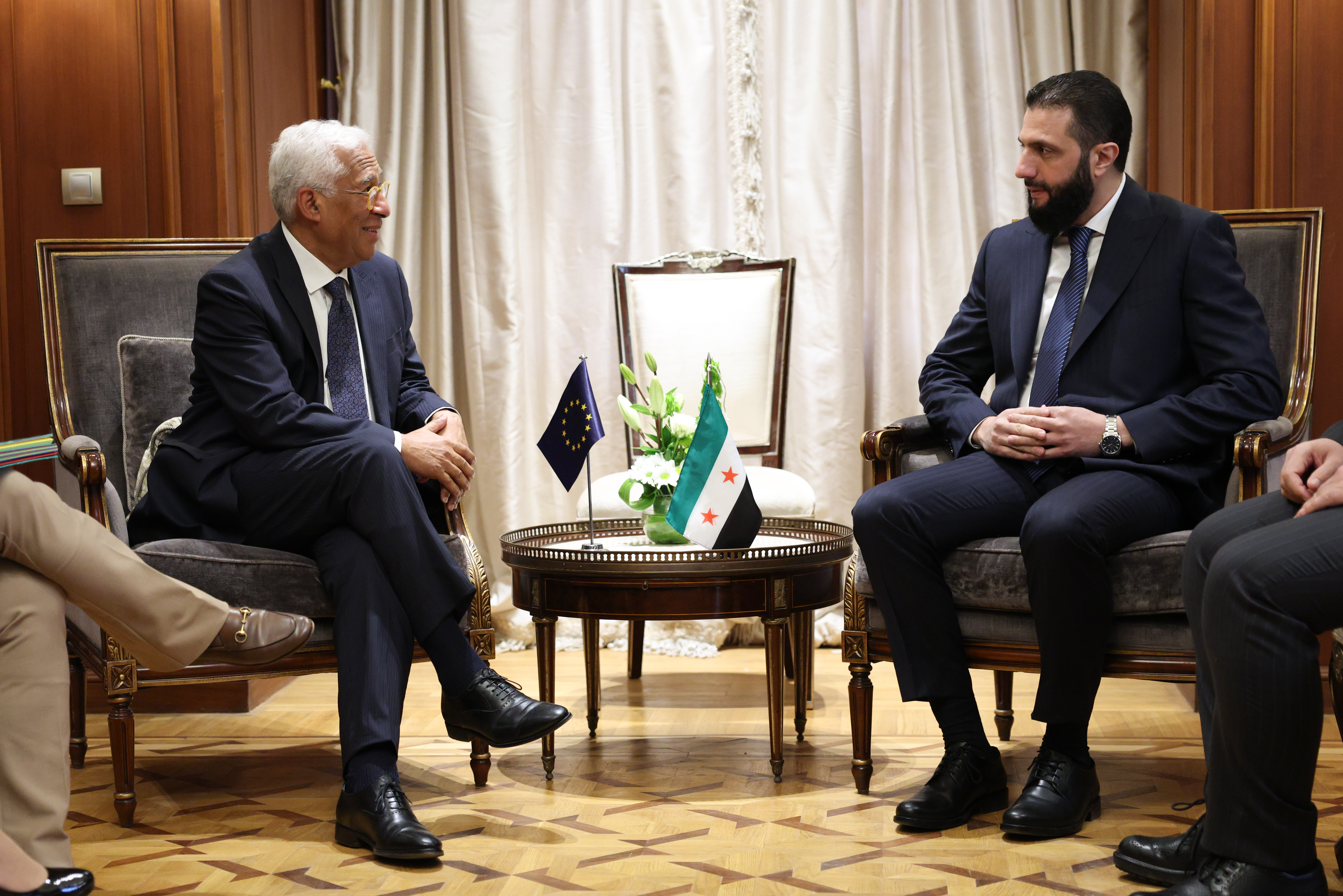
President of the European Council, António Costa (left), with Syrian President Ahmed al-Sharaa at the Emergency Summit of the League of Arab States on Gaza, 3 March 2025

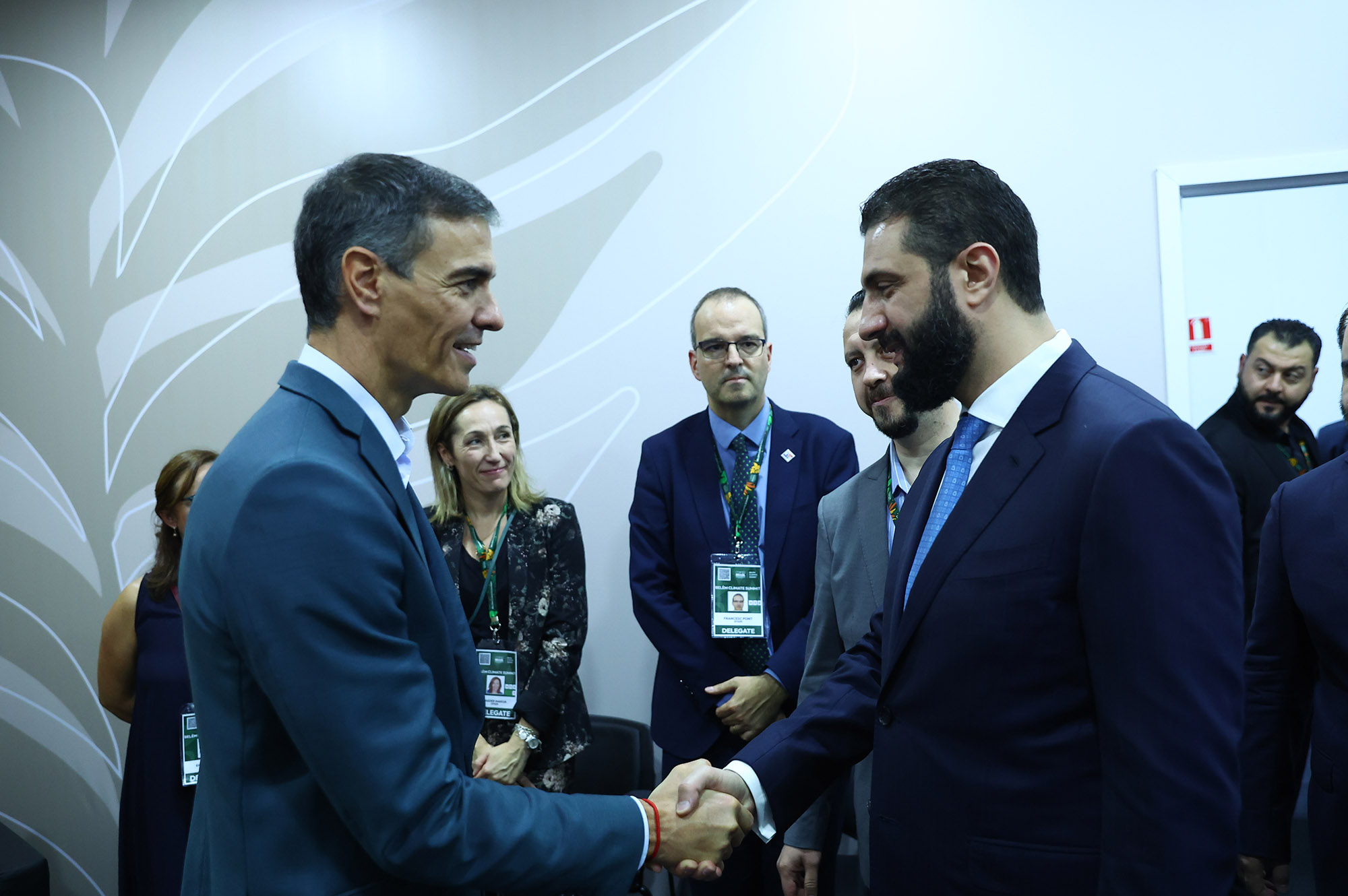
Spanish Prime Minister Pedro Sánchez and Syrian President al-Sharaa during the COP30 summit in Brazil, 7 November 2025

==== Governments ====
- Saudi Arabia: The Saudi Ministry of Foreign Affairs congratulated the establishment of the new government and affirmed its aim to cooperate and work with the transitional government "in a manner that embodies the fraternal and historical relations between the two countries and strengthens relations in all fields".
- Jordan: Jordanian Ministry of Foreign Affairs and Expatriates welcomed the announcement of the new Syrian government, and Ministry Spokesperson Sufyan Qudah said that Jordan intends to deepen cooperation with the new government.
- Turkey: The Turkish Ministry of Foreign Affairs welcomed the formation of the new Syrian government, saying that this "stresses the Syrian administration's commitment to achieving a comprehensive Syrian-led political transition process". The ministry also said that Turkey intends to continue to support the Syrian political process and also called for lifting sanctions unconditionally.
- Qatar: Qatar's Ministry of Foreign Affairs welcomed the announcement made by the Syrian president of the formation of the new government, adding that Qatar intends to strengthen relations between the two countries and emphasizing Qatar's support for the new government to "achieve the aspirations of the fraternal Syrian people for stability, development, and prosperity".
- Kuwait: Kuwait's Ministry of Foreign Affairs expressed Kuwait's welcome of the formation of the new Syrian government, wishing "success in meeting Syrians' aspirations in security, safety, and prosperity".
- United Arab Emirates: The UAE's Ministry of Foreign Affairs welcomed the announcement of the formation of the new Syrian government. Additionally, UAE officials such as president Sheikh Mohamed bin Zayed, prime minister and ruler of Dubai Sheikh Mohammed bin Rashid, and vice president Sheikh Mansour bin Zayed congratulated the Syrian president on the formation of a new government.
- Germany: German Special Envoy to Syria Stefan Schnecke announced that Germany welcomes the announcement of a new government in Syria. German Foreign Office spokesperson Kathrin Deschauer later said in a press conference that the formation of the new government was a step in the right direction for future, inclusive political reform.
- United Kingdom: British Parliamentary Under-Secretary of State (Middle East, Afghanistan and Pakistan) Hamish Falconer announced that the UK welcomes the formation of the new Syrian government.
- France: France's Ministry for Europe and Foreign Affairs said that France welcomes the formation of a new government in Syria, stating France's support for a "peaceful and inclusive political transition which guarantees the protection of Syria's pluralism and the rights of all Syrians".
- Norway: Norwegian Minister of Foreign Affairs Espen Barth Eide said that Norway welcomes the formation of a new Syrian government, stressing that "inclusive governance is essential for Syria's future, development, and prosperity".
- Palestine: Palestinian president Mahmoud Abbas congratulated the Syrian president on the announcement of the formation of a new Syrian government.
- Poland: The Polish Embassy in Syria said that Poland welcomed the formation of the new government.
- Spain: Spain's Ministry of Foreign Affairs welcomed the announcement of the new Syrian government, seeing it as "a step forward toward a peaceful Syria that guarantees unity and territorial integrity of the country".
- Italy: The Italian Ministry of Foreign Affairs welcomed the formation of the new Syrian government, adding that Italy is ready to contribute towards reconstruction and support an inclusive political process.
- United States: U.S. State Department Spokeswoman Tammy Bruce considered the formation of the new Syrian government a positive step but stated that sanctions would not be eased until progress was made on key priorities, including counterterrorism.
- Iraq: Iraqi Prime Minister Mohammed Shia' Al Sudani, during a phone call with Syrian president al-Sharaa to discuss recent developments in the region, congratulated the Syrian people on the formation of the new government and reaffirmed Iraq's commitment to respecting Syrian political developments.
- Ukraine: The Ministry of Foreign Affairs of Ukraine welcomed the formation of the new transitional Syrian government, interpreting this as "another important stage on the way to building a peaceful and democratic country". The Ministry also expressed Ukraine's support for Syrian territorial integrity and sovereignty.
- Malaysia: Malaysian Prime Minister Anwar Ibrahim made a phone call to Syrian President al-Sharaa to congratulate him on the formation of the new Syrian government, adding that Malaysia plans on enhancing bilateral (particularly economic) ties with Syria, and expressed his wishes for "further prosperity, stability, and prosperity for the Syrian people".
- South Korea: Foreign Minister Cho Tae-yul met with President Ahmed al-Sharaa and extended his congratulations on the successful launch of the new government formed through inclusive representation following the end of the Assad regime.

==== Organizations ====
- European Union: High Representative Kaja Kallas, Commissioner Dubravka Šuica, and Commissioner Hadja Lahbib issued a joint statement welcoming the formation of the new Syrian transitional government, stating the EU's readiness to support a Syrian-led political process, engage with the new government, and respect for Syrian territorial unity, sovereignty, and integrity.
- Organization of Islamic Cooperation: The OIC's Secretary General Hissein Brahim Taha congratulated the Syrian government and people on the formation of the new Syrian government.
- United Nations: UN spokesperson Stéphane Dujarric said that UN Special Envoy for Syria Geir Pedersen "encourages the ongoing efforts of Syrian authorities toward a credible, inclusive, and sustainable transition in terms of governance, and also in terms of the next transitional steps". The official United Nations list of heads of state and government of member states was updated in July 2025 to list Ahmed al-Sharaa as "President of the Syrian Arab Republic"
- Organisation for the Prohibition of Chemical Weapons: Director general Fernando Arias sent a congratulatory message to Syrian president al-Sharaa on the formation of the new Syrian government.

== See also ==
- Elections in Syria
- Government of Syria
- List of massacres during the Syrian transitional government
- Syrian civil war
- United Nations Security Council Resolution 2254
- Foreign relations of Syria
