= Ebaa News Agency =

Syrian news outlet

Ebaa News Agency وكالة إباء الإخبارية
- Available in: Arabic, English, Turkish
- Founder: Hayat Tahrir al-Sham
- Website: ebaa-agency.com
- Launched: March 2017
- Current status: Inactive

The Ebaa News Agency is a media outlet linked to Hayat Tahrir al-Sham and reports on events surrounding the group, and the civil administration linked to the group, the Syrian Salvation Government.

== Background ==
The Ebaa News Agency was created in March 2017 and has been described as mirroring ISIL's media such as the Amaq News Agency, with summaries and reports on the group's activities such as attacks and military operations, making it effective for the group's branding and advertising. The agency is also considered a descendant of al-Nusra's own media apparatus that functioned similar to both Amaq and Ebaa, with correspondents and having a detached nature from the group.

Ebaa News Agency also covers events related to the HTS linked Syrian Salvation Government and maintains a weekly magazine that was launched in June 2018 with articles and opinion pieces. Along with a weekly magazine, summaries of events related to HTS, the Ebaa News Agency also publishes infographics and statistics relating to HTS' exploits and operations. The Ebaa News Agency also publishes video footage of combat, HTS policing activities in areas under its control including executions, and displays of equipment captured by HTS.

== History ==
In February 2018, Ebaa News Agency published photographs of several pieces of captured equipment by Hayat Tahrir al-Sham from Ahrar al-Sham after the former took control of the latter's base during the Syrian Liberation Front–Tahrir al-Sham conflict, the display included photos of self-propelled artillery, tanks and APCs belonging to Ahrar al-Sham, HTS claimed via the Ebaa News Agency to have captured 20 tanks, 4 technicals and several artillery pieces.

In April 2018, Ebaa News Agency published footage of HTS fighters engaged in combat against ISIL in the Yarmouk Camp, a suburb in southern Damascus, the footage included point-of-view shots from HTS fighters with helmet cameras, Ebaa also released photos of a tunnel dug by ISIL with captions saying "network of tunnels dug by the Kharijites", and also claimed that HTS expelled ISIL from the area took full control of the tunnels dug by the group.

In June 2018, the Ebaa News Agency announced that HTS had arrested Saad al-Hunayti, a Jordanian scholar and friend of the Jihadist ideologue and cleric Abu Muhammad al-Maqdisi, who had traveled to Syria in 2014 to mediate tensions between ISIL and al-Nusra, and later joined ISIL due to a lack of implementation of Sharia by al-Nusra, until fleeing back to rebel held areas after a series of defeats by ISIL, he was arrested on the grounds of being affiliated with ISIL and allegedly orchestrating assassinations in Idlib. News of his arrest was condemned by Maqdisi and he demanded that HTS release Hunayti.

On 29 December 2018, Ebaa News Agency published a statement in favor the Taliban's peace talks with the United States, saying that the talks were necessary in order for the United States with withdraw from Afghanistan, and that the Taliban has the advantage.

In July 2019, the Ebaa News Agency in its weekly magazine published an article saying taking selfies was a security risk, because the photos could contain metadata such was location, the model of the phone used and the time the photo as taken. The article also published information explaining how to reduce these risks such as turning off settings and getting apps that remove this information.
