= Samarda =

Samarda Samardha
- village
- Location within Madhya Pradesh Location within India
- Coordinates: 23.3322478°N 77.5827175°E
- Country: India
- State: Madhya Pradesh
- District: Bhopal
- Tehsil: Huzur
- Elevation: 463 m (1,519 ft)

Population (2011)
  - Total: 372
- Time zone: UTC+5:30 (IST)
- ISO 3166 code: IN-MP
- 2011 census code: 482430

Samarda, also spelled Samardha, is a village in the Bhopal district of Madhya Pradesh, India. It is located in the Huzur tehsil and the Phanda block.

The village is the site of an ecotourism operations supported by Government of Madhya Pradesh. It is popular with Bhopal-based corporate staff for team-building exercises.

== Demographics ==
According to the 2011 census of India, Samarda has 86 households. The effective literacy rate (i.e. the literacy rate of population excluding children aged 6 and below) is 78.81%.

Demographics (2011 Census)
	Total	Male	Female
Population	372	211	161
Children aged below 6 years	70	39	31
Scheduled caste	0	0	0
Scheduled tribe	36	20	16
Literates	238	155	83
Workers (all)	152	121	31
Main workers (total)	106	99	7
Main workers: Cultivators	21	21	0
Main workers: Agricultural labourers	44	43	1
Main workers: Household industry workers	0	0	0
Main workers: Other	41	35	6
Marginal workers (total)	46	22	24
Marginal workers: Cultivators	3	2	1
Marginal workers: Agricultural labourers	38	16	22
Marginal workers: Household industry workers	0	0	0
Marginal workers: Others	5	4	1
Non-workers	220	90	130
