= Muhambal =

Muhambal محمبل Mhambal, Mahambel
- Town
- Location in Syria
- Coordinates: 35°47′2″N 36°28′10″E
- Country: Syria
- Governorate: Idlib
- District: Ariha
- Subdistrict: Muhambal

Population (2004)
  - Total: 4,970
- Time zone: UTC+2 (EET)
  - Summer (DST): UTC+3 (EEST)

Muhambal is a town in the western part of Syria’s Idlib province. It is located in a predominantly agricultural area known for the cultivation of olives, grains, and other crops. Before the outbreak of the Syrian war, Muhambal was a relatively quiet place where daily life revolved around farming, local trade, and strong social ties among families.

Since the beginning of the conflict in Syria, Muhambal, like many other towns and villages in Idlib, has suffered severe consequences. The town was repeatedly affected by violence, resulting in damage to homes, infrastructure, and public facilities. Many residents were forced to flee their homes in search of safety in other parts of Syria or abroad. Despite these circumstances, some people remained or later returned, determined to rebuild their lives.

Today, Muhambal symbolizes the resilience of the civilian population in Idlib. The town continues to face major challenges, including limited access to healthcare, education, and basic services, but local communities and humanitarian organizations strive to provide support where possible. Muhambal therefore remains an example of how ordinary people try to endure amid prolonged uncertainty and conflict.
