= Syrian caretaker government =

2024–2025 provisional Syrian government

- 97th government of the Syrian Arab Republic
- 2024–2025
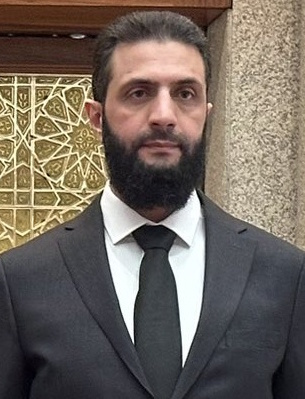
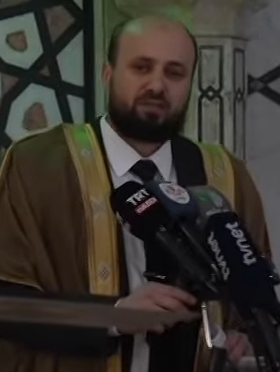
- Syrian president Ahmed al-Sharaa (left) and former prime minister Mohammed al-Bashir (right)
- Date formed: 8 December 2024
- Date dissolved: 29 March 2025

People and organisations
- De facto leader: President: Ahmed al-Sharaa (Note: Ahmed al-Sharaa served as the Head of State of Syria (as the de facto leader of Syria) from 8 December 2024 to 29 January 2025, and has been the President of Syria since 29 January 2025)
- Prime Minister: Mohammad Ghazi al-Jalali (Note: As caretaker prime minister from 8 December 2024 until 10 December 2024); Mohammed al-Bashir
- No. of ministers: 23 (excluding the prime minister)
- Member parties: ▌Hay'at Tahrir al-Sham (until 29 January 2025)
- Status in legislature: Provisional

History
- Predecessor: al-Jalali (Ba'athist Syria, National Progressive Front); 7th SSG Cabinet (Hay'at Tahrir al-Sham); (Syrian opposition) Interim (Syrian National Revolutionary Coalition)
- Successor: Transitional

The Syrian caretaker government (Arabic: حكومة تصريف الأعمال السورية, romanized: Ḥukūmat Taṣrīf al-Aʿmāl as-Sūriyyah), or the Mohammed al-Bashir government, was the provisional government of Syria. It was established in December 2024 by the Syrian opposition after the Syrian General Command appointed Mohammed al-Bashir as prime minister, replacing Mohammad Ghazi al-Jalali on 10 December. This came after the fall of the Assad regime and the exile of former Syrian president Bashar al-Assad. On 8 December 2024, hours after the fall of Damascus, Mohammad Ghazi al-Jalali, the outgoing prime minister and last head of government of the Ba'athist regime, agreed to lead the transitional government in a caretaking capacity. He then transferred power to Mohammed al-Bashir, prime minister of the Syrian Salvation Government (SSG), two days later.

On 29 January 2025, Ahmed al-Sharaa was appointed as the president of Syria for the transitional period during the Syrian Revolution Victory Conference in Damascus, after serving as the de facto leader following the fall of the Assad regime. As president, al-Sharaa announced plans to issue a "constitutional declaration" as a legal reference following the repeal of the 2012 constitution of Ba'athist Syria.

On 13 March, he signed the Constitutional Declaration for a five-year transitional period, enshrining Islamic law as a source of jurisprudence and promising to protect the rights of all of Syria’s ethnic and religious groups. On 29 March, the caretaker administration was succeeded by the Syrian transitional government.

== Background ==
On 27 November 2024, Hay'at Tahrir al-Sham (HTS) announced that it had launched an offensive, dubbed "Deterrence of Aggression," against pro-government forces in western Aleppo Governorate. The offensive was led by HTS and supported mainly by the Syrian National Army as part of the ongoing Syrian civil war that began with the Syrian Revolution in 2011. This was the first military offensive launched by opposition forces in the Syrian civil war since the Idlib ceasefire in March 2020. On 29 November, HTS entered Aleppo and seized control of most of the city as pro-government forces collapsed. The following day, opposition forces swiftly advanced, taking control of numerous towns and villages while pro-government troops fell apart. They then pushed toward Hama in central Syria, ultimately capturing it on 5 December.

By 6 December, the newly formed Southern Operations Room seized Daraa and Suwayda in a southern offensive, while HTS advanced further south toward Homs. The US-backed Syrian Free Army took control of Palmyra in the southeast of the country. On 7 December, Southern Operations Room forces advanced into the Rif Dimashq Governorate from the south, reaching within 10 kilometres (6.2 mi) of Damascus. Rebel forces advanced towards Damascus while simultaneously launching an offensive into the city of Homs, eventually reaching the suburbs of the capital.

On 8 December, the Assad regime finally collapsed. The capture of Damascus marked the end of the Assad family's rule, which had governed Syria as a hereditary sectarian totalitarian regime since Hafez al-Assad assumed power in 1970 following a coup d'état. As a rebel coalition moved closer to Damascus, reports indicated that Bashar al-Assad had fled the capital by plane to Russia, where he joined his exiled family and was granted political asylum by the Russian government. After his departure, opposition forces announced their victory on state television. At the same time, Russia's Ministry of Foreign Affairs confirmed his resignation and departure from Syria.

== Formation ==
=== Transition of power ===
Ahmed al-Sharaa, leader of the Syrian Salvation Government, stated on Telegram that Syrian public institutions would not immediately be taken over by force and would instead temporarily be held by the Syrian prime minister, Mohammad Ghazi al-Jalali, until the full political transition was completed. Al-Jalali announced in a social media video that he planned to stay in Damascus and cooperate with the Syrian people while expressing hope that Syria could become "a normal country" and begin to engage in diplomacy with other nations. Jalali also expressed his readiness to "extend its hand" to the opposition.

Hadi al-Bahra, president of the National Coalition of Syrian Revolutionary and Opposition Forces, said that an 18-month transitional period was needed to establish "a safe, neutral, and quiet environment" for free elections. This period includes six months to draft a new constitution. This transition, according to al-Bahra, should be in line with United Nations Security Council Resolution 2254.

On 9 December 2024, following the fall of the Assad regime, the prime minister of the Syrian Salvation Government, Mohammed al-Bashir, was tasked with forming a transitional government after meeting with al-Sharaa and outgoing Syrian prime minister al-Jalali to coordinate the transfer of power. The next day, al-Bashir was officially appointed by the Syrian General Command as the prime minister of the transitional government. In a televised statement, al-Bashir announced that officials from the Salvation Government met with representatives of the previous government to facilitate the handover of power and that his cabinet from the Salvation Government would assume their corresponding roles in the transitional government.

=== Integration of other Syrian authorities ===
Agreement stipulating the integration of the Syrian Democratic Forces (SDF) into the institutions of the Syrian Arab Republic, 10 March 2025.

On 11 December 2024, the Syrian transitional government began negotiations to dissolve all non-state armed groups in the country. The Democratic Autonomous Administration of North and East Syria (DAANES) remained autonomous after the fall of the Assad regime and its military wing the Syrian Democratic Forces (SDF) would clash with the new military, which included former SNA factions. Leaders of the Southern Operations Room also met with al-Sharaa on 11 December and expressed interest in "coordination", a "unified effort", and "cooperation" without stating that they would support the HTS transitional government.

On 18 December, the National Coalition of Syrian Revolutionary and Opposition Forces, which operates the Syrian Interim Government in Turkish-occupied zones, expressed its support for al-Bashir's government. The SNC called for a national conference and for the formation of a government that would be "inclusive of all groups" and "represent all Syrian components".

On 29 December 2024, Ahmed al-Sharaa stated in a televised interview that Syrian Democratic Forces would be integrated into Syria's Ministry of Defense and that negotiations were underway. In response, the SDF said it was ready to cooperate with al-Sharaa to be the "nucleus of the Syrian army".

On 18 January 2025, Akram Mahshoush, head of the al-Hasakah Elders Council, stated that a civilian delegation was being formed to "visit Damascus and discuss the state of civil and service institutions".

On 30 January 2025, Abdurrahman Mustafa, head of the Syrian Interim Government in northern Syria congratulated Ahmed Al-Sharaa as president, it was also announced that the SIG was to be at the disposal of the transitional government. The transitional government started to deploy its forces into the areas under the SIG control in February, as the Syrian National Army started to integrate into the newly formed Syrian Army. Government forces started to dismantle barracks and other military infrastructure in the area.

On 12 February 2025, al-Shaara met with representatives of the Syrian National Coalition and the Syrian Negotiation Commission, including their respective presidents Hadi al-Bahra and Bader Jamous. It was announced that both organizations would dissolve within the new authorities. On the same day, Minister for Foreign Affairs Asaad al-Shaibani announced that a new government would be formed by 1 March, which "will represent the Syrian people as much as possible and take its diversity into account".

On 10 March 2025, an agreement was signed to integrate the SDF into the structures of the transitional government.

=== Women in government ===
The initial prime minister and cabinet, together consisted of twelve men and no women. As of 21 December 2024, it had extended to sixteen men and no women. On 22 December, Aisha al-Dibs, a human rights activist, was appointed as the first woman minister in the cabinet, as Head of Women's Affairs. On 30 December, Maysaa Sabreen was appointed as Syria's first female head of the Central Bank of Syria. Sabreen had been the first deputy director of the bank during the final stages of Assad's rule. On 31 December 2024, the caretaker administration appointed Muhsina al-Mahithawi, a Druze female activist who participated in the anti-Assad Southern Syrian protests, as governor of Suwayda Governorate. For comparison, the previous Ba'athist cabinet had three female ministers, Lubanah Mshaweh, Diala Barakat, and Lamia Chakkour, out of 29 ministers.

On 18 December, HTS spokesperson Obaida Arnaout gave an interview in which he stated that "the essence of women and their biological and psychological nature do not fit all positions, such as the Ministry of Defense," and, "As for women's representation in ministerial and parliamentary roles, we believe that this matter is premature and should be left to legal and constitutional experts who will work on rethinking the structure of the new Syrian state." There was widespread criticism online in reaction to Arnaout's statement. Milena Zain al-Din from Damascus University disagreed with the spokesperson's statement, stating, "We, the young women and women of Syria, are activists, politicians, human rights advocates, journalists, economists, academics, workers, and homemakers. Obeida Arnaout's rhetoric is unacceptable. The Syrian woman, who has struggled and endured alongside millions of Syrian women, is not waiting for you to choose a place or role for her that aligns with your mindset for building our nation."

Following the controversy of Arnaout's comments, the transitional government announced the establishment of the Women's Affairs Office four days later and Aisha al-Dibs' appointment as a minister of the Offices. A week later, on 29 December, al-Dibs' statements on women's rights, in which she stated that she would "not accept any opinion of feminist organizations or others that contradict the government's ideological orientation, or are incompatible with the government model" were widely criticized by Syrians.

In early 2025, Arnaout made another statement in an interview with a Lebanese TV channel, where he stated that, according to him, though women "certainly have the right to learn and receive education in any field", that "for women to assume judicial authority" would be placed under "closer examination and study by specialists". Having doubled down on his stance on women having "obstacles" in the form of "emotional and physiological limitations", this raised concerns that female court judges could be dismissed from their positions and forced to end their legal careers due to the fundamental restructuring of the country's legal system along HTS lines, which could forbid women from employment in the judiciary.

When asked about the situation, Aisha al-Dibs stated that she refuses to comment on the future role of women in the judiciary, which would be determined by a new constitution, except that Syria's future judicial system will be based on Islamic law. Al-Dibs specifically rejected the notion of a secular or civilian judicial system, saying that she would "not open the way for those that disagree with her" when asked if women's rights organizations in the country would be allowed autonomy, accepting only those organizations, whose support aligns with the HTS vision for Syria.

== Policies ==
=== Economic reforms ===
The Minister for Economy and Foreign Trade, Basel Abdul Hannan, stated that there were plans to shift from a rather state-controlled economic model towards a free-market model and liberalization of import-export controls. Registration with the Damascus Chambers of Commerce would be considered sufficient authorization to import goods, and the previously required approvals and permissions from the Central Bank of Syria (CBS) would no longer be needed. Business leaders interviewed by Reuters described the promised changes as encouraging. The government stated that reconstruction investment was a priority, with civil war damage estimated in the tens of billions of US dollars. A source from the central bank and two commercial bank sources, speaking with Reuters, said that on 10 December, banks would reopen and that staff had been asked to return. In late January 2025, Basel Abdul Hannan also stated that the government was planning a shift to a "competitive free-market economy" through the abolition of regulations, mass privatization of state-owned companies and public sector cuts. The changes, described as encouraging investment and fighting corruption, were met with protests from people who feared a "sectarian purge".

The Minister for Oil and Mineral Resources told employees to return to work the same day, with Deutsche Welle stating that the ministry had added "protection would be provided to ensure their safety". The Minister for Transport said that Syrian airspace would be reopened to air traffic and added that it would announce the resumption of Damascus and Aleppo international airports. On 16 December the Central Bank abolished the pre-existing import financing platform and announced that importers could finance the import of materials through their sources if they did not conflict with domestic and international money-laundering laws. The CBS said importers no longer needed to visit the bank or obtain approval for importing goods and notified that exports no longer required obtaining a prior "export pledge". That week it was reported that the Syrian pound had appreciated against foreign currencies; reaching 10,000 Syrian pounds to the United States dollar in some areas due to the return of displaced people in northern regions and diaspora, leading to increased amounts of foreign currency inflows. This resulted in the prices of commodities, including foodstuffs, decreasing. The Central Bank of Syria raised the buying exchange rate to 15,000 Syrian pounds to the United States dollar, 15,760.50 pounds to the Euro, and 428.97 pounds to the Turkish lira. On 18 December the CBS said that ATM and electronic payment services were resumed, and directed banks to monitor withdrawal operations for what it said were temporary measures.

=== Administrative reforms ===
The transitional government began implementing administrative reforms immediately after taking control of Damascus. Mohammad Yasser Ghazal, a technocrat from the Syrian Salvation Government, was appointed to oversee the restructuring of the Damascus governorate, with plans to serve as city council president. The new administration began reviewing departmental functions and addressing issues of bureaucratic inefficiency inherited from the previous government.

Initial reforms focused on streamlining government services and addressing corruption. The transitional authorities found numerous inefficient departments and positions, including redundant administrative divisions. The new government emphasized the digitization of services, citing the example of ID processing, which they had already implemented in Idlib. They also began addressing issues of phantom jobs and systemic corruption that had developed under the previous administration, where government employees had been receiving approximately $25 per month in salary; which are to be increased to SSG government minimum wages of $100.

The administrative transition included meetings between outgoing department heads and new officials to understand and reform existing bureaucratic structures. Prime Minister Mohammed al-Bashir convened meetings between SSG ministers and former regime officials to facilitate the transfer of power to the new caretaker government. The transitional government includes numerous senior officials from Idlib governorate, which Reuters said raised concerns about inclusiveness from among opposition sources. Policemen from Idlib were brought to Damascus to direct traffic, while on 13 December the transitional government's Military Operations Command declared a curfew in Homs Governorate.

In late January 2025, five interim ministers interviewed by Reuters introduced plans to 'shrink the state', by firing a third of all public sector workers while sending others on leave while their employment status is being 're-evaluated'. The remaining state employees were told that their salaries would be increased by 400%.

=== Constitutional changes and political transition ===
A spokesman of the transitional government speaking to Agence France-Presse said that during the government's three-month term, the constitution and the parliament would remain suspended. Also, a "judicial and human rights committee" would be established to review the constitution before making amendments. Al-Sharaa stated to Al Jazeera Arabic that the choices of governance will be discussed among a group of experts; then, public elections would be held to make the final choice.

On 29 December 2024, Syria TV reported that preparations were underway for a National Conference of 1,200 representatives for which the date has not been decided yet. Syria TV said that during the National Conference, the constitutional drafting committee would be announced and that during the conference, the People's Assembly of Syria and all armed factions including Hay'at Tahir al-Sham (HTS) would be dissolved, leading to the restructuring of a new national army. Later that day, al-Sharaa stated that elections could take up to 4 years to be organized, with the need to conduct a census beforehand.

On 29 January 2025, al-Sharaa was appointed President of Syria by the Syrian General Command for the transitional period during the Syrian Revolution Victory Conference in Damascus, after serving as the de facto leader following the fall of the Assad regime. As president, al-Sharaa announced plans to issue a "constitutional declaration" as a legal reference following the dissolution of the Assad-era constitution. Hassan Abdul Ghani, spokesman for the Military Operations Command, announced the abolition of the Assad-era constitution and the suspension of all exceptional laws. He also announced the dissolution of the Syrian Arab Socialist Ba'ath Party and other member parties of the National Progressive Front bloc, as well as the disbanding of all armed factions, political groups, and civilian revolutionary bodies, which will be merged into state institutions. Additionally, he announced the formation of an Interim Legislative Council until a permanent constitution is approved and enacted.

On 13 March 2025, President al-Sharaa signed a transitional constitution that enshrines Islamic law as the main source of jurisprudence and will remain in effect for five years.

=== Foreign affairs ===
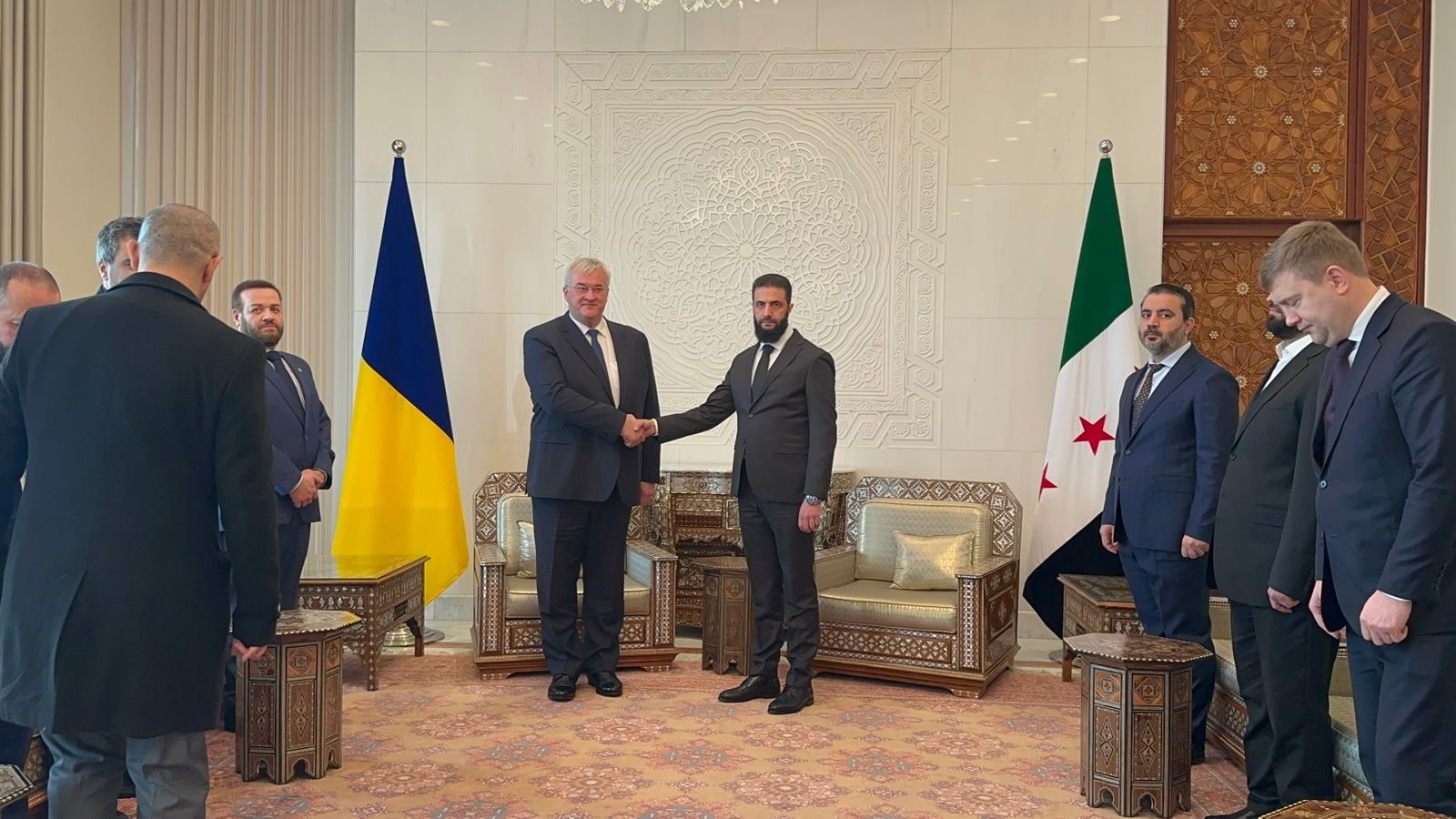
Ukraine announced plans to restore diplomatic relations with Syria, which were severed in 2022 due to the al-Assad regime's recognition of pro-Russia separatists. (Pictured: Ahmed al-Sharaa meeting with Ukrainian foreign minister Andrii Sybiha on 30 December 2024.)

After the fall of Bashar al-Assad, the governments of Egypt, Iraq, Saudi Arabia, the United Arab Emirates, Jordan, Bahrain, Oman, Turkey, Italy and France resumed diplomatic missions in Syria. The new government met diplomats from France, Germany, the United Kingdom, and the European Union in the days immediately following the fall of the al-Assad regime. They met with diplomats from the United States on 20 December 2024.

Additionally, Israel has occupied the Golan Heights since the Six-Day War in 1967. There have been various settlement schemes in the region, and it is not clear if the new Syrian government is planning to join the Abraham Accords soon.

Belarus, North Korea and the partially recognized state of Abkhazia evacuated their embassy personnel on 15 December 2024. It is unknown if the new Syrian government plans to restore diplomatic relations with Georgia, which were severed in 2018 under the Assad regime. Ukraine plans to restore relations with Syria under the new regime, which were cut in 2022 after the previous regime recognized the quasi-states of the Donetsk People's Republic and the Luhansk People's Republic, which were annexed into Russia later that year.

The first official foreign visit of a delegation of the Interim Government was to Saudi Arabia in the first days of 2025. The Syrian interim delegation was headed by the Ministers for Foreign Affairs and Defense, as well as the head of the General Intelligence Directorate, Anas Khattab. The visit came after al-Sharaa stated in an interview for the Saudi-owned Al Arabiya that Saudi Arabia is to have a "large role in Syria's future".

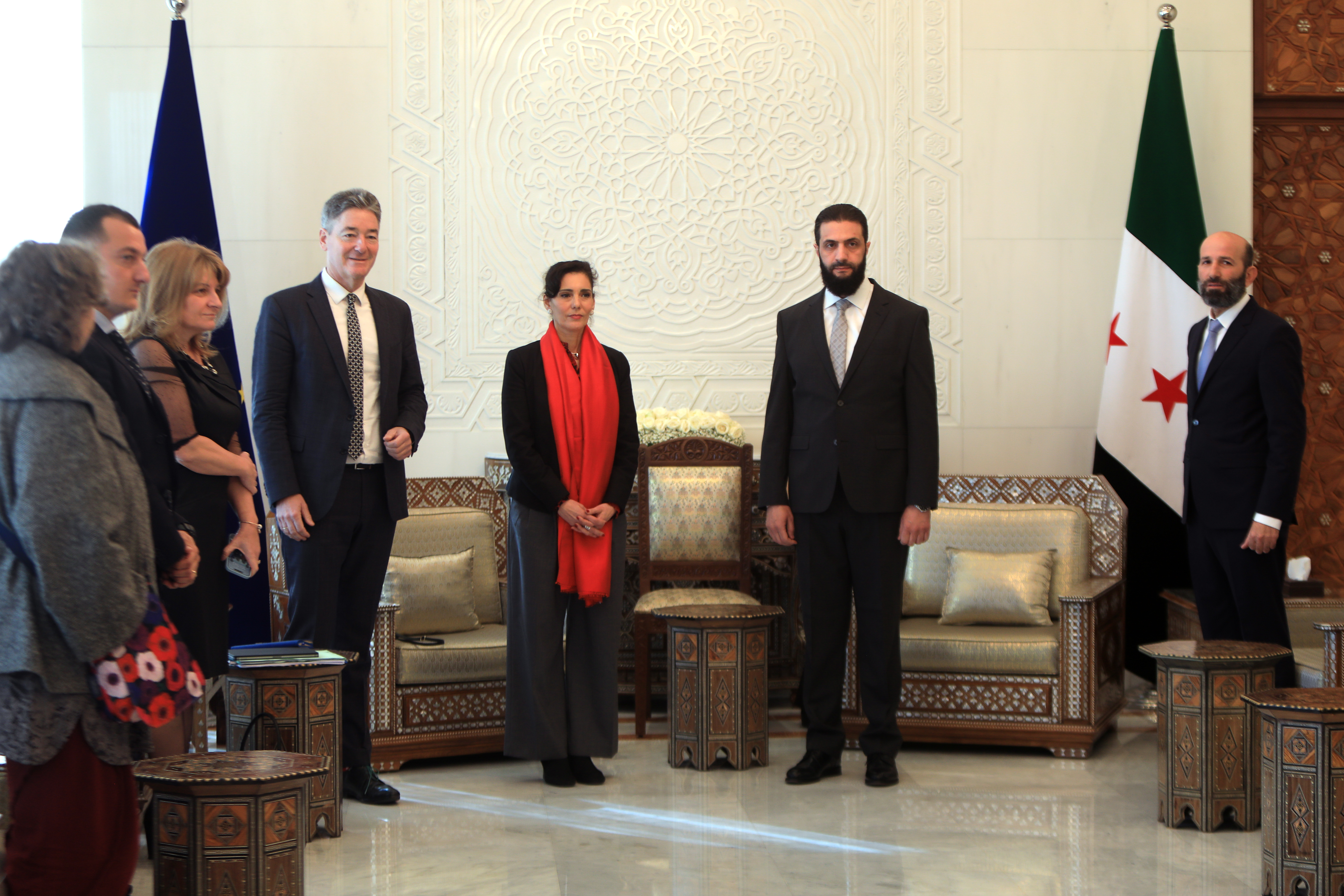
Ahmed al-Sharaa met with European Commissioner Hadja Lahbib in Syria on 17 January 2025

The French and German foreign ministers visited Syria in early January 2025, where they met with al-Sharaa and expressed a will to "support Syria" but also stated that they would refuse to become "a financier of Islamist structures". They also stated that they wanted to see the Syrian Kurds, whose forces acted as French allies during the war, to be included in the political process, as well as cautioned the interim government against "acts of vengeance against groups within the population", unnecessarily delaying elections or attempts to enforce religious law within the judicial or education system. During the visit, al-Sharaa shook hands with the French Jean-Noël Barrot, but avoided shaking the female German foreign minister, Annalena Baerbock's hand, instead offering a small gesture on his chest. This caused a small scandal, as the two ministers stood side by side as he did so. This was criticized by the former head German Institute for International and Security Affairs, Volker Perthes, according to whom the refusal of handshakes with women is uncommon in Syria's tradition and is typically only seen by very conservative Islamist figures, such as those in Iran and Saudi Arabia.

On 2 February 2025, Ahmed al-Sharaa and foreign minister Asaad al-Shaibani visited Saudi Arabia and met with Saudi Prince Mohammed bin Salman. This was Ahmed al-Sharaa's first foreign visit since the fall of the Assad regime. Later, on 4 February 2025, Ahmed al-Sharaa visited the Republic of Turkey as his second foreign visit and met with President Erdogan. On 12 February 2025, Syrian president al-Sharaa held a phone call with Russian president Vladimir Putin, in what was the latter's first contact with a Syrian head of state since Assad's overthrow.

During its invasion of Syria in December 2024, Israel took control of the United Nations Disengagement Observer Force (UNDOF) buffer area, a move that violated the 1974 Disengagement Agreement with Syria. On 23 February 2025, Israeli prime minister Benjamin Netanyahu demanded the complete demilitarization of southern Syria in the provinces of Quneitra, Daraa and Suweyda, and the withdrawal of Syrian forces from Syrian territory south of Damascus. On 25 February 2025, Syria condemned Israel's occupation and demanded Israel's withdrawal. Hours later, Israel conducted a wave of airstrikes in Damascus and southern Syria.

=== Defense ===
Prime Minister Mohammed al-Bashir has said the defense ministry would be restructured using former rebel factions and officers who defected from Assad's army. Murhaf Abu Qasra (nom de guerre; Abu Hassan al-Hamawi), the military commander of Hay'at Tahrir al-Sham, said to The Economist, "All military units will naturally transition to the ministry of defense, forming a unified army tasked with protecting the nation on behalf of all Syrians." The Economist added that "he insists that there will be no place in the new Syria for jihadists eager to launch attacks". Abu Qasra, speaking with AFP, said that HTS would be "among the first to take the initiative" to dissolve its armed wing for a national army; on 21 December it was reported that Abu Qasra was appointed transitional Minister of Defense. Three days later the transitional government announced that a meeting between opposition groups and Ahmed al-Sharaa "ended in an agreement on the dissolution of all the groups and their integration under the supervision of the ministry of defense". The exact composition of groups to be dissolved is unclear, as groups such as the Syrian Democratic Forces (SDF) were not part of the agreement. Previously, the interim authority under HTS was reported by the Institute for the Study of War in mid-December to have joined Turkey in attempting to coerce the SDF to disarm and abandon their autonomy.

On 29 December 2024, al-Sharaa announced the promotion of 42 individuals to the rank of Colonel, 5 to the rank of Brigadier general, and 2 to the rank of Major general in the Syrian Army to the Minister of Defence Murhaf Abu Qasra and Chief of the General Staff of the Syrian Armed Forces and Army Ali Noureddine al-Naasan, who were both elevated to the rank of Major general. Several foreign fighters were appointed to senior military roles. According to Reuters, the fighters were generally of Islamist Jihadist leanings, including a member of the Turkistan Islamic Party, a group listed by the UN as a terrorist organization. Reuters quoted an HTS source, according to which the promotions were a "small token of recognition for the sacrifices Islamic jihadists gave to our struggle for freedom".

In an interview with A Haber, Ahmed al-Sharaa stated that the Kurdish forces are the only side that did not respond to the new administration's call to disarm and restrict arms to the authority, saying that the Kurdistan Workers Party (PKK) and the Syrian Democratic Forces (SDF) had not accepted the call to disarm yet, even though they were invited to join the new ministry of defense. Ahmed al-Sharaa also added that the new administration would not let the PKK conduct terrorist attacks against Turkey and that it would do its best to ensure the safety of the borders with Turkey. Al-Sharaa also added that the People's Defense Units (YPG) did not respond to the calls to disarm. He accused the PKK of exploiting the issue of the Islamic State prisons for its gain.

=== Media ===
The Minister for Information Mohammed al-Omar was quoted on the first day of 2025 by Agence France-Presse saying: "We are working to consolidate freedoms of the press and expression that were severely restricted".

=== Justice ===
Immediately following the fall of Damascus, HTS leader Ahmed al-Sharaa vowed to "hunt down and punish" senior officials of the previous regime, who he deems to be implicated in "torturing the Syrian people". Rewards have been promised for anyone who can provide information about "officials who took part in war crimes". After being declared the president of Syria, al-Sharaa declared that he would "pursue the criminals who shed Syrian blood and committed massacres and crimes".

In mid-January 2025, a resurfaced video of the Minister for Justice Shadi al-Waisi triggered a public scandal in Syria. The video, shot in 2015, appears to show al-Waisi, then a member of the Al-Nusra Front, organizing and taking part in a public execution in Idlib of two women accused of "corruption and prostitution" under Sharia law. An Interim Government official confirmed the identity of al-Waisi in the footage, stating that "the content of the video is an enforcement of the law during a specific time and place, where the procedures were conducted following the valid laws at the time and within a procedural agreement", adding that it "reflects a phase that has been surpassed". Several Syrian groups have called for al-Waisi to resign and be replaced as minister as a result of the video.

There have been hundreds of reports across Syria of civilians belonging to the Alawite sect and other religious minorities being persecuted by HTS forces following the collapse of the Assad regime. On 8 March 2025, the UK-based SOHR reported that Syrian security forces and pro-government fighters had committed a massacre of more than 750 Alawite civilians during clashes in western Syria.

=== Education ===
On 1 January 2025, the Minister for Education announced changes to the national curriculum, including the removal of all references to the Assad era from all subjects, and introducing censorship of other subjects under religious lines. Under the new curriculum, evolution and the big bang theory would also be removed from science classes.

Mentions of the pre-Islamic inhabitants of Syria, such as the Arameans and Canaanites, as well as the history of the ancient gods they worshipped (via the Canaanite religion and the ancient Mesopotamian religion) have also been removed. Texts relating to the role of Syrian women in the country's history and gender equality have been deleted, while the role of the historic Palmyrene Queen Zenobia has been downplayed, having been declared a "fictional character".

The new curriculum includes changes to the way that Islam is presented, as according to the new education minister, Nazir al-Qadri, the previous revision presented Quranic verses in a 'wrong' way. Among other changes, the phrase "Defending the nation" is to be replaced with "Defending Allah". "Path to Goodness" has been changed to "Islamic Path", while "those who have are damned and have gone astray" has been changed to "Jews and Christians", a change described by CNN as part of an ultra-conservative interpretation of a Quranic verse.

The changes were denied by education minister al-Qadri, who had announced that the only instructions that were given were for changes that included the removal of content "glorifying the defunct Assad regime" and changing the Ba'athist-era flag with the 'revolutionary' flag. The changes were met with mixed reactions, as they indicated a shift to a more conservative Islamist-style education system.

== Dissolution ==
The government implemented the Constitutional Declaration of the Syrian Arab Republic, a provisional constitution ratified by Syrian president Ahmed al-Sharaa on 13 March 2025, establishing the basic law of Syria for a five-year transition period from 2025 to 2030. The Interim Constitution sets a presidential system with the executive power at the hands of the president who appoints the ministers, without the position of prime minister. On 29 March, the Syrian transitional government was announced by al-Sharaa at a ceremony at the Presidential Palace in Damascus, in which the new ministers were sworn in and delivered speeches outlining their agendas. The government replaced the Syrian caretaker government, which was formed following the fall of the Assad regime.

== Members ==
Mohammad al-Bashir cabinet

Caretaker prime minister Mohammad al-Bashir told Al Jazeera on 16 December 2024 that "for the time being" ministers from the Syrian Salvation Government (SSG) would head national ministries.

Portfolio	Minister	Took office	Left office	Party	Ref
Prime Minister	Mohammed al-Bashir	10 December 2024	29 March 2025	HTS	
Minister of Administrative Development	Fadi al-Qassem	10 December 2024	29 March 2025	HTS	
Minister of Agriculture and Agrarian Reform	Mohammed Taha al-Ahmed	10 December 2024	29 March 2025	HTS	
Minister of Communications and Information Technology	Hussein al-Masri	12 December 2024	29 March 2025	Independent	
Minister of Defense	Murhaf Abu Qasra	21 December 2024	29 March 2025	HTS	
Minister of Economy and Foreign Trade	Basel Abdul Hannan	10 December 2024	29 March 2025	HTS	
Minister of Education	Nazir al-Qadri	10 December 2024	29 March 2025	HTS	
Minister of Awqaf	Hussam Haj Hussein	10 December 2024	29 March 2025	HTS	
Minister of Electricity	Omar Shaqrouq	10 December 2024	29 March 2025	HTS	
Minister of Finance	Mohammed Abazaid	December 2024	29 March 2025	Independent	
Minister of Foreign Affairs and Expatriates	Asaad al-Shaibani	21 December 2024	29 March 2025	HTS	
Director of the General Intelligence Service	Anas Khattab	26 December 2024	29 March 2025	HTS	
Director of the General Directorate of Customs	Qutaiba Ahmed Badawi	December 2024	29 March 2025	HTS	
Minister of Higher Education and Scientific Research	Abdel Moneim Abdel Hafez	10 December 2024	29 March 2025	HTS	
Minister of Information	Mohammed al-Omar	10 December 2024	29 March 2025	HTS	
Minister of Health	Maher al-Sharaa	16 December 2024	29 March 2025	HTS	
Minister of Interior	Ali Keda	19 January 2025	29 March 2025	HTS	
Minister of Internal Trade and Consumer Protection	Maher Khalil al-Hasan	10 December 2024	29 March 2025	Independent	
Minister of Justice	Shadi al-Waisi	10 December 2024	29 March 2025	HTS	
Minister of Local Administration and Environment	Mohamed Muslim	10 December 2024	29 March 2025	HTS	
Minister of Oil and Mineral Resources	Ghiath Diab	December 2024	29 March 2025	Independent	
Minister of Transport	Bahaa Aldeen Shurm	December 2024	29 March 2025	Independent	
Minister of Water Resources	Osama Abu Zaid	December 2024	29 March 2025	Independent	
Head of Women's Affairs Office	Aisha al-Dibs	22 December 2024	29 March 2025	Independent	

== See also ==
- Politics of Syria
- Syrian civil war
- National Coalition of Syrian Revolutionary and Opposition Forces
- United Nations Security Council Resolution 2254
- Syrian Interim Government
- Syrian Salvation Government
- National Transitional Council, a similar provisional government in Libya that operated from 2011 to 2012
- Fall of the Assad regime
- Foreign relations of Syria
