= Mohammad Abdulrahman Tarkou =

Syrian politician (born 1979)

Minister of Education
- Incumbent
- Assumed office 29 March 2025
- President: Ahmed al-Sharaa
- Preceded by: Nazir al-Qadri

Personal details
- Born: 1979 (age 46–47) Afrin, Syria
- Education: Damascus University (BA); Leipzig University (PhD)

Mohammad Abdulrahman Tarkou (Arabic: محمد عبد الرحمن تركو, Kurdish: Mêhmed Ebdulrêhman Turkou; born 1979) is a Syrian academic and politician who has served as the Minister of Education in the Syrian transitional government since 29 March 2025. He is a Syrian Kurd and hails from the city of Afrin in northern Syria.

== Education and academic career ==
Tarkou earned his bachelor's degree in law from Damascus University in 2001, specializing in criminal law. He later pursued his doctoral studies in Germany and received a PhD in law from Leipzig University. His academic focus includes special penal law, child rights, and child protection from violence.

He has served as a professor at the Faculty of Law at Damascus University, where he taught subjects including child legislation and its institutions. He also taught at the Faculty of Education, focusing on child-related legislation.

== Administrative roles ==
From 2022 to 2024, Tarkou held the position of Vice President of Damascus University for Administrative and Student Affairs. He was also a member of the academic staff at the Syrian Virtual University and contributed to research on topics such as child protection, citizenship values in educational curricula, and human rights education.

== Ministerial role ==
On 29 March 2025, Tarkou was appointed Minister of Education in the Syrian transitional government led by President Ahmed al-Sharaa.

Tarkou's appointment occurred amid growing internal and external calls for a more inclusive and representative government. He is reportedly the only Kurdish figure serving in the Syrian transitional government.

Despite this, the Democratic Autonomous Administration of North and East Syria expressed a critical stance toward the newly formed government, claiming that it fails to reflect the diversity of Syrian society and claimed that, similar to the era of Bashar al-Assad, power remains centralized in the hands of the new president, Ahmed al-Sharaa.
