= Ali Keda =

Assistant Secretary-General to the Presidency for the Cabinet Affairs since 2025

- علي كدة

Assistant Secretary-General to the Presidency for the Cabinet Affairs
- Incumbent
- Assumed office 26 May 2025
- President: Ahmed al-Sharaa
- Secretary-General: Maher al-Sharaa (2025–2026); Abdul Rahman al-Aama
- Preceded by: Qais Khadr

Minister of Interior
- In office 19 January 2025 – 29 March 2025
- President: Ahmed al-Sharaa (Note: As de facto leader until 29 January 2025.)
- Prime Minister: Mohammed al-Bashir
- Preceded by: Mohammad Abdul Rahman
- Succeeded by: Anas Khattab

Prime Minister of the Syrian Salvation Government
- In office 18 November 2019 – 13 January 2024
- Leader: Ahmed al-Sharaa
- Preceded by: Fawaz Hilal
- Succeeded by: Mohammed al-Bashir

Personal details
- Born: 1973 (age 52–53) Harbanoush, Idlib, Syria
- Party: Independent
- Other political affiliations: Hay'at Tahrir al-Sham (until 2025)
- Education: University of Aleppo

Military service
- Allegiance: Ba'athist Syria; Army of Conquest; Sham Legion
- Years of service: March 2011; September 2011–2012
- Rank: Lieutenant colonel

Ali Abdulrahman Keda (Arabic: علي عبد الرحمن كدة; born 1973) is a Syrian politician, engineer, and former rebel who has been serving as the Assistant Secretary-General to the Presidency for the Cabinet Affairs since 2025. He previously served as Minister of Interior in the Syrian caretaker government from 2024 to 2025, and as the fourth Prime Minister of the Syrian Salvation Government from 2019 to 2024.

== Early life ==
Keda was born in Harbanoush, a village in Idlib Governorate, in 1973. He obtained degrees in electrical engineering from the University of Aleppo and military engineering from a state military academy. He then enlisted in the Syrian military, serving as a technician at al-Nayrab military airbase in Aleppo Governorate and being promoted to the rank of lieutenant colonel. In March 2011, at the onset of the Syrian civil war, Keda defected from the military before rejoining six months later. He was arrested and again defected in 2012 after his release.

Keda allegedly served as the deputy head of the Army of Conquest's security department. After its dissolution, he served as a security official with the Sham Legion before resigning. He then worked for the Free Police, but was dismissed after joining the Salvation Government.

== Political career ==
Keda initially worked with local councils. Under the administration of Fawaz Hilal formed in November 2018, Keda served as Deputy Minister of the Interior for Administrative Affairs and Public Relations. Following the resignation of Hilal's cabinet at the completion of its one-year term, Keda was given thirty days to present a new government to the General Shura Council. On 18 November 2019, Keda's government was approved by the General Shura Council and he was elected prime minister, winning 65% of the vote. Shortly after his appointment, he pledged to tackle the surge in the number of internally displaced persons in Idlib.

On 23 March 2020, Keda tasked Abdullah al-Shawi with chairing an emergency committee intended to coordinate the administration's response to the COVID-19 pandemic in Syria. He was criticised for attending meetings without a face mask.

In an interview with Le Temps, Keda appealed to the international community to deliver humanitarian assistance to Idlib in coordination with the Salvation Government. He also called on the European Union to "recognize the reality of the situation in Syria," stating that Bashar al-Assad's government was "terrorist."

On 1 December 2020, Keda was re-elected as prime minister by the General Shura Council, winning 81% of the vote. The vote was criticized by opposition activists who compared his appointment with that of Syrian prime minister Hussein Arnous.

=== Fall of the Assad regime and the Syrian transitional government ===
Following the fall of the Assad regime in December 2024, Ali Keda appeared together with Ahmed al-Sharaa in both meetings with both domestic and international delegations to the Syrian caretaker government.

On 19 January 2025, Keda was appointed as Minister of Interior in the Syrian caretaker government until the caretaker government was replaced by the Syrian Transitional Government on 29 March 2025. On 26 May 2025, Keda was appointed as Assistant Secretary-General to the Presidency for the Cabinet Affairs, serving under Secretary-General to the Presidency to Maher al-Sharaa and Abdul Rahman al-Aama.
