= Syrian Salvation Government =

Quasi-state of a faction within the Syrian opposition (2017–2024)

Syrian Salvation Government حكومة الإنقاذ السورية Ḥukūmat al-ʾInqādh as-Sūriyyah
- 2017–2024
- Flag (2018–2024) Emblem

- Territories controlled by the SSG from March 2020 to November 2024
- Status: Unrecognized quasi-state (de facto)
- Capital: Idlib
- Official languages: Arabic
- Religion: Islam
- Government: Unitary provisional government under an Islamic technocracy
- De facto leader (Note: As the emir of Hay'at Tahrir al-Sham (HTS) and as Leader of the Liberated Areas, al-Sharaa was widely regarded as the de facto leader of the Syrian Salvation Government after HTS had established control over most of Idlib Governorate, which it governed through its civilian administration.)
  - 2017–2024: Ahmed al-Sharaa
- Prime Minister
  - 2017–2018 (first): Mohammed al-Sheikh
  - 2024 (last): Mohammed al-Bashir
- President of the General Shura Council
  - 2017–2020 (first): Bassam al-Sahyouni
  - 2020–2024 (last): Mustafa al-Mousa
- Legislature: General Shura Council
- Historical era: Syrian civil war
  - Formation of the Tahrir al-Sham: 28 January 2017
  - Formation of the Syrian Salvation Government: 2 November 2017
  - Syrian opposition offensives: 27 November – 8 December 2024
  - The Syrian Salvation Government (Seventh Cabinet) is reorganized into the Syrian Arab Republic (Syrian caretaker government): 10 December 2024
  - HTS disbanded: 29 January 2025

Population
  - 2023 estimate: 4,000,000
- Currency: Turkish lira, United States dollar
- Time zone: UTC+3 (AST)
- Website syriansg.org (dead link)
Preceded by	Succeeded by
Tahrir al-Sham; Syrian Interim Government	Syrian Arab Republic

The Syrian Salvation Government (SSG) (Note: Arabic: حكومة الإنقاذ السورية, romanized: Ḥukūmat al-ʾInqādh as-Sūriyya) was an unrecognized quasi-state in Syria, formed on 2 November 2017 by Hay'at Tahrir al-Sham (HTS) and other opposition groups during the Syrian civil war, as an administration responsible for managing the affairs of civilians in areas under its control. It controlled parts of northwestern Syria, primarily in the Idlib Governorate and Aleppo Governorate, as well as smaller areas of the Hama Governorate and Latakia Governorate.

The SSG had an estimated population of over 4,000,000 in 2023 and Its de facto capital was Idlib.The SSG was governed as an authoritarian technocratic Islamic state with two branches: the legislative General Shura Council, headed by a president, and the executive branch, headed by a prime minister. Although HTS declared its independence from the SSG, the SSG was widely regarded as its civilian administration that maintained a degree of operational autonomy from the group. It has been described as the state-building project of then-HTS leader Ahmed al-Sharaa.

After the December 2024 fall of Damascus, the final prime minister of Ba'athist Syria, Mohammad Ghazi al-Jalali, transferred power to SSG Prime Minister Mohammed al-Bashir. Ministers from the Syrian Salvation Government subsequently assumed the same posts in the new caretaker government of Syria.

== Background ==
Prior to the formation of the SSG in 2017, Idlib Governorate was governed by a patchwork of armed opposition groups, co-operatively-run local councils and independent organizations nominally under the authority of the opposition Syrian Interim Government (SIG). As Syrian government offensives encroached on the territory, civil initiatives to create a unified governing body were increasingly undertaken but failed due to a lack of trust and differences of opinion between stakeholders.

HTS and its predecessor organizations, the al-Qaeda franchise al-Nusra Front and Jabhat Fatah al-Sham, have long maintained a presence in Idlib. The al-Nusra Front was not particularly interested in the minutiae of governance, leaving local councils to govern themselves. However, in 2013, Ahmed al-Sharaa (Abu Mohammed al-Julani) — then the emir of al-Nusra — expressed his belief that the popular support required to establish an Islamic emirate could only be obtained through provision of public goods and services, laying the theoretical groundwork for increased involvement in governance.

HTS initially shared its governing responsibilities with other armed groups, but this became increasingly unilateral as al-Sharaa sought to impose his group's hegemony over the province. HTS engaged in fighting against rival armed groups in the region, such as Ahrar al-Sham, the Syrian National Army and the local affiliate of the Islamic State, Liwa al-Aqsa. During major offensives in January–March 2017 and July 2017, HTS expelled or subjugated these groups, leaving it as the pre-eminent military power in the province.

== History ==
The General Syrian Conference, held in Idlib in September 2017, was a continuation of the Civil Administration Initiative in opposition-controlled areas, held at the end of August 2017 in Idlib. At its conclusion on 11 September 2017, the Conference formed a constituent body named the General Shura Council, headed by president Bassam al-Sahyouni, and appointed a prime minister. The Syrian Interim Government and the Syrian Democratic Forces in Qamishli and Afrin rejected the results of the conference. Conference participants agreed upon "Islamic law as the only source of legislation", "the need to preserve the identity of the Syrian Muslim people", "the overthrow of the illegal regime with all its symbols and pillars and holding it accountable for its committed crimes, as well as liberating the Syrian territory from all the occupying forces, extending security and spreading justice in the liberated areas".

The move was seen as part of an attempt by HTS to impose its control on the region. Riad al-Asaad's attendance at the conference was controversial. Riad al-Asaad said that "HTS has previously declared that it will be dissolve itself, which is an external and internal demand", and that HTS "did not attend the conference and we did not communicate with them after it ended, either". However, the Hawar Kilis Operations Room, part of the Syrian National Army, condemned Riad al-Asaad and accused him of conspiring with al-Qaeda.

In early November 2017, the General Conference formed the SSG. There followed weeks of conflict between the new government and the Syrian Interim Government (SIG), with reports of HTS unilaterally disbanding several SIG-supported local councils across northwestern Syria. Mohammed al-Sheikh was initially appointed as prime minister, with Riad al-Asaad serving as deputy prime minister for military affairs alongside eleven other ministers. Al-Sheikh announced the formation of four commissions: Inspection Authority, Prisoners and Missing Persons Affairs, Planning and Statistics Authority, and the Commission of Trade Unions. On 12 December 2017, the SSG issued a warning that called for the SIG to evacuate their offices from opposition-controlled areas in 72 hours. There were reports that some SIG-run local councils had already been closed and replaced by SSG-loyal alternatives, but others said they would not vacate their offices.

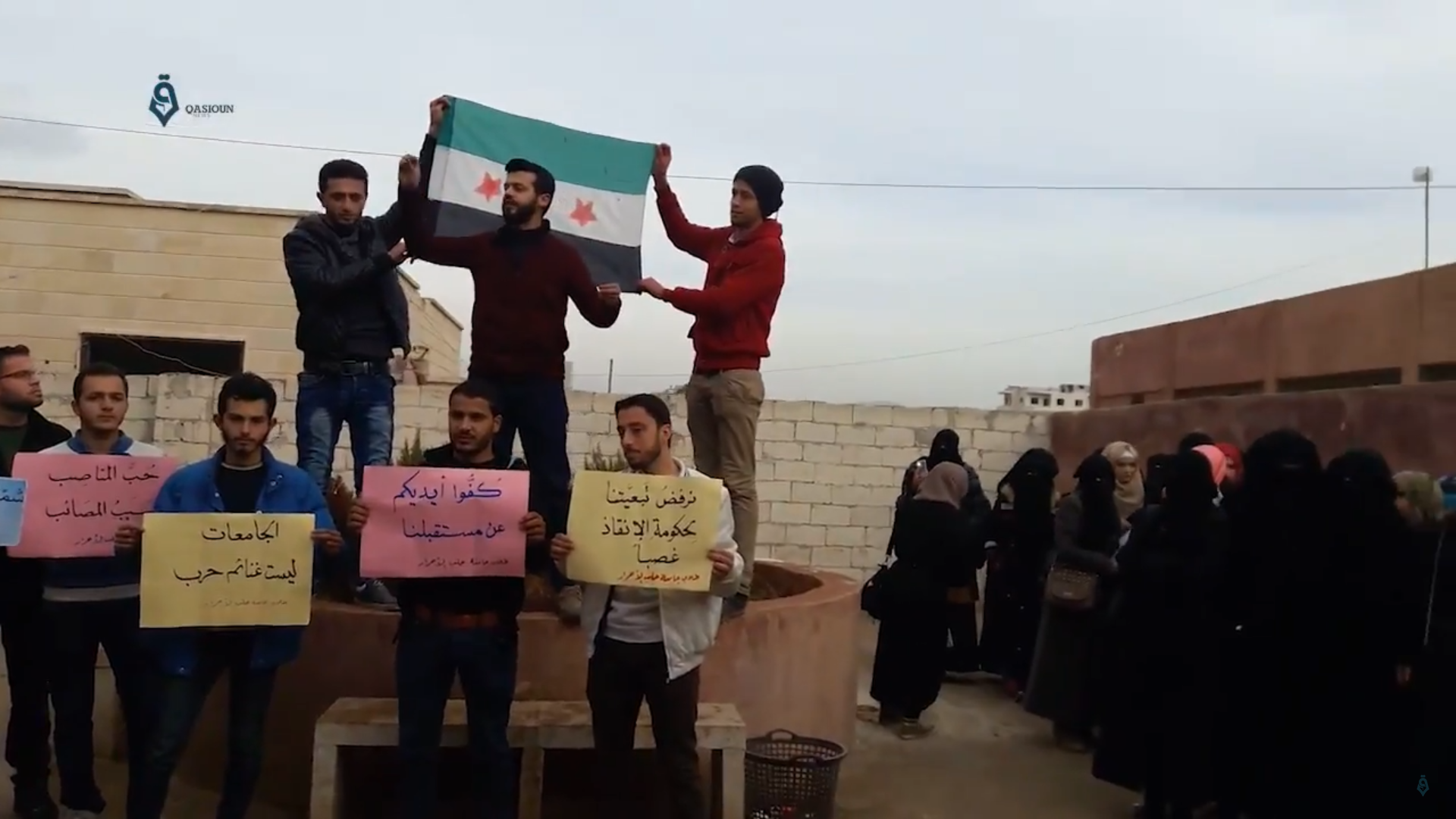
Students of the Free Aleppo University in al-Dana protest against the closure of several faculties by the Syrian Salvation Government

On 6 January 2018, the SSG seized control of the SIG-run Free Aleppo University and closed several faculties in al-Dana and Sarmada, north of Idlib, where almost 4,000 students studied. This resulted in protests by students and lecturers of the university against the group. On 15 August 2018, the SSG's Founding Body accepted the resignation of Mohammed al-Sheikh after the kidnapping of a prominent health director. Although the director was ransomed for US$100,000, al-Sheikh had promised to resign if the Ministry of Interior failed to apprehend the captors within 24 hours. On 18 August, the Founding Body instructed Fawaz Hilal to form a new government with the deputy prime minister, Mohammed Jamal Shahoud, leading in the interim.

The SSG's Constitution Drafting Assembly appointed Fawaz Hilal as prime minister, alongside nine cabinet ministers, on 10 December 2018. Hilal and much of his cabinet maintained close ties with HTS. During his term, the Ministry of Economy was merged with the Ministry of Agriculture and the Ministry of Housing and Reconstruction was merged with the Ministry of Local Administration and Services. During a government offensive on Idlib in May 2019, Hilal called upon Turkey to support the opposition.

Tax increases, rising commodity prices and accusations that the SSG was establishing monopolies on key goods such as fuel led to protests between October and November 2019, with demonstrators chanting slogans against the SSG and Ahmed al-Sharaa. After residents of Kafr Takharim refused to pay a new tax on olive oil and expelled SSG officials, HTS besieged and bombed the town, killing 5. Hilal and his cabinet resigned shortly afterwards, leading to the Shura Council asking Ali Keda, Deputy Minister of the Interior for Administrative Affairs and Public Relations, to form a new government. On 18 November 2019, Keda was elected prime minister by the council, winning 65% of the vote. However, some activists said the reshuffle was merely "changing faces".

On 23 March 2020, the SSG created an emergency committee to coordinate its response to the COVID-19 pandemic in Syria. Measures taken by the SSG to prevent the spread of COVID-19 included suspending Friday prayers, shutting down schools and markets and opening quarantine centres in Jisr al-Shughur, Sarmada and Kafr Karmin. However, these efforts were undermined by hardliners from HTS and al-Qaeda's Syrian branch, Hurras al-Din, that continued to pray and hold sermons in mosques without social distancing. The SSG possessed limited resources to deal with a large outbreak of COVID-19, with only 107 ventilators and 243 intensive care unit beds at its disposal.

On 7 April 2020, Bassam al-Sahyouni, president of the General Shura Council, resigned. Sources told Enab Baladi that his resignation was in response to attempts by HTS to interfere in the council's activities. On 24 April 2020, the Council elected Mustafa al-Mousa, a pharmacist who previously headed its health committee, as his successor.

On 1 December 2020, Ali Keda was re-elected as prime minister for another term by the General Shura Council, receiving 81% of the vote. The appointment was criticized by opposition activists, who likened it to elections in territories controlled by the Ba'athist regime.

In his speech during the Eid al-Adha celebrations in July 2022, Ahmed al-Sharaa described the SSG as "an important stage in the history of the Syrian revolution. It is a transition from the chaotic situation in which the liberated areas were toward organization."

In May 2023, the DAANES and SSG announced separate proposals to host millions of Syrian refugees stranded across the neighboring countries following the Arab League's readmission of the Assad government. After formal diplomatic talks in July 2023, the SSG concluded an agreement with AANES to begin trading fuel supplies between the DAANES and Idlib. The meetings had been conducted amid growing tensions between Turkey and SDF, and SDF's intention to deploy HTS as a check on the growing Turkish influence in northern Syria. For their part, the SSG proposed joint counter-terrorism efforts alongside SDF. The talks also involved negotiations on political arrangements, such as the prospects for a joint SSG-DAANES civil administration in the event of potential expulsion of SNA forces from northern Syria.

On January 13, 2024, the Shura Council elected Minister of Development and Humanitarian Affairs Mohammed al-Bashir as prime minister, succeeding Ali Keda. His election platform focused on e-government and government automation.

In March 2024, the Ministry of Interior said it would form a three-judge panel 'security court' for the families of detainees following demonstrations in Idlib due to the death of military personnel in prison and dissatisfaction at HTS influence. The Ministry of Interior also announced an amnesty for detainees "under certain conditions and exceptions" and established a 'General Security Administration' under its purview.

In November 2024, HTS-led rebel groups launched the Syrian opposition offensives, capturing Aleppo city and bringing it under the control of the SSG. The SSG reactivated its inter-ministerial emergency response committee to coordinate its expansion into the new territories. The committee prepared tents for new IDPs displaced by bombing, coordinated the transfer of 100,000 loaves of bread from Idlib's bakeries to Aleppo city, and dispatched rubble removal and street cleaning teams. By December 3, the SSG had opened several government institutions in Aleppo city, began garbage collection, and restarted water and electricity services, it had also resumed traffic control duties and according to Reuters, "internet coverage has improved as a rebel-linked telecoms network (Syria Phone) has expanded its reach". HTS Emir al-Julani said that governance duties would be transferred to a "transitional body" in the city rather than the Salvation Government and would withdraw fighters. Dareen Khalifa of the International Crisis Group in contract with Ahmed al-Sharaa said this was to avoid restrictions on international aid coming into the city due to HTS's terrorist designation.

During the offensive, drones dropped SSG leaflets on government positions which exhorted troops to desert or defect and contained contact details for the SSG's "Center for Safety and Defection". The SSG offered amnesty to all surrendering government forces who remained in Aleppo after its capture.

Following the overthrow of the Assad regime and the establishment of a new, nationwide caretaker government, most incumbent ministers in the SSG retained their posts in the new government.

== Government and politics ==
The SSG was described as centralised, technocratic, and non-ideological in nature. Many of its positions were occupied by members of the educated urban elite attempting to regain influence after the end of direct governance by armed opposition groups, particularly businessmen and conservative revolutionary activists.

=== Legislature ===
President of the General Shura Council of the Syrian Salvation Government
- Type: Head of the legislative
- Member of: General Shura Council
- Seat: Idlib, Idlib Governorate
- Formation: 2 November 2017
- First holder: Bassam al-Sahyouni
- Final holder: Mustafa al-Mousa
- Abolished: 10 December 2024
- Unofficial names: Head of the General Shura Council of the Syrian Salvation Government
- Deputy: Deputy head of the General Shura Council; Abdul Karim Barakat (last)

The General Shura Council was the legislative body of the SSG. It was responsible for electing a prime minister and approving ministerial appointments, drafting laws and presenting them for implementation to the executive branch, and ratifying the executive's plans. The council was also in charge of forming specialized committees that oversaw and scrutinized the work of the executive.

The council was composed of representatives of the various "segments" of society, each having 15 elected members. These segments included trade unions, tribes, internally displaced people and local residents. Candidates for Council elections were pre-selected and women were not permitted to vote. In April 2024, the council announced the selection of an eight-member Higher Election Committee (Note: Consists of Essam Al-Khalif (Chairman), Ali Sultan (Deputy), Mohamed Ragheb, Mohamed Mahmoud Al-Zein, Abdul Ghani Sahari, Abdul Nasser Al-Youssef, and Abdul Qader Ghazal.) to determine a new electoral process and delineate electoral districts for future elections. The committee was reportedly considering giving representation to women, local councils, minorities, and the military.

Women held few positions in the SSG's government and were confined to the Women's Office. As of July 2024, female leadership was absent from 10 of the SSG's 11 ministries, and no woman had ever been granted a ministerial portfolio.

=== Executive ===
Prime Minister of the Syrian Salvation Government
- Type: Head of executive (Head of government)
- Seat: Idlib, Idlib Governorate
- Appointer: General Shura Council
- Term length: One year; renewable twice
- Formation: 2 November 2017
- First holder: Mohammed al-Sheikh
- Final holder: Mohammed al-Bashir
- Abolished: 10 December 2024
- Succession: Prime Minister of Syria

The prime minister was elected by the Shura Council. Candidates for prime minister were nominated by council members. A minimum of 10 members had to support a nomination for it to advance to the voting stage. In the event only one candidate advanced to the voting stage, they had to obtain two-thirds of Council's vote to be elected; otherwise, the candidate with the most votes won. Once elected, the prime minister was required to present his cabinet to the council for approval within 30 days. Prime ministers were elected for one year terms: the first term was a "trial year", after which the Council could elect them for second and third terms.

Prospective prime ministerial candidates had to be Syrian, hold a university degree, be married to a Syrian, not have been convicted of a crime, have a "good reputation" and possess a "revolutionary history".

==== Election of the Prime Minister ====
On 11 December 2018, the SSG's Constitution Drafting Assembly convened at Bab al-Hawa to elect Hilal as its new prime minister after the resignation of his predecessor, Mohammed al-Sheikh. On 18 November 2019, Ali Keda was elected as prime minister by the General Shura Council, winning 65% of the vote. On 1 December 2020, Keda was re-elected by the General Shura Council, winning 81% of the vote. The vote was criticized by opposition activists who compared his appointment with that of Syrian prime minister Hussein Arnous.

==== List of prime ministers ====
No.	Name	Took office	Left office
1	Mohammed al-Sheikh	2 November 2017	18 August 2018
2	Mohammed Jamal Shahoud (acting)	18 August 2018	10 December 2018
3	Fawaz Hilal	10 December 2018	18 November 2019
4	Ali Keda	18 November 2019	13 January 2024
5	Mohammed al-Bashir	13 January 2024	10 December 2024

==== Ministries ====
The SSG consisted of eleven ministries, under each of which numerous departments and directorates operated. The SSG originally comprised ten ministries, with the eleventh, the Ministry of Information, being formed in 2023. Five institutions operated independently of a ministry and reported directly to the prime minister.

Ministerial nominees were evaluated based on several criteria, including age and academic qualifications. The nomination process involved discussions with the Shura Council's committees, elites and relevant community and professional bodies.

===== Sixth cabinet (2023–2024) =====
Incumbent	Office	Term start	Term end	References
Ali Keda	Prime Minister			
Mohammed al-Bashir	Ministry of Development			
Mohammad Abdul Rahman	Ministry of Interior			
Shadi al-Waisi	Ministry of Justice			
Hussam Haj Hussein	Ministry of Awqaf			
Saeed Adel Mando	Ministry of Higher Education			
Nazir al-Qadri	Ministry of Education			
Hussein Abdel Malik Bazar	Ministry of Health			
Basil Abdul Aziz	Ministry of Economy			
Mohammed al-Omar	Ministry of Information			
Mohammed Taha al-Ahmed	Ministry of Agriculture and Irrigation			
Mohamed Muslim	Ministry of Local Administration			

===== Seventh and last cabinet (2024) =====
Incumbent	Office	Term start	Term end	References
Mohammed al-Bashir	Prime Minister	13 January 2024	10 December 2024	
Fadi al-Qassem	Ministry of Development	28 February 2024	10 December 2024	
Mohammad Abdul Rahman	Ministry of Interior	28 February 2024	10 December 2024	
Shadi al-Waisi	Ministry of Justice	28 February 2024	10 December 2024	
Hussam Haj Hussein	Ministry of Awqaf	28 February 2024	10 December 2024	
Abdel Moneim Abdel Hafez	Ministry of Higher Education	28 February 2024	10 December 2024	
Nazir al-Qadri	Ministry of Education	28 February 2024	10 December 2024	
Mazen Dukhan	Ministry of Health	28 February 2024	10 December 2024	
Basil Abdul Aziz	Ministry of Economy	28 February 2024	10 December 2024	
Mohammed al-Omar	Ministry of Information	28 February 2024	10 December 2024	
Mohammed Taha al-Ahmed	Ministry of Agriculture and Irrigation	28 February 2024	10 December 2024	
Mohamed Muslim	Ministry of Local Administration	28 February 2024	10 December 2024	

=== Administrative divisions ===
The SSG's local municipal councils were organized as the Administration of the Liberated Areas (ALA). The ALA was administratively divided into eight regions: Central, Northern, Sarmada, Harem, Jisr ash-Shughur, Ariha, Atme, and Idlib.

=== Foreign relations ===
While no country recognized the SSG as a sovereign state or a legitimate government of Syria, its Department of Political Affairs (DPA) conducted diplomatic outreach. On 29 November 2024, the DPA issued a statement that called on Russia to end its support for the Syrian government and stated that the DPA sought to "build positive relations based on mutual respect and common interests with all countries of the world, including Russia". It issued a similar statement directed to Iraq amid rumours that Iraqi militias were planning to enter Syria to fight alongside government forces.

== Economy ==
The territories controlled by the SSG in Idlib Governorate were primarily rural. The poor level of infrastructure in the region was further degraded by the civil war, which destroyed oil production facilities, power plants, and agricultural silos.

In a 2022 speech, Ahmed al-Sharaa stated his desire to see the SSG's "rate of exports [become] greater than [its] rate of imports" and to encourage industrial development by simplifying planning laws. Through its Local Product Protection Department, the SSG's Ministry of Industry has adopted a protectionist policy of imposing tariffs on imports that compete with domestically produced goods. However, tariffs on imported raw materials and high energy costs mean that domestic production is unable to compete with imports in practice. Weak domestic demand has also limited industrial development, although some pharmaceutical factories have been established.

Rapid depreciation of the Syrian pound triggered by the US Government's Caesar Syria Civilian Protection Act prompted the SSG to replace it with the Turkish lira in its administered territories in June 2020.

Rapid depreciation of the Syrian pound triggered by the US Government's Caesar Syria Civilian Protection Act prompted the SSG to replace it with the Turkish lira in its administered territories in June 2020. Usage of the Syrian pound was criminalized. The Turkish lira crisis raised the cost of imports, leading to increased unemployment, inflation and commodity prices, and severely affecting economic activity. The SSG operates a "General Monetary Agency for Cash Management and Consumer Protection" which regulates foreign exchange rates, hawala services and currency exchange firms. It also operates Sham Bank, a financial institution that is the primary supplier of the lira in its territories.

Sanctions prevent the population of the SSG from accessing international banking services. Access to finance is generally limited to international grants, investments made by opposition groups, and remittances from the Syrian diaspora. To circumvent these restrictions, both opposition groups and civilians have turned to exchanging cryptocurrencies such as Bitcoin and Tether. Cryptocurrency stores operate in Idlib and Sarmada. HTS has encouraged their usage, declaring cryptocurrencies as shariah-compliant and describing Bitcoin as the "Currency of the Future Economy".

The SSG's General Authority of Zakat managed the collection of zakat, the Islamic alms-tax, from Muslims living under its administration. Failing to pay the zakat was illegal and can lead to arrest and imprisonment.

=== Agriculture ===
Agriculture in the SSG's territories was not mechanized. Olive harvesting is the main source of employment for day laborers in Idlib Governorate, and in 2020 agriculture was the primary income source for 36% of households. Both drought and groundwater depletion, exacerbated by illegal drilling and an influx of internally displaced persons into the region, had led to increasing production costs.

The SSG's Ministry of Agriculture managed agricultural affairs and encouraged the cultivation of strategic crops, such as wheat and potatoes. It maintained seed testing laboratories and produced seeds that are distributed to farmers. In 2023, the ministry produced and distributed 4,600 kilograms of cottonseed to farmers in an attempt to restart cotton cultivation in the region, which fell into decline after the reduction of government subsidies in 2007, and increased female employment.

The Ministry of Economy imposed price controls on wheat. In search of higher profits, farmers increasingly planted crops not traditionally cultivated in the region, including saffron, strawberries, bananas, broccoli and Damask roses. These enterprises remained small and experimental though.

=== Energy ===
Most electricity in the SSG's territories was supplied from Turkey by the Green Energy Company, the local franchise of a Turkish firm of the same name. Electricity distribution was managed by the SSG's General Electricity Corporation. In May 2021, the Green Energy Company completed the construction of electrical substations capable of receiving 66kV from Turkey. Transmission lines connect the substations in Reyhanlı in Turkey and Harem in Idlib. By May 2023, over 70% of areas under the SSG's administration were connected to the electrical grid. Areas not connected to the grid relied on diesel generators and solar panels. The Green Energy Company maintained an effective monopoly on the supply of electricity and was accused by the Syrian Observatory for Human Rights of unduly raising prices.

=== Communication ===
In July 2023, the SSG launched "Syria Phone", the first communication and internet services company in Idlib. The state-owned company announced that it would provide "cellular calls, SMS, 4G and video calls."

== Military and law enforcement ==
While the SSG did not have a defense ministry as HTS effectively functioned as it. Despite this, the SSG opened a military college in December 2021, whose purpose was described by Ahmed al-Sharaa as to "[increase] the experience of the mujahidin in military science and martial arts." Over 400 officers graduated from its first course in 2022.

The SSG operated a police force under the Ministry of Interior, the General Security Service. A police academy was opened in September 2023 and produced its first batch of graduates in August 2024.

In 2024, the interior ministry absorbed two security agencies of HTS after a prisoner abuse scandal led to a protest movement, and Ahmed al-Sharaa admitted that HTS had used torture to extract false confessions from prisoners. HTS's General Security Service was transferred to the interior ministry in April 2024, followed by its Public Security Service in June.

== Religion ==
HTS had faced internal opposition from hardline Salafi jihadis, who view its moderate outlook as "un-Islamic". The SSG had institutionalized religious structures and had reasserted the role of the Shafi'i madhhab of Islamic jurisprudence, the predominant legal school followed in Idlib, in an effort to marginalize Salafi-jihadi hardliners. Idlibi clerics characterized the SSG's policies concerning mosques as being "highly centralized and authoritarian". The Ministry of Awqaf had the power to appoint and dismiss clerics; for example, in 2020, clerics affiliated with al-Qaeda affiliate Hurras al-Din in the village of Arab Sa'id were replaced by loyalists. "Mosque officers" appointed by the Ministry of Awqaf monitored mosque activities. Independent khatibs could be substituted for SSG-loyal preachers during politically sensitive events, such as bouts of rebel infighting. Those who refuse substitution risk dismissal.

Although HTS was Salafi in aqidah, the SSG had refrained from imposing a particular strand of Sunni Islam on the populace and predominately Sufi local ulama. It allowed politically neutral traditional religious institutes which taught the competing Ash'ari school of aqidah to operate, including those ran by the Muslim Brotherhood and Tablighi Jamaat. It had gradually accommodated a larger diversity of religious views among preachers, an evolution driven partly by a lack of manpower.

Public opposition halted early attempts at imposing religious laws such as women being required to travel with a mahram. Schools were segregated by gender, but mixing between genders at restaurants and shopping centers was not prevented. The SSG encouraged women to "dress modestly" and wear the hijab, but did not force them to wear the niqāb. The sharia's hudud punishments, such as stoning and flogging, were not imposed. In 2020, Ahmed al-Sharaa told HTS fighters that "some people limit the issue of implementing the rule of the sharia to just imposing some of the hudud punishments, chopping off hands, stoning whomever, whipping someone who drinks alcohol [...] but this is a very basic part of the very big concept of implementing the rule of the sharia".

In December 2024, the SSG's Department for Political Affairs issued a communique addressed to Syria's Alawites, stating that the Assad government had exploited the sect for its survival and had consequently caused "deep societal wounds". It further stated that the "Syrian revolution is a call for freedom, dignity and justice for all under the roof of Syria", and that while it may be "challenging", "wise individuals" from the Alawite sect could lead it to a "just and inclusive future".

== Education ==
The SSG's Ministry of Education supervised the formal schooling system in Idlib, with more than 550,000 students, 1,800 schools and 12 universities in 2022. These included approximately 950 schools directly operated by the ministry and employed nearly 12,500 staff members, in addition to the private education system authorized by the SSG. The curriculum was a continuation of the pre-2011 Syrian syllabus developed in partnership with UNICEF, with the exception of texts related to the Assad regime or deemed as contradicting the Sharia as per the education ministry guidelines. Educational institutions followed gender segregation norms.

Education had been severely disrupted by airstrikes on educational facilities and a lack of funding. In 2022, Ahmed al-Sharaa stated that 200,000 people in the SSG's territories had dropped out of school, warning this could lead to "illiteracy that leads to ignorance, which is a precursor to crime, unemployment, begging, and many other things."

In September 2024, the White Helmets reported that 170 schools had been bombed since 2019. In October 2023, the United Nations Office for the Coordination of Humanitarian Affairs (OCHA) estimated that at least 1 million of the 2.2 million school-aged children in the region were not in education. In 2024, OCHA stated that a decline in international funding had deprived 700 schools of resources, affecting 110,000 students and 6,500 teachers.

== See also ==
- Ebaa News Agency – News agency that reports favorably toward the Salvation Government
- Politics of Syria
- Watad Petroleum
- National Salvation Government
