= Mohammed al-Bashir =

Syrian politician (born 1984)

- محمد البشير
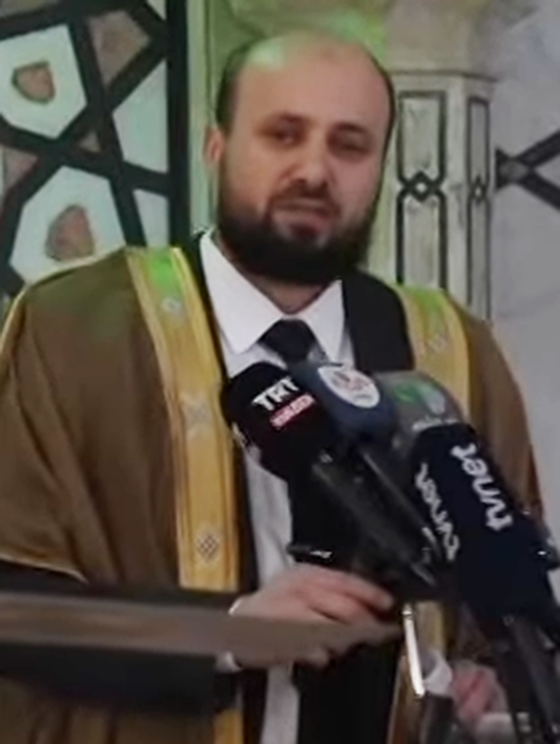
- Al-Bashir in 2024

Minister of Energy of Syria
- Incumbent
- Assumed office 29 March 2025
- President: Ahmed al-Sharaa
- Deputy: Ghiath Diab
- Preceded by: Office established

Prime Minister of Syria
- In office 10 December 2024 – 29 March 2025
- President: Ahmed al-Sharaa (Note: From 29 January 2025 on.) (Note: As de facto leader of Syria from 8 December 2024.)
- Preceded by: Mohammad Ghazi al-Jalali
- Succeeded by: Office abolished

Prime Minister of the Syrian Salvation Government
- In office 13 January 2024 – 10 December 2024
- Preceded by: Ali Keda
- Succeeded by: Position abolished

Personal details
- Born: 1983 (age 42–43) Mashoun, Jabal al-Zawiya, Idlib Governorate, Syria
- Party: Independent (since 2025)
- Other political affiliations: Hay'at Tahrir al-Sham (until 2025)
- Education: University of Aleppo (BE); Idlib University (BA)

Mohammed al-Bashir (Arabic: محمد البشير, romanized: Muḥammad al-Bashīr; born 1983) is a Syrian politician, engineer, and former rebel who has been serving as the Minister of Energy in the Syrian transitional government since March 2025. He led the Syrian caretaker government, which was formed after the fall of the Assad regime, and succeeded Mohammad Ghazi al-Jalali in his role.

Al-Bashir had also served as the fifth and final prime minister of the Syrian Salvation Government, the civilian administration of Hay'at Tahrir al-Sham, from his election on 13 January 2024 until his appointment by the Syrian General Command as the prime minister of Syria.

== Early life and education ==
Al-Bashir was born in 1983 in Mashoun, a village in the Jabal Zawiya region of Idlib Governorate. He graduated with a degree in electrical engineering from the University of Aleppo in 2007. By 2011, al-Bashir had become the head of the Precision Instruments Department at the gas plant of the Syrian Gas Company. After the outbreak of the Syrian civil war, he became director of the Al-Amal Educational Institute, which provided education to children affected by the war. In 2020, he obtained a degree in Sharia and law from Idlib University, alongside certifications in administrative organisation and project management.

== Political career ==
Before being appointed as a minister, al-Bashir served as Director of Islamic Education at the Salvation Government's Ministry of Awqaf for two and a half years. Afterwards, he served as Deputy Director and then Director of Association Affairs at the Ministry of Development and Humanitarian Affairs. Between 2022 and 2023, al-Bashir served as Minister of Development and Humanitarian Affairs in the cabinet of Ali Keda.

=== Prime Minister of the Syrian Salvation Government (2024) ===
On 13 January 2024, the General Shura Council of the Salvation Government voted to elect al-Bashir as prime minister. His election platform focused on e-government and government automation. His administration lowered real estate fees, relaxed planning regulations, and launched consultations for expanding the zoning plan of Idlib. On 5 March 2024, amid demonstrations against HTS in Idlib and the onset of Ramadan, al-Bashir signed a decree granting amnesty to prisoners who were not convicted of serious crimes.

In late November 2024, the HTS-led Military Operations Command, supported by Turkish-backed rebels of the Syrian National Army, launched the Northwestern Syria offensive, leading to the capture of Aleppo and significantly increasing the extent of the Salvation Government's controlled territories. In a press conference, al-Bashir stated that the offensive was launched in response to attacks on civilians by Syrian government troops, which he claimed had led to the displacement of "tens of thousands" of civilians. On 4 December 2024, al-Bashir travelled to Aleppo to supervise the reopening of government offices, praising employees of the previous government who returned to work.

=== Prime Minister of Syria (2024–2025) ===
On 9 December 2024, following the fall of the Assad regime, al-Bashir was tasked with forming the Syrian caretaker government after meeting with HTS leader Ahmed al-Sharaa and outgoing Syrian prime minister Mohammad Ghazi al-Jalali to coordinate a transfer of power. The next day, he was officially appointed by the Syrian General Command as the prime minister of the caretaker government. In a televised statement, al-Bashir announced that officials from the Salvation Government met with representatives of the previous government to facilitate the handover of power and that his cabinet from the Salvation Government would assume their corresponding roles in the caretaker government.

With the 2012 Constitution of Ba'athist Syria suspended following the fall of the Assad regime, the new Constitutional Declaration established a presidential system which vests executive power solely in the president, who is responsible for ministerial appointments and other head-of-government duties previously discharged by the prime minister. As such, the position of prime minister was abolished on 29 March 2025 when the Syrian transitional government replaced the caretaker government.

=== Ministry of Energy (2025–present) ===
On 29 March 2025, the Syrian transitional government was announced by Syrian President al-Sharaa at a ceremony at the Presidential Palace in Damascus, in which the new ministers were sworn in and delivered speeches outlining their agendas. With that announcement, al-Bashir was appointed Minister of Energy in the Syrian transitional government and was tasked with restoring the electricity and oil sectors, which had been severely damaged during the Syrian civil war.

== Notes ==
Political offices
Preceded by Mohammad Ghazi al-Jalali	Prime Minister of Syria; 2024–2025	Office abolished
