= Tourist Police =

Tourist Police may refer to:

- Tourist Police (Bangladesh), branch of the Bangladesh Police responsible for investigating crimes against tourists
- Tourist Police (Kyrgyzstan), unit of the Ministry of Interior providing help to tourists
- Tourist Police (Malaysia), unit of the Royal Malaysian Police providing tourists and visitors information on the local community
- Tourist Police (Thailand), department of the Royal Thai Police that cooperates with foreign nationals and promotes their security
- Tourist Police (Syria), a unit of the Syrian Ministry of Interior tasked with protecting tourists and tourist sites
