= Public Security Police (Syria) =

Public Security Police شرطة الأمن العام Shurṭat al-amn al-ʻāmm
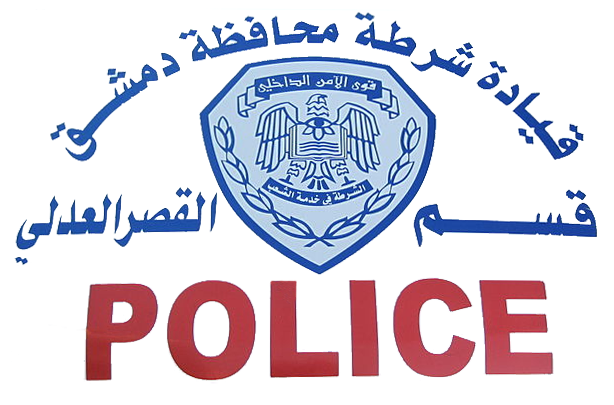
- Police emblem of the Damascus Governorate
- Common name: Syrian Police, Internal Security Forces
- Abbreviation: SPSP/ISF
- Motto: الشرطة في خدمة الشعب; Police is for the service of people

Agency overview
- Formed: 29 May 1945
- Dissolved: 8 December 2024
- Superseding agency: Internal Security Forces
- Employees: 80,000 (2021)
- Annual budget: LS 7,825,000

Jurisdictional structure
- National agency (Operations jurisdiction): Syrian Arab Republic
- Operations jurisdiction: Syrian Arab Republic
- Area: 185,180 km2
- Population: 18,437,288
- Legal jurisdiction: Criminal Code
- Governing body: Criminal Security Directorate
- General nature: Civilian police

Operational structure
- Overseen by: Government of Syria
- Headquarters: Damascus, Syria
- Agency executive: Mohammad Khaled al-Rahmoun, Minister of Interior
- Parent agency: Ministry of Interior
- Directorates: List of Directorates: Criminal Security Directorate; Anti-Narcotics Directorate; Medical Services Directorate; Immigration and Passports Directorate

Facilities
- Patrol cars: Opel Omega B1, Opel Omega B2, Honda Accord, Ford Courier, Beijing BJ212, Toyota Land Cruiser, Toyota Hilux
- Armoured personnel carriers: BTR-60, BTR-152, BRDM-2, Shortland Mk 3, Shortland Mk 4
- Helicopters: at least 2 MI-171SH

Notables
- Anniversary: 29 May, 4 May (Traffic Police)

Website
- https://syriamoi.gov.sy

The Public Security Police (Arabic: شرطة الأمن العام) was the main police service of Ba'athist Syria. It was charged with maintaining law and order, protecting life and property and investigating crimes. It also performed other routine police functions, including traffic control.

== History ==
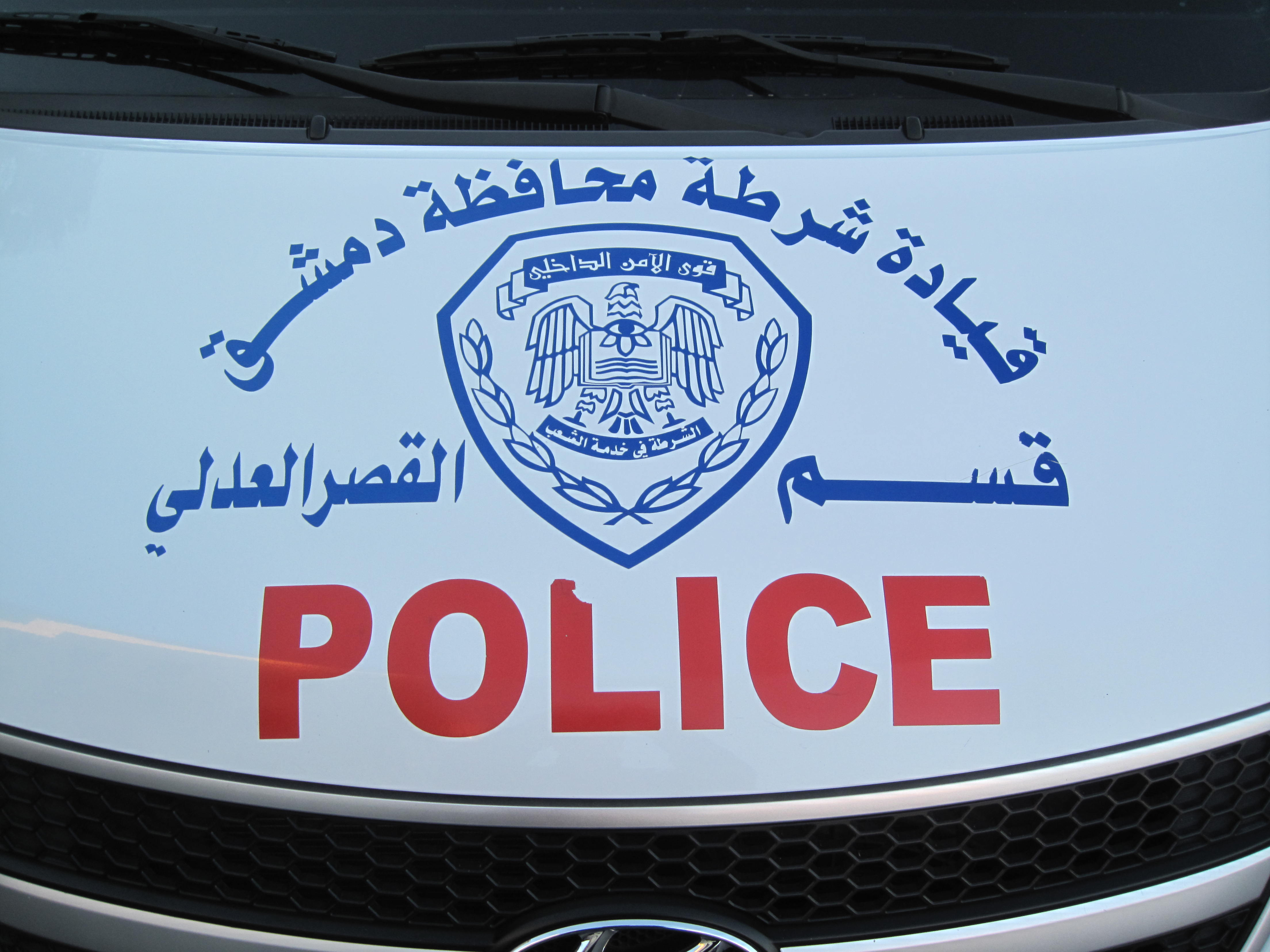
A Syrian police car bonnet, showing official emblem of the Damascus metro police.

The person who manages the police is the Director General, whose superior is the Minister of Interior through the Criminal Security Directorate. Special metropolitan police forces are in Damascus, Aleppo, and other major cities overseen directly by the Director General.

Alongside with other Directorates, the Ministry of Interior controls the Internal Security Forces, through the Criminal Security Directorate, which is organized into six separate divisions of police forces under a Director General: Administrative Police (Public Order Police), Emergency Police, Traffic police (whose official Day is on 4 May), Criminal Investigations, Human Trafficking Department, Electronic Criminal Branch and Riot police, as well as a fanfare and the Khan al-Asal Police Academy. The Internal Security Forces Day is on 29 May, the anniversary of French forces shelling the Parliament building in Damascus in 1945.

The internal security is partially separated from the police, the main internal security agencies of Interior Ministry are: Political Security Directorate and General Intelligence Directorate.

The Public Security Police collapsed in 2024 with the fall of the Assad regime and flight of Bashar al-Assad. The Hay'at Tahrir al-Sham brought its police force from Idlib to maintained order and security in the country. The new de facto rulers of Syria, Syrian Transitional Government, are making preparations to drastically reorganise Syria's police force.

== Territorial organization ==
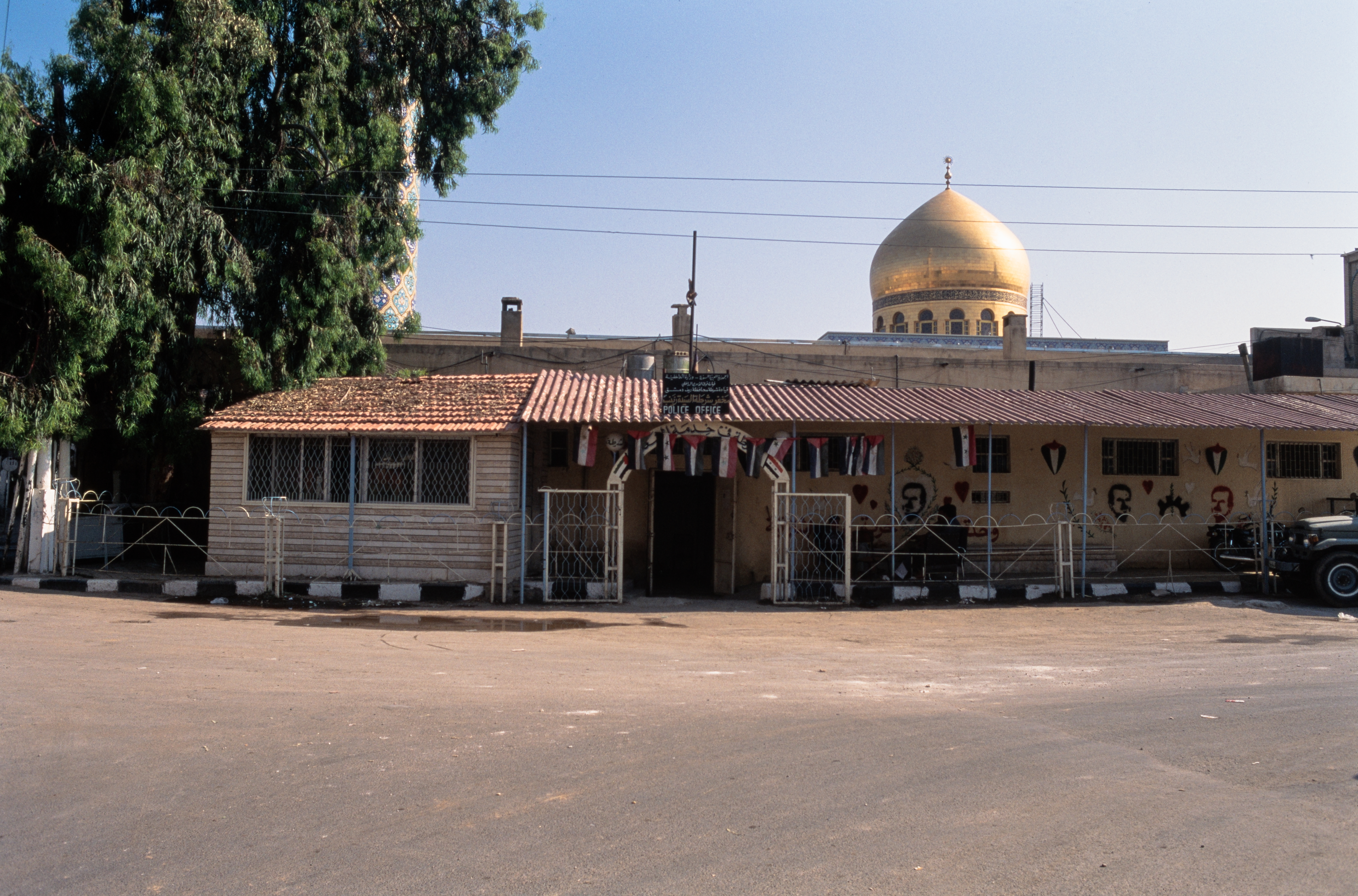
Police station in front of the Sayyidah Zaynab Mosque (1995).

At territorial level, the Syrian police is organized into Police Provincial Commands, each led by a major general, who is assisted by a brigadier general acting as a deputy. The Operations Department is directed by another Brigadier General. Districts are headed by Directors ranking from Colonel to Brigadier General, while subdistricts are led by junior officers.

As of October 2021, the Commander of Damascus region is Major General Hassan Jumaa. In 2021, commander of Rif Dimashq was Maj. Gen. Nizar Muhammad Hassan. Also, as of June 27, 2021 Brig. Gen. Dirar Dandel is the commander of Daraa Governorate and Maj. Gen. Deeb Marai Deeb commander of Aleppo Governorate.

In April 2024, new governorate police commanders were appointed. Maj. Gen. Bilal Mahmoud in Rif Dimashq, Maj. Gen. Hussein Jumaa in Hama, Brig. Gen. Yasser Abdel Rahman in Tartus, Brig. Gen. Qusay Tarraf in Deir ez-Zor, Brig. Gen. Abdul Qadir Sultan in Raqqa, and Brig. Gen. Hussein Al-Omar as assistant in Idlib. As of April 2024, Brig. Gen. Muhammad Yasser Shiha is the police commander of Al-Hasakah.

== Equipment, uniforms, personnel and training ==
=== Police equipment ===
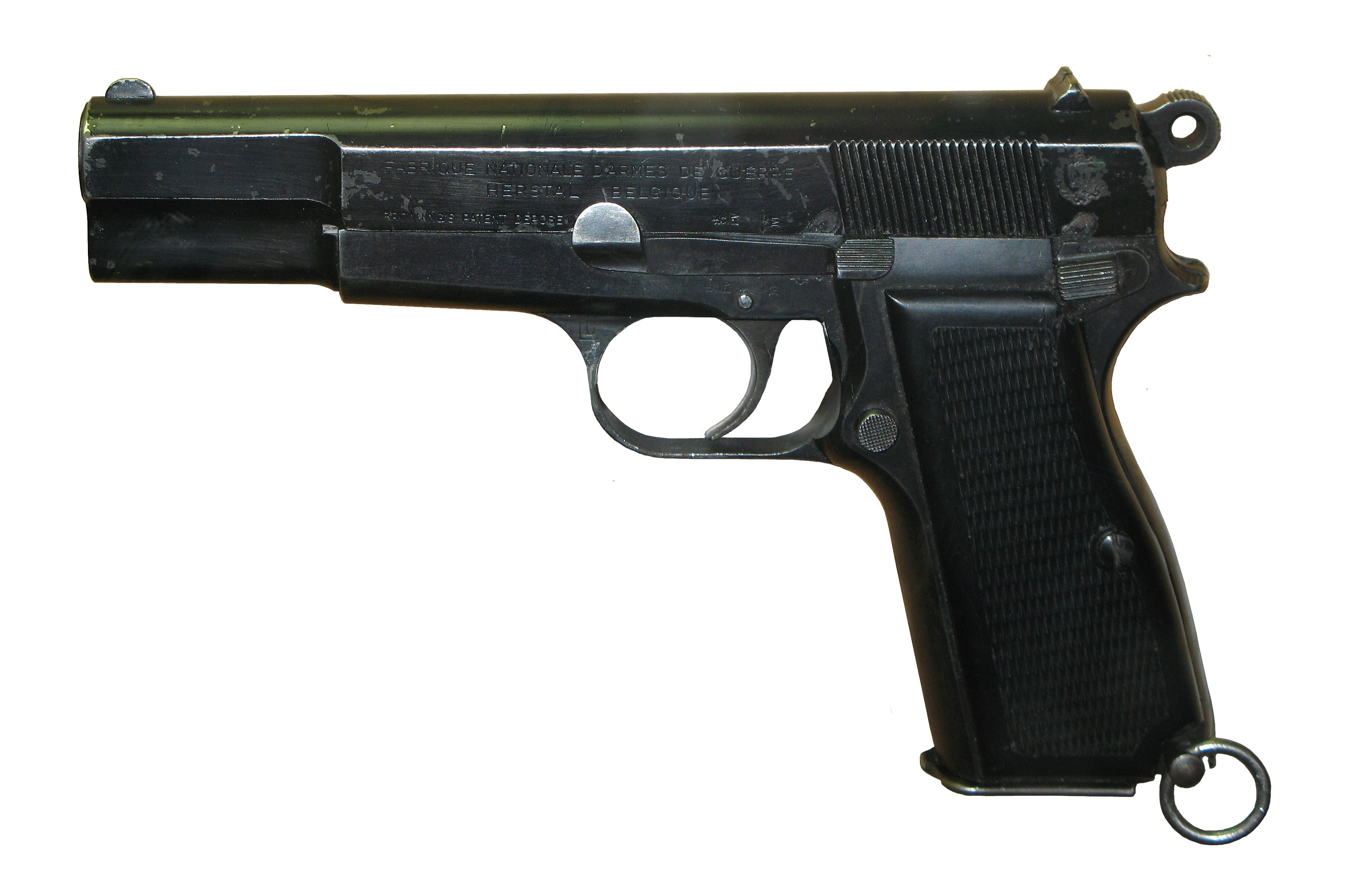
Browning Hi-Power, the main police service pistol.

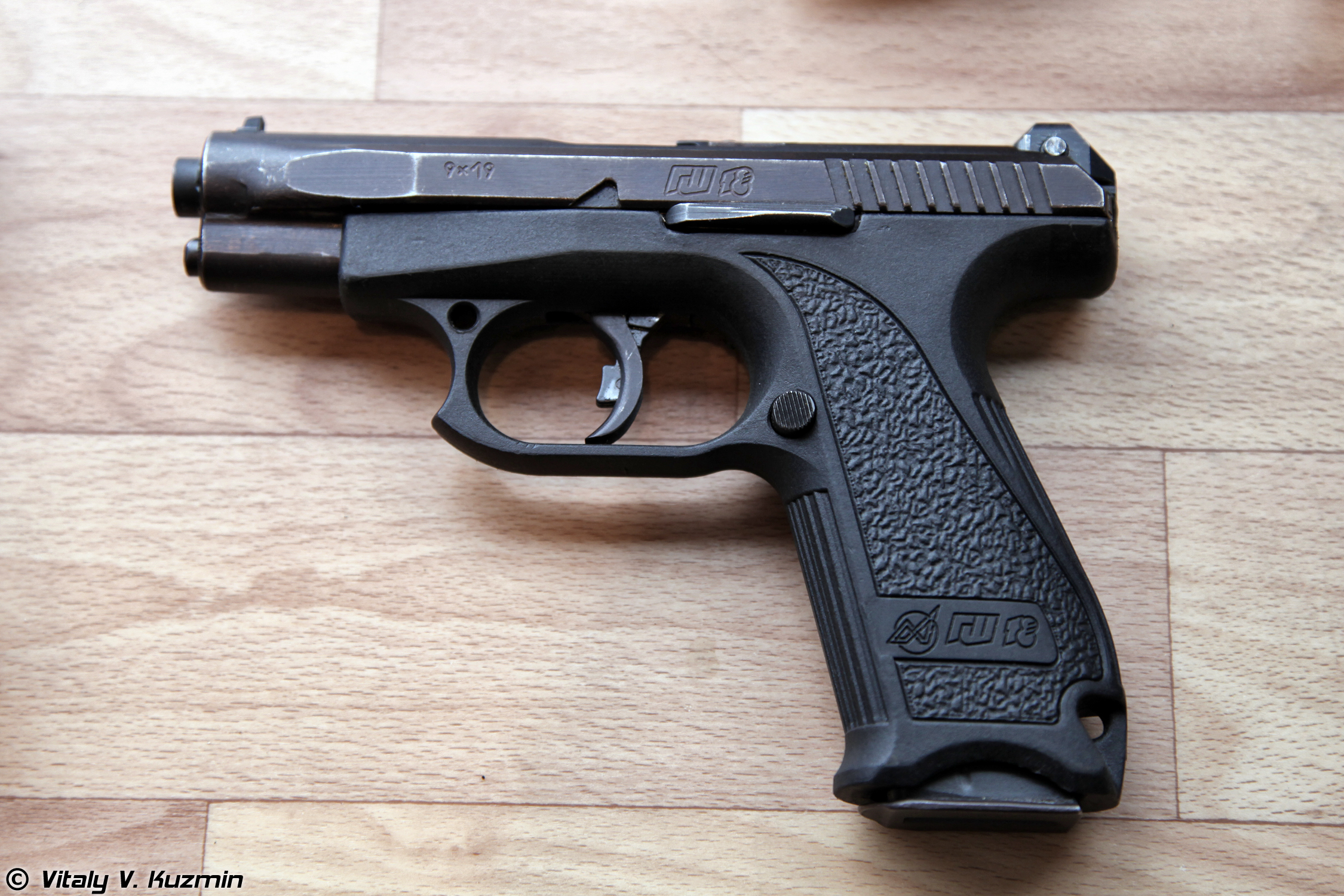
GSh-18, new police service pistol purchased from Russia.

Syrian police equipment is an issue. According to The Telegraph, which cites WikiLeaks, the Syrian police was supplied with advanced radio communications equipment, including 500 hand-held VS3000 radios, by Finmeccanica as late as 2011.

According to pro-militant website Zaman al-Wasl, in 2014 the Ministry of Interior received two Russian MI-171SH helicopters. Regular police units appear to be equipped with the AKM assault rifles and the Browning Hi-Power, Makarov PM, Stechkin-APS and GSh-18 pistols. Elite police units, such as Syrian Special Mission Forces, are equipped with AK-103, AK-104 assault rifles and Kord machine guns. Since 2023, SMF also uses Iranian copy of the M4 carbine, Fajr 224.

=== Police uniforms ===
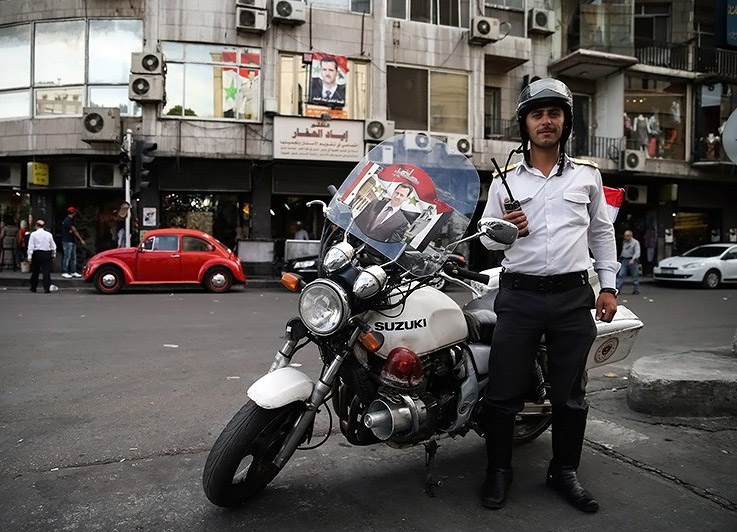
A Syrian traffic police officer in Damascus (2014).

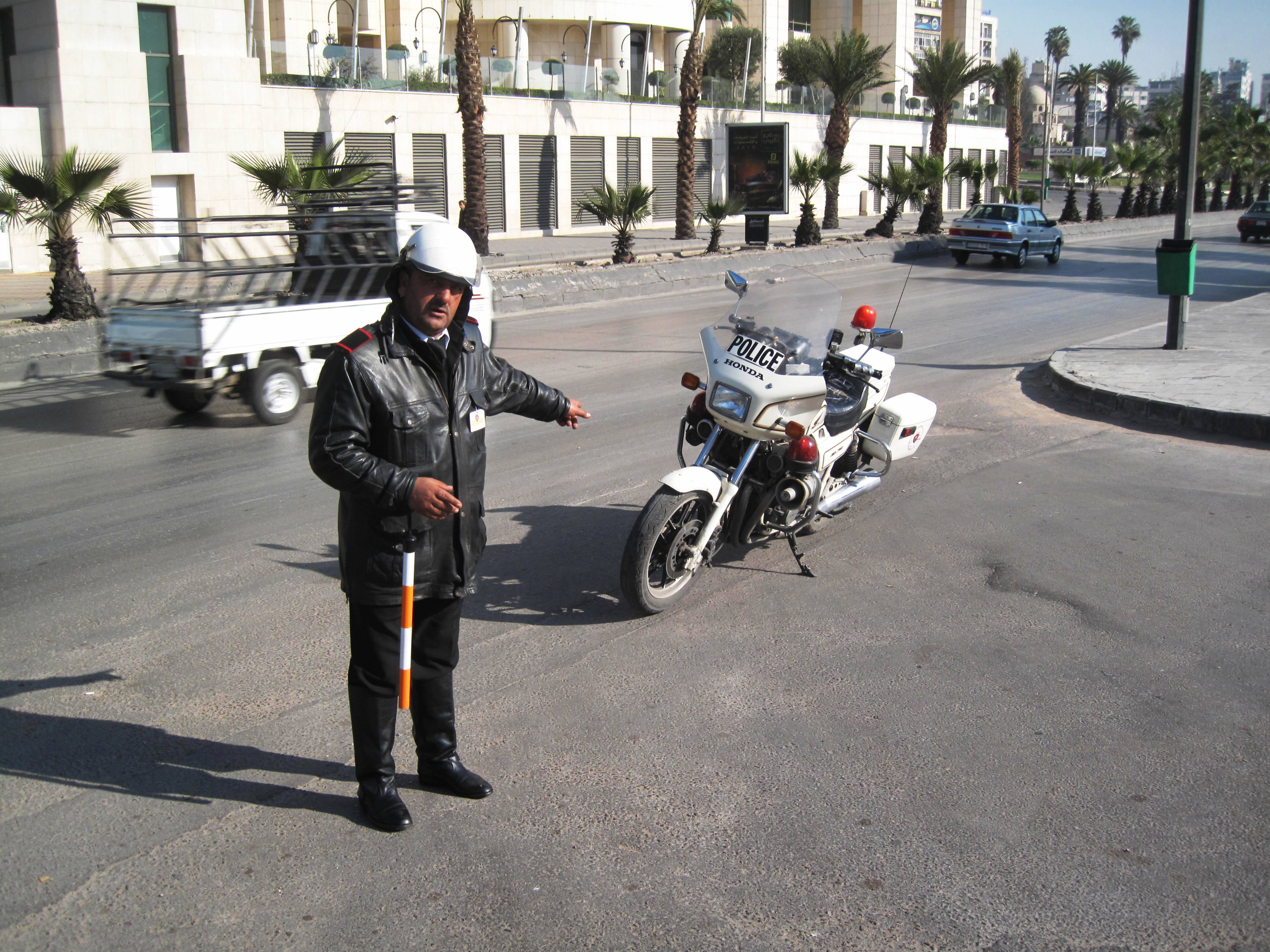
A traffic police officer carries out traffic in downtown Damascus.

Police uniforms vary according to the police branch which it is considered. Generally speaking, policemen assigned to security tasks wear the military olive green with garrison caps, but also camouflage. Since 2009, the Government has decided to change traffic policemen's uniforms from military olive green to grey pants, a white shirt with yellow shoulder patches and black belt and shoes. As of 2011, Anti-terrorism police wore dark blue uniforms.

Ceremonial uniforms consist in jackboots, white peaked cap and white tunic, with dark trousers with a red trim for infantry and motorcycle units, and white cavalry pants for mounted troopers. Its tasks are limited to the protection and enforcement of security. The Internal Security Forces are part of the Ministry of Interior but makes uses of military ranks.

=== Police vehicles ===
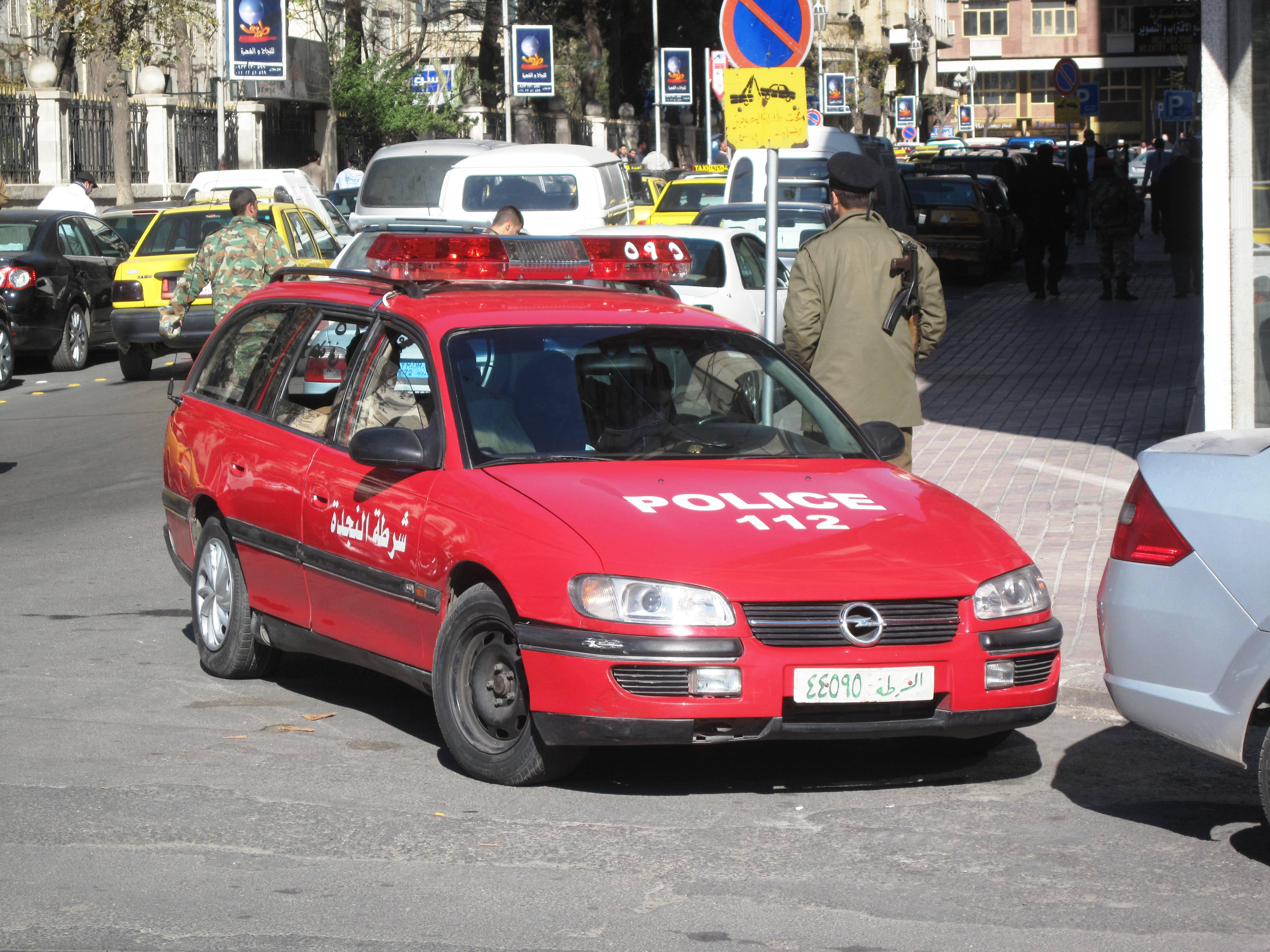
Opel Omega B1 Caravan emergency police patrol car

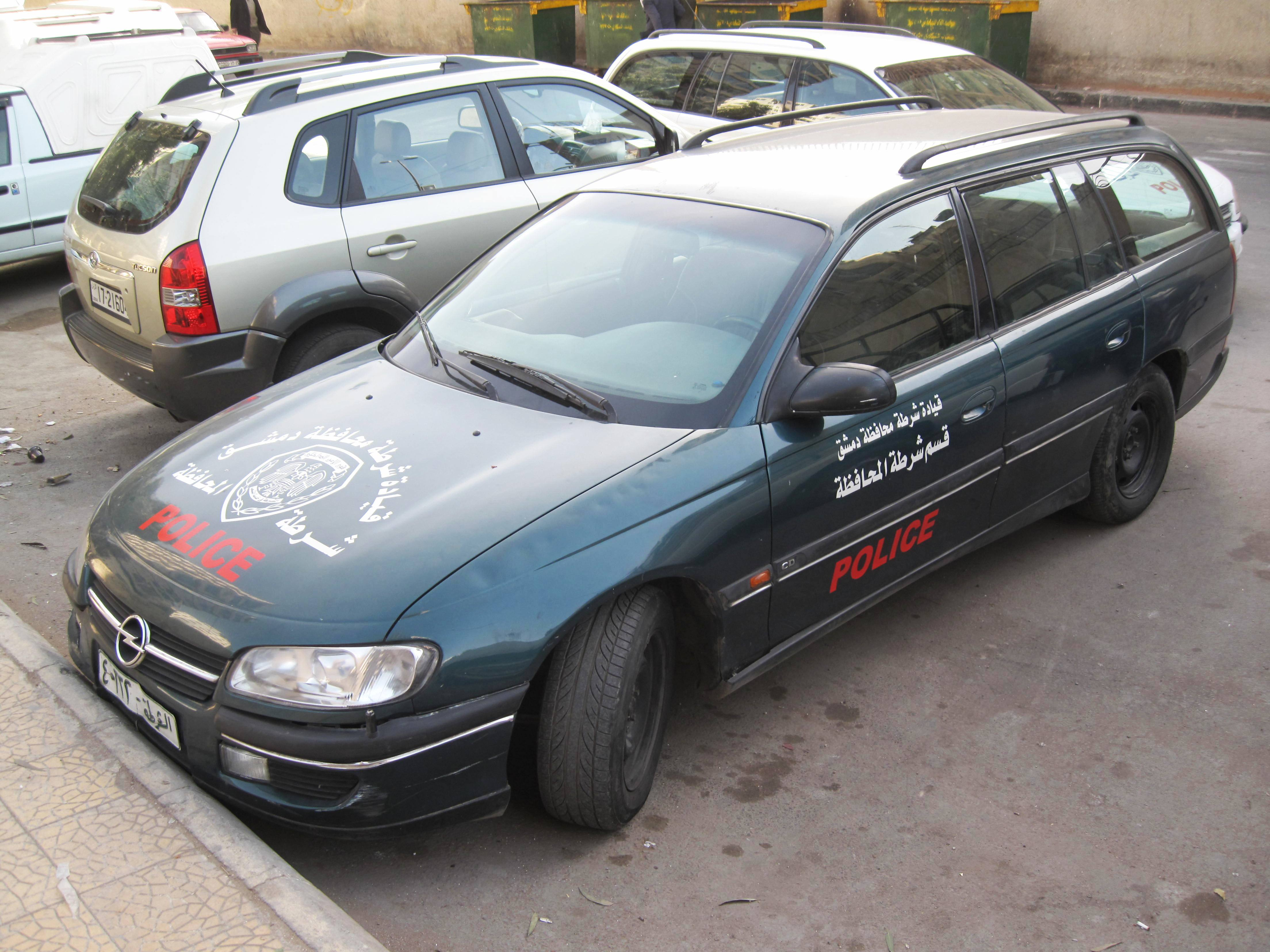
Opel Omega B2 Caravan public order police patrol car

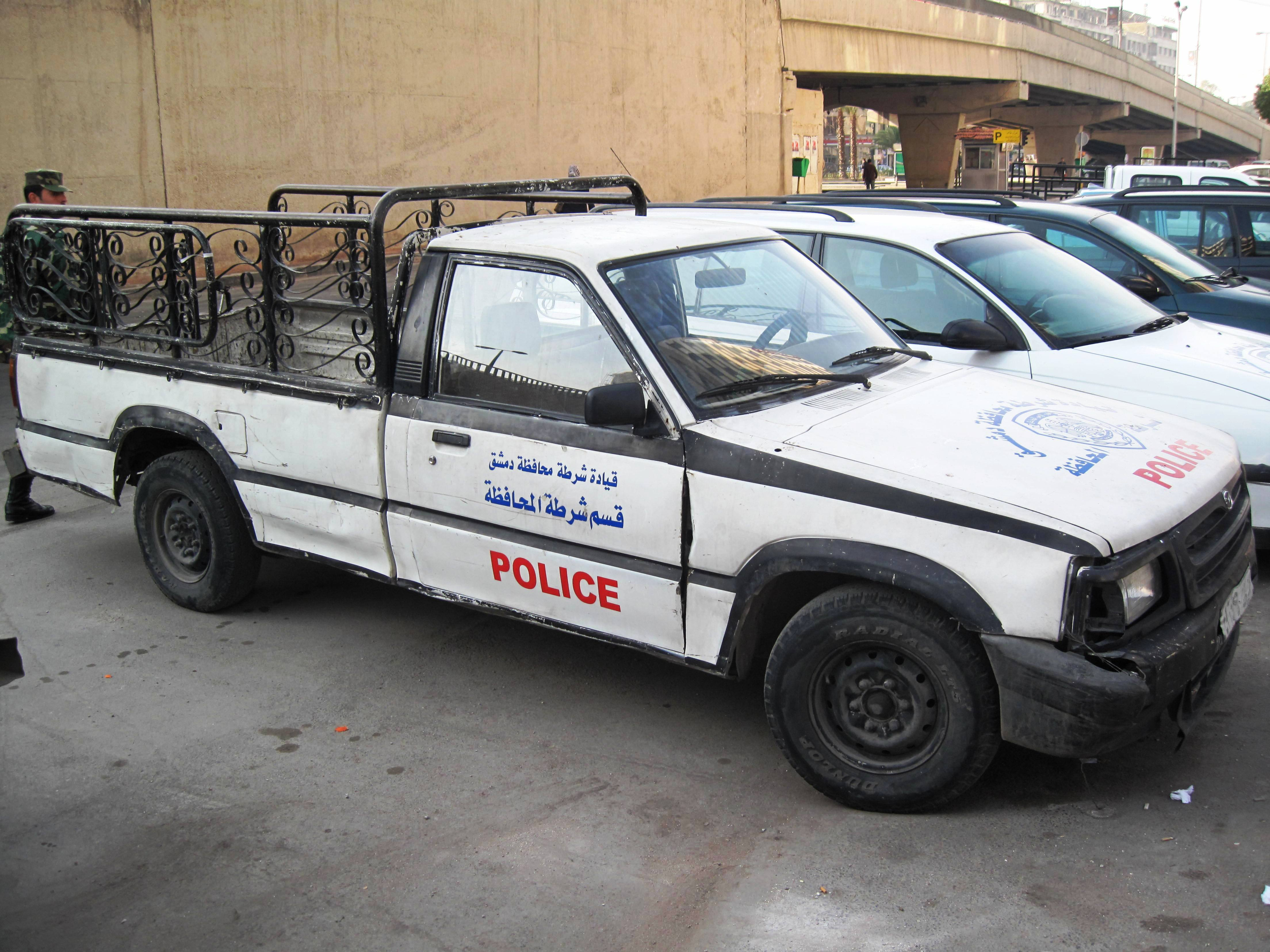
Mazda Courier pickup truck

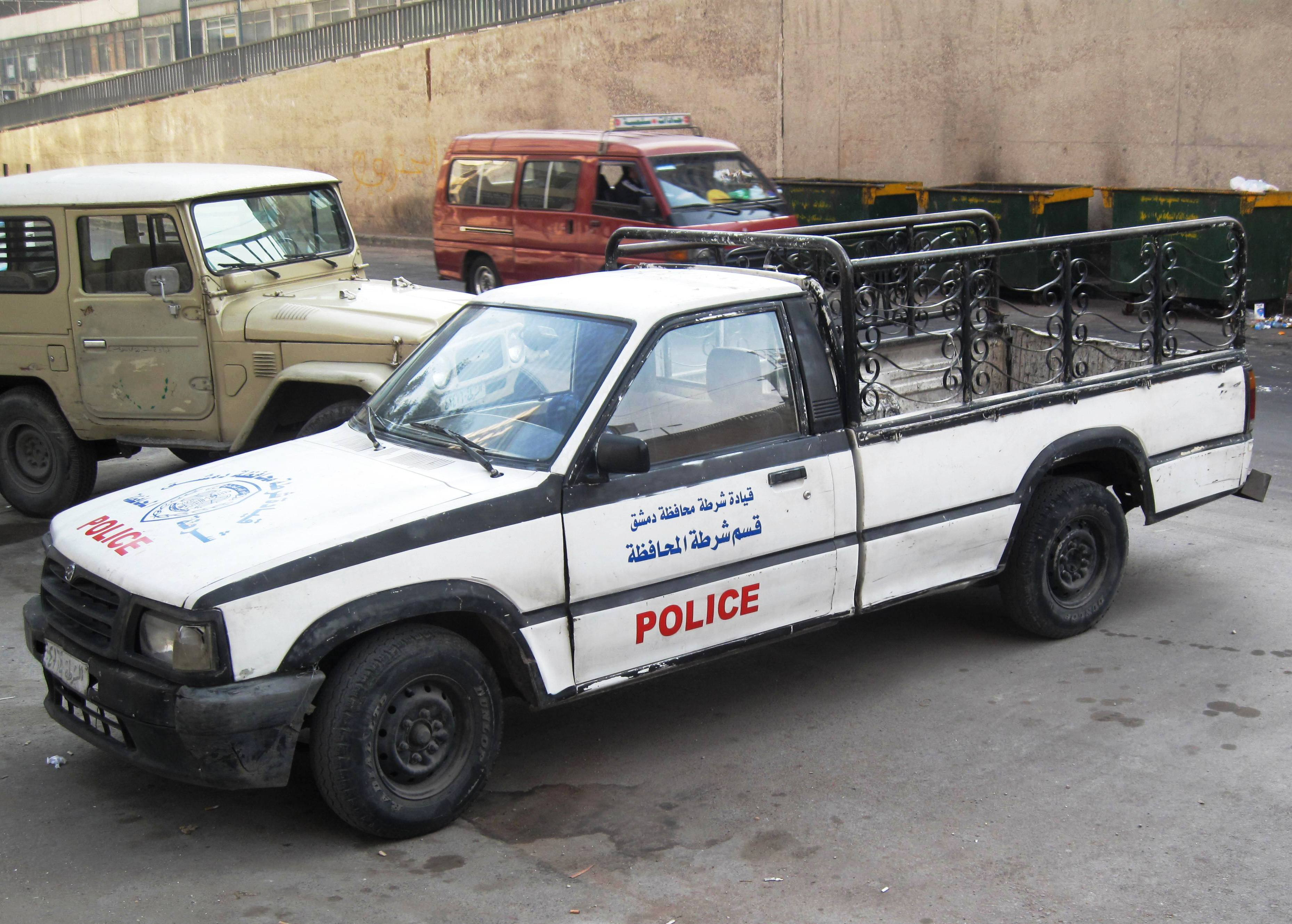
Mazda Courier pickup truck, in the background Toyota Land Cruiser FJ40 Hard Top

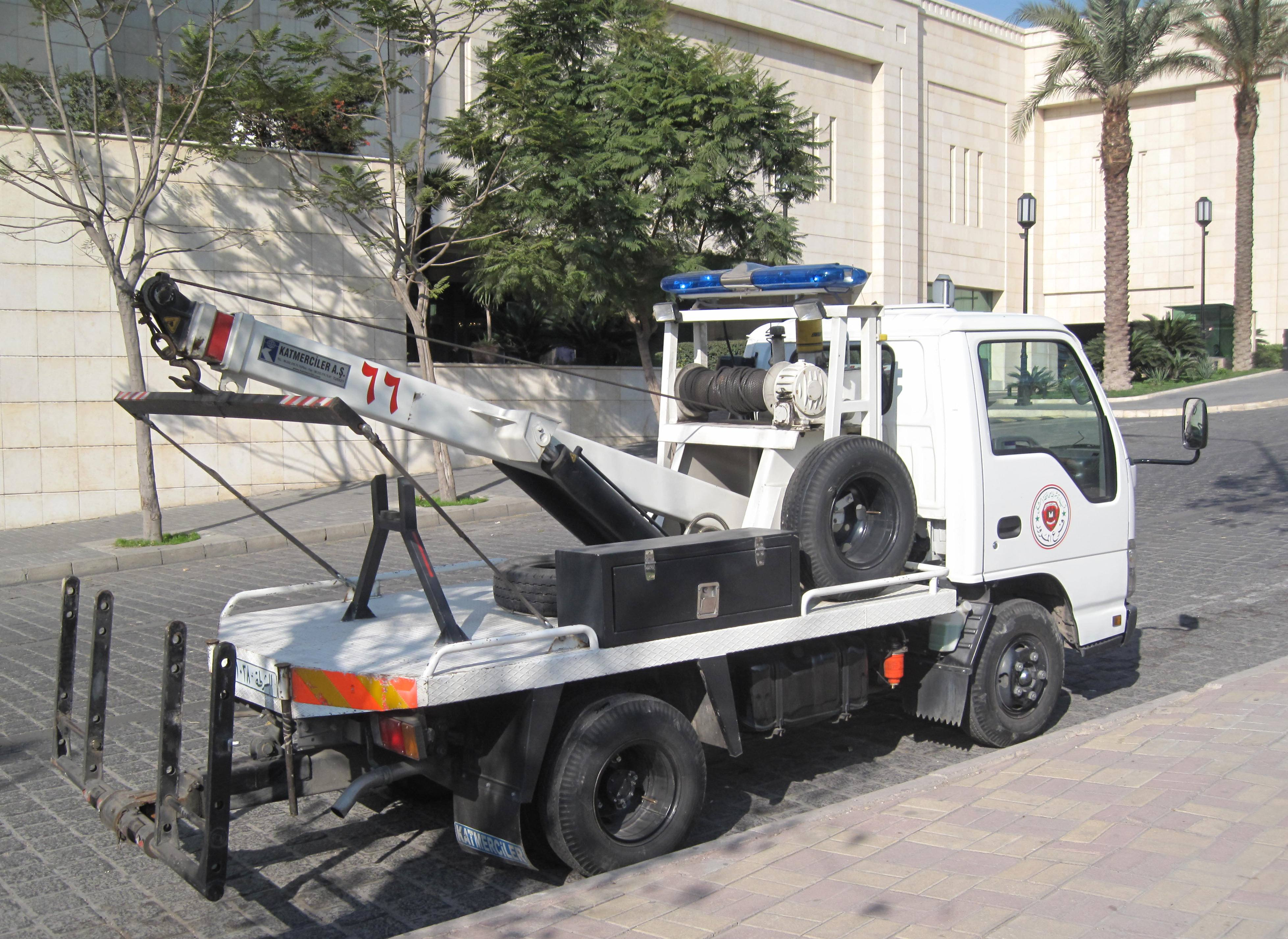
Police tow truck

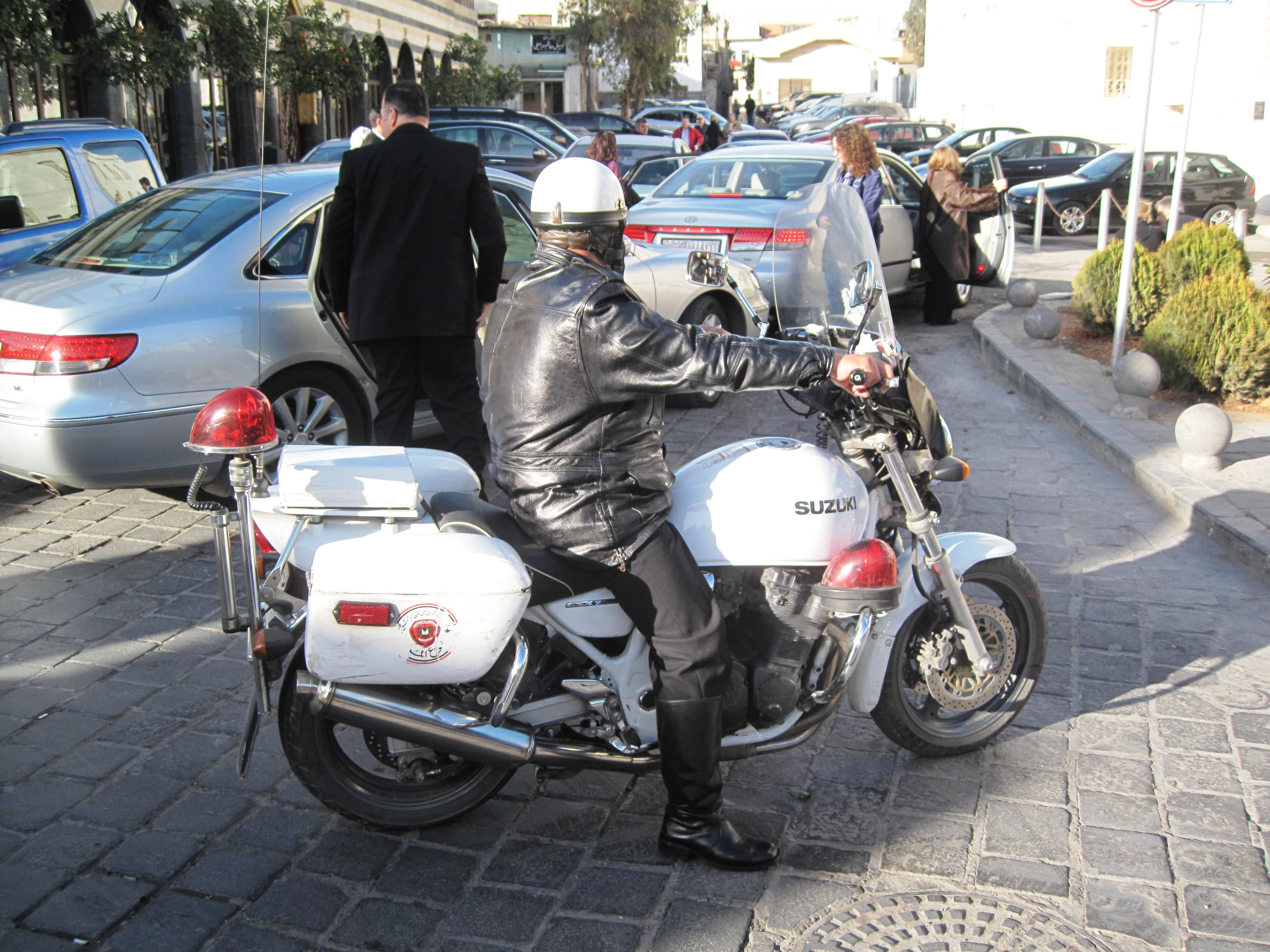
Suzuki police motorcycle

=== Personnel ===
As for total manpower of the Syrian police, in 2011 reportedly were about 100,000 police officers plus reserves, while 2016 estimates put the total force of 28,000 personnel, and 8,000 to 9,000 injured soldiers. Syrian women are allowed to serve (although not in frontline units) and to reach senior positions.

=== Operating methods ===
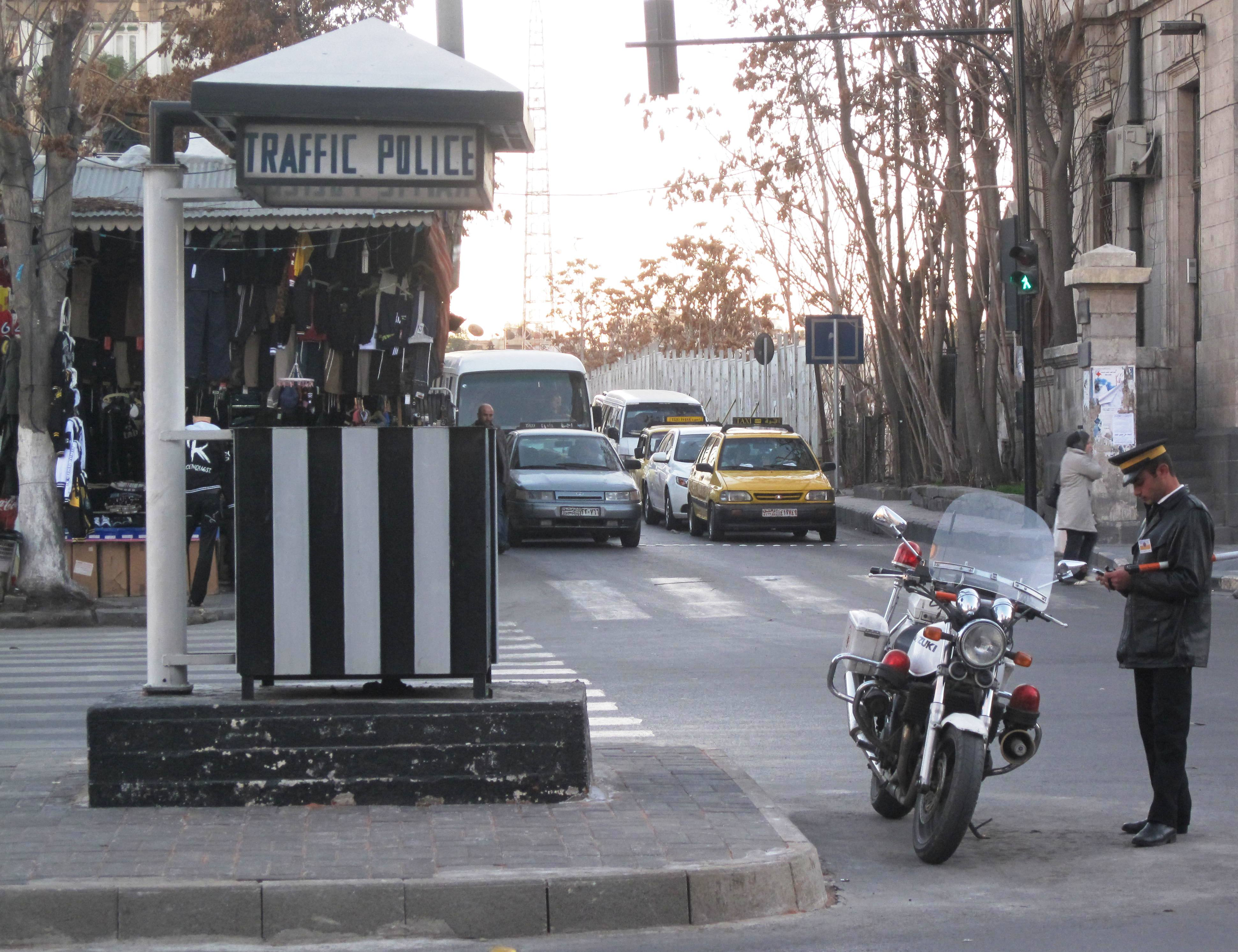
Police officer in standard brigadier hat and leather jacket.

The police reportedly undergo military-type and counter-terrorism training. Community policing is also a large element within the country of Syria. Citizens in Syria began using cyber community policing tactics via social media as a way to address the conflict happening around them. Doing so has given them some power to influence change in their environment. Their efforts demonstrate that global cyber community policing programs have the ability to connect communities and create social media networks that can effectively and proactively address, and hopefully prevent, threats to its citizens.

=== Training ===
The police reportedly undergo military-type and counter-terrorism training, having a high school in al-Hasakah. Education for all police personnel is provided at three institutes: central Police Training School in Damascus (Damascus Police College), Aleppo (Khan al-Asal Police Academy) and the Officers College in Homs, where junior officers are sent for six-month courses in specialized areas of expertise.

== Criminal procedure ==
Upon arrest, the individual or suspect is brought to a police station for processing and detained until a trial date is set. At the initial court hearing, which is weeks or months after the arrest, the accused may retain an attorney at personal expense or be assigned a court-appointed attorney, although lawyers are not ensured access to their clients before trial. The individual is then tried in court, where a judge renders a verdict. Civil and criminal defendants had the right to bail hearings and possible release from detention on their own recognizance. The prison code provides for prompt access to family members.

In 2024, Minister of Interior Maj. Gen. Mohammad Khaled al-Rahmoun issued a circular for all Interior Ministry officials, in which he stressed not to use violence when extracting confessions from arrested persons, in addition to informing the families of arrested persons of their whereabouts.

== Structure ==
Since 8 July 2019, the head of the Criminal Security Directorate is General Nasser Deeb, former head of the Hama branch of the Political Security Directorate and former assistant director of the Damascus branch. Within the Criminal Security Directorate there are seven police divisions and branches:

- Administrative Police Division (also known as Public Order Police: they are responsible for general security and deal with non-emergency situations);
- Emergency Police Division (deals with emergency situations, operating roving patrols. The emergency number is 112);
- Traffic Police Division (emergency number is 115);
- Riot Police Division (riot and crowd control);
- Criminal Security Department (in charge for general investigative police duties);
- Human Trafficking Department (in charge of combating human trafficking);
- Electronic Crime Department (in charge of combating computer and web-based crime. According to newspaper Al-Watan, the Electronic Crime Department has a dedicated cybercrime laboratory).

=== INTERPOL membership ===
At the central level, the Directorate is the body in charge for relations with INTERPOL, of which the country has been a member since 1953.

As of October 2021, Syria was readmitted to INTERPOL's global police communications network after being subjected to restrictive measures since 2011, thereby allowing Damascus to access databases, communicate with the other 195 members, and issue international arrest warrants, called "red notices". The Directorate has its own Commission for combating money laundering in cooperation with the Commission of the same name at the Central Bank of Syria.

=== Criminal Security Directorate ===
The Criminal Security Department is the subdivision of the Criminal Security Directorate which is in charge for general investigative police duties. Police records in Syria are maintained by the Ministry of Interior, Criminal Security Department and separate records are maintained by each jurisdiction: some jurisdictions are computerized, but there is no central computerized database. It is organized at the provincial level.

Within the Criminal Security there is a subdivision known as the "Department of Protection of Public Moralities", tasked with investigating suspect homosexuals and their activities. Between 2021 and 2024, the director of the Criminal Security Department was Maj. Gen. Hussein Jumaa. In April 2024, Major General Turki Al-Saeed was named as a Director of the Criminal Security Department.

=== Riot police ===
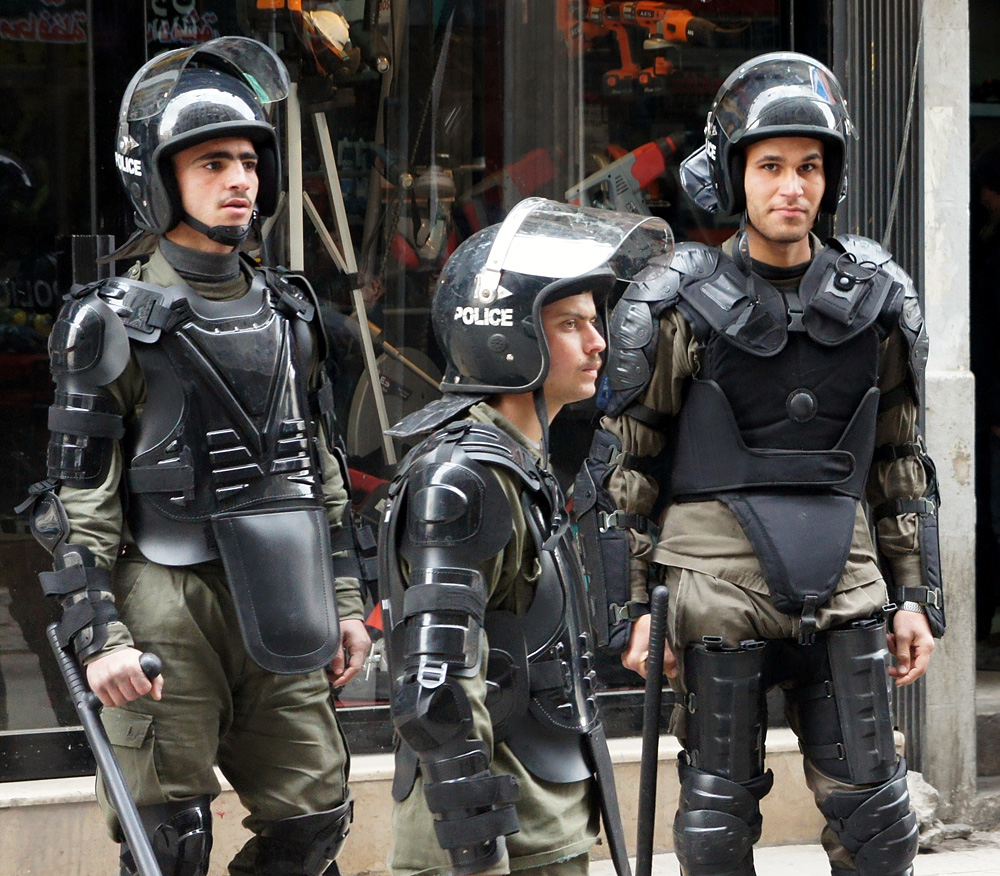
Syrian riot police in Damascus (2012).

The Riot police (Arabic: شرطة مكافحة الشغب) is part of the Criminal Security Directorate. The Riot police core missions are to provide tactical security, crowd control and riot control for demonstrations. In Damascus, the Riot police is also used in order to protect diplomatic missions against protestors.

Syrian Riot Police is organized into battalions and brigades. During the Syrian war, the riot police has been used in order to break early protests; according to pro-opposition opinionists, it even opened fire on demonstrators.

Syrian riot police is issued typical riot equipment, such as riot helmets, tonfa, rubber batons, shields, body armor, bulletproof vests, rubber bullets and plastic bullets. Other heavier equipment includes armoured personnel carriers, water cannons, tear gas and pepper spray. The Riot police is also reportedly equipped with armoured vehicles. Policemen assigned to security and riot control duty wear the military olive green with garrison caps, but also camouflage.

=== Anti-Narcotics Directorate ===
The Anti-Narcotics Directorate, independent from the Criminal Security Directorate since 1996, has responsibility for anti-drug law enforcement and intelligence gathering.

The anti-narcotics establishment was separated from the police in 2002 and made an independent Directorate within the Ministry of Interior. Before the outbreak of the Syrian War, the Government also operated regional counternarcotics offices in Aleppo province and in Homs province, with plans to open offices in the remaining provinces.

The work of the Anti-Narcotics Directorate is specialised in guiding and coordinating efforts aimed at fighting the illicit traffic, plantation and use of drugs, plans the fight against drugs in coordination with other authorities, executes international anti-drugs operations, and collects information on drug crimes.

As of 2006, the Anti-Narcotics Directorate was subdivided into:

- Internal anti-drug Division;
- International anti-drug Division;
- Information Division;
- Rehabilitation and training Division.

=== Specialist organizations ===
Aside of the general police, there are also other specialized organizations, such as the Gendarmerie for control in rural areas and the Border Guard for border control (especially the Syrian-Iraqi border), up to 10,000-men strong. These latter two organizations have a military character.

For ceremonial duties, the Internal Security Forces also have a cavalry battalion based in Damascus. Other element of the internal security, albeit separated from the Internal Security Forces and the Ministry of Interior, is the Military Police.

== Syrian Special Mission Forces ==
During the Syrian Civil War, the Ministry of Interior established a quick reaction unit, the Syrian Special Mission Forces. According to Al-Masdar News, the Special Mission Forces have been set up by Russian advisers and are mainly, although not exclusively, intended for urban security actions, as well as carrying out force protection and security operations against terrorist activities.

== See also ==
- Ministry of Interior (Syria)
- Law enforcement in Syria
- Judiciary of Syria
