= Special Missions Department (Syria) =

Syrian rapid reaction force

- إدارة المهام الخاصة
- Active: 2025–present
- Country: Syria
- Branch: Ministry of Interior
- Type: Rapid reaction force
- Role: Combat
- Garrison/HQ: Damascus

The Special Missions Department (SMD) (Arabic: إدارة المهام الخاصة) is a rapid reaction force administered under the Syrian Ministry of Interior.

== History ==
On September 2, 2025, the Ministry of Interior announced the reopening of recruitment for the Special Missions Department. Eligibility criteria included an age range of 18 to 24 years, possession of at least a high school certificate or equivalent, and physical fitness suitable for security and combat duties. Applicants were required to have no criminal record, good conduct, and no prior dismissal from public service for disciplinary reasons.

The training program was set to last one year, combining theoretical and practical instruction. The announcement also indicated the resumption of the directorate's activities, which had been suspended since 8 December 2024 as the Syrian Special Mission Forces.

== See also ==
- Law enforcement in Syria
- Internal Security Forces (Syria)
