= Internal Security Forces (Syria) =

Internal Security Forces قوى الأمن الداخلي

Agency overview
- Formed: 2019 (General Security Service); 2024 (current form)
- Preceding agencies: Levantine Special Forces; Free Syrian Police; Public Security Police
- Employees: 50,000

Jurisdictional structure
- National agency: Syrian Arab Republic
- Operations jurisdiction: Syrian Arab Republic
- Population: 18,437,288
- Governing body: Syria
- General nature: Civilian police

Operational structure
- Overseen by: Government of Syria
- Headquarters: Damascus, Syria
- Minister responsible: Anas Khattab, Minister of Interior
- Parent agency: Ministry of Interior

The Internal Security Forces (Arabic: قوى الأمن الداخلي, romanized: Quwā al-ʾAmn ad-Dāḵilī; abbr.: ISF) are the national police service and internal security force of Syria.

It is primarily responsible for law enforcement, protecting civilians and properties alongside investigating crimes with assistance from the General Intelligence Service, and for drug-related cases, the Drug Enforcement Department. It also performs other routine police functions, including traffic control. It is administered and controlled by the Ministry of Interior.

== History ==
Logo from 2019 to 2025

The Internal Security Forces, or known as the General Security Service at the time, was the police force of Hay'at Tahrir al-Sham (HTS), which controlled areas in Northern Syria, replacing the Free Syrian Police before it was transferred to the interior ministry of the Syrian Salvation Government in April 2024. Its roots could be traced to 1945 when the Public Security Police was formed. A police academy was opened in September 2023 and produced its first batch of graduates in August 2024.

The Ba'athist-led Public Security Police collapsed in 2024 with the fall of the Assad regime. HTS brought the General Security Service from Idlib to maintain order and security in recently captured areas in the country. In January 2025, the new de facto rulers of Syria, the Syrian caretaker government, made preparations to reorganize the General Security Service as Syria's police force, including Sharia as part of the police training.

On 29 November 2025, the Syrian Ministry of Interior presented several new police vehicles. The vehicles, all Hyundai models, include:

- Armoured variants assigned to the Diplomatic Security and Officials Protection units;
- Vehicles for the Criminal Investigations Department;
- Patrol cars for the Road Security (traffic police) branch.

On 30 November 2025, the Syrian Arab News Agency published images of several new vehicle designs for the Ministry of Interior's vehicles, including the vehicles of the Internal Security Forces.

== Incidents ==
=== Involvement in the 2025 massacres of Alawites ===
In March 2025, members of the at the time General Security Service were accused of taking part in the 2025 massacres against Alawite civilians along Syria's coastal regions.

=== Death of Mohammed Hossam al-Din Ghamira ===
On August 2026, Mohammed Hossam al-Din Ghamira was pronounced dead at Latakia University Hospital due to his injuries and complications as a result of haemophilia after he was beaten by several police officers whilst under arrest at a police station in Al-Haffah, Latakia. According to both Interior Minister Anas Khattab and Minister of Emergency and Disaster Management Raed al-Saleh, the officers responsible for his death were later arrested for further investigation.

== Equipment ==
=== Protective gear ===
Name	Photo	Origin	Notes
Ruyin-5		Iran	Standard issue.
Future Assault Shell Technology		United States	Standard issue.

=== Small arms ===
==== Pistols ====
Name	Photo	Origin	Cartridge	Notes
Makarov		USSR	9×18mm Makarov	

==== Battle and semi-auto rifles ====
Name	Photo	Origin	Cartridge	Notes
SKS		USSR	7.62×39mm	Gold-plated variant. Used for ceremonial purposes.
Heckler & Koch G3		Germany	7.62×51mm NATO	Donated by Turkey.

==== Assault rifles ====
Name	Photo	Origin	Cartridge	Notes
AK-47		USSR	7.62×39mm	Standard issue. Also used by special forces.
AKM		USSR	7.62×39mm	Standard issue.
M4 carbine		United States	5.56×45mm NATO	Seen during clashes with Islamic State forces.

=== Vehicles ===
Name	Photo	Origin	Notes
Hyundai Tucson		South Korea	
Mitsubishi Pajero Sport		Japan	Seen in use by traffic security police.
Chevrolet Suburban		United States	Seen in use by diplomatic security forces.
Mitsubishi Triton		Japan	
Nissan Patrol		Japan	Seen in use by traffic security police.
Hyundai Staria		South Korea	
Toyota Land Cruiser Prado		Japan	Seen in use by special forces.
Fengon 580		China	Used by the Tourist Police.

== See also ==
- Law enforcement in Syria
- Ministry of Interior (Syria)
