= Abkhazia–Syria relations =

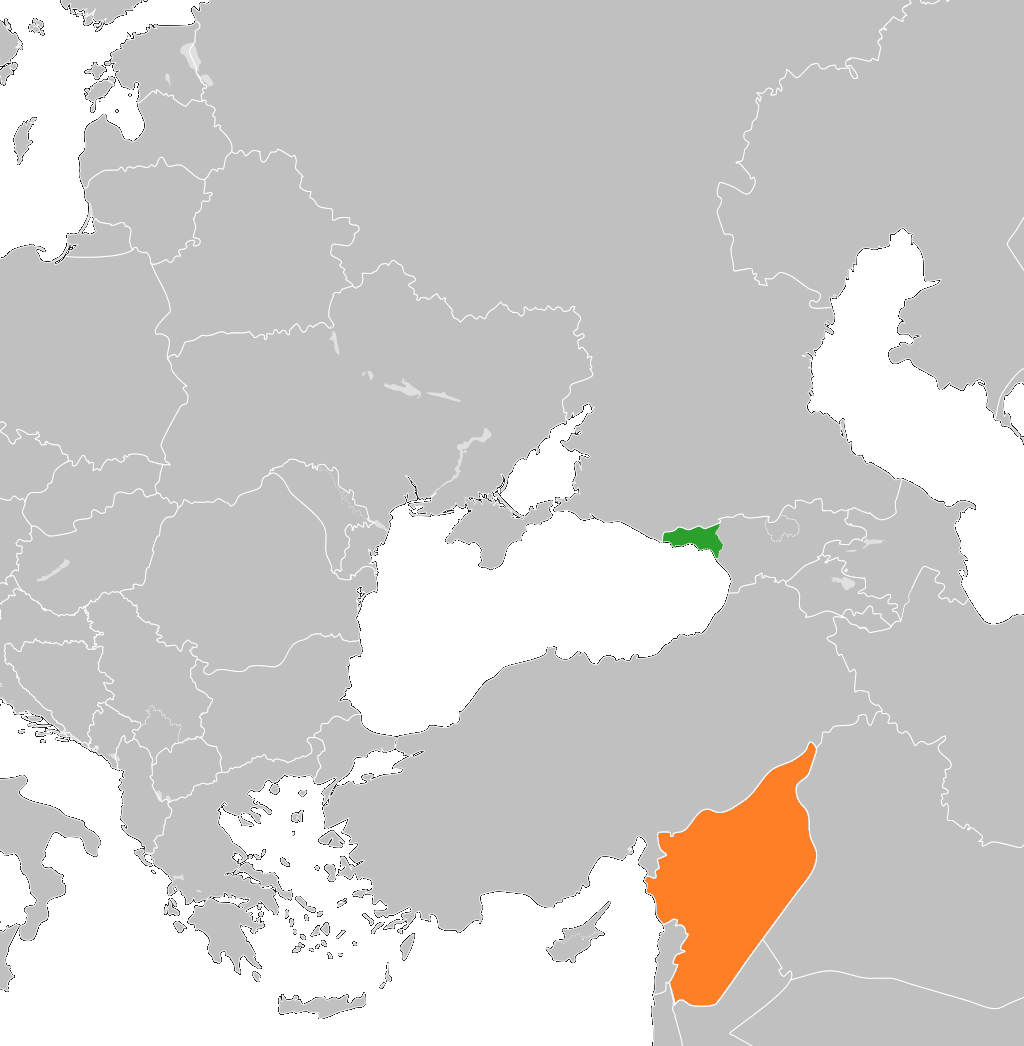

- Abkhazia: Syria

Abkhazia–Syria relations are the bilateral relationship between the Republic of Abkhazia and Syria.

Ba'athist Syria recognised Abkhazia on 29 May 2018, both countries established diplomatic relations on an embassy-level. Abkhazia has an embassy in Damascus.

== Ba'athist Syria ==
In 2008, Syrian president Bashar al-Assad said that Syria agrees "with the essence of the Russian position" in the Abkhaz conflict. In 2013, Abkhazia appointed a Representative of the Abkhaz Foreign Ministry in Syria.

In 2015, the Abkhaz Foreign Minister met Syrian Ambassador to Russia Riad Haddad in Moscow and afterwards said that his government believes Syria will recognise the former Georgian republic of Abkhazia's independence as a sovereign country in the future. In November 2016, President of Abkhazia Raul Khajimba stressed his country's support to Syria in its "war against international terrorism". On the same occasion, Khajimba called Syria a "sisterly country". Nonetheless, Abkhazia supports the re-migration of Syrian citizens of Abkhaz descent back into Abkhazia. In the first five years of the Civil War, about 500 Syrians remigrated to Abkhazia. In December 2015, the Foreign Minister of Abkhazia met with Ambassador Extraordinary and Plenipotentiary of the Syrian Arab Republic in Russia Mr. Riyad Haddad and they discussed the remigration of Syrian citizens of Abkhaz descent. In December 2016, the first match in Freestyle wrestling between national teams Abkhazia and Syria was held in Sokhumi. In August 2017, Abkhazia provided humanitarian aid to Syria. Also in August 2017, an Abkhaz delegation led by Abkhaz Foreign Minister Daur Kove went to Damascus and met with Syrian Prime Minister Imad Khamis. Parliamentary delegations discussed the strengthening of parliamentary relations between both countries. The same month, Abkhaz products were presented at the Damascus International Fair. In November 2017, a Syrian delegation was in Abkhazia and the Abkhaz minister of economy Adgur Ardzinba, said he was preparing a free trade agreement between Syria and Abkhazia. In December 2017, there were first reports that a Syrian recognition of Abkhaz independence may be possible.

In May 2018, the Syrian government recognised Abkhazia, resulting in condemnation from Georgia and the United States. As a result, Georgia severed ties with Syria.

In early September 2018, President Abkhazia, Raul Khajimba paid a state visit to Damascus, Syria. Khajimba met with Bashar al-Assad and high dignitaries in Damascus. Bashar al-Assad decorated Raul Khajimba with the Umayyad Order, the highest decoration of the Syrian Arab Republic. Raul Khajimba also decorated Bashar al-Assad with the Apzha Order I Degree, the highest Abkhazia state decoration. The leaders of the two countries also exchanged gifts and presents from both nations. Abkhazia and Syria agreed to a Comprehensive Treaty of Strategic Partnership and Diplomatic Relationship between Abkhazia and Syria.

The exchange between Abkhazia and Syria has increased since recognition in late 2018. In late September 2019, a delegation consisting of Syrian businessmen and parliament members visited Sokhumi to honor the Independence and Victory Day of Abkhazia. In October 2020, Abkhazia opened an embassy in Damascus.

In May 2021, the Abkhaz president Aslan Bzhania visited Syria on a state visit and met with Bashar al-Assad. In December 2023, Abkhazian Foreign Minister Inal Ardzinba visit Syria and was received by the Syrian President. In January 2024, consular section at Abkhaz Embassy has been established. In February 2024, newly appointed Ambassador of Abkhazia to Syria Muhammad Ali present credentials to Syrian President Bashar al-Assad.

== Post-Ba'athist Syria ==
The Assad regime collapsed in December 2024. With the vast majority of Russians leaving Syria after 8 December 2024, Abkhazian diplomatic personnel were withdrawn from Syria on 15 December 2024.

On 31 January 2025, Georgian opposition parties urged Syria to revoke recognition of Abkhazia and South Ossetia. There were also calls for the Syrian transitional government to withdraw its recognition of Abkhazia by U.S. Congressman Joe Wilson.

In May 2025 Syrian Minister of Foreign Affairs and Compatriots Abroad Asaad al-Shaibani congratulated Oleg Bartsits on his appointment as Minister of Foreign Affairs of the Republic of Abkhazia and hoped that they will be able to strengthen bilateral relations between the two countries and deepen joint cooperation in various areas. Diplomats from Embassy of Abkhazia participated in a diplomatic table tennis tournament in Damascus taking place under the auspices of the MFA of Syria. The Abkhaz Ambassador to Syria Muhammad Ali held a meeting in June 2025 Marwan Al-Halabi, Minister of Higher Education and Scientific Research of Syria and discussed the relationship of scientific research cooperation between the two countries. Abkhazian Foreign Minister Oleg Bartsits has met with Assad al-Shaibani in Damascus, where they discussed Abkhazian–Syrian cooperation and current affairs and developing trade via the sea.

During the OSCE Parliamentary Assembly meeting in July 2025 in Porto, Portugal, it adopted the Porto Declaration calling on the Syrian government to withdraw recognition of Abkhazia and South Ossetia and recognize Georgia's territorial integrity.

In August 2025, delegation of Abkhazia headed by Oleg Bartsits took part in the opening ceremony of the 62nd Damascus International Fair, they were are participating at the invitation of the Syrian Government and President Ahmed al-Sharaa. Abkhazia was one of 20 countries to participate in the Damascus International Fair.

While Abkhazia has been accepting students from Syria to study at the Abkhazian State University that for the second year in a row, during September 2025 new Syrian students headed there.

== See also ==
- Foreign relations of Abkhazia
- Foreign relations of Syria
