= Drug Enforcement Department (Syria) =

Syrian law enforcement agency

Drug Enforcement Department إدارة مكافحة المخدرات
- Emblem of Syria

Agency overview
- Formed: 8 December 2024
- Superseding agency: Anti-Narcotics Directorate (Ba'athist Syria)

Jurisdictional structure
- Operations jurisdiction: Syria

Operational structure
- Agency executive: Khaled Eid, Director
- Parent agency: Ministry of Interior

The Drug Enforcement Department (Arabic: إدارة مكافحة المخدرات, formerly known and occasionally still referred to as the Drug Enforcement Administration), is a Syrian law enforcement agency administered under the Ministry of Interior tasked with combatting drug trafficking within Syria, occasionally cooperating with other similar agencies in neighbouring countries.

== History ==
The Drug Enforcement Department was established sometime after the fall of the Ba'athist-led regime on 8 December 2024, succeeding the Anti-Narcotics Directorate. Under Ba'athist rule, illegal drug trafficking and production, particularly fenethylline, was prevalent throughout Syria, most with government support as it saw the illegal drug trade as a main revenue source under sanctions alongside as political leverage for neighbouring countries.
