= Mohammad Khaled al-Rahmoun =

Syrian politician

His Excellency Mohammad Khaled al-Rahmoun
- محمد خالد الرحمون

Minister of Interior
- In office 26 November 2018 – 10 December 2024
- President: Bashar al-Assad
- Prime Minister: Imad Khamis; Hussein Arnous; Mohammad Ghazi al-Jalali
- Preceded by: Mohammad al-Shaar
- Succeeded by: Mohammad Abdul Rahman

Director of Political Security Directorate
- In office 2017 – 26 November 2018
- President: Bashar al-Assad
- Preceded by: Nasser Ali
- Succeeded by: Hossam Louka

Personal details
- Born: 1 April 1957 (age 69) Khan Shaykhun, Idlib Governorate, Syrian Republic
- Party: Ba'ath Party
- Education: Homs Military Academy

Military service
- Allegiance: Ba'athist Syria
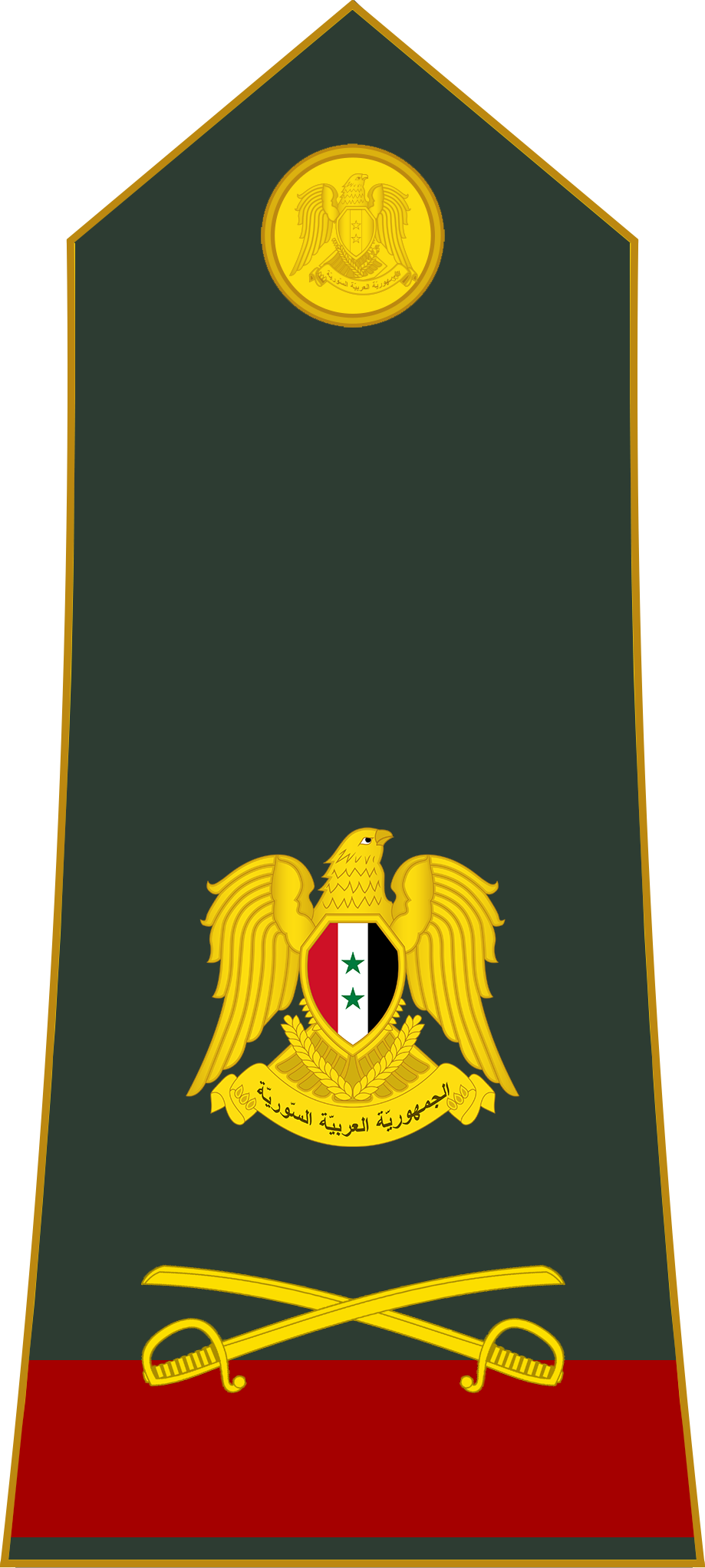
- Rank: Major General
- Battles/wars: Syrian Civil War

Mohammad Khaled al-Rahmoun (Arabic: محمد خالد الرحمون, born 1 April 1957) is a former military commander, and served as Syrian Minister of the Interior prior to the fall of the Assad regime.

== Career and education ==
He joined the military, where he graduated from the War College with the rank of major in air defense and was assigned to the Air Force Intelligence Directorate.

In 2004, he assumed office of director at the Air Force Intelligence Department in Daraa, with the rank of lieutenant colonel, then he rose through the military ranks and security positions until he assumed the position as director of the Air Force Intelligence Branch in the southern region located in the city of Harasta in 2011. During the Syrian Civil War, he was held responsible for numerous human rights violations in Daraa governorate, including arbitrary arrests, torture, forced disappearances, and indiscriminate shelling of towns, causing thousands of civilians to be displaced. In mid-2015, by decree of Bashar al-Assad, al-Rahmoun was appointed as head of the Political Security Directorate of the Syrian Interior Ministry.

On 26 November 2018, he was promoted to the rank of Major General and appointed Minister of Interior in Imad Khamis government, succeeding Major General Mohammad al-Shaar.

On 7 December 2024, during the Syrian opposition offensives approaching Damascus, al-Rahmoun downplayed the threat to the capital by stating that "there is a very strong security and military cordon on the far outskirts of Damascus and its countryside, and no one (...) can penetrate this line of defense that we, the armed forces, are erecting.", while in private he admitted to Mohammad Ghazi al-Jalali that the situation was not under control. The next day, Damascus fell to the rebel forces, and many members of the ruling junta fled the city.

== Sanctions ==
Owing to his involvement in the Syrian Civil War, al-Rahmoun has been subjected to sanctions by multiple countries. In 2017, he was added to the sanctions list of the United States Department of the Treasury. In 2019, he was sanctioned by the European Union and the United Kingdom, owing to his participation in the Syrian chemical weapons program and complicity in the Ghouta massacre. In 2019, he was the subject of travel bans issued by the governments of the United States, European Union countries, Canada, and Switzerland.

== See also ==
- Cabinet of Syria
- Law enforcement in Syria

Political offices
Preceded by Mohammad al-Shaar	Interior Minister; 2018	Incumbent
