= Law enforcement in Syria =

Law enforcement in Syria is primarily conducted by the Internal Security Forces under the Syrian transitional government.

The government is also training a new police force guided by Islamic teachings, and established a tourist police unit in May 2025.

In Ba'athist Syria, law enforcement was carried out by the Syrian Public Security Police, while internal security duties were carried out by several intelligence agencies. The Political Security Directorate was one of the agencies under the Ba’athist regime, under the guidance of the Ministry of Interior by the government. The Directorate was used for covert intelligence gathering and internal security issues within Syria. Syria has been an INTERPOL member since 1953. During the Syrian civil war, much of Syria was outside the control of the Ba’athist government, with the Asayish being responsible for policing in the Autonomous Administration of North and East Syria, the Turkish-backed "Free Syrian Police" in areas under the Turkish occupation of Northern Syria, and various Syrian opposition groups around Idlib.

Under the Ba'athist government, the Ministry of Interior controlled the state security forces. There were also other specialized organizations, such as the special metropolitan police in Damascus overseen by the Director General of the Public Security and Police, the Gendarmerie for control in rural areas and the Border Guard for border control especially the Syria-Iraq border.

The Internal Security Forces Day was on 29 May, the anniversary of French forces shelling the Parliament building in Damascus in 1945.

== History ==
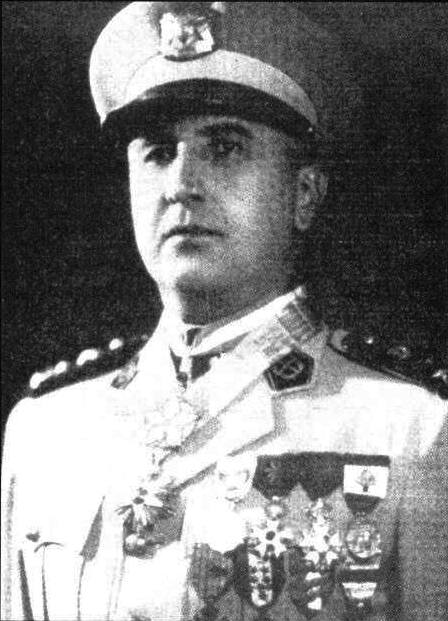
General Hrant Maloyan. He was essential in the establishment of the Syrian law enforcement system.

Police history in Syria dates back to the French Mandate, when General Pierre Rondot established a Gendarmerie in order to maintain law and order in rural areas; led by General Wahid Bey, it was poorly armed, organized, disciplined and equipped and did not prove very effective against rebel forces, despite several attempts to ameliorate at least discipline and morale.

=== From 1940s to 1950s: Independence and development ===
During the second half of 1944, France transferred most of the directorates of the Common Interests to the national governments, except the Levantine Special Forces and the police. To both the Lebanese and the Syrians, and to the Syrians in particular, the transfer of the army and police was of utmost importance; after several months of tense confrontation with the Syrian and Lebanese establishment, by July 1945 France had agreed to transfer control of the Levantine Special Forces. As with the Levantine Special Forces, French officers held the top posts in the security establishment, but as Syrian independence approached, the ranks below major were gradually filled by Syrian officers. By the end of 1945, the gendarmerie numbered some 3,500.

At the dawn of the independent era of the Syrian Republic, of around 15,000 troops under French control, some 5,000 would be converted into the Syrian Army of one brigade with auxiliary services; equal number would be taken into the Gendarmerie; half of remaining third would be needed for police and frontier customs control; remainder would be pensioned off. Several British officers were detailed as "training team" to assist the Syrian Gendarmerie.

Since independence, Syria's police and internal security apparatus have undergone repeated reorganization and personnel changes, reflecting the security demands of each succeeding regime. In 1945, Armenian general Hrant Maloyan was appointed by president Shukri al-Quwatli as the General Command of the Internal Security Forces in Syria and served this position until 1949. Maloyan would eventually be known to modernize the Syrian police ranks and improve discipline; members of the Gendarmerie doubled to 9,751 members by the time his post finished in 1949. On the wake of 1946, the Syrian Gendarmerie was considered the only reliable and effective support of the Government; it was purged and, once equipped by the United Kingdom with modern weaponry, it was successfully deployed to quell a revolt of Alawi religious leader Salman al-Murshid. In late 1940s, the national police force, grown out of the Gendarmerie, was deemed understaffed and poorly disciplined, with several cases of corruption among its ranks. Syrian President Shukri al-Quwatli favoured the Gendarmerie over the French-inherited Army, fearing the military might against his own patronage network.

While continuing discipline-improving efforts, in 1949 President Husni al-Za'im seized power and reformed the security apparatus, transferring the Gendarmerie from the Ministry of Interior to the Ministry of Defence; the director-general of police was Adib Shishakli, who in turn took the power in 1953. The reformed security apparatus cooperated with United States officials against drug trafficking in mid-1950s. As Syrian ruler, Shishakli retrained, reequipped, and expanded Syrian armed forces, police, and security services; the Director General of Police and Public Security was at the time Ibrahim al-Husseini.

Until early 1960s, the Syrian government sought the support also from former German officers for both the Army and the police forces: President of Syria Husni al-Za'im recruited military officers and police specialists. According to CIA records, two Nazi officials, Alois Brunner and Franz Rademacher, as soon as 1957 were granted asylum in Syria and advised Syrian police until the early next decade.

As of late 1950s, Syrian non-military internal security forces totalled about 5,000 personnel, including a National Gendarmérie of 2,800, a Desert Patrol of 400 and 1,800 uniformed police, under the authority of the Ministry of Interior. Both the gendarmérie and police were deployed in strategically important posts throughout the country. One desert patrol company was located in Central Syria and the other in Eastern Syria. The standard of training was deemed as being very low. In addition to the uniformed police, the police services included the Sûreté, a plain-clothes service of about 300 men. At the time, the United States Department of State deemed the non-military security forces to be unable to restrict the Communist action; nevertheless, due to the strength of political forces deemed as leftist (Communist and Ba'ath parties), the U.S. Department of State adopted a policy of avoiding to take actions aimed strengthen Syrian internal security forces.

=== 1960s: United Arab Republic and Ba'ath coups ===
Under the United Arab Republic, Syrian Minister of Interior Colonel Abdel Hamid al-Sarraj regained control over Syrian gendarmerie and the desert patrol; the Gendarmerie, the Desert Patrol and the Department of General Security (under military control) and the police (under the Ministry of Interior) were merged in the overall organization, called Police and Security, on 13 March 1958; the organization was placed under al-Sarraj's Ministry of Interior. Syrian police higher post were taken over by Egyptians even if three of the four intelligence networks operating in Syria were under Syrian direction; the other was attached to the President's Office in Cairo. In each Governorate, a Major General of Police was appointed to the influential position of Director of Security.

Back to the regained independence in 1961, Adnan Quwatli, a professor of Law linked to business community, was appointed Interior Minister; on 15 December 1961 Colonel Muhammad Hisham al-Samman was appointed Commander of Internal Security Forces, assisted by a Committee under his presidency and including the Directors-General of Police and Public Security and six provincial superintendents. The Kuzbari government pledged to establish political liberties and to disestablish emergency laws; despite this, the civil police forces are believed to have been used extensively to combat internal security threats to the government, including pro-Nasserites Baathists and other secular socialists (opposed to the business-Islamist alliance), especially in the universities, which were subjected to several forms of control; also trade unions were harshly confronted by the police in 1962.

=== Ba'athist Syria (1963–2024) ===
With the 1963 Syrian coup d'état, Amin al-Hafiz was appointed Ministry of Interior under Salah al-Bitar and Naji Jamil became the head of Military Police (until 1966), and in 1964 large-scale riots erupted in Hama, and in the late 1960s and early 1970s disturbances erupted over the secular constitution. With the Legislative Decree No. 67, issued on 24 March 1965, the police received the title of Internal Security Forces; according to the law the ISF were part of the armed forces, linked to the Minister of Interior, and specialized business and the tasks entrusted to them according to the regulations in force. The law granted the same status of the Syrian Arab Army and his men to the Internal Security Forces.

In 1966, as a result of the Syrian Regional Ba’ath Party's coup, Abd al-Karim al-Jundi assumed the leadership of the security apparatuses as head of the National Security Bureau of the Arab Socialist Ba'ath Party – Syria Region.

During the subsequent decades, however, police forces assumed a more conventional civil police role; this change in role coincided with increased professionalization and the parallel development of an effective and pervasive internal security apparatus. Nevertheless, the police continued to receive training in such functions as crowd and riot control.

==== From 1970s to 1980s: Islamist insurgency ====
During the relative political stability of the 1970s and 1980s, police and security services were credited with having grown and become professional; however, they remained highly secretive, and in 1987 only the bare outlines of their institutional makeup were known.

With the success of Hafez al-Assad'a Corrective Movement in November 1970, a partial reform of the law enforcement was carried out, with some crimes dealt with by the police instead of the Army; with the 1970s state building process, the local security chiefs gained more prominence, with the whole security apparatus being seen as the Regime «bedrock».

According to Alasdair Drysdale, the Hafiz al-Asad's rule was characterized by a marked increase of the Alawite presence in key posts in the officer corps, in the internal security forces and in the Ba'ath Party, possibly also due to the Islamist unrest. During the 1980s, the internal security apparatus was under the command of Rifaat al-Assad, brother of President Hafez al-Assad. During the unrest caused by the Muslim Brotherhood in 1976, the Internal Security Forces were heavily employed in the northern-central region, in Aleppo, Hama and Homs. During 1970s, Ali Haydar's Special Forces formed a key part of the Syrian government's security apparatus; they participated to the quelling of the Islamist uprising in Jisr al-Shughur in March 1980 and in Hama in February 1982.

According to John Andrade, in the mid-1980s the Public Security Police, a national police force, was responsible for routine police duties, although it was confronted by the insurgents in the 1982 Islamist uprising in Syria and held isolated skirmishes in Aleppo and in Latakia. Damascus had a metropolitan police force, which, like theprovincialforces, was subordinated to the national command. The Police was subdivided into four main services: Administration, Criminal Investigations, Public Order and Traffic departments which also dealt with internal security matters. The police system incorporated the 8,000-man Gendarmerie, which had originally been organized by the French Mandate authorities to police rural areas, and the 1800-man Desert Guard in charge for desert borders.

As of late 1980s, the internal security forces were given a high status: typically, provincial police chiefs were member of the relevant Ba'ath Party provincial command.

==== From 1990s to 2000s: Confrontation with Kurds and Islamists and reform of the security sector ====
Starting from the 1990s, the Syrian security sector underwent a series of reform, which were part, from mid-2000s, of a broader-range reform process. As of 2016, some 1993 estimates put the Gendarmerie as still being in force within the Internal Security Forces and being 8,000-men strong. In 1996 the Government of Syria reformed police and established the Anti-Narcotics Division. In 2002, Syria elevated the Anti-Narcotics unit from a branch to a separate Directorate of the Ministry of the Interior. The Economic Security Courts, established under the 1970 emergency laws and tasked with dealing with economic crimes, were disestablished in February 2004. In late 2000s, training programmes focusing on human rights were launched.

According to American professor Joshua Landis, the Internal Security Forces in mid-2000s altered their own ethnic/religious composition, under the guidance of then-Minister of Interior Ghazi Kanaan. This alteration was reportedly carried out in order to make the national police (subject to the law) reliable to step in dealing with national security issues, thus diminishing the extra-law Syrian intelligence community's role, as part of broader reforms of the same years. The decision reportedly caused criticism by Sunni Arab officials. Nevertheless, the police devoted to general duties was poorly equipped: according to the United Kingdom Home Office, as of 2009 there were few police checkpoints on main roads or in populated areas.

In mid-2000s Syrian police was involved in operations against Islamist militants, across the decade. Also the Military Police was involved in confrontations against Islamist militants detained in Syrian prisons. During the same period the Syrian police confronted also against Kurds and dealt with Kurdish demonstrations; clashes and shoot-outs were a not so uncommon occurrence throughout the decade.

In mid-2000s, the main agency was still known to the 2006 edition of the World Encyclopedia of Police Forces and Correctional Systems as the Syrian Public Security Police, operating under the Ministry of the Interior. Alongside the Public Security Police, whose headquarters maintained the subdivision into the four main branches, two paramilitary forces operated: the Gendarmerie and the Desert Guard. With regard to the ancillary law enforcement and security organizations, in 2003 Anthony Cordesman put the Gendarmes number at 8,000. On the other hand, according to Jane's Assessment, cited by 2012 U.K. Country of Origin Information report, as of 2006 the number of border guards deployed was increased to about 10,000.

On the international front, late 2000s were marked by an intensive cooperation with INTERPOL on terrorism issues.

==== From 2011 to 2024: Syrian civil war ====
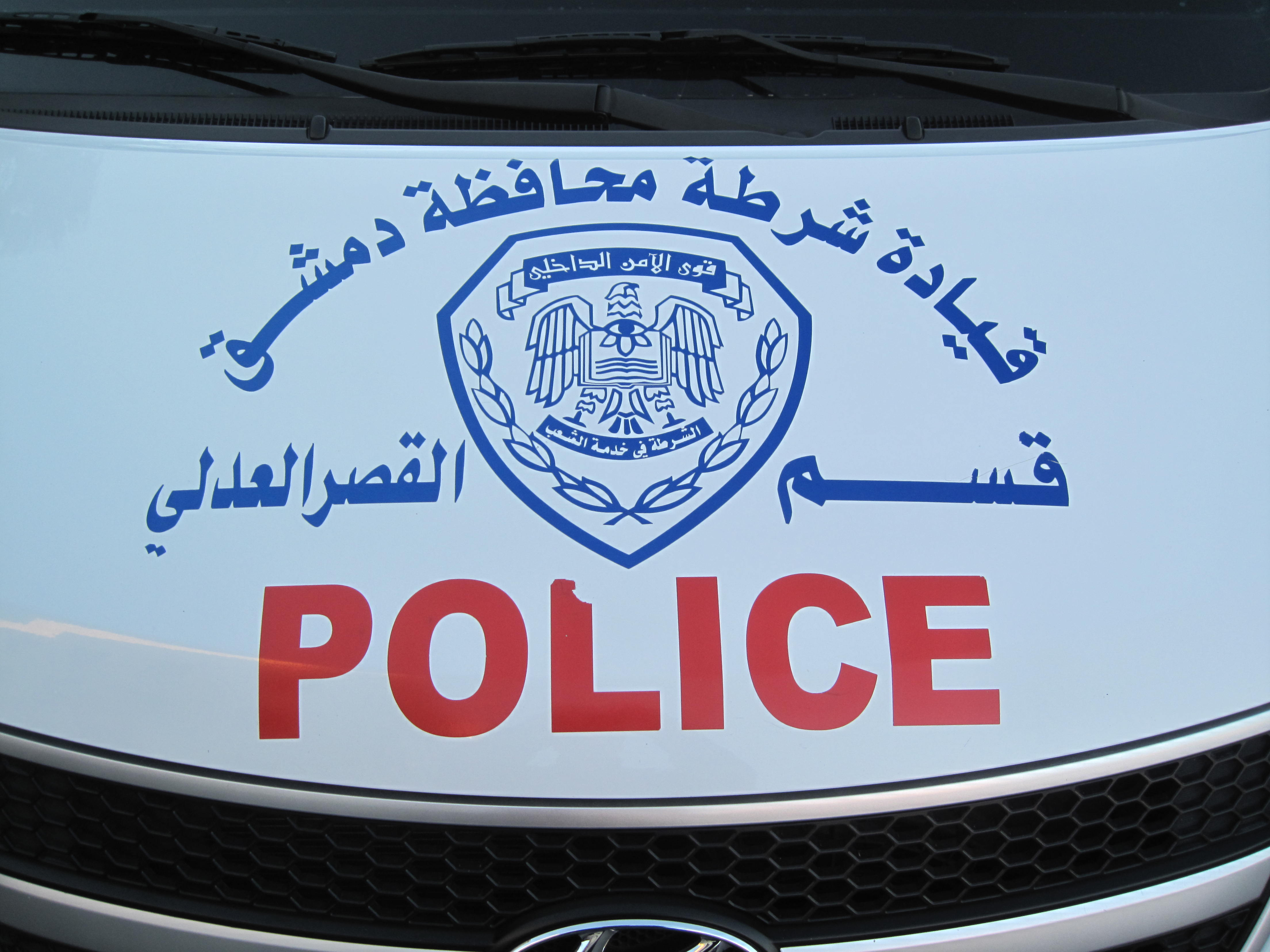
A Ba'athist Syrian police car bonnet, showing the official emblem.

At the outbreak of the Syrian civil war, the Syrian security apparatus appeared, to Middle East scholar Professor Joshua Landis, a cohesive group, without significant desertion problems; Syrian police was in charge of quelling demonstrations and they exercised violence against demonstrators; some sources claim that often the police violence was a reaction against violent opponents. According to government lists presented to and published by the UN's Independent International Commission of Inquiry on Syria, in 2011 the death toll for Syrian police forces was 478. According to U.S. government-funded Radio Farda, the Iranian police forces, along with Quds force units, supported the suppression of early protests in 2011. During the following phases of the Civil War, also regular police units were deployed on the front lines.

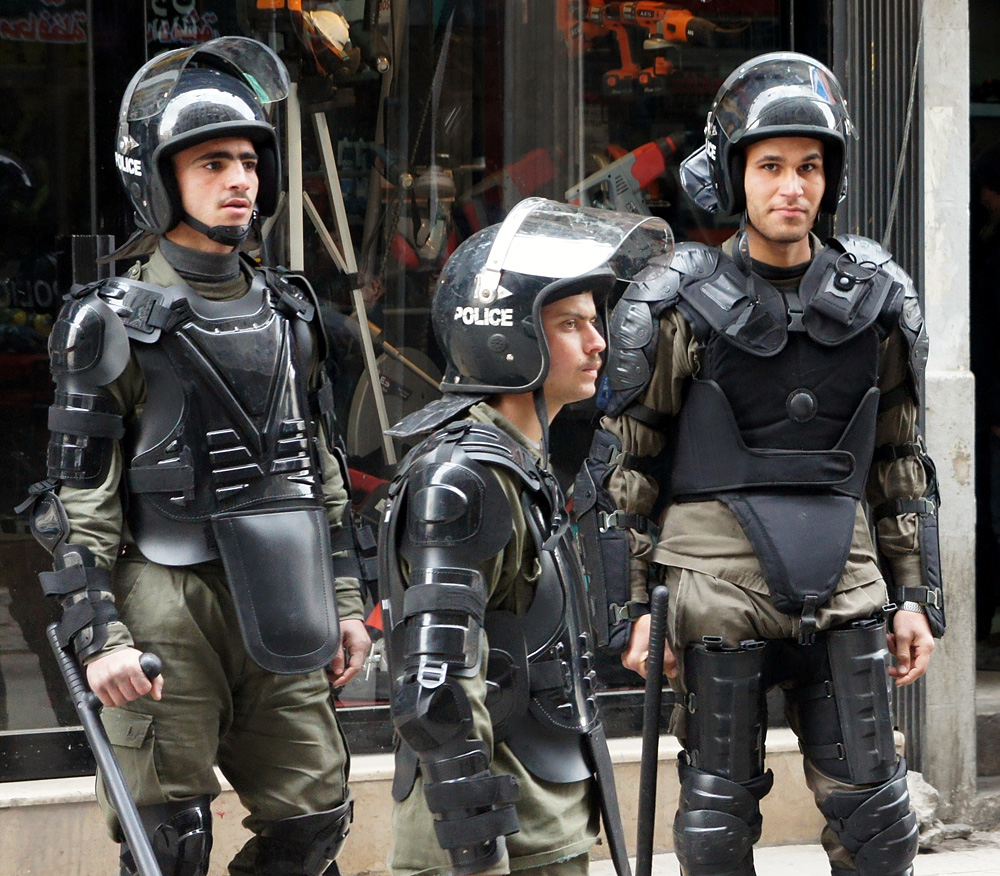
Ba'athist riot police in Damascus in 2012

According to Fars News Agency, in 2016 Iranian police commander, Brigadier General Hossein Ashtari, said that Iran was ready to offer support in police training.

Following the conquest of Aleppo by the Syrian Government, the Russian news agency Interfax reported that a Russian Military Police battalion arrived in Aleppo in order to support the law enforcement and to secure the peace commission.

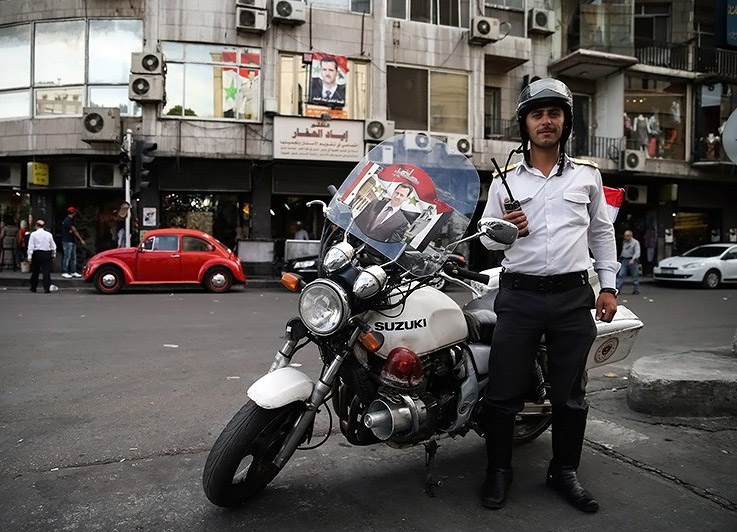
A traffic policeman in Damascus in 2014

As consequence of the establishment of the De-escalation zones, some Russian sources reported that the Russian Federation deployed four Military Police battalions in order to garrison such areas. The MP units form the core of specific units with specific non-combat control tasks, such as, according to Gulf News, the manning of checkpoints and observation posts.

In 2018, with the recovery of several areas by the Government, the Internal Security Forces were gradually redeployed in re-gained regions: Hama and Homs countryside, Damascus region. In particular, after the Syrian government assumed complete control of the Damascus region with the capture of the Yarmouk Camp in May 2018, the Internal Security Forces deployed in al-Hajar al-Aswad district and Yarmouk Camp and held a parade there alongside the Army.

Following the deepening of the civil war, police forces have been established also by insurgent factions, as well as by Rojava Kurdish-held region and, on 24 January 2017, a Syrian security force was established by Turkey in Turkey-controlled Syrian border town Jarablus; a video reportedly showing ranks and files of armed men chanting Islamist and pro-Turkey slogans was released on YouTube.

The ba'athist Ministry of Interior said that its tasks were limited to the protection and enforcement of security. Alongside with other Directorates, the Ministry of Interior controlled the Internal Security Forces, through the Criminal Security Directorate, which were organized into the six separate divisions of police forces under a Director General: Administrative Police (Public Order Police), Emergency Police, Traffic police (whose official Day was on 4 May), Criminal Investigations, Human Trafficking Department, Electronic Criminal Branch and Riot police, as well as a fanfare and the Khan al-Asal Police Academy. The Internal Security Forces were part of the Ministry of Interior but made use of military ranks.

Military courts had authority over cases involving soldiers or members of other military or police branches. If the charge against a soldier or member of the military or police branch iswas a misdemeanour, the sentence against the defendant was final. If the charge was a felony, the defendant had the right to appeal to the Military Chamber at the Court of Cassation. Military courts also had authority to try civilians in cases based on military law. Civilians had the right to appeal all sentences in military court. A military prosecutor decided the venue for a civilian defendant.

==== Ba'athist brutal force and other issues ====
The ba'athist law prohibited as torture and other cruel, inhuman, or degrading treatment or punishment, and the penal code provided punishment of a maximum imprisonment of three years for abusers. Under article 28 of the Syrian Constitution of 2012, "no one may be tortured physically or mentally or treated in a humiliating manner." Nevertheless, security forces reportedly continued to use torture frequently. Local human rights organizations continued to cite numerous credible cases of security forces allegedly abusing and torturing prisoners and detainees and claimed that many instances of abuse went unreported. Individuals who suffered torture or beatings while detained refused to allow their names or details of their cases to be reported for fear of government reprisal.

Former prisoners, detainees, and reputable local human rights groups reported that methods of torture and abuse included electrical shocks; pulling out fingernails; burning genitalia; forcing objects into the rectum; beatings while the victim was suspended from the ceiling and on the soles of the feet; alternately dousing victims with freezing water and beating them in extremely cold rooms; hyper-extending the spine; bending the body into the frame of a wheel and whipping exposed body parts; using a backward-bending chair to asphyxiate the victim or fracture the spine; and stripping prisoners naked for public view.

In previous years Amnesty International documented 38 types of torture and mistreatment used against detainees in the country. Amnesty reported that torture was most likely to occur while detainees were held at one of the many detention centres operated by the various security services in the country, particularly while authorities attempted to extract a confession or information. Courts systematically used "confessions" extracted under duress as evidence, and defendants' claims of torture were almost never investigated.

According to several sources, police impunity and corruption were serious problems during the Ba'athist era. In 2008, Bashar al-Assad issued a law that mandated that only the General Command of the Army and Armed Forces could issue an arrest warrant in the case of a crime committed by a military officer, member of the internal security forces, or customs police officer in the pursuit of his normal duties, and that such cases must be tried in military courts. Arbitrary and false arrests are also problems, and detainees had no legal redress. According to the accusations, the authorities use the Emergency Law to detain persons critical of the government and charge them with a wide range of political crimes, including treason. Incommunicado detention was a severe problem. Many persons who disappeared were believed to be either in long-term detention without charge or possibly to have died while detained. Many detainees brought to trial were held incommunicado for years, and their trials were often marked by irregularities and lack of due process. A shortage of available courts and lack of legal provisions for a speedy trial or plea bargaining led to lengthy pretrial detentions.

According to a 2005 Freedom House report, women were discouraged from presenting their claims in police stations, which were largely staffed by male police officers, for fear of experiencing discomfort or sexual harassment. According to the report, Syrian police officials were not sympathetic to women victims of violence.

A human rights police training program funded by the Swiss and Norwegian governments continued throughout 2008. The Geneva Institute for Human Rights, with support from the Ministand the Office of the High Commissioner for Human Rights, began a third training course in October.

== Syrian transitional government ==
After the fall of the Assad regime and subsequent dissolution of the Public Security Police, the Internal Security Command, whom were the police service in the Syrian Salvation Government, took over as the national police service of Syria except for areas controlled by the Syrian Democratic Forces.

=== Involvement in the 2025 massacre of Alawites ===
During the 2025 massacres of Syrian Alawites, members of the General Security Service were accused of taking part in the massacres against the Alawite population in Syria's coastal regions.

== Alternative police during the Syrian civil war ==
=== Asayish (2012–present) ===
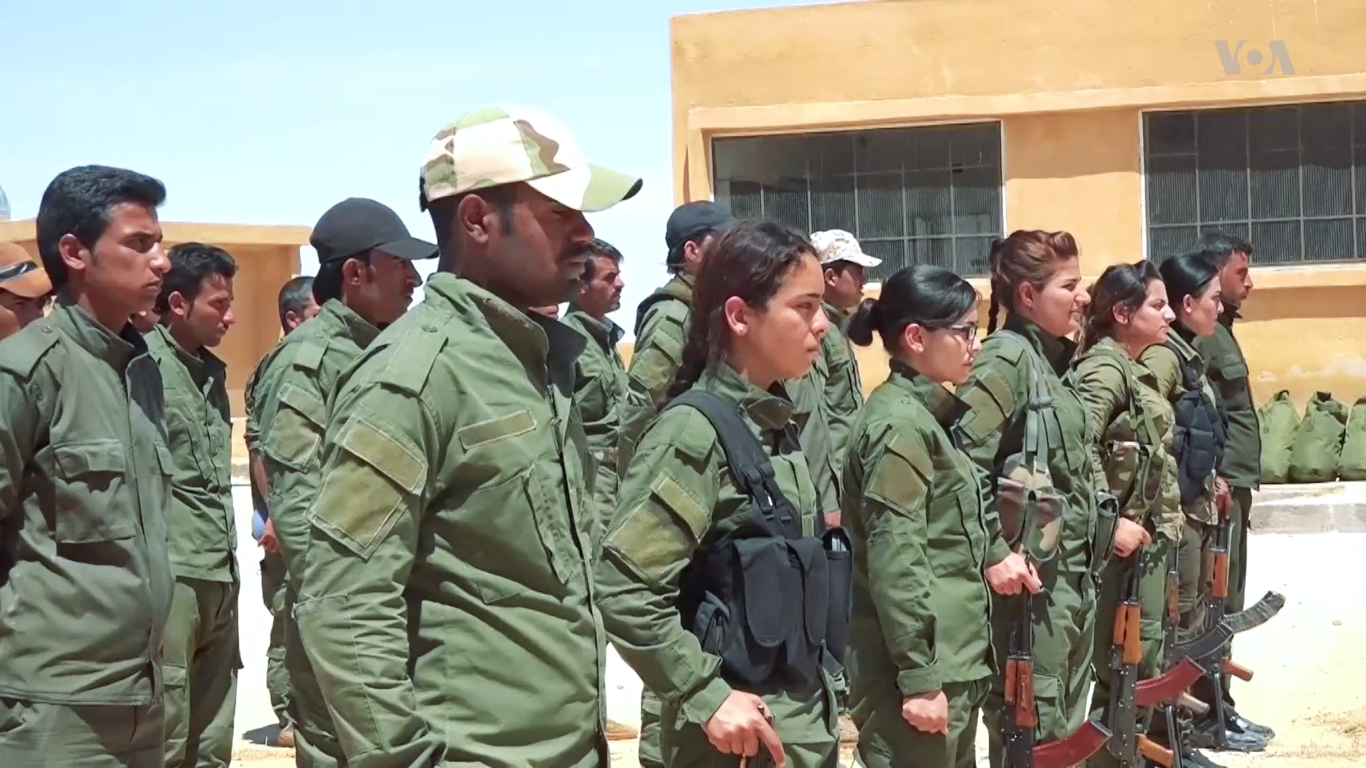
Members of the Asayish forces in Ayn Issa.

The Asayîş or Asayish (Arabic: الأسايش, Kurdish for security) is the official security organisation of the autonomous administration in the Democratic Autonomous Administration of North and East Syria (DAANES). It was formed during the Syrian civil war to police areas controlled by the Kurdish Supreme Committee.

On 17 May 2017, the Raqqa Internal Security Forces was established, with the support of the Self Defence Forces. The training has been provided by the international coalition against ISIS, with the first training course of 50 recruits based in Ayn Issa. The United States reportedly provided training to Raqqa security forces. The Manbij Internal Security Forces also operates as a police force.

The long-term goal for the group is to train 3,000 recruits; the initial batch is intended to develop in a training cadre in order to continue training Raqqa internal security forces recruits. According to Kurdistan 24, members of the Raqqa Internal Security Forces are mainly Arabs.

=== Free Syrian Police (2013–2019) ===
The Syrian National Coalition established in 2013 a Free Syrian Police in Aleppo. The FSP was said to be underequipped and underarmed; according to British foreign secretary Philip Hammond, the United Kingdom from 2014 to 2017 worked with international donors to provide the Free Syrian Police training, technical assistance, maintenance funds, and basic equipment. Most assistance was provided through the private contractor Adam Smith International. The UK-backed Free Syrian Police force reportedly operate unarmed.

According to pro-opposition sources, the label of "Free Syrian Police" does not imply an unified security organization; moreover, there is not a united judicial entity.

The rebel council directing police affairs which pro-opposition sources report is planned to be formed includes the chief for Aleppo police, a director of officers affairs, a director of inspections, regulation and administrative affairs, a director of immigration and crossings, a director of public relations and media and a representative for Idlib Governorate.

As of 2016, the Opposition factions have reportedly diminished the role of the Free Syrian Police in areas under their control; the Police has reportedly been limited to pursuing crimes and offences, directing traffic and other matters, excluding the Police from the security management.

According to Syrian Opposition website Zaman al-Wasl, Brigadier Adeeb al-Shalaf, chief of police in rebel-held areas of the Aleppo Governorate, announced in July 2017 the start of recruitment of women, in order to deal with the female inspection activities.

An investigation by the BBC program Panorama in 2017 found the Free Syrian Police to be involved in recurring human rights abuses, including executions by stoning, and collaboration with extremists such as the Nour al-Din al-Zenki Movement. After a suspension, British and other government funding resumed in early 2018. The resumption of funding without an independent investigation was decried by Kate Osamor, shadow secretary for international development, and other aid experts.

In June 2018 the British government decided, due to the changing military situation, to responsibly withdraw from funding some programmes in the area that the police operated in, such as education, livelihood support and policing. British government funding support for the Free Syrian Police ended in October 2018.

On 10 January 2019, following the Idlib inter-rebel conflict, the Free Idlib Police dissolved itself and handed over assets to local councils. With HTS taking over all of greater Idlib, the Free Syrian Police ceased to operate, with the only FSA area being with the SNA, which is policed by the Turkish created "Free Police". According to Abdullah Al-Jabassini for the European University Institute's Robert Schuman Centre for Advanced Studies, at least several members of the former Free Syrian Police joined the regular police.

==== Turkey-backed "Free Police" (2017–2025) ====
A Syrian security force was established by Turkey in Turkey-controlled Syrian border town Jarablus on 24 January 2017, in order to take control of the ordinary security of Euphrates Shield areas; a video reportedly showing ranks and files of armed men chanting Islamist and pro-Turkey slogans was released on YouTube. According to Reuters, the force is referred to as the "Free Police", in reference to the Free Syrian Army (FSA) alliance, and in January 2017 consisted of 450 recruits, many of whose are former Syrian rebel fighters, who received five weeks of training in Turkey; reportedly, the force is intended to grow up to 8,000 men.

As of 2017, the Turkey-backed "Free Police" is active in Azaz, Jarablus and al-Bab. According to the Syrian Opposition website Zaman Zaman al-Wasl, as of May 2017 the Turkey-backed "Free Police" in the border town of Azaz consisted of 1,600 officers. According to Zaman al-Wasl, the new police force replaced previous rebel police forces, with improvement in numbers and logistics. The Turkey-backed police reportedly lack highly ranked officers, as well as ranking criteria.

The Turkey-based security force consists of regular police and special forces; the commander is General Abd al-Razaq Aslan, a defector from the Syrian army.

Members of the Turkey-backed security force reportedly wear Turkish police uniforms decorated with the word "Polis" (Turkish for "Police") and Special Forces wear distinctive light blue berets, also worn by Turkish Gendarmerie. Some wore a Turkish flag patch on their uniforms at the inauguration ceremony on 24 January 2017. As of 25 October 2017, 5,600 Syrian police were trained by Turkey in Euphrates Shield area: Azaz, al-Bab and Jarabulus districts; in May 2018 they also assumed control of the Afrin area.

According to Danielle Fife for the Center for Security Policy, the Turkey-backed "Free Police" is part of the Turkish efforts to counter the Kurdish expansionism, along with the Turkish Free Syrian Army.

Following the Idlib inter-rebel conflict in January 2019, the Free Police became the only remaining FSA police force (as the Free Syrian Police ceased to operate).

=== ISIS police (2012–2017) ===
Between the end of 2012 and 2017, Islamic State (ISIS) maintained a local police force in parts of the Raqqa and Aleppo governorates that it controlled. According to Carl Anthony Wege, ISIS seemed to keep separate local police from religious police; the religious police has a mission of promoting virtue and preventing vice, called Hisbah which included a female unit. The Hisbah forces were organized at battalion-level under their own Emir.

Aside of Hisbah, al-Khansaa and Umm Rayhan brigades were internal security units maintaining their own morality police forces.

==== Ordinary police ====
The main official function of the ordinary police forces was to serve as the executive body for the court, but there were also road police services. Additionally, the police forces were tasked with maintaining internal security through the deployment of regular patrols inside towns. According to a well-known ISIL account, ISIL provided local police patrols with dedicated vehicles as well as branded khaki uniforms.

Despite ISIL claims that its officers "do not rule on any case, but rather transfer cases to the court," the reality is that extrajudicial detainment and torture are commonplace in ISIL-held territory. According to a report released by Amnesty International in December 2013, ISIL maintained at least seven large detention facilities throughout Raqqa and Aleppo provinces.

Inside its detention centers ISIL held common criminals who have been sentenced by its judicial branch, but it also detains political opponents, activists, and even children as young as eight years old. On 28 April 2014, an activist movement in Raqqa city publicized a protest by women demanding to know the fate of their male family members, who had been detained by ISIL for some time.

== See also ==
- Ministry of Interior (Syria)
- Human rights in Syria
- Khan al-Asal Police Academy
- Hrant Maloyan
