= Tourist Police (Malaysia) =

Law enforcement agency

- Unit Polis Pelancong
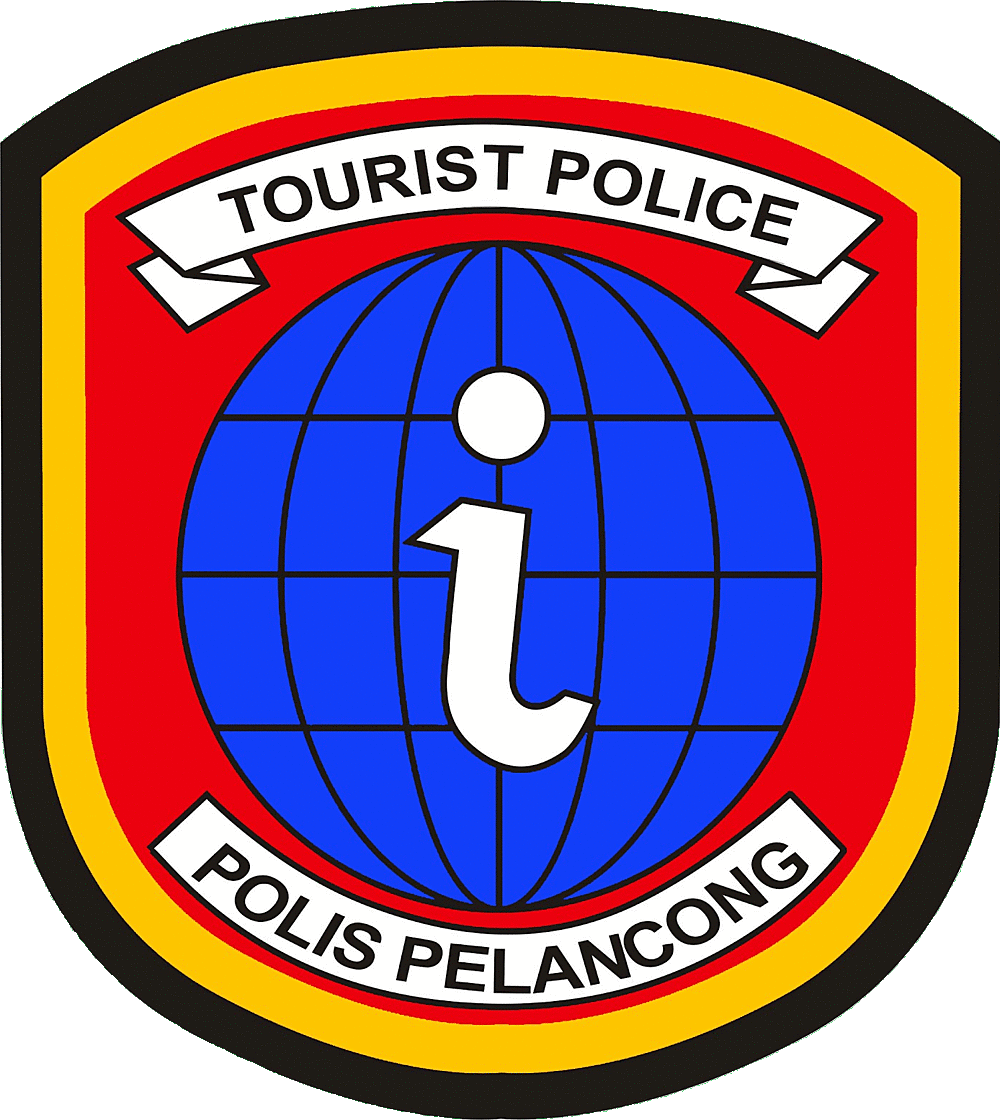
- The logo of Tourist Police
- Active: 1985–present
- Country: Malaysia
- Branch: Royal Malaysia Police
- Role: Law Enforcement
- Size: Classified
- Garrison/HQ: Bukit Aman Police HQ, Kuala Lumpur, and all Police Contingents
- Anniversaries: 25 March (Police Days Anniversaries), 31 August (Independence Day Anniversaries)

Commanders
- Inspector-General of Police: Razarudin Husain

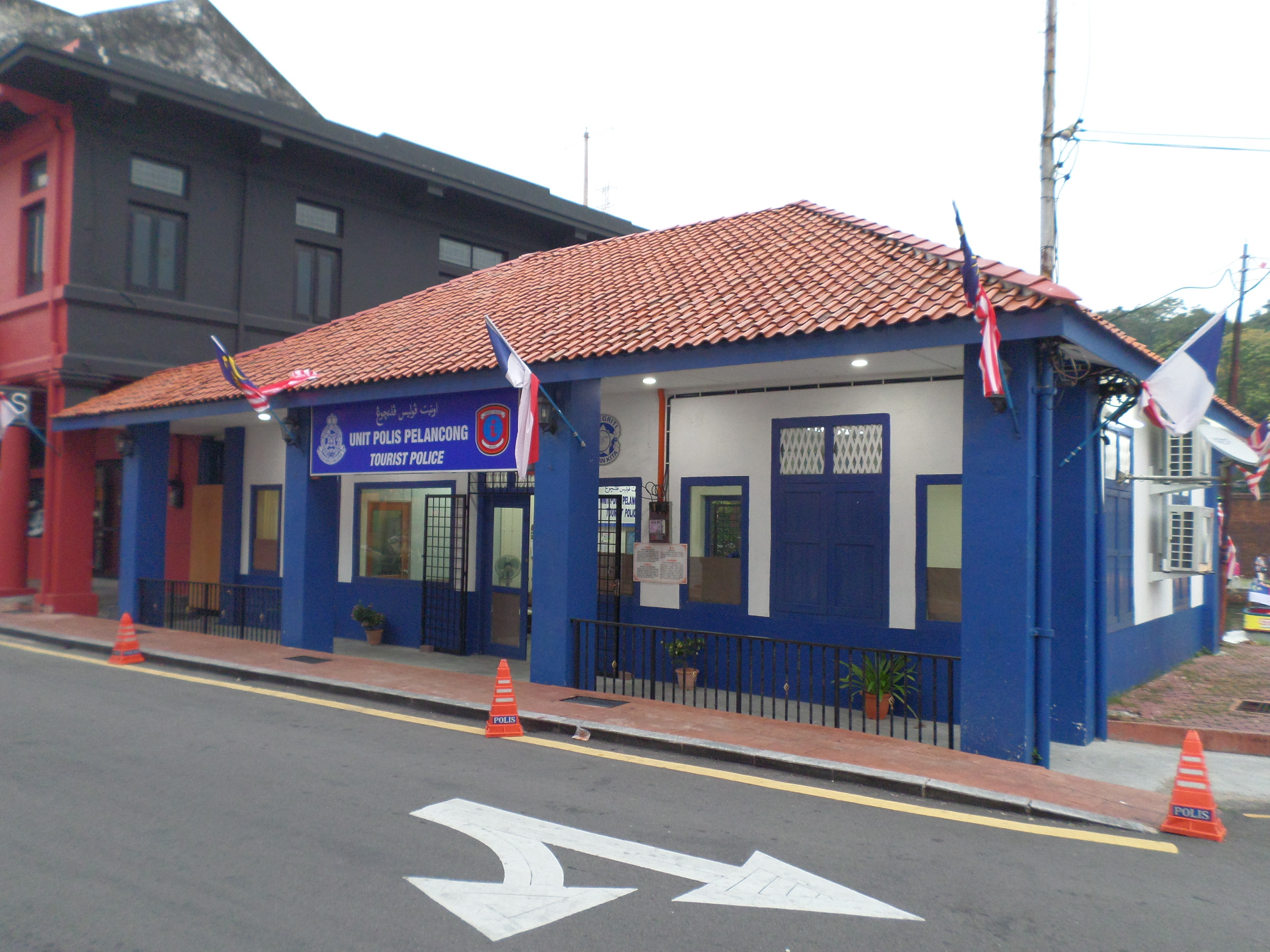
Tourist Police Unit in Malacca.

The Tourist Police Unit (Malay: Unit Polis Pelancong) is a specialised unit of the Royal Malaysian Police which provide tourist and visitors information on law, customs, culture and attractions in the local community. Tourist Police uniforms are dark blue with a white peaked cap. Badges worn on left pocket also feature an "i", symbolising the international code for "information".

== History ==
Tourist Police Unit in Malaysia were established by RMP in 1985 and is led by a commandant rank of Superintendent of Police. Tourist Police also help prevent crime in the areas which tourists visit.

== Organisations ==
In Kuala Lumpur, four teams have been established to do daily patrol and to prevent any crime incident among tourists and local community itself. The four patrol teams are:

- Walking Patrol
- Motorcycle Patrol
- Bicycle Patrol
- Patrol Car Crew

== Miscellaneous ==
In 2005, the state police of Malacca in co-operation with the Malacca City Historic Council (MBMB) established the "Tourist Police Mounted Unit" to maintain security and to aid tourists visiting the state.

Their motto is "Friendly, Fast and Right". As such, Tourist Police maintain contact with travel agencies, hotels, airlines, bus and taxi companies to help tourists find any information they may need. The Tourist Police help improve the country's image in the eyes of tourists.
