= Ministry of Interior (Syria) =

Government ministry of Syria

- وزارة الداخلية; Wizārat al-Dākhilīyah

Agency overview
- Formed: 1920; 106 years ago
- Jurisdiction: Government of Syria
- Headquarters: Kafr Sousa, Damascus
- Minister responsible: Anas Khattab
- Child agencies: Internal Security Forces; General Intelligence Service; General Authority of Borders and Customs; Criminal Investigations Department; Traffic Department; Drug Enforcement Department; Tourist Police Department; Immigration and Passport Directorate; Directorate of Airport and Border Security; Special Missions Department; Desert Security Forces
- Website: moi.gov.sy

The Ministry of Interior (Arabic: وزارة الداخلية, romanized: Wizārat al-Dākhilīyah) is a cabinet ministry of Syria, responsible for internal affairs. Its headquarters were located on Kafr Sousa in Damascus. According to the Ministry official website, its tasks are limited to the protection and enforcement of security.

The former headquarters of the Ministry of Interior was located at the Grand Serail which was established in 1900 near Marjeh Square. The building was transferred to the Ministry of Tourism in 2011 for use as a hotel.

== Organization ==
The Ministry of Interior is responsible for the administration of several law enforcement agencies in Syria, including:

- Internal Security Forces
- General Intelligence Service
- General Authority of Borders and Customs
- Criminal Investigations Department
- Traffic Department
- Drug Enforcement Department
- Tourist Police Department
- Immigration and Passport Directorate
- Directorate of Airport and Border Security
- Special Missions Department
- Desert Security Forces

== List of ministers of interior ==
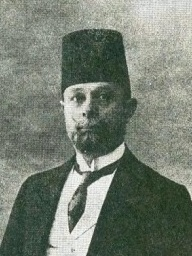
Rashid Talaa, first Minister of Interior of Syria

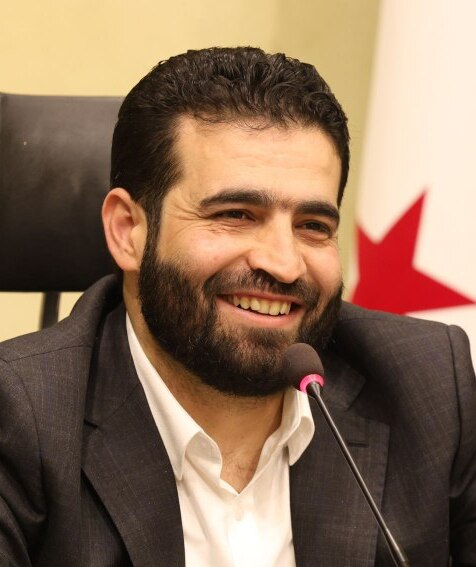
Anas Khattab, current Minister of Interior of Syria

Name	Took office	Left office	Notes
Rashid Talaa	30 September 1918	8 March 1920	
Reda Al Solh	9 March 1920	3 May 1920	1st tenure
Vacant (3 – 5 May 1920)
Reda Al Solh	5 May 1920	25 July 1920	2nd tenure
Ata Bey al-Ayyubi	25 July 1920	28 June 1922	1st tenure
Mustafa Nemat	28 June 1922	21 December 1924	
Nasri Bakhash	21 December 1924	21 December 1925	
Husni al-Barazi	4 May 1926	12 June 1926	1st tenure
Wathiq Moayad al-Azm	12 June 1926	2 December 1926	
Raouf Al Ayoubi	2 December 1926	8 February 1928	
Said Mahasin	15 February 1928	19 November 1931	
Badie Moayad al-Azm	19 November 1931	11 June 1932	Acting
Haqqi al-Azm	15 June 1932	17 March 1934	
Taj al-Din al-Hasani	17 May 1934	23 February 1936	
Ata Bey al-Ayyubi	23 February 1936	21 December 1936	2nd tenure
Saadallah al-Jabiri	21 December 1936	18 February 1939	
Nasuhi al-Bukhari	5 April 1939	8 July 1939	
Khalid al-Azm	3 April 1941	12 September 1941	
Husni al-Barazi	18 April 1942	8 January 1943	2nd tenure
Jamil al-Ulshi	8 January 1943	25 March 1943	
Ata Bey al-Ayyubi	25 March 1943	19 August 1943	3rd tenure
Lutfi al-Haffar	19 August 1943	14 October 1944	1st tenure
Fares al-Khoury	14 October 1944	14 March 1945	
Sabri al-Asali	14 March 1945	23 August 1945	1st tenure
Lutfi al-Haffar	26 August 1945	25 April 1946	2nd tenure
Sabri al-Asali	25 April 1946	27 December 1946	2nd tenure
Jamil Mardam Bey	28 December 1946	2 October 1947	
Muhsin al-Barazi	6 October 1947	19 August 1948	
Sabri al-Asali	23 August 1948	2 December 1948	3rd tenure
Adel al-Azma	16 December 1948	29 March 1949	
Husni al-Za'im	16 April 1949	26 June 1949	
Muhsin al-Barazi	26 June 1949	14 August 1949	
Rushdi al-Kikhya	14 August 1949	12 December 1949	
Ahmad Qanbar	24 December 1949	27 December 1949	1st tenure
Sami Kabbara	27 December 1949	4 June 1950	1st tenure
Rashad Barmada	4 June 1950	27 March 1951	1st tenure
Sami Kabbara	28 March 1951	8 August 1951	2nd tenure
Rashad Barmada	9 August 1951	28 November 1951	2nd tenure
Ahmad Qanbar	28 November 1951	1 December 1951	2nd tenure
Fawzi Selu	9 June 1952	11 July 1953	
Nuri al-Aybash	19 July 1953	1 March 1954	
Ali Bozo	1 March 1954	19 June 1954	1st tenure
Ismail Quly	19 June 1954	29 October 1954	
Ahmad Qanbar	29 October 1954	13 February 1955	3rd tenure
Sabri al-Asali	13 February 1955	13 September 1955	4th tenure
Abdul-Hasib Arslan	13 September 1955	14 September 1955	
Ali Bozo	14 September 1955	14 June 1956	2nd tenure
Ahmad Qanbar	14 June 1956	31 December 1957	4th tenure
Sabri al-Asali	31 December 1956	6 March 1958	5th tenure
Abdel Hamid al-Sarraj	6 March 1958	28 September 1961	
Adnan al-Quwatli	29 September 1961	20 November 1961	
Abdul-Salam al-Tarmanini	20 November 1961	22 December 1961	
Ahmad Qanbar	22 December 1961	27 March 1962	5th tenure
Abdel Halim Qaddur	16 April 1962	17 September 1962	
Aziz Abdul Karim	17 September 1962	8 March 1963	
Amin al-Hafiz	9 March 1963	4 August 1963	
Nureddin al-Atassi	4 August 1963	14 May 1964	
Mohamed Fahmy Achouri	14 May 1964	3 October 1964	
Abd al-Karim al-Jundi	3 October 1964	24 December 1964	
Mohammed Khair Badawi	24 December 1964	23 September 1965	
Mohammed Eid Achaoui	23 September 1965	27 December 1965	
Mohamed Fahmy Achouri	1 January 1966	23 February 1966	
Mohammed Eid Achaoui	1 March 1966	28 October 1968	
Mohammed Rabah Al-Tawil	28 October 1968	21 November 1970	
Abdul Rahman Khleifawi	21 November 1970	4 March 1971	
Ali Zaza	4 March 1971	8 July 1976	
Adnan Dabbagh	8 July 1976	14 January 1980	
Nasser al-Din Nasser	14 January 1980	8 April 1985	
Mohammad Ghobash	8 April 1985	11 January 1987	
Muhammad Harba	11 January 1987	12 December 2001	
Ali Hammoud	13 December 2001	7 October 2004	
Ghazi Kanaan	7 October 2004	12 October 2005	
Bassam Abdel Majeed	12 February 2006	23 April 2009	
Said Sammour	23 April 2009	14 April 2011	
Mohammad al-Shaar	14 April 2011	26 November 2018	
Mohammad Khaled al-Rahmoun	26 November 2018	8 December 2024	
Mohammad Abdul Rahman	10 December 2024	19 January 2025	
Ali Keda	19 January 2025	29 March 2025	
Anas Khattab	29 March 2025	Incumbent	

== See also ==
- Government of Syria
- Law enforcement in Syria
