= Hrant Maloyan =

Syrian-Armenian military serviceman (1896 – 1978)

- Հրանտ Մալոյան
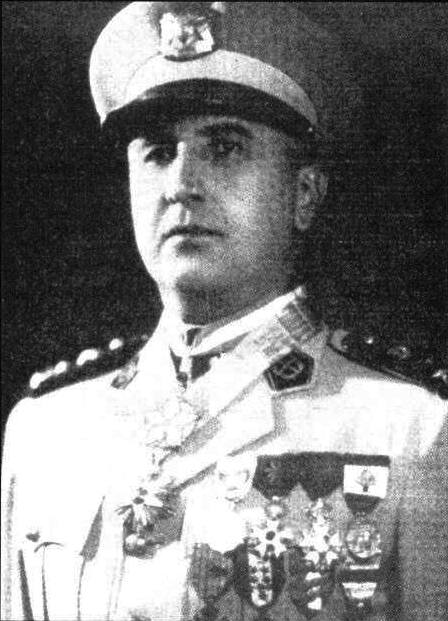
- Hrant Maloyan
- Born: 1896; Istanbul, Ottoman Empire
- Died: December 1, 1967 (aged 70–71)
- Military career
- Allegiance: Ottoman Empire (until 1918); French Mandate; Syrian Republic
- Branch: Syrian Army; Syrian Gendarmerie
- Rank: General
- Commands: General Commander of the Syrian Gendarmerie
- Conflicts: World War I; Franco-Syrian War; 1948 Arab–Israeli War

Hrant Maloyan (Armenian: Հրանդ Մալոյեան; 29 November 1896 – 1978), also known as Hrant Bek, was a Syrian-Armenian military serviceman who became the general officer of the Syrian army and was appointed General Command of the Internal Security Forces in Syria.

== Life and career ==
Hrant Maloyan was born in Istanbul on 29 November 1896 to an Armenian Catholic family. From 1905 to 1907, Maloyan received his education in Venice, Italy at the San Lazzaro degli Armeni. He then attended the Marist Brothers educational facility and graduated from there in 1912. After studying in a year at a Turkish school, he studied law at the Constantinople's College of Law from 1913 to 1914. He then attended the Ottoman Military Academy and graduated from there in 1916.

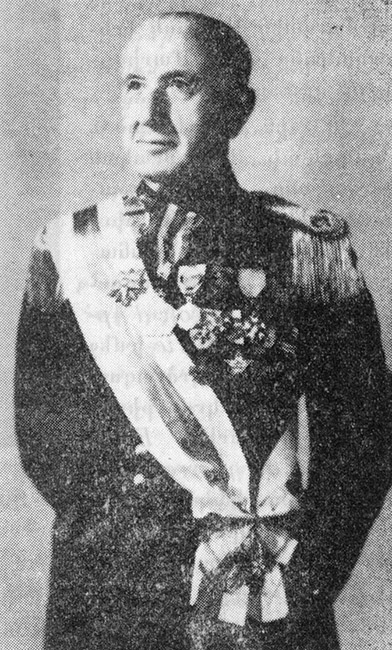
Hrant Maloyan

During World War I, Hrant Maloyan was conscripted to the Ottoman army and was sent to the Suez but was captured by British forces. In 1918, after being freed by the British, Maloyan went to Damascus and allied himself with King Faysal I. In 1920, he joined the French army and participated in the French Armenian Legion. Fluent in five languages, Maloyan was assigned as a translator, but was also assigned as a commander to the gendarmerie. Among the battles he participated were the battles of Marash and Amanos. Due to his relative success, Maloyan was appointed as a commissioned officer in 1922.

In 1945, he was appointed by president Shukri al-Quwatli as the General Command of the Internal Security Forces in Syria and served this position until 1949. His appointment was heralded by the Syrian press who demonstrated how accommodating Syrian society was towards its diverse population. It is also believed that this is the highest position an Armenian in Syria has ever held.

Maloyan would eventually be known to modernize the Syrian police ranks and improve discipline of the task force in the country. The members of the police task force doubled to 9,751 members by the time his post finished in 1949.

In 1946, Salman al-Murshid, a religious Syrian figure, was organizing a separatist movement. Maloyan had him arrested and ultimately tried and executed in November 1946.

During his time at the Head of Internal Security Forces, the Arab-Israeli war of 1948 began. Maloyan proclaimed martial law and set curfews. Meanwhile, he then restrained public disorder and prevented riots.

Having retired in August 1949, he worked for British Airways in Damascus. He then moved to the United States and settled in California, where he died in 1978. His funeral was attended by veteran soldiers, politicians, officers, and a large number of fans.

Hrant Maloyan has been decorated with medals from Syria, Lebanon, Egypt, and France.

== See also ==
- Armenians in Syria
- Aram Karamanoukian
