= Tourist Police Department (Syria) =

Law enforcement agency in Syria

Tourist Police Department إدارة شرطة السياحة
- Emblem of Syria

Agency overview
- Formed: 25 May 2025; 17 months ago

Jurisdictional structure
- Operations jurisdiction: Syria
- Governing body: Ministry of Interior
- General nature: Civilian police

Operational structure
- Agency executive: Mohannad Qarjoum, Director

The Tourist Police Department (Arabic: إدارة شرطة السياحة) is a law enforcement agency in Syria charged with protecting tourists and tourist areas. It is part of the Ministry of Interior. Announced in May 2025, the first batch of tourist police graduated from the Damascus police academy in June 2025 as part of a joint effort between the interior ministry and Ministry of Tourism. Its director is Mohannad Qarjoum.

In August 2025, 60 officers, including females, were deployed to the Damascus International Fair.

On November 30th 2025, the Syrian Arab News Agency published images of a new police vehicle design for the Tourist Police, showing the agency's new logo and emblem.
