= Damascus International Fair =

Annual commercial exhibition event

Damascus International Fair معرض دمشق الدولي
- Status: Active
- Genre: Fair, exhibition
- Frequency: Annually
- Venue: Damascus Fair Grounds
- Locations: Damascus, Syria
- Country: Syria
- Years active: 72
- Inaugurated: 1954
- Participants: 43 countries
- Website: seife.gov.sy

The Damascus International Fair is an annual commercial exhibition event, in Damascus, Syria. Described as "the Syrian economy's window to the world, the fair was first held in 1954 and is the oldest such fair in the Middle East. It was annually held in the Umayyad Square, but was cancelled in 2012 due to the Syrian Civil War before resuming again in 2017.

== History ==
The first fair was held during September 1954 and lasted for one month. The number of visitors exceeded 1,000,000 and 26 countries participated in the Fair, in addition to a various number of Syrian Industrial and commercial Enterprises. It covered a display area of 250,000 sqm.

== Events ==
The Fair was cancelled in 2012 because of the Syrian Civil War, but returned in 2017 for its 59th iteration after the 5-year hiatus.

In preparation for the return of the fair, a new fairground was opened spreading over 1.2 million sqm. It is located on the Highway between Damascus and the International Airport. The new fairground enjoys exhibition halls, services and facilities according to the most modern global standards, and is one of the biggest fairgrounds worldwide.

On 27 August 2025, Syrian President Ahmed al-Sharaa inaugurated the 62nd Damascus International Fair, the first to be held since the fall of the Assad regime. The event brought together around 850 local and international companies from 22 countries.

On 26 August 2026, the 63rd Damascus International Fair was inauguarated by President Ahmed al-Sharaa.
