= 2025 in Syria =

- Decades: 2000s; 2010s; 2020s
- See also: History of Syria; Timeline of Syrian history; List of years in Syria

Events in the year 2025 in Syria detail notable events that occurred in 2025.

Following the fall of the Assad regime in December 2024, Ahmed al-Sharaa continued to serve as the Syria’s de facto leader in early January and was appointed President during the Syrian Revolution Victory Conference held at the People's Palace. He officially began his term on 29 January 2025. The early phase of his presidency was marked by massacres targeting Syrian Alawites and clashes involving government-affiliated troops, which drew widespread criticism. He focused on consolidating power, rebuilding state institutions, integrating military factions, and restoring Syria’s international relations, including with the U.S., Russia, and regional powers. In March 2025, he signed an interim constitution that established a five-year transition period and defined Syria as a presidential system, with executive power vested in the president, and announced the formation of a transitional government.

This year also saw ongoing conflicts between the current Syrian government and Assad loyalists (mainly Alawites) and Druze insurgents, between the ex-Syrian National Army and the Syrian government with the Kurdish-led Syrian Democratic Forces, as well as an Israeli invasion that has continued since Assad’s fall. In September 2025, al-Sharaa addressed the general debate of the 80th session of the United Nations General Assembly, becoming the first Syrian leader to do so since Nureddin al-Atassi in 1967. In October 2025, a parliamentary election was held under the authority of the Syrian transitional government, the first since the fall of the Assad regime. The Syrian government actively engaged with the European Union and neighboring countries, including Turkey and Arab states, in post-war reconstruction efforts. By 2025, the Syrian civil war had left the country’s economy in poor condition after years of international sanctions, which had later been eased.

In December, The Economist reported that Syria was named Country of the Year for 2025.

== Incumbents ==
=== Central government ===
Office	Image	Name	Assumed office / Current length
De facto Leader of Syria (Note: Emblem used de facto by the Syrian caretaker government between December 2024 and January 2025.)		Ahmed al-Sharaa	8 December 2024 – 29 January 2025 (Appointed President of Syria by the Syrian General Command on 29 January 2025)
President of the Syrian Arab Republic (Note: Emblem used de facto by the Syrian presidency from January to July 2025, when Syria adopted a new emblem.) President of the Syrian Arab Republic (Note: A new emblem was adopted in July 2025 and has been used by the Syrian presidency since then.)		Ahmed al-Sharaa	29 January 2025 (19 months ago)
Prime Minister of Syria (Note: The Prime Minister of Syria briefly served as the head of the Syrian caretaker government until the position was abolished following the establishment of the Syrian transitional government in March 2025.)		Mohammed al-Bashir	10 December 2024 – 29 March 2025 (Position abolished on 29 March 2025)

=== Governorates ===
Governors

==== Governors ====
- Damascus Governorate: Maher Marwan
- Rif Dimashq Governorate: Amer al-Sheikh
- Aleppo Governorate: Azzam al-Gharib
- Idlib Governorate: Mohammed Abdul Rahman
- Hama Governorate: Abdul Rahman al-Sahyan
- Homs Governorate: Abdul Rahman al-Aama
- Latakia Governorate: Mohammad Othman
- Tartus Governorate: Ahmad al-Shami
- Daraa Governorate: Anwar al-Zoubi
- Quneitra Governorate: Ahmed al-Dalati
- Suwayda Governorate: Mustafa al-Bakour
- Deir ez-Zor Governorate: Ghassan al-Sayyed Ahmed
- Raqqa Governorate: Vacant (Note: The Syrian transitional government had not appointed a governor for Raqqa by the end of 2025, as most of the governorate remained under the control of the Democratic Autonomous Administration of North and East Syria (DAANES).)
- Hasakah Governorate: Vacant (Note: The Syrian transitional government had not appointed a governor for Hasakah by the end of 2025, as most of the governorate remained under the control of the Democratic Autonomous Administration of North and East Syria (DAANES).)

== Events ==
For events related to the civil war, see Timeline of the Syrian civil war (2025)

=== January ===
- 7 January – International flights resume from Damascus International Airport for the first time since the fall of the Assad regime.
- 15 January – Three people are killed in an Israeli strike on Ghadir al-Bustan, Quneitra Governorate.
- 16 January – Spain reopens its embassy in Damascus after a 13-year closure caused by the Syrian civil war.
- 20 January – A French court issues an arrest warrant against former president Bashar al-Assad for the 2017 killing of a dual French-Syrian national in a bombing in Deraa.
- 21 January –
  - Syrian authorities restore control over the port of Tartus, abrogating a 2019 agreement that granted a 49-year contract for the Russian firm Stroytransgaz to operate it.
  - The Syrian caretaker government revokes a 2017 agreement that granted a 49-year lease for the Russian Navy to operate the Tartus naval base.
- 23 January – The Russian spy vessel Kidin is reported to have caught fire off the Syrian coast.
- 29 January –
  - At the Syrian Revolution Victory Conference, the Syrian General Command formally appointed Ahmed al-Sharaa as President of Syria for the transitional period.
- 31 January – The US military says it had killed Muhammad Salah al-Zabir, a senior operative of the al-Qaeda affiliate Hurras al-Din in an airstrike near Batabo in northwestern Syria.

=== February ===
- 1 February – Four people are killed in a car bombing in Manbij.
- 3 February – Twenty people are killed in a car bombing in Manbij.
- 4 February – Mohammad al-Shaar, a former interior minister under the Assad regime, surrenders to the transitional authorities.
- 15 February – The US military says it had killed a senior finance and logistics official of the al-Qaeda affiliate Hurras al-Din in an airstrike in northwestern Syria.
- 20 February – Seven people are killed in an explosion caused by unexploded ordnance stored inside a house in Al-Nayrab.
- 23 February – Israeli Prime Minister Benjamin Netanyahu states that Israel will prevent Syria’s new army or HTS from advancing south of Damascus, citing protection of the Druze minority.
- 24 February –
  - The European Union suspends sanctions against Syria targeting its energy and transport sectors as part of efforts to encourage political reform.
  - The Syrian National Dialogue Conference begins in Damascus as part of political transition efforts.
- 25 February – The Israel Defense Forces launch airstrikes on military installations outside Damascus and in Daraa Governorate, killing at least two people.

=== March ===
- 6 March –
  - Thirteen police officers are killed in an ambush by Assad loyalists in Jableh, near Latakia.
  - The United Kingdom lifts sanctions on 24 Syrian financial entities, including the Central Bank of Syria.
- 9 March – March 2025 Western Syria clashes: Over 1,300 people are killed over the course of 72 hours amid ongoing clashes between the caretaker government and pro-Assad forces. At least 973 Alawites, Christians, and civilians of other religious minorities are killed in reprisal massacres by alleged caretaker government-associated armed forces.
- 10 March – The Syrian Democratic Forces (SDF) sign an agreement to integrate its soldiers and institutions into the caretaker government.
- 12 March – The caretaker government announces the formation of a National Security Council to be chaired by President al-Sharaa.
- 13 March –
  - The IDF carries out an airstrike in Damascus, killing one person.
  - President al-Sharaa ratifies an interim constitution valid for five years.
- 15 March – Sixteen people are killed in an explosion caused by the mishandling of unexploded ordnance by a scrap dealer inside a residential building in Latakia.
- 16 March – Ten people are killed in clashes along the Syrian-Lebanese border following the killing of three Syrian soldiers blamed by Damascus on Hezbollah.
- 17 March – The IDF carries out an airstrike in Daraa, killing three people.
- 20 March – Germany reopens its embassy in Damascus after a 13-year closure caused by the Syrian civil war.
- 25 March – Five people are killed by IDF shelling in Kuwayya, Daraa Governorate.
- 27 March – Maysaa Sabreen resigns from her post as governor of the Central Bank of Syria, three months into her mandate, and Abdulkader Husrieh is appointed to succeed her.
- 29 March – The Syrian transitional government is announced by President al-Sharaa at a ceremony at the Presidential Palace in Damascus. The government replaces the Syrian caretaker government, which was formed following the fall of the Assad regime.
- 31 March – Four people are killed in an attack by unidentified gunmen on the village of Haref Nemra outside Baniyas.

=== April ===
- 3 April – At least 13 people are killed in a series of airstrikes and ground attacks by the IDF across Syria.
- 4 April – The SDF withdraws from the Sheikh Maqsood and Ashrafieh neighborhoods of Aleppo as part of an agreement with the transitional government.
- 10 April – Syria and South Korea establish diplomatic relations for the first time.
- 12 April – The SDF withdraws from the Tishrin Dam as part of an agreement with the transitional government.
- 18 April – U.S. Congressmen Cory Mills and Marlin Stutzman visit Syria to meet with government officials and religious leaders.
- 24 April –
  - The United Kingdom lifts sanctions on 12 Syrian government agencies, including the defence and interior ministries and the General Intelligence Directorate.
  - Essam al-Buwaydhani, the leader of the former rebel group Jaysh al-Islam, is arrested in the United Arab Emirates.
- 27 April – The Qatari and Saudi Arabian finance ministries announce in a joint statement that they will pay off Syria's $15 million debt to the World Bank, which is finalized on 16 May.
- 29 April – At least 14 people are killed in sectarian clashes caused by an audio recording criticizing the Prophet Muhammad in the majority-Druze town of Jaramana.
- 30 April – At least 11 people are killed in sectarian clashes involving members of the Druze community in Sahnaya. Israel subsequently launches an attack on the area, saying that it targeted those involved in attacks against the Druze.

=== May ===
- 2 May – Israel carries out an airstrike near the Presidential Palace in Damascus.
- 3 May – Talal Naji, the Syria-based head of the Popular Front for the Liberation of Palestine-General Command (PFLP-GC), is detained near his residence in Damascus.
- 13 May – US president Donald Trump announces that the United States will plan to lift sanctions on Syria.
- 14 May – President Trump meets with President al-Sharaa in Saudi Arabia, marking the first meeting between American and Syrian heads of state since Bill Clinton and Hafez al-Assad convened in Geneva in 2000.
- 17 May – The transitional government announces the formation of the National Commissions for Missing Persons and Transitional Justice.
- 20 May –
  - The European Union announces the conditional lifting of sanctions against Syria on humanitarian grounds, with the exception of sanctions placed on grounds of security and human rights issues.
  - Two soldiers of unspecified nationality are killed in an attack by militants on the Russian-operated Khmeimim Air Base that also leaves the two perpetrators dead.
- 22 May – Islamic State claims its first attack on Syrian government forces since the fall of the Assad regime, saying that it had killed or injured seven soldiers in a bomb attack in Al-Safa, Suwayda Governorate.

=== June ===
- 2 June –
  - The Damascus Securities Exchange opens for the first time since the fall of the Assad regime.
  - The transitional government and the SDF conduct a prisoner exchange that sees the release of 470 people in Aleppo.
- 3 June – Israel launches airstrikes on Daraa Governorate in response to rocket attacks on the Golan Heights.
- 7 June – The government announces the closure of the Rukban refugee camp.
- 9 June – The government imposes a conservative dress code for women on public beaches.
- 12 June – One person is killed while seven others are captured in an Israeli raid on Beit Jinn to find Hamas militants.
- 16 June – A court in Germany convicts Syrian doctor Alaa Mousa for crimes against humanity regarding the torture of dissidents in Assad regime-controlled military hospitals in Damascus and Homs during the Syrian Civil War.
- 21 June – The government announces the arrest of Wassim Badi al-Assad, one of Bashar al-Assad's cousins, on charges including war crimes and drug trafficking.
- 22 June – At least 25 people are killed in a suicide bombing during a Sunday service at the Greek Orthodox Church of the Prophet Elias in Damascus that is blamed on Islamic State and claimed by Saraya Ansar al-Sunnah.
- 30 June – US President Donald Trump issues an executive order lifting sanctions imposed by the United States against Syria except those linked to the Assad family and their associates and related institutions.

The Syrian transitional government unveiled Syria's new emblem, featuring a gold-coloured eagle facing right, with three five-pointed stars arranged in an arc above its head.

=== July ===
- 3 July –
  - The government unveils the new emblem of Syria, featuring a gold-coloured eagle, facing to its right, with three five-pointed stars arranged in an arc above its head.
  - A forest fire breaks out near the Turkish border in Latakia Governorate, prompting multiple evacuations in Qastal Ma'af.
- 5 July – Syria and the United Kingdom re-establish diplomatic relations following UK Foreign Secretary David Lammy’s visit to Damascus.
- 7 July – The United States revokes the foreign terrorist organization designation for al-Nusra Front, also known as Hay'at Tahrir al-Sham (HTS).
- 10 July –
  - Rami Al Ali becomes the first Syrian to have their work exhibited at Paris Fashion Week.
  - President al-Sharaa issues a presidential decree establishing the “Development Fund” as an economic institution to support reconstruction and appoints Mohammed Safwat Abdul Hamid Raslan as its Director General.
  - President al-Sharaa issued a presidential decree forming the Supreme Council for Economic Development, tasked with promoting economic stability in Syria and driving its revitalization and growth.
- 13 July –
  - Southern Syria clashes: At least 60 people are killed in clashes between Sunni Bedouins and Druze in Suwayda.
  - The General Authority for Land and Sea Ports signs an agreement with the UAE-based firm DP World valued at $800 million to redevelop the port of Tartus.
- 15 July – Southern Syria clashes: Defense Minister Murhaf Abu Qasra announce a ceasefire effective after an agreement with the Druze leaders in Suwayda. Following the announcement, the IDF conducts intensive airstrikes across Suwayda targeting equipment and convoys of the Syrian armed forces.
- 16 July –
  - Israel launches airstrikes on the Ministry of Defense building in Damascus.
  - The Syrian army withdraws from Suwayda following calls from the United States for their departure.
- 18 July – A ceasefire to end the Southern Syria clashes collapses following renewed fighting between Bedouins and Druze in Suwayda.
- 19 July – President al-Sharaa announces another ceasefire to end the Southern Syria clashes.
- 24 July –
  - At least seven people are killed in an explosion at an ammunition dump in Maarrat Misrin, Idlib Governorate.
  - Syria announces 47 investment agreements with Saudi Arabia valued at more than $6 billion.
- 25 July –
  - The French Court of Cassation annuls an arrest warrant issued by France in 2023 against then-president Bashar al-Assad over the 2013 Ghouta chemical attack, citing presidential immunity.
  - Dhiya Zawba Muslih al-Hardan, a senior Islamic State leader, is killed along with two of his sons in a joint raid carried out by US-led forces, the General Security Service and the SDF in al-Bab, Aleppo Governorate.

=== August ===
- 1 August – The government announces the formation of a fact-finding committee to investigate July’s Sweida violence.
- 2 August –
  - Turkey opens a pipeline to facilitate the distribution of natural gas from Azerbaijan to Syria.
  - The interim government and the SDF accuse each other of launching a rocket attack on a military position in Manbij that injures seven people.
- 3 August – At least one person is killed in renewed clashes between Druze militias and government forces in Suwayda Governorate.
- 4 August – Clashes break out between the SDF and armed groups associated with the government in Dayr Hafir, Aleppo Governorate.
- 6 August – The government signs investment agreements with international investors valued at $14 billion, including for the expansion of Damascus International Airport and the construction of a subway system in Damascus.
- 12 August – A government soldier is killed during clashes with the SDF in Aleppo Governorate.
- 14 August – A petition is submitted to Syria’s interior ministry by foreign fighters and other foreigners seeking Syrian citizenship, led by U.S.-born journalist Bilal Abdul Kareem.
- 16 August –
  - An explosive device planted in a car detonates near the Mazzeh area of Damascus; no casualties are reported.
  - Hundreds of Druze protest in Sweida, Shahba, and Salkhad, demanding self-determination and rejecting the interim central government.
- 17 August – A suicide bomber detonates an explosive belt in Aleppo’s al-Maysar neighbourhood, near a bakery. The attacker is killed, but no other casualties are reported.
- 20 August – Salah Numan aka Ali, a senior Islamic State leader from Iraq, is reported killed in an airstrike by US Coalition forces in Atme, Idlib Governorate.
- 25 August – The government accuses Israel of sending 60 soldiers to seize Syrian territory in the Mount Hermon area.
- 26 August – Eight soldiers are killed in Israeli drone strikes in Al-Kiswah, Rif Dimashq Governorate.
- 29 August – President al-Sharaa issues a presidential decree establishing the Higher Council for Education and Upbringing, which includes the President of the Syrian Arab Republic or a delegated representative as Chairman, along with several ministers as members.

=== September ===
- 2 September –
  - The International Atomic Energy Agency says it found traces of uranium of anthropogenic origin at an undeclared nuclear reactor in Deir ez-Zor Governorate that was attacked by Israel in 2007 and linked to the Assad regime's clandestine nuclear program.
  - A court in France issues an arrest warrant for Bashar al-Assad and six other officials of his regime over the bombing of a press centre in Homs that killed journalists Marie Colvin and Remi Ochlik during the Syrian civil war in 2012.
  - A mass escape attempt involving 56 residents of the Al-Hawl refugee camp is thwarted by Kurdish authorities.
- 2 September – A bus and a fuel tanker collide in Al-Hasakah, killing 12 people and injuring another.
- 5 September – The government launches the Syrian Development Fund as part of reconstruction efforts following the Syrian Civil War.
- 9 September – Israel carries out airstrikes in Homs and Latakia.
- 19 September – Omar Abdul-Qader aka Abdul-Rahman al-Halabi, an Iraqi national suspected of being the head of foreign operations of Islamic State, is killed in a raid by US-led coalition forces in Hama Governorate.
- 24 September –
  - President al-Sharaa addresses the general debate of the 80th session of the United Nations General Assembly, becoming the first Syrian leader to do so since Nureddin al-Atassi in 1967.
  - Ukraine and Syria formally reestablish diplomatic relations that had been severed following the Assad regime's decision to recognize the independence of the Donetsk and Luhansk People's Republics in June 2022.

=== October ===
- 1 October – Two workers are killed, several are injured, and others are reported missing when the ceiling of an under-renovation grand serail in Damascus collapses.
- 5 October – 2025 Syrian parliamentary election.
- 6 October – One person is killed in clashes between the SDF and government forces in Aleppo.
- 15 October – President al-Sharaa meets with Russian President Vladimir Putin in Moscow as part of al-Sharaa's first official visit since the fall of the Assad regime.
- 16 October – Four security personnel working for the Ministry of Energy are killed in a bomb attack on their bus in Deir ez-Zor Governorate.
- 21 October – Three members of the Druze community are killed in a gun attack near Kafr Maris, Idlib Governorate.
- 29 October – Syria officially recognizes Kosovo as an independent state.

=== November ===
- 6 November – The United Nations Security Council votes with 14 in favor and China abstaining to lift sanctions against president al-Sharaa and interior minister Anas Khattab that were imposed during their time as leaders of HTS.
- 9 November – Six marble statues from the Roman era are stolen following a heist at the National Museum of Damascus.
- 10 November – Syria formally joins the US-led coalition against the Islamic State.
- 13 November –
  - Syria reopens its embassy in the United Kingdom for the first time since 2012.
  - Clashes break out between government forces and the Druze National Guard in Al-Majdal, Suwayda.
- 14 November – A Katyusha rocket attack on the Mezzeh 86 neighborhood of Damascus causes damages and injuries.
- 15 November –
  - Four people are killed, including the mayor of Wady al-Mawla, and another is severely injured in a mass shooting by unidentified gunmen at a coffeehouse in Talkalakh, Homs Governorate.
  - Three people are injured, including two critically, in a drive-by shooting in Abu Jarin, Aleppo Governorate.
- 23 November – A Bedouin couple belonging to the Bani Khalid tribe are killed in Zaidal, Homs Governorate, triggering an attack by tribe members on an Alawite-neighborhood in Homs city.
- 26 November – Five people are killed in an explosion at an arms depot in Kafr Takharim, Idlib Governorate.
- 28 November – At least 13 people are killed in an Israeli raid on Beit Jinn.

=== December ===
- 4 December — A delegation from the United Nations Security Council visits Syria for the first time since its founding in 1945.
- 5 December – Canada removes Syria from its list of countries that support "terrorism" and revokes its designation of HTS as a "terrorist" organization, citing similar decisions by western governments and efforts by the transitional government to restore stability.
- 12 December – The Jewish Heritage in Syria Foundation becomes the first Jewish organization to be registered in Syria.
- 13 December – Two American soldiers and a civilian interpreter are fatally shot by a gunman who is later killed during a joint patrol by domestic and US security forces near Palmyra.
- 14 December – A mass shooting in Idlib kills four members of the security forces and injures another on a patrol.
- 16 December – US President Donald Trump issues a proclamation barring Syrian nationals from entering the United States.
- 18 December – The US lifts its remaining sanctions on Syria imposed during the Assad regime.
- 19 December – The US launches strikes against more than 70 Islamic State targets in Syria, killing at least five militants.
- 22 December – Three people are killed in the Aleppo clashes between government forces and the SDF in Aleppo.
- 24 December –
  - The Jordanian Armed Forces carry out airstrikes against drug and weapons traffickers in Suwayda Governorate.
  - Authorities announce the arrest of Taha al-Zoubi aka Abu Omar Tibiya, the Islamic State commander for Damascus, following a raid in Maadamiya, Rif Dimashq Governorate.
- 25 December – Authorities claim the killing of one of the most prominent leaders of Islamic State in Syria in a joint operation with the US-lead coalition near Damascus.
- 26 December – A bombing at a mosque in Homs kills at least eight people and injures 18 others.
- 28 December – Two people are killed in clashes between protesters demonstrating against the Ali ibn Abi Talib Mosque bombing and security forces in Latakia.
- 29 December – The government introduces new banknotes for the Syrian pound to replace those issued during the Assad regime.
- 30 December – The government institutes a curfew in Latakia following sectarian violence in the city, which has a large Alawite population.
- 31 December – A police officer is killed in a suicide bombing in Aleppo.

== Holidays ==
In October 2025, President Ahmed al-Sharaa issued a presidential decree defining the country’s official holidays, removing 8 March Revolution Day, Teachers’ Day, Tishreen Liberation War Day and Martyrs' Day from the list. The decree introduces two new official holidays: the anniversary of Syrian Revolution Day on 18 March and Liberation Day on 8 December, which commemorates the fall of the Assad regime.

- 1 January – New Year's Day
- 18 March - Syrian Revolution Day
- 21 March – Mother's Day
- 30 March – 1 April – Eid al-Fitr
- 17 April – Independence Day
- 20 April – Gregorian Easter
- 20 April – Julian Easter
- 1 May – Labour Day
- 6–9 June – Eid al-Adha
- 26 June – Islamic New Year
- 4 September – The Prophet's Birthday
- 8 December – Liberation Day
- 25 December – Christmas Day

== Deaths ==
- 6 January – Sarya Abdulkarim al-Rifa'i, 77, Islamic scholar.
- 15 May – Adeeb Kaddoura, 76, Syrian-Palestinian actor.
- 19 May – Fadwa Mohsen, 87, actress.
- 14 June – Hajj Ghafil al-Ahmad al-Yassin, 82, Free Syrian Army fighter.
- 1 August – Maabad al-Hassoun, 68, writer.
- 3 August – Diala al-Wadi, actress.
- 19 October – Abdul Rauf al-Kasm, 93, architect, prime minister (1980–1987) and governor of Damascus (1979–1980).
- 14 December – Riyad Naasan Agha, 78, Minister of Culture (2006–2010)
- 18 December – Hassan al-Nifi, 62, writer and poet.
- 29 December – Emad al-Armashi, 74, researcher and historian.
