= 2026 in Syria =

- Decades: 2000s; 2010s; 2020s
- See also: History of Syria; Timeline of Syrian history; List of years in Syria

Events in the year 2026 in Syria.

== Incumbents ==
=== Central government ===
Office	Image	Name	Tenure
President of the Syrian Arab Republic		Ahmed al-Sharaa	29 January 2025–present
Speaker of the People's Assembly		Abdul Hamid al-Awak	12 July 2026–present
President of the Supreme Constitutional Court		Issam al-Khalif	11 July 2026–present

=== Legislature ===
- People's Assembly: Transitional People's Assembly (12 July 2026–present)

=== Governorates ===
Governors
- Damascus Governorate: Maher Marwan
- Rif Dimashq Governorate: Amer al-Sheikh
- Aleppo Governorate: Azzam al-Gharib
- Idlib Governorate: Mohammed Abdul Rahman
- Hama Governorate: Abdul Rahman al-Sahyan
- Homs Governorate: Abdul Rahman al-Aama (until 9 May); Murhaf Khaled al-Naasan (since 9 May)
- Latakia Governorate: Ahmed Ali Mustafa
- Tartus Governorate: Ahmad al-Shami
- Daraa Governorate: Anwar al-Zoubi
- Quneitra Governorate: Ghassan Elias al-Sayyed Ahmad
- Suwayda Governorate: Mustafa al-Bakour
- Deir ez-Zor Governorate: Ghassan al-Sayyed Ahmed (until 9 May); Ziad al-Ayesh (since 9 May)
- Raqqa Governorate: Vacant (until 19 January); Abdul Rahman Salama (since 19 January)
- Hasakah Governorate: Vacant (until 13 February); Noureddin Issa Ahmed (since 13 February)

== Events ==
For events related to the civil war, see Timeline of the Syrian civil war (November 2024–present)

=== January ===
- 3 January –
  - An unidentified missile explodes at Mezzeh Air Base in Mezzeh, Damascus.
  - The United Kingdom and France carry out a joint airstrike on an underground arms cache used by Islamic State north of Palmyra.
  - New banknotes for the Syrian pound to replace those issued during the Assad regime begin circulation.
- 6 January – At least nine people are killed in clashes between the transitional government and the Syrian Democratic Forces (SDF) in Aleppo. The fighting subsides with the SDF's withdrawal on 11 January.
- 10 January – A drone attack is carried out on the headquarters of the Aleppo Governorate's government in Aleppo city.
- 13 January – The Syrian army declares the towns of Maskana and Dayr Hafir in Aleppo Governorate as closed military zones due to the presence of the SDF.
- 16 January –
  - President Ahmed al-Sharaa issues a decree recognising Syrian Kurds as an essential part of the Syrian people and the country's diverse national identity. The decree also recognizes Kurdish as a national language and Nowruz as a national holiday.
  - The United States carries out an airstrike in northwestern Syria that kills a senior al-Qaeda militant.
- 17 January – The Syrian army retakes Dayr Hafir following the withdrawal of the SDF.
- 18 January –
  - The Syrian army retakes the Al-Omar field following the withdrawal of the SDF.
  - The transitional government reaches a ceasefire agreement with the SDF, allowing for the government in Damascus to reassert control over Al-Hasakah, Deir ez-Zor and Raqqa Governorates.
- 19 January – Around 120 members of Islamic State held in al-Aqtan prison in Al-Shaddadah escape amid clashes in the town between the Syrian army and the SDF.
- 20 January – The transitional government reaches a new four-day ceasefire agreement with the SDF. The ceasefire is extended for another 15 days on 24 January.
- 21 January –
  - The transitional government takes control of the Al-Hawl refugee camp from the SDF.
  - Seven Syrian army soldiers are killed in a drone strike blamed on the SDF in Al-Hasakah Governorate.
- 30 January –
  - The SDF reaches a comprehensive agreement with the transitional government to be integrated into the Syrian Armed Forces.
  - The Lebanese government approves an agreement allowing for the repatriation of Syrian nationals serving prison sentences in Lebanon.

=== February ===
- 4 February – The Syrian Petroleum Company signs an agreement with Chevron Corporation and Qatar's Power International Holding to develop Syria's first offshore oil and gas field.
- 7 February – Syria and Saudi Arabia sign a series of investment agreements that include the development of new airports in Aleppo and the establishment of a low-cost Syrian-Saudi airline called Flynas Syria and the SilkLink telecommunications project.
- 12 February – The Syrian army retakes control of the Al-Tanf military base following the withdrawal of US forces.
- 15 February – The Syrian army retakes control of the al-Shaddadi military base following the withdrawal of US forces.
- 21 February – Islamic State carries out attacks on Syrian Army personnel in Mayadin and Raqqa.
- 22 February – The Al-Hawl refugee camp is completely vacated.
- 23 February – Islamic State militants kill four Syrian security personnel in Raqqa.
- 28 February – In retaliation for the 2026 Israeli–United States strikes on Iran, Iran launches missiles at neighbouring countries, with at least four people being killed by an Iranian missile strike in Sweida Governorate.

=== March ===
- 9 March – Syrian civil war, Syria–United Kingdom relations: The United Kingdom's Crown Prosecution Services charges a former soldier from the Air Force Intelligence Directorate with three counts of murder and three counts of torture as crimes against humanity under the International Criminal Court Act for his attacks on civilians in Damascus in 2011.
- 17 March – Parliamentary elections are held in Raqqa, Tabqa and Tal Abyad.
- 20 March – Israeli forces strike Syrian military sites, including command and control centres and supply depots, in the south of the country, claiming to be in response to Syrian government attacks on the Druze population.

=== April ===
- 16 April – The US military completes its withdrawal from Qasrak air base in Hasakah Governorate.
- 20 April – The Yarubiyah border crossing with Iraq reopens for the first time since 2011.
- 24 April – Amjad Yousef, an Assad-era intelligence official involved in the killings of inmates at a prison in Tadamon in 2022, is arrested in Hama Governorate.

=== May ===
- 1 May – A Shiite cleric is killed in a grenade attack on his car in Sayyidah Zaynab.
- 9 May – President al-Sharaa implements a cabinet reshuffle that also sees the removal of his brother Maher al-Sharaa as Secretary-General to the Presidency.
- 19 May – A soldier is killed while 21 people are injured in a car bombing near a facility of the defense ministry in the Bab Sharqi area of Damascus.
- 21 May – Three people are killed in a landmine explosion in Abu Habbah, Idlib Governorate.
- 23 May – Turkey apprehends 10 Islamic State operatives in Syria.
- 24 May – Parliamentary elections are held in Kobani and Hasakah Governorate.

=== June ===
- 15 June – A court in the Netherlands sentences a Syrian asylum-seeker to 26 years' imprisonment for the torture and rape of imprisoned opponents of the Assad regime during the Syrian Civil War.
- 19 June — The US Central Command announces that it killed Ali Husayn al-Ulaywi, a senior Islamic State leader in a strike in northwestern Syria.
- 20 June –
  - Two soldiers are killed in an Islamic State attack in the vicinity of Manbij.
  - Sami al-Oraydi, a senior leader of the Islamist militant group Hurras al-Din, is killed in a U.S.-led coalition airstrike in northern Syria.

=== July ===
- 1 July — President al-Sharaa appoints the remaining 70 vacancies in the People's Assembly of Syria.
- 2 July — At least nine people are killed and 20 others are injured in a bombing at a cafe in Damascus.
- 6 July — French President Emmanuel Macron visits Syria, in first visit by a western leader since the fall of Assad regime.
- 7 July — Twin explosions in Damascus kill one person and injure 36 others.
- 8 July — France returns 23 Syrian antiques it has held since the civil war.
- 12 July — The People's Assembly convenes for the first time since the fall of the Assad regime.
- 16 July — Syria states that it thwarted an attempt to transfer armaments to Hezbollah through Iraq.
- 25 July — Thirty-five people are killed in a bus accident along the Deir ez-Zor-Damascus road.

=== August ===
- 4 August — Syria says that it found several Grad projectiles hidden in Al-Harra.
- 6 August — Fourteen people are wounded in an explosion in Jaramana.
- 9 August – Syria and Russia reach an agreement on the future of Tartus and Khmeimim military bases following 18 months of negotiations.
- 10 August — Colombia recognizes Israeli sovereignty over the Golan Heights.
- 11 August –
  - A court in Damascus sentences former President Bashar al-Assad to death in absentia for crimes against humanity and war crimes committed during the Syrian civil war. The court also sentences Assad's cousin and former official Atef Najib on similar charges.
  - Three Israeli settlement activists are arrested by the IDF after entering the country.
- 14 August — A former Syrian security officer who served under the Assad regime and was convicted in Austria of crimes including sexual assault amid the Syrian civil war is released before completing his punishment and returns to the country.
- 18 August —
  - Israel carries out an attack on Abu al-Duhur Air Base, claiming that Turkey was planning to deploy its soldiers there.
  - Foreign Minister Asaad al-Shaibani announces that nuclear material discovered at an undisclosed site in Syria is not harmful and will remain in Syrian possession, subject to the IAEA's guarantees.
  - An explosion occurs at a pipeline in the Al-Jabsah gas plant, which the Syrian Petroleum Company attributes to sabotage.
- 21 August — Syrian Kurds declare the completion of civil and military integration with Syria's official institutions.
- 22 August —
  - Syria formally applies for membership in the International Partnership Against Impunity for the Use of Chemical Weapons on the anniversary of the Ghouta chemical attack.
  - An Israeli attack on a vehicle in Beit Jinn injures several people. The IDF states that it targeted a militant.
  - Several members of the Syrian Internal Security Forces are wounded in a bomb attack on their vehicle near Damascus.
- 24 August —
  - Syria is removed by the US Department of State from its State Sponsors of Terrorism list.
  - A court in Damascus sentences Ahmad Badreddin Hassoun, the Grand Mufti of Syria from 2005 to 2021, to life imprisonment for crimes relating to the Syrian civil war.
- 25 August — Mazloum Abdi, the head of the Syrian Democratic Forces, announces the group’s dissolution.
- 28 August — Mazloum Abdi is appointed by president al-Sharaa as a presidential adviser, while the education ministry issues a decision allowing Kurdish-language instruction in public and private schools.
- 29 August —
  - Druze militias in As-Suwayda Governorate prevent students from traveling to take official exams, demanding that they be held instead in areas under their control, citing security concerns.
  - Intermittent clashes break out between Druze spiritual leader Hikmat al-Hijri's armed group and government forces in Suwayda.
- 30 August —
  - Two civilians are killed by government shelling in Suwayda.
  - A soldier who served under the Assad regime is killed after opening fire on security forces who attempt to arrest him.

=== September ===
- 1 September — The IAEA announces that a Syrian site attacked by Israel in 2007 is "consistent with nuclear reactor", adding that the Assad regime “failed to report nuclear material, facilities and activities.”
- 2 September — Former Israeli Prime Minister Ehud Olmert confirms for the first time that Israel was behind the 2008 assassination of Assad's top military adviser, Muhammad Suleiman, due to his responsibility in the construction and security of a Syrian nuclear facility in Deir ez-Zor that Israel struck in 2007.
- 3 September — Syria's UN envoy states that the country has begun to destroy chemical weapons materials from the Assad era.
- 9 September —
  - Fourteen people are killed and 11 others are injured in an explosion at an arms depot in the vicinity of Sarmada.
  - The Syria noncompliance complaint is lifted by the IAEA.
- 11 September — Authorities announce the arrest of nine former pilots for alleged involvement in the shelling of rebel-held areas during the civil war.
- 12 September — At least seven people are killed in a jail riot and fire in Kobani.
- 13 September —
  - Fuel price increases spark largest protests since the fall of the Assad regime throughout the country.
  - A boy is killed in an unexploded ordnance explosion in the vicinity of Damascus.
- 16 September — Syria abolishes the Counter-Terrorism Court established by the Assad regime in 2012.
- 17 September – Former Adra Prison director and Deir ez-Zor governor Samir Ousman Alsheikh is sentenced to 60 years in prison in the United States for torturing detainees while running Adra Prison from 2005 to 2008.
- 18 September – Singer Assala performs in the country after a 15-year exile.
- 19 September –
  - Authorities announce the arrest of the leader of a militant cell involved in the killing of security personnel while they were trying to arrest an Islamic State militant in As-Sanamayn.
  - Eleven people are killed in a blast at a military site in Deir ez-Zor Governorate.
- 21 September – At least four people are wounded in a blast at an arms depot in an army facility near Al-Eiss.
- 22 September – Fourteen Israeli settlement activists are arrested by the IDF after crossing into the country.
- 29 September – Amid the 2026 Strait of Hormuz crisis, Iraq starts importing gasoline through the port of Baniyas.
- 30 September –
  - Authorities announce that they detained a cell connected to Hezbollah who were preparing rocket launchers from Yarmuk basin in Daraa Governorate, a claim denied by Hezbollah.
  - Syria is removed from the US munitions export prohibition list.
  - Three power plants are out of service following an explosion at the Tishreen plant.
  - At least seven people are killed in a gun attack on a bus in Homs.

=== October ===
- 5 October — Syria signs a framework agreement with Eagle Hills Properties for two major property development projects.
- 15 October —
  - Two oil and gas pipelines are attacked in two separate incidents across the country.
  - Two supporters of former President Bashar al-Assad are sentenced to death by an Aleppo court for inciting an uprising last year.
- 18 October — Syria and the World Bank agree to establish a fund for recovery and reconstruction.
- 20 October — Authorities announce that two members of the security forces were killed in an operation targeting a cell connected with the Islamic State in Rankous.
- 23 October — Hundreds of Syrians demonstrate against IDF operations on their soil.
- 26 October — Jordan announces that it carried out attacks against militant hideouts in Daraa Governorate in response to a deadly church attack blamed on organizations operating there. However, Syria announces that eight people, including three children and an elderly man, were killed in the attacks. Syria later shuts the Nasib Border Crossing. Jordan claims that the strikes killed 20 Islamic State militants, but also admitted civilian casualties.
- 28 October —
  - Jordan and Syria decide to form a joint investigative committee following the Jordanian strikes against Islamic State militants in Syria.
  - Iraqi Prime Minister Ali al-Zaidi arrives in Damascus to meet with President al-Sharaa, marking the first visit of an Iraqi prime minister to Syria since the fall of the Assad regime.
- 29 October — Five people, including four children, are killed in flash floods in several governorates.
- 31 October — The Jordanian Armed Forces announces that it stopped 14 armed individuals who were trying to cross the northern border from Syria, adding that it had inflicted multiple casualties during a firefight.

=== November ===
- 3 November — Authorities state that they thwarted a Hezbollah-connected plot to attack the Homs oil refinery.
- 4 November — The defence ministries of Saudi Arabia and Syria sign a cooperation pact.
- 9 November — Syria confirms sending soldiers to Saudi Arabia to defend the country from the Houthis.
- 14 November — Two people, including a child, are killed and at least one person is injured in a car bombing in Jaramana.
- 16 November — The European Union decides to revive a cooperation agreement with Syria.
- 19 November – Following a joint statement by three Christian patriarchs denouncing frequent kidnappings and attacks on the minority, residents of the Christian-majority town of Al-Suqaylabiyah in Hama Governorate organize a candlelit protest calling for security and the release of kidnapped jeweler Maher Sankari.
- 22 November – Authorities destroy 400 million captagon tablets, 12.2 metric tons (13.4 short tons) of hashish, and additional confiscated narcotics seized during prior security operations.

== Holidays ==
In January 2026, President Ahmed al-Sharaa issued a further decree establishing Newroz as a public holiday.

- 1 January – New Year's Day
- 18 March – Syrian Revolution Day
- 20–22 March – Eid al-Fitr
- 21 March – Mother's Day
- 21 March – Newroz
- 5 April – Gregorian Easter
- 12 April – Easter (Eastern Christianity)
- 17 April – Independence Day
- 1 May – Labour Day
- 26-30 May – Eid al-Adha
- 16 June – Islamic New Year
- 25 August – The Prophet's Birthday
- 8 December – Liberation Day
- 25 December – Christmas Day

== Deaths ==
- 11 January – Ahmad Melli, 80, actor.
- 20 January – Rifaat al-Assad, 88, vice president (1984–1998).
- 3 March – Muhammad al-Khuli, 88, chief of the air force intelligence directorate (1970–1987) and the air force (1994–1999).
- 16 July – Feras Esmaeel, 43, footballer (Al-Karamah, Zakho, national team).
- 30 July – Timoteo Hikmat Beylouni, 80, Syriac Catholic hierarch, apostolic exarch of Venezuela (since 2011).
- 7 September – Joseph Arnaouti, 90, Armenian Catholic hierarch, patriarchal exarch of Damascus (1997–2023).
