= Hussein al-Salama =

Syrian intelligence official

- حسين السلامة
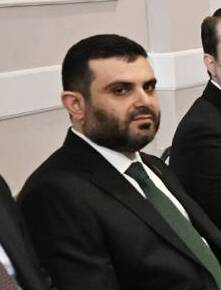
- Al-Salama in 2026

Deputy Director of the National Security Office
- Incumbent
- Assumed office 19 July 2026
- President: Ahmed al-Sharaa
- Preceded by: Position established

Director of the General Intelligence Service
- In office 3 May 2025 – 19 July 2026
- President: Ahmed al-Sharaa
- Preceded by: Anas Khattab
- Succeeded by: Abdul Qader Tahan

Acting Governor of Deir ez-Zor (Note: Also responsible for Raqqa and Al-Hasakah.)
- In office December 2024 – 7 January 2025
- Succeeded by: Ghassan al-Sayyed Ahmed

Personal details
- Born: 1984 (age 41–42) Al-Shuhayl, Deir ez-Zor, Syria
- Party: Independent
- Other political affiliations: Hay'at Tahrir al-Sham (until 2025)
- Nickname: Abu Musaab al-Shuhayl (Note: Arabic: أبو مصعب الشحيل)

Hussein al-Salama, (Note: Arabic: حسين السلامة, also transliterated as Hussein al-Salamah) also known as Abu Musaab al-Shuhayl, is a Syrian intelligence officer and former militant leader. He currently serves as the Deputy Director of the National Security Office, having being appointed by President Ahmed al-Sharaa.

Previously, he also served as the director of the General Intelligence Service of Syria from May 2025 until 19 July 2026, succeeding Anas Khattab.

== Early life and education ==
Al-Salama was born in 1984 in the town of Al-Shuhayl in the countryside of Deir ez-Zor Governorate and belongs to the Al-Uqaydat tribe. He holds a certificate from the Institute of Technical Supervisors, and a diploma in Management and Economics.

== Career ==
Al-Salama was formerly a member of Al-Qaeda and then a senior commander in Hay'at Tahrir al-Sham. Getting closer to Ahmed al-Sharaa, he later became affiliated with the Syrian government following the fall of the Assad regime and was appointed as the acting governor for the Governorates of Deir ez-Zor, Raqqa, and al-Hasakah. He resigned less than a month after the appointment, stating that he had refused from the beginning to assume the governorship, preferring instead to pursue a military path. He also stressed that the situation in the eastern region as a whole, and Deir ez-Zor Governorate in particular, is extremely complex, with many entities and countries harboring ambitions for it. He added that he would not be able to manage the work on all levels, and that the tribal aspect that dominates the social fabric in Deir ez-Zor has caused him great trouble in his work.

Following an agreement between the Syrian government and the Syrian Democratic Forces (SDF) in March 2025, he was tasked with overseeing negotiations and security arrangements, particularly in the context of ongoing political and military developments in the region.

On 3 May 2025, he was appointed Director of the General Intelligence Service of Syria, making him also a member of the National Security Council of Syria. On 19 July 2026, he was then appointed as the Deputy Director of the National Security Office, with Abdul Qader Tahan succeeding him as the director of the General Intelligence Service.

== See also ==
- Syrian caretaker government
- Syrian transitional government
- Politics of Syria
