= National Security Council (Syria) =

Government security agency in Syria

- Emblem of Syria

Agency overview
- Formed: 12 March 2025
- Jurisdiction: Government of Syria
- Ministers responsible: Ahmed al-Sharaa, President of Syria; Murhaf Abu Qasra, Ministry of Defense; Anas Khattab, Ministry of Interior; Abdul Qader Tahan, General Intelligence Service

The National Security Council (Arabic: مجلس الأمن الوطني) is the primary coordinating body for security and defense matters in Syria, established on 12 March 2025 during the governmental transition that followed the fall of the Assad regime in December 2024. The governmental body represents the first security coordination council of its kind in Syria's post-Assad era. The council operates under the authority of Syrian President Ahmed al-Sharaa and oversees the country's response to internal security challenges. The council's establishment coincided with escalated clashes between government forces and pro-Assad holdouts, and the subsequent widespread massacres of Alawite minority civilians that occurred in March 2025.

== History ==
Following the governmental transition that followed the fall of the Assad regime in December 2024, the People's Assembly was dissolved, as many former security officials associated with the Assad regime were replaced. The new government leadership consisted predominantly of individuals affiliated with Hayat Tahrir al-Sham (HTS) and allied groups that formed the rebel coalition responsible for removing Assad from power.

The National Security Council was officially announced via the Syrian presidency's Telegram channel on 12 March 2025. The establishment decree cited "supreme national interest" and the necessity to "enhance national security" as primary motivations behind the council's formation. The presidential statement emphasized the need for a coordinated response to the security and political challenges facing Syria during its transitional period.

The council's creation coincided with increasing violence throughout Syria with escalated clashes that erupted in the coastal provinces of Latakia and Tartus, which quickly escalated into widespread sectarian massacres targeting the Alawite minority and caused nearly 1,400 civilian casualties.

On 13 March 2025, Syrian President Ahmed al-Sharaa ratified the Constitutional Declaration, which is intended to remain in effect for five years. Article 41 states: "The President of the Republic declares general mobilization and war after the approval of the National Security Council."

== Organization ==
The National Security Council consists of representatives from Syria's various security apparatuses, including the Ministry of Defense, the Ministry of Interior, the General Intelligence Service. Two advisory seats will be assigned by the president, along with a "specialized technical" seat to supervise "technical and scientific matters related to the minutes of the session."

According to the establishment decree, the National Security Council was designed for "coordinating and managing security and political policies" throughout Syria. Meetings were to be held either on a regular schedule or at the president's discretion. Decisions were to be implemented through consultation among council members, while specific tasks and operational mechanisms were to be determined by presidential directives.

=== Members ===
No.	Name	Ministry
1	Ahmed al-Sharaa	President of Syria
2	Murhaf Abu Qasra	Minister of Defense
3	Anas Khattab	Minister of Interior
4	Abdul Qader Tahan	Director of General Intelligence Service

== See also ==
- Syrian transitional government
- Syrian Interim Government
