= Public holidays in Syria =

Syrian public holidays

Public holidays in Syria consist of various cultural, nationalistic, and religious holidays.

The primary national holiday in Syria is the Independence Day, celebrated on 17 April of every year, which celebrates the evacuation of the last French troops in Syria, officially ending the French Mandate for Syria.

In October 2025, President Ahmed al-Sharaa issued a presidential decree defining the country’s official holidays, removing March 8 Revolution Day, Teachers’ Day, Tishreen Liberation War Day and Martyrs' Day from the list. The decree introduces two new official holidays: the anniversary of Syrian Revolution Day on 18 March and Liberation Day on 8 December, which commemorates the fall of the Assad regime. In January 2026, President al-Sharaa issued a further decree establishing Newroz as a public holiday.

Workers covered by the provisions of the Basic Law for State Workers are entitled to a holiday with full pay.

== List of public holidays ==
Date	English name	Local name	Remarks
1 January	New Year's Day	عيد رأس السنة الميلادية ‘Īd Ra’s as-Sanät al-Mīlādīyä	First day of the year in the Gregorian calendar
18 March	Syrian Revolution Day	عيد الثورة السورية ʿĪd ath-Thawrah as-Sūriyah	Anniversary of the Syrian Revolution
21 March	Newruz	نوروز ’Nāwroz	Persian New Year (celebrated mostly by Kurds in Syria)
21 March	Mother's Day	عيد الأم ‘Īd al-’Umm	Celebrates honouring mothers (on the same day as Newroz)
17 April	Independence Day	عيد الجلاء ‘Īd al-Ğalā’	Celebrates evacuation of last French troops in 1946
variable	Gregorian Easter	عيد الفصح غريغوري ‘Īd al-Fiṣḥ Ġrīġūrī	According to the Gregorian calendar (The second Sunday of April)
variable	Julian Easter	عيد الفصح اليوليوسي ‘Īd al-Fiṣḥ al-Yūliyūsī	According to the Julian calendar (The third Sunday of April)
1 May	Labour Day	عيد العمال ‘Īd al-‘Ummāl	Celebrate the achievements of workers
8 December	Liberation Day	يوم التحرير; Yawm al-Tahrir	Anniversary of the fall of the Assad-led Ba'athist regime
25 December	Christmas Day	عيد الميلاد المجيد ‘Īd al-Mīlād al-Mağīd	Celebrated by Syrian Christians and Alawites
Dates following the lunar Islamic calendar
Dhu al-Hijjah 10	Eid al-Adha	عيد الأضحى ‘Īd al-’Aḍḥà	The four days of Eid Al-Adha (ayyam al tashriq) are holidays
Shawwal 1	Eid al-Fitr	عيد الفطر ‘Īd al-Fiṭr	The three days of Eid Al-Fitr are holidays
Rabi' al-awwal 12	Mawlid	المولد النبوي al-Maulid an-Nabawī	Prophet Muhammad's Birthday
Muharram 1	Islamic New Year	عيد رأس السنة الهجرية ‘Īd Ra’s as-Sanät al-Hījrīyä	

== See also ==
- History of Syria
