= Ahmad Muaffaq Zaidan =

Journalist

- أحمد موفق زيدان
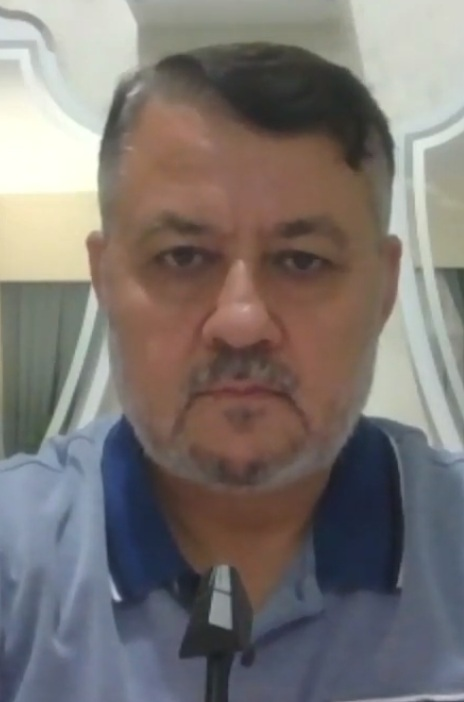
- Zaidan in 2021

Adviser to the Presidency for the Media Affairs
- Incumbent
- Assumed office 22 August 2025
- President: Ahmed al-Sharaa
- Preceded by: Position established

Personal details
- Citizenship: Pakistan, Syria
- Occupation: Journalist and war correspondent
- Known for: Syrian Civil War journalism, Osama Bin Laden and Al Qaeda Interviews, allegedly being put in American Disposition Matrix, member of Al-Sharaa Cabinet

Ahmad Muaffaq Zaidan (Arabic: أحمد موفق زيدان) is a Pakistani-Syrian journalist and politician who has served as the Adviser to the Presidency for Media Affairs since 22 August 2025 under Ahmed al-Sharaa. Zaidan gained notability for being one of the few journalists to interview Osama bin Laden prior to the September 11 attacks.

In 2015, documents leaked by Edward Snowden, revealed that the National Security Agency had labeled Zaidan, who at the time was Al Jazeera's longtime Islamabad bureau chief, as a member of Al-Qaeda.

== Career ==
=== Relationship with Osama bin Laden ===
As Al Jazeera's longtime bureau chief Zaiden regularly visited visited Afghanistan, visiting in more frequent spurts between October 2000 and January 2001 where he met and interviewed Osama Bin Laden for the first time. Zaidan was the recipient of the first tape released by Bin Laden in response to the U.S. bombings of Tora Bora. Zaidan’s coverage of the event was broadcast on Al Jazeera, contributing to his recognition as a journalist with unparalleled access to important events and people. Before Osama Bin Laden's death, documents were released that indicated Bin Laden's paranoia over spying in the terrorist organization, and expressed concern over the monitoring of Zaidan.

=== Edward Snowden leak and NSA accusation ===
In 2015, former National Security Agency Intelligence contractor and whistleblower Edward Snowden leaked documents that revealed that the NSA had labeled Al Jazeera affiliated Zaiden in addition to Middle East Monitor's Bilal Abdul Kareem as affiliated with terror organizations. Abdul Kareem, was reporting from rebel-held areas in northern Syria at the time, where he has filmed interviews with Al-Qaeda members, and Zaidan was known as one of the few journalists to interview Osama bin Laden before the Sept. 11, 2001, attacks. Snowden's leaked documents revealed that Zaidan and Kareem were flagged by the SKYNET program, which is a program used by the United States National Security Agency to perform machine learning analysis on terror suspects by tapping their cellular data networks.

According to The Intercept, Snowden's files include a 2012 slide showing a photo of Ahmad Muaffaq Zaidan that lists him as a member of Al Qaeda, a member of the Muslim Brotherhood, and an employee of Al Jazeera. In the file Zaidan was also given a terror watch list identification number. Zaidan was alledgely singled out for monitoring due to his close relationship with Al-Nusra Front's Abu Mohammed al-Julani, and the founder of Al Qaeda, Osama bin Laden. Zaidan has interviewed bin Laden several times throughout his career in journalism.

Members of the press were outraged by the accusations and alleged spying by the United States federal government on journalists based in warzones. With articles penned on how putting journalists on terrorism watch lists is a clear violation of press freedom. After the information was published, Zaidan, who holds dual Pakistani and Syrian citizenship, claimed he feared for his life, and fled Pakistan for Qatar, where Al Jazeera is based.

== Court case, initial refusal to dismiss ==
In 2017, Zaidan and Kareem filed a lawsuit against the United States government in the District of Columbia, claiming they had put the two journalists on a "kill list," and requesting his removal from the Disposition Matrix. Zaidan and Kareem filed a lawsuit in U.S. District Court in Washington, contending that they were erroneously placed on the "kill list" during the Obama administration and that the 2016 Trump administration illegally maintained the designation.

In the suit, which was filed by human rights group Reprieve, both men denied any association with Al Qaeda or the Taliban. The journalists also alleged that their targeting violated a longstanding presidential executive order against assassination, and that they are not lawful targets under the Authorization for Use of Military Force passed by Congress after the Sept. 11, 2001 terrorist attacks.

Both lawsuits were dismissed with the judge in the Zaidan lawsuit claiming that his targetting was speculative.

== Adviser to the Presidency for the Media Affairs ==
On 22 August 2025, Zaidan, who himself had been accused of being part of the Muslim Brotherhood, wrote a column in Al Jazeera calling for the dissolution of its Syrian branch. This piece was published around the same time al-Sharaa publicly distanced himself from the Brotherhood and associated Islamist groups in addition to disavowing the popular uprisings of the Arab Spring.

In the article for Al Jazeera, Zaidan remarks of the failure of the Syrian Muslim Brotherhood to achieve their goals with their current power structure and model, implying that it is outdated. And he suggests, to follow the example of more pragmatic, like-minded Brotherhood offshoots, such as those associated with Hassan al-Turabi, Rached Ghannouchi, and Recep Tayyip Erdoğan. In the piece for Al Jazeera Zaidan argues for dissolving the former power structure and embracing the current political movement led by Ahmad Al-Sharaa with the goal of reconstructing Syria.
