= Liberation Day (Syria) =

Public holiday in Syria

Liberation Day يوم التحرير
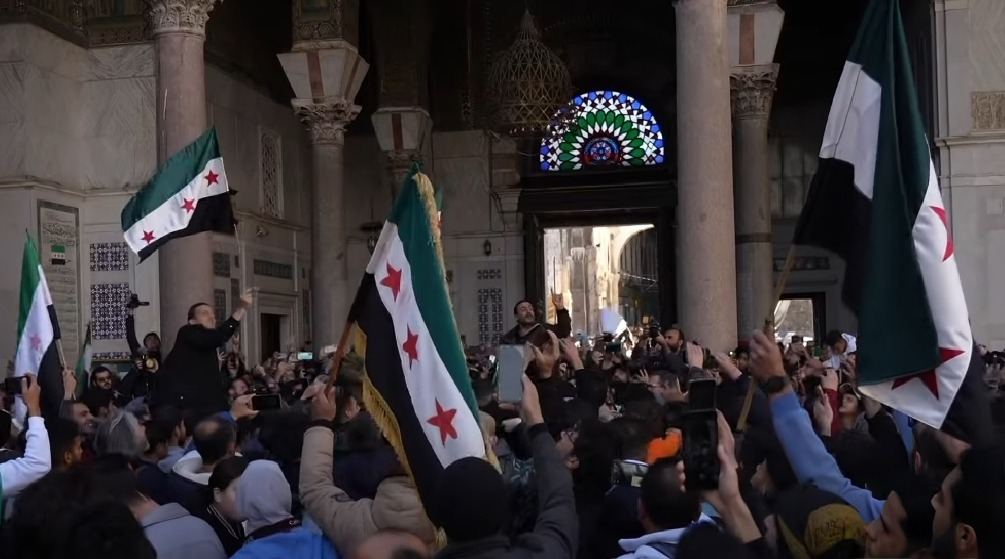
- Rebels celebrate the fall of Assad at the Umayyad mosque, December 2024
- Also called: Anniversary of the fall of the Assad regime
- Observed by: Syria
- Type: National
- Significance: Commemorates the fall of the Assad regime
- Observances: Parades, fireworks, and public gatherings
- Date: 8 December
- Next time: 8 December 2026
- Frequency: Annual
- First time: 2025
- Related to: Syrian Revolution Day (18 March)

Liberation Day (Arabic: يوم التحرير) is a public holiday in Syria, celebrated on 8 December to mark the fall of the Assad regime, which began in 1971 when Hafez al-Assad seized power and was later succeeded by his son Bashar al-Assad in 2000. The holiday was established in October 2025 following a decree by President Ahmed al-Sharaa.

== Historical background ==
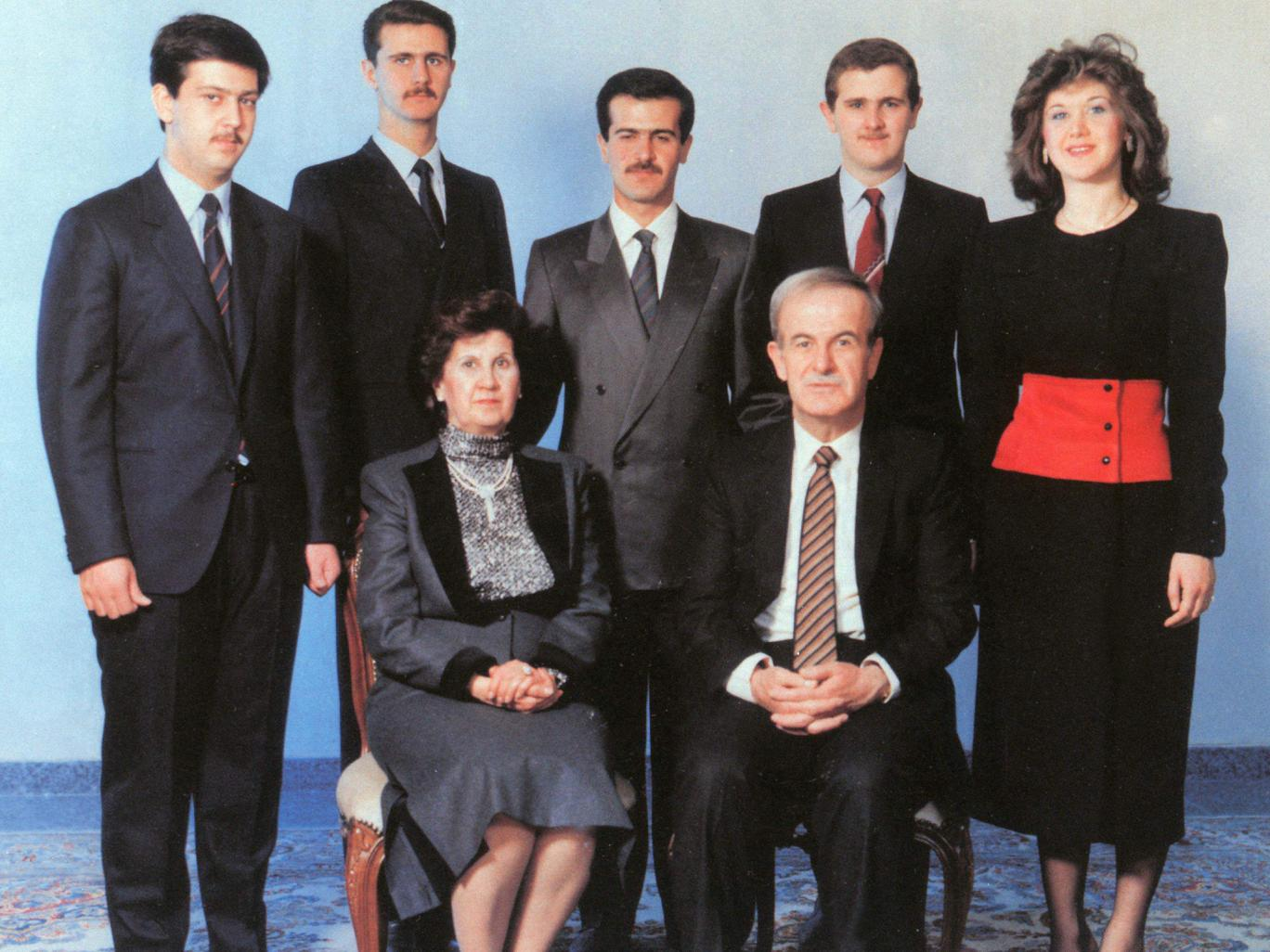
The Assad family, c. 1993

The Ba'athist regime emerged in 1963 following a coup d'état led by Alawite Ba'athist military officers. Another coup in 1966 brought Salah Jadid to de facto power, while Nureddin al-Atassi assumed the presidency. In 1970, Jadid and al-Atassi were overthrown by Hafez al-Assad during the Corrective Movement.

The Assad family had ruled Syria since 1971, when Hafez al-Assad seized power and became the president of Syria under the Syrian Ba'ath Party. Under Hafez, Ba’athist Syria became a police state that suppressed any dissent. After his death in June 2000, he was succeeded by his son Bashar al-Assad.

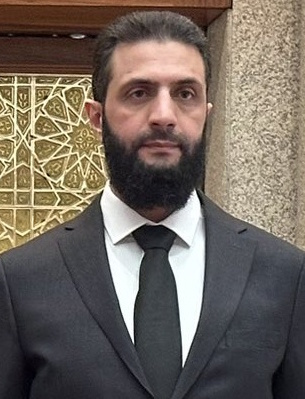
Ahmed al-Sharaa had been Syria's de facto leader until January 2025, after leading the overthrow of Bashar al-Assad

Bashar al-Assad was the president of Syria from 2000 until his overthrow on 8 December 2024. His presidency was marked by authoritarian rule and the suppression of political dissent. His government faced mounting criticism for corruption, human rights abuses, and the violent crackdown on the 2011 protests, which eventually led to the outbreak of the Syrian civil war. The war involved numerous international actors, with countries like Russia and Iran supporting Assad's regime, while opposition groups received backing from Western and regional powers.

The 2024 Syrian opposition offensives, codenamed "Deterrence of Aggression," were led by Hay'at Tahrir al-Sham (HTS) and supported by allied Turkish-backed groups in the Syrian National Army. These offensives resulted in the rapid fall of Bashar al-Assad's government, ending five decades of Assad family rule. As a rebel coalition moved closer to Damascus, reports indicated that Bashar al-Assad had fled the capital by plane to Russia, where he joined his exiled family and was granted political asylum by the Russian government. After his departure, opposition forces announced their victory on state television. At the same time, Russia's Ministry of Foreign Affairs confirmed his resignation and departure from Syria.

Then-HTS leader Ahmed al-Sharaa became the de facto leader of Syria on 8 December as the General Commander and head of the New Syrian Administration, serving until 29 January 2025, when he was appointed President of Syria by the Syrian General Command. After the fall of the Assad regime, Mohammad Ghazi al-Jalali, Assad's ninth prime minister, remained in office in a caretaker capacity with the support of the opposition and al-Sharaa until the formation of the caretaker government led by Mohammed al-Bashir. The position of prime minister was abolished on 29 March 2025, when the Syrian transitional government replaced the caretaker administration.

== Observance ==
In December 2024, the National Coalition of Syrian Revolutionary and Opposition Forces declared 8 December of each year a national holiday in Syria. In January 2025, during the Syrian Revolution Victory Conference, Hassan Abdul Ghani, the spokesman for the rebels' Military Operations Command, announced that 8 December, the date of the fall of the Assad regime, would be declared a national holiday.

In October 2025, President Ahmed al-Sharaa issued a presidential decree officially designating the date of Assad's fall as an annual holiday called "Liberation Day." Workers covered by the provisions of the Basic Law for State Workers are entitled to a holiday with full pay.

The General Secretariat of the Presidency issued a declaration declaring 7 and 8 December 2025 as public holidays for state institutions on the occasion of Liberation Day. The Democratic Autonomous Administration of North and East Syria ordered the suspension of work in the public institutions under its authority on 8 December 2025.

=== Celebrations ===
==== 1st Anniversary ====
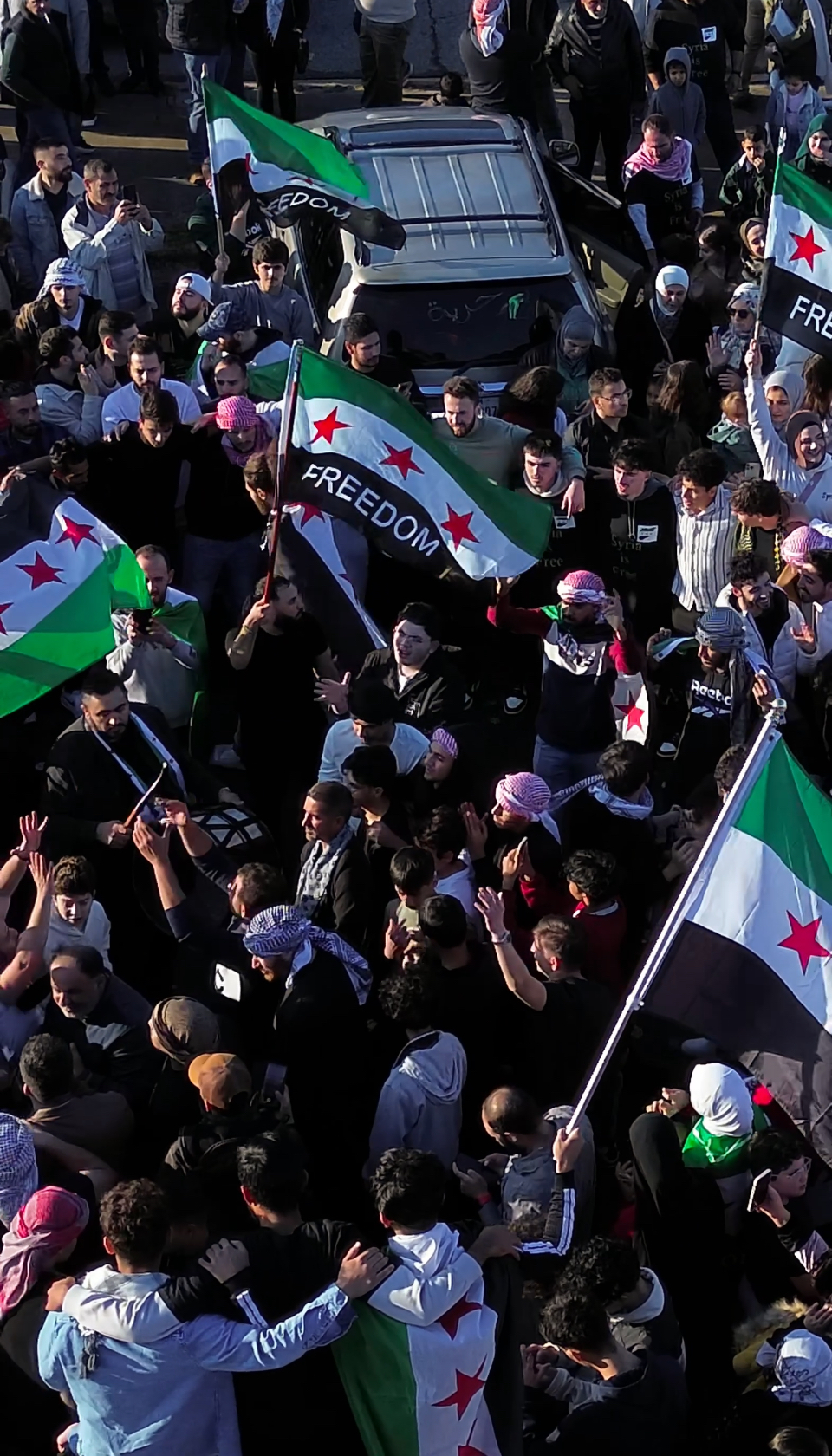
Celebrations were held in Richardson, Texas after the fall of the regime

President Ahmed al-Sharaa performed the dawn prayer on 8 December 2025, at the Umayyad Mosque in Damascus on the first anniversary of the fall of the Assad regime. After the prayer, al-Sharaa, dressed in the same military uniform he had on when he entered Damascus a year earlier, addressed Syrians and said, “No one, no matter how great, will stand in our way. No obstacle will stop us, and together we will face every challenge, God willing.” He recalled his first foreign trip after the takeover, a visit to Saudi Arabia, where he performed Umrah and received a fragment of the Kaaba’s covering as a gift from Crown Prince Mohammed bin Salman, who said it was installed in the Umayyad Mosque to symbolize ties between Saudi Arabia and Syria. Presidential Media Adviser Ahmad Muaffaq Zaidan said that the military uniform used by al-Sharaa served as a reminder to Syrians of the victory the country was celebrating that day.

Al-Sharaa, along with Foreign Minister Asaad al-Shaibani, Defense Minister Major General Murhaf Abu Qasra, Interior Minister Anas Khattab, Damascus Governor Maher Marwan, and several military leaders, attended a military parade organized by the Ministry of Defense on the Mezzeh Highway in Damascus to celebrate Liberation Day. In Aleppo, the parade moved through several neighborhoods to the Citadel, with multiple units involved. Similar parades were held in Latakia, Tartus, Deir ez-Zor, Homs, Hama, and Daraa.

Afterwards, in a speech at the Damascus Conference Palace, al-Sharaa said that the people had written “a page of heroism and a story of great victory.” He described the era of the former regime as “a dark page” that caused sectarian conflict and fear among the people and turned citizenship into “a certificate of loyalty.” He referred to the integration of the various armed forces into a unified national army based on professionalism and loyalty to the homeland, describing this as a key step in consolidating security and stability. He stressed the government's commitment to the principle of transitional justice, ensuring accountability for those who committed violations and safeguarding victims’ rights. Syrian First Lady Latifa al-Droubi attended a gathering at the Damascus Conference Palace to celebrate Liberation Day.

Fireworks and light shows were held during the Liberation Day celebrations in Umayyad Square in Damascus. The Liberation Day events also featured traditional dance performances and musical theatre. In areas controlled by the Syrian Democratic Forces, demonstrations were held in Raqqa (northeastern Syria) and Deir ez-Zor (eastern Syria) to celebrate Liberation Day and to protest the ban. During the celebrations in Damascus, the Ministry of Health reported that a 17-year-old boy died from complications related to smoke inhalation and overcrowding, and more than 260 people required medical assistance. According to the Ministry of Interior, the number of participants in the Liberation Day events on 8 December 2025 exceeded 5.3 million.

== Commemoration ==
Sheikh Ghazal Ghazal, head of the Islamic Alawite Council in Syria and Abroad, urged his community to boycott the celebrations of Bashar al-Assad's ouster, saying it would express their opposition to what he calls the oppressive rule of the new authorities.

=== Commemorative postage stamps ===
On 8 December 2025, the Syrian Post issued a set of commemorative postage stamps to mark Liberation Day.

=== North and East Syria ===
In December 2025, the Executive Council, under the de facto autonomous region of the Democratic Autonomous Administration of North and East Syria (DAANES), which consists of self-governing sub-regions, banned gatherings, social events, and the use of live ammunition or fireworks on 7–8 December. The Council said the decision was due to heightened security threats from terrorist cells seeking to use the anniversary of the former regime's fall for their purposes and described the move as necessary to protect citizens and maintain public security.

On 7 December 2025, the DAANES issued a statement on the first anniversary of Bashar al-Assad's fall, calling on the transitional government to adopt an inclusive national policy that ensures the building of a new homeland for all Syrians without exception.

On 8 December 2025, Syrian Democratic Forces (SDF) Commander Mazloum Abdi congratulated Syrians on the first anniversary, stating that Syria had entered a new phase that ended decades of authoritarianism and division. He expressed hope that the political developments at the time would strengthen stability and help build institutions that better represented the people. He also reaffirmed his commitment to the 10 March agreement, which he described as “a foundation for building a democratic, decentralised state.”

== See also ==
- Modern history of Syria
