= Tauqir Sharif =

Aid worker

- توقير شريف
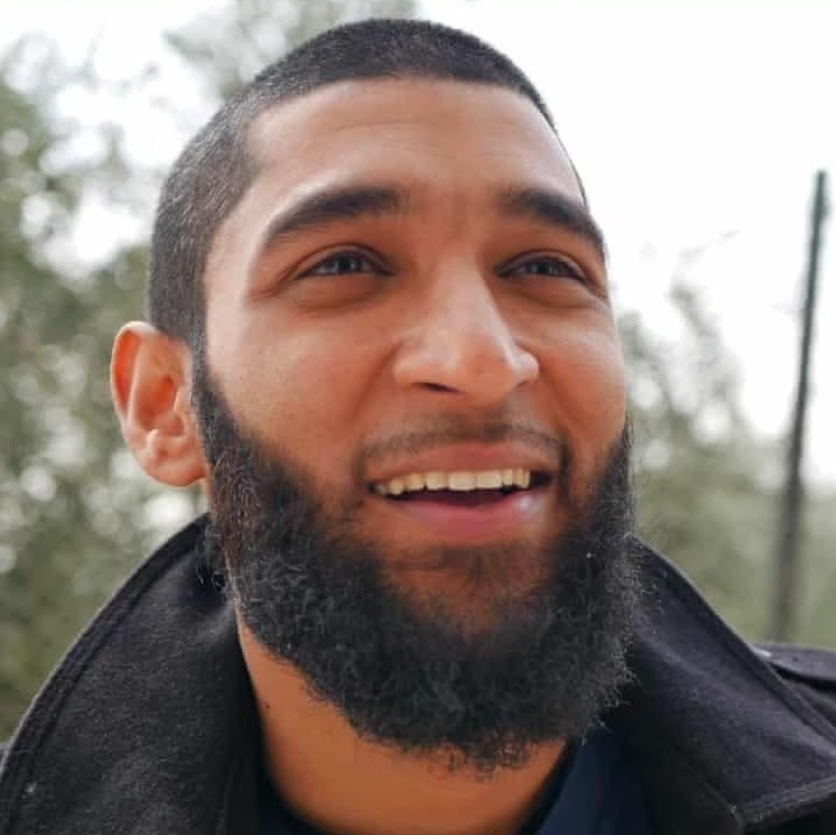
- Born: 1987 or 1988 (age 37–38); Walthamstow, London, England
- Education: Nottingham Trent
- Occupation: Aid worker

Tauqir Sharif is a British Pakistani aid worker known for his activity in Syria, his involvement in several convoys including the 2010 Gaza Freedom Flotilla and Road to Hope.

== Early life and education ==
Sharif is from Walthamstow in London. He graduated from Nottingham Trent University and worked as a gas engineer before leaving the UK.

== Career ==
=== Gaza flotilla activism ===
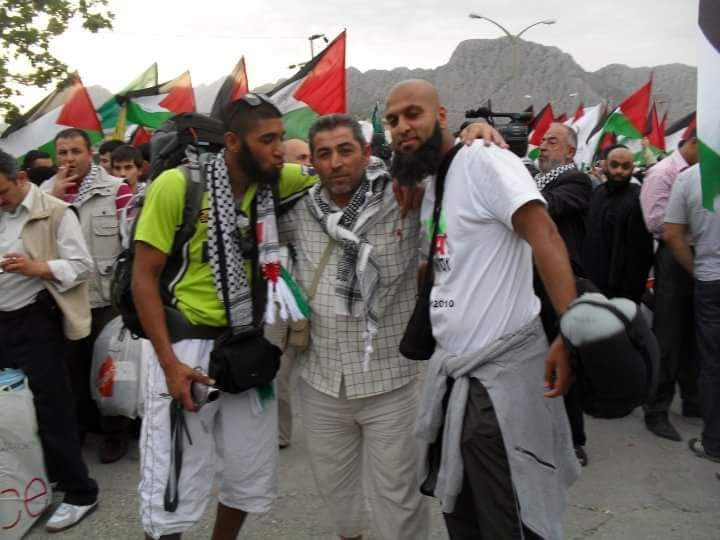
Sharif in 2010

Sharif was one of the participants in the Gaza Freedom Flotilla of 2010, specifically on board the MV Mavi Marmara He was a member of a charity whose aims were to bring humanitarian aid supplies to Gaza, Viva Palestina, which was founded by controversial British MP George Galloway. Sharif was one of 29 Britons who were held in Israel following the 2010 Gaza flotilla raid, and was given consular assistance while in Israeli custody. He was released after two days with minor injuries. One of his close friends, İbrahim Bilgen was shot four times. After coming back to England he said he was having flashbacks having seen dead bodies and badly injured people, but also spoke of his desire to train as a paramedic and return to Gaza and other places such as Sudan and Haiti. He also spoke of his disappointment that the aid did not reach Gaza, saying that it was the sole purpose of the trip. The United Nations interviewed Sharif in their investigation of the raid. He also gave talks around the UK about his experiences on the Gaza flotilla.

=== Road to Hope ===
Sharif was one of seven British aid workers on the Road to Hope humanitarian aid convoy to Gaza who were kidnapped in November 2010 by the owner of M.V. Strofades IV, a ferry chartered to transport them to Al Arish in Egypt. The captain claimed that he had set sail to prevent around 150 activists from boarding, because he was afraid that they would divert the ship to Gaza. Ten aid workers had already boarded the ship, including the seven Britons. Sharif alerted the Guardian by text message that the ship had been seized in Derna Port, Libya. The ship finally docked in Piraeus port, Greece where British consular assistance provided them with papers while they waiting to get their passports returned to them from Libya.

=== Work in Syria ===
In 2012, Sharif was head of logistics, delivering the first aid convoys to Syria from the UK, and had planned to be there for a few weeks. Since then Sharif has been doing humanitarian aid work there. He provides aid for internally displaced people in IDP camps in Atmeh, and particularly for women and children, two groups which have been otherwise left without support. Sharif has visited Syrian Civil Defence facilities and delivered aid to their volunteers. One SCD worker said of Sharif that his successes in running aid initiatives are on a par with the top aid agencies in the area. Sharif's aid organisation, Live Updates from Syria, employs up to 170 people. He also drives an ambulance and has participated in helping to rescue the victims of airstrikes from the rubble.

Sharif and his wife Raquel Hayden Best have worked on a project to build a school for women and children as well as with a number of other charities. They have received regular donations from the UK. Sharif stores aid supplies such as food supplies and supplies for mothers and children in his own warehouse in Syria.

In 2016 the BBC published video footage of Sharif working in the rebel held areas of Idlib province, in which he was assisting internally displaced people, who had just arrived from Aleppo. Sharif also filmed 24 hours inside a hospital in Aleppo for ITV. The video footage illustrated the difficulties of running a hospital on the frontline of the war, with a shortage of supplies and equipment. ITV published footage of Sharif distributing food aid and delivering medical supplies to a hospital in Aleppo which was shown on News at Ten. Clarissa Ward interviewed Sharif about the difficulties of bringing aid to Aleppo in an interview published on CNN live. In a video interview with CNN, Sharif explained the challenges faced when bringing aid to Syria.

== Citizenship revocation ==
The British Home Office removed Sharif's British citizenship in 2017, on the grounds of 'secret intelligence'. Videos published by TRT World and BBC explained that the UK Home Office had stated that Sharif was "Aligned with an Al-Qaeda aligned group", claims which he 'strongly denied'.

In his appeal Sharif requested an open court hearing and for evidence to be brought before a judge and jury. Moazzam Begg highlighted specific issues in challenging cases such as Sharif's through the Special Immigration Appeals Commission in an interview in a TRT World documentary.

Director of the International Centre for the Study of Radicalisation at King’s College London, Shiraz Maher, said that Sharif had gone to Syria before the rise of ISIS and was not, in his opinion, there to fight, saying: “The fact he's managed to stay alive this long also suggests he is not there to fight. At one point the average British citizen travelling to Syria stayed alive just nine months after arrival, because they all went immediately to the front lines.”

As a result of Sharif's citizenship revocation the Syria Civil Defence distanced itself from him, but several of their volunteers expressed concern and consternation at the news.

== HTS capture and detainment ==
On 22 June 2020, Sharif was captured and detained by the Al Qaeda aligned salafist jihadi group Hayat Tahrir al-Sham (HTS), the Syrian Observatory for Human Rights confirmed. He was taken from his family home by about 15 members of the group. Following Sharif's capture, HTS shut down the offices belonging to the media project 'Live Updates from Syria' and raided the homes of other foreign nationals linked to Sharif, confiscating mobile phones and laptops.

Cage advocacy organization called on HTS to confirm that Sharif was being treated humanely;

"Despite his immense sacrifices, Tox [(a nickname for Sharif)] has endured assaults by the [Assad] regime, survived bombing attempts by ISIS [Islamic State] and had his nationality revoked by the British government without any evidence presented against him. I hope they understand how much Tox has endured in his efforts to help the people of Syria."

— Moazzam Begg, Cage

Sharif's wife was allowed one visit at a separate location, from which she ascertained he was being held in solitary confinement. She described a head injury which she said was inflicted during the arrest. Over two weeks after his arrest Al Jazeera reported that his exact location and health condition remained unknown.

A spokesperson for HTS, Taqi al-Deen Omar revealed that the group's motives for the detention related to allegations of the "mismanagement of humanitarian funds and its use towards projects that sow sedition and division". CNN war correspondent Bilal Abdul Kareem also recalled an incident in which a block of flats, built by Sharif for widows and orphans, had been occupied by armed HTS members and Sharif had encountered difficulty in evicting them.

Following the arrest, there were demonstrations in Atmeh demanding Sharif's release, which included many benefactors of his aid work. Sharif was released on bail on 10 July 2020, with HTS stating that evidence for the arrest warrant had been presented to the judiciary and that Sharif had been given fifteen days bail to prepare for trial by a military court.

He was subsequently re-arrested, and released again during November 2020. Sharif maintains that he was tortured while being held by HTS.

== Personal life ==
Sharif had been married to Racquell Hayden-Best for ten months when he moved to Syria with her and set up home in Atmeh. After moving to Syria he took two other wives and has ten children. In March 2015, following an airstrike close to their family home, Al Jazeera reported on Sharif's exasperation at the delays in obtaining a UK passport for his baby daughter who was born in Turkey in 2013. Shortly after the birth of his daughter he had submitted document to the British passport office, and for eight months he received no response to emails and phone calls. Eventually, he was then told that his signature was 'outside the box', and that he needed to start the process from scratch. Sharif said he had always prepared his family for the fact they may have to leave at some point due to the dangers they were living in.
