= Kafr Maris =

Kafr Maris كفر مارس
- Village
- Location in Syria
- Coordinates: 36°7′0″N 36°33′54″E
- Country: Syria
- Governorate: Idlib
- District: Harem District
- Subdistrict: Kafr Takharim Nahiyah

Population (2004)
  - Total: 350
- Time zone: UTC+2 (EET)
  - Summer (DST): UTC+3 (EEST)
- City Qrya Pcode: C4159

Kafr Maris (Arabic: كفر مارس) is a Syrian village located in Kafr Takharim Nahiyah in Harem District, Idlib. According to the Syria Central Bureau of Statistics (CBS), Kafr Maris had a population of 350 in the 2004 census. It is a Druze village of the Jabal al-Sumaq region. On 21 October 2025, several residents were killed and others wounded when a unidentified gunman on a motorbike opened fire on a bus near the village.
