= Abdul Qader Tahan =

Major General Abdul Qader Tahan
- عبد القادر طحان

Director of the General Intelligence Service
- Incumbent
- Assumed office 19 July 2026
- President: Ahmed al-Sharaa
- Preceded by: Hussein al-Salama

Deputy Minister of the Interior
- In office 1 February 2026 – 19 July 2026
- President: Ahmed al-Sharaa
- Succeeded by: Maleh al-Shantut

Personal details
- Born: 1980 (age 45–46) Aleppo, Syria
- Party: Independent
- Other political affiliations: Hay'at Tahrir al-Sham (until 2025)

Military service
- Allegiance: Syrian opposition (2011–2024); Syria (2025– present)
- Branch/service: Ministry of Interior
- Years of service: 2012 — present
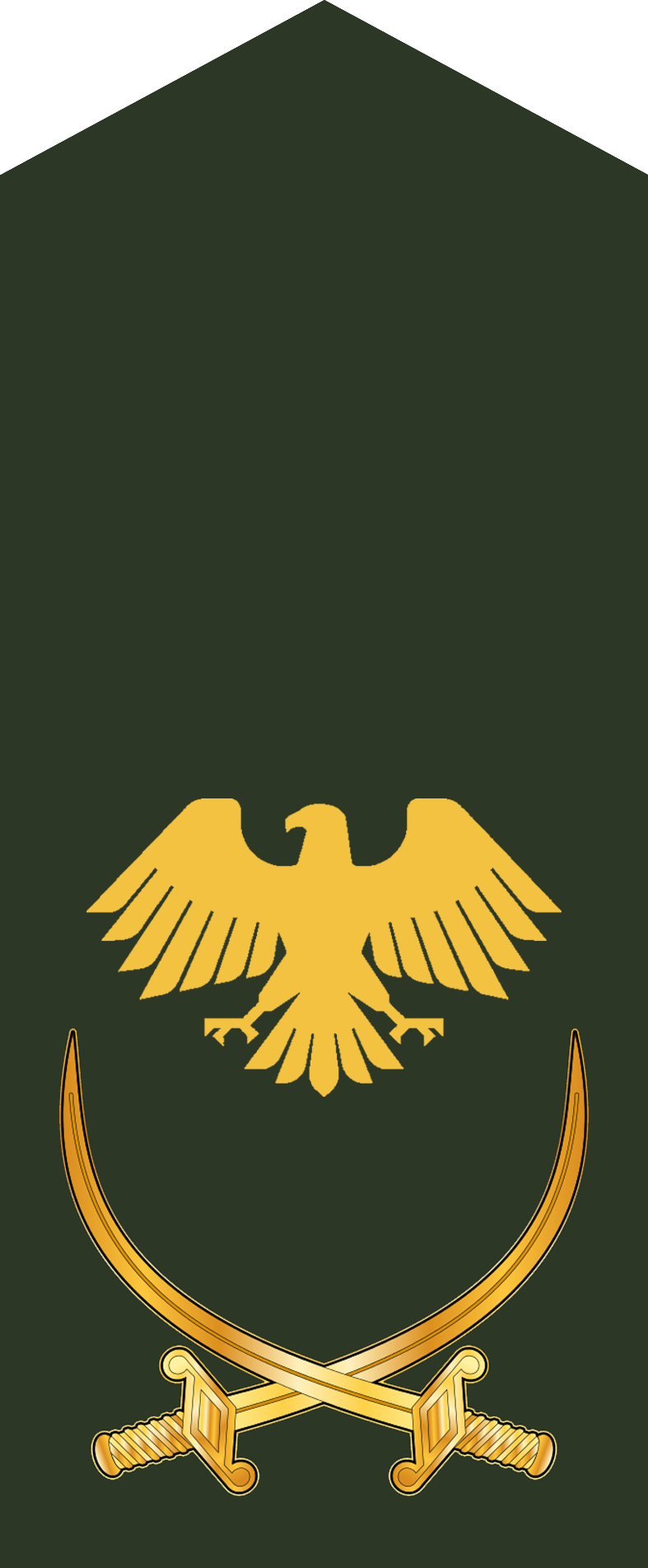
- Rank: Major general
- Battles/wars: Syrian civil war

Abdul Qader Tahan (Arabic: عبد القادر طحان; born 1980), is a Syrian security official and military officer. He has served as Director of the General Intelligence Service.

== Early life and education ==
Tahan was born in 1980 in Aleppo, Syria. He studied Islamic sciences at the al-Sha'baniyah School in Aleppo and later at the Fath Institute in Damascus. In 2008 he enrolled in the Arabic language department at the University of Aleppo and later continued his studies, including a master's programme in literature, at the University of Idlib.

== Career ==
Tahan joined the Syrian uprising from its early stages in 2011. In mid-2012 he founded the Quds Battalion (Katibat al-Quds) in the western countryside of Aleppo. The group later expanded into the Islamic Quds Brigades (Kata'ib al-Quds al-Islamiyya).In July 2015 the brigades under his leadership joined Jabhat al-Nusra (later Jabhat Fatah al-Sham and then Hay'at Tahrir al-Sham, HTS). Within HTS he moved into security roles under the names Abdullah Amer Agha and Abu Amer al-Halabi. He served as security official for western Aleppo (2016), deputy security official for Aleppo governorate (2017), and later held positions in western Idlib and as director of the Jisr al-Shughur area (2019–2020). Between 2021 and 2023 he headed the Inspection and Oversight Directorate at the Interior Ministry of the Syrian Salvation Government.

After the fall of the Assad government in December 2024, Tahan took a leading role in the General Security Service. On 25 May 2025 he was appointed Assistant Minister of the Interior for Security Affairs with the rank of major general.

On 19 July 2026, President Ahmed al-Sharaa appointed him Director of the General Intelligence Service, succeeding Hussein al-Salama.
