= Ahmed Abdulkadir Warsame =

Somali prisoner of the United States (born c. 1980)

Ahmed Abdulkadir Warsame (born c. late-1980s) is a Somali prisoner of the United States. He is said to have described himself as a coordinator between the Somali al-Shabab and al-Qaeda in the Arabian Peninsula, and is under indictment in federal district court in New York City.

Warsame was captured April 19, 2011, aboard a fishing vessel transiting the Gulf of Aden in international waters between Yemen and Somalia by Navy SEALs of SEAL Team 6 Silver squadron. The Seals were on in Navy fast boats hidden behind a wooden ship and stealthily boarded Warsame's boat. The SEALs subdued Warsame and his associate without a shot being fired. He was later transferred, held, and interrogated in military custody aboard the USS Boxer for two months. Several days later, he was given a Miranda warning by civilian officials, who proceeded to question him and then had him flown to New York, arriving July 5, where he was indicted by a grand jury and held for trial.

Several American political figures have objected to his appearing in Federal court instead of being sent to the Guantanamo Bay detention camp for a military tribunal. Representative Howard McKeon, chairman of the United States House Committee on Armed Services, said transferring Warsame out of Guantanamo "directly contradicts Congressional intent and the will of the American people," and Senator Susan Collins stated that captured foreign nationals "should be tried in a military commission, not a federal civilian court in New York or anywhere else in our country".

In December 2011 Warsame pleaded guilty to nine terrorism charges and provided valuable intelligence information.
