= Anwar al-Zoubi =

Syrian politician (born 1975)

Sheikh Anwar al-Zoubi
- أنور الزعبي

Governor of Daraa
- Incumbent
- Assumed office 5 March 2025
- President: Ahmed al-Sharaa
- Preceded by: Asaad Yazid al-Toukan

Personal details
- Born: 1975 (age 50–51) Al-Taybah, Daraa, Syria
- Education: Idlib University; Al-Shamal Private University
- Nickname: Abu Suhaib (أبو صهيب)
- Military career
- Allegiance: Ahrar al-Sham (c. 2012)
- Conflicts: Syrian civil war; Daraa Governorate campaign

Anwar Taha al-Zoubi (Arabic: أنور طه الزعبي) is a Syrian politician and former military commander. He was appointed Governor of Daraa Governorate on 5 March 2025 by Syria's caretaker government, following the fall of the Assad regime.

== Early life and education ==
Al-Zoubi was born in 1975 in Al-Taybah, Daraa. He studied political science at Idlib University, and graduated from the Faculty of Political Science at Al-Shamal Private University on 6 September 2025.

== Activity during the civil war ==
Al-Zoubi joined the Syrian opposition by 2012, becoming a commander of Ahrar al-Sham in Daraa Governorate. In 2018, al-Zoubi was among the opposition leaders deported to Idlib Governorate following their surrender to the Assad regime after the 2018 Southern Syria offensive, with a local activist describing him to Al-Araby Al-Jadeed as one of the "most prominent figures" from Daraa to be sent to northwestern Syria.

In the areas controlled by the Syrian Salvation Government, he played an "active role" on the societal level. He worked to help establish the General Reconciliation Council, a branch of the Idlib Tribal Council formed in early March 2020, and was appointed as its director.

== Post-Assad ==
After the fall of the Assad regime, he was appointed governor of Daraa Governorate on 5 March 2025.
