= Kuwaya =

Kuwaya كويا
- Village
- Location within Syria
- Coordinates: 32°45′0″N 35°49′15″E
- Grid position: 226/238 PAL
- Country: Syria
- Governorate: Daraa
- District: Daraa
- Subdistrict: Shajara

Population (2004 census)
  - Total: 2,025
- Time zone: UTC+3 (AST)

Kuwaya (كويا, also transliterated Kuwayya, Kuwayah or Koya) is a village in southern Syria, administratively part of the Daraa Governorate, located west of Daraa. It is situated on the slopes north of the Yarmuk River. According to the Syria Central Bureau of Statistics, Kuwaya had a population of 2,025 in the 2004 census.

== History ==
=== Ottoman period ===
In 1596 Kuwaya appeared in the Ottoman tax registers as part of the nahiya (subdistrict) of Jawlan Sharqi in the Qada of Hauran. It had an all Muslim population consisting of 8 households and 2 bachelors. A fixed tax−rate of 25% was paid on wheat (1,500 akçe), barley (900 a.), summer crops (200 a.), goats and/or beehives (100), in addition to occasional revenues (100 a.); a total of 2,800 akçe.

In 1884 American archaeologist Gottlieb Schumacher described Kuwaya as "a few miserable huts of mud and stone" on the northern slopes of the Yarmuk river valley. The village was owned by the partly Bedouin tribe of Manadhirah, who encamped there and used the village's dwellings as storage for their grain. Kuwaya's environs contained pomegranate gardens, vineyards, farmlands, and springs amid scattered ruins. Schumacher noted the Manadhirah "cultivated with much industry" the village lands, growing barley and wheat on the slopes and lemons, grapes, pomegranates and olives closer to the village site and at the mouth of the nearby Wadi al-Zayyatin stream.

== Bibliography ==
- Hütteroth, W.-D.; Abdulfattah, K. (1977). Historical Geography of Palestine, Transjordan and Southern Syria in the Late 16th Century. Erlanger Geographische Arbeiten, Sonderband 5. Erlangen, Germany: Vorstand der Fränkischen Geographischen Gesellschaft. ISBN 3-920405-41-2.
- Schumacher, G. (1886). Across the Jordan: Being an Exploration and Survey of part of Hauran and Jaulan. London: Richard Bentley and Son.
