= Al-Taybah, Daraa Governorate =

Al-Taybah الطيبة
- Village
- Location within Syria
- Coordinates: 32°33′48″N 36°14′38″E
- Grid position: 265/226 PAL
- Country: Syria
- Governorate: Daraa
- District: Daraa
- Subdistrict: Daraa

Population (2004 census)
  - Total: 7,969
- Time zone: UTC+3 (AST)

Al-Taybah (Arabic: الطيبة, also transliterated al-Tayyibah or al-Ta'iba), historically called Tayyibat al-Ism, is a village in southern Syria, administratively part of the Daraa Governorate, located west of Daraa. According to the Syria Central Bureau of Statistics, al-Taybah had a population of 7,969 in the 2004 census. It is predominantly inhabited by members of the Zu'bi clan, which has a substantial presence in Daraa and several other villages in the governorate.

== History ==
In 1884 Gottlieb Schumacher noted that Tayyibat al-Ism consisted of scattered piles of ruins of unhewn and weathered stones, possibly caused by an earthquake. To the west of the site, along the Wadi al-Lubweh stream, were the remains of a mill.

== Bibliography ==
- Schumacher, G. (1886). Across the Jordan: Being an Exploration and Survey of part of Hauran and Jaulan. London: Richard Bentley and Son.
