= Bilal Abdul Kareem =

American-Syrian Journalist

- Darrell Lamont Phelps
- Born: Darrell Lamont Phelps
- Citizenship: United States,
- Occupations: Journalist and war correspondent
- Employer(s): CNN, OGN (On the Ground News) TV
- Known for: Syrian Civil War journalism and allegedly being put in American Disposition Matrix

Bilal Abdul Kareem (born Darrell Lamont Phelps) is an American journalist and war correspondent covering the Syrian civil war who has worked with CNN. He believes that he has been placed on the US kill list. He claims to have survived five drone assassination attempts by the US military, which killed random civilians that were present nearby, including two attacks on vehicles he was traveling in, and including one where the car he was sitting in was blown up by a missile shot from a drone.

He has been criticized by some observers for a perceived alignment with jihadi fighters in Syria, with The New York Times reporting that Kareem was considered a "jihadist propagandist" to some.

On August 13, 2020, it was reported that Abdul Kareem had been arrested by Hay'at Tahrir al-Sham in Atme, northern Idlib. After six months of detention, he was freed on February 17, 2021. He is married with 3 wives and has 11 children.

General Security Service arrested Abdul Kareem in al-Fath Mosque, al-Bab on 22 December 2025.

== Early life and career ==
Abdul Kareem, born Darrell Lamont Phelps, grew up in Mount Vernon, New York; he attended Mount Vernon High School, then studied creative writing at Purchase College SUNY, before going on to work in stand-up comedy. He converted to Islam, partly due to its "emphasis on clean living", travelled to Egypt to study Arabic, where he later obtained a presenting role with Saudi-funded television channel, Huda TV. After leaving Huda TV due to "disagreements", he travelled to Rwanda and Libya to film documentaries, before arriving in Syria in 2012 where he was first hosted by Ahrar al-Sham. He filmed Khadijah Dare and her husband and son in 2013, talking about their lives as a jihadist family, and the footage was broadcast on Channel 4.

== On the Ground News ==
After initially working with Western mainstream news outlets, such as Sky News and the BBC, he helped found On The Ground News.

== Court case, initial refusal to dismiss ==
In 2017, he filed a lawsuit against the United States government in the District of Columbia, claiming they had attempted to assassinate him, and requesting his removal from the Disposition Matrix, usually referred to as the "kill list". Another journalist, Ahmad Muaffaq Zaidan, who is thought to have also been placed on the American kill list, co-sued with him.

In June 2018, government lawyers asked the court to dismiss the lawsuit claiming Bilal could not provide proof he was being targeted as he could not substantiate his claims given the secrecy surrounding targeting decisions and that the government had complete authority in military operations outside of the United States. U.S. District Judge Rosemary M. Collyer rejected the government request to dismiss the lawsuit and in the opinion paper wrote:

Due process is not merely an old and dusty procedural obligation. . . . It is a living, breathing concept that protects US persons from overreaching government action even, perhaps, on an occasion of war.

— U.S. District Judge Rosemary M. Collyer

The judge also ruled that Bilal cannot challenge the laws that allows the US government to put someone on the "kill list" or target those on it, but as an American citizen he has the right to due process before being added and to know whether his speech as a reporter is protected by the first amendment or not, as the reason Bilal claims he is on the list is because of his speech.

The judge also distinguished the case from previous killings of U.S. citizens such as the drone strike that killed Anwar al-Awlaki, stating that Bilal is not challenging the "kill list" program or military operations but is challenging the process that places a citizen on the list without notice or a challenge.

The judge also dismissed Ahmad Muaffaq Zaidan from the lawsuit as his claims that he is a target were speculative. Ahmad is not a U.S. citizen.

== Subsequent near misses ==
In May 2019, he survived being shelled by a Syrian Army tank in Idlib but was wounded by shrapnel. He was with Sky News reporters during the attack.

In July 2019, Bilal and his crew survived nearby shelling by a Russian jet's autocannon on the Hama frontline.

== Dismissal of court case ==
The government filed a subsequent motion to dismiss arguing that the case could not go forward because the relief sought by Kareem (information about whether he was on the kill list, presentation of the evidence that was used to put him there, a description of the process that was used to put him there, and removal from the list) along with any evidence that might be used in the case were all protected by the state secrets privilege. The court sided with the government and dismissed the case, leaving Kareem without any recourse:

"Without access to the privileged information, Mr. Kareem is unable to establish whether he has targeted by the lethal force or what information was considered in reaching the alleged decision to target him. Mr. Kareem is "incapable of demonstrating that [he has] sustained a violation of" his constitutional rights without the information ... He 'has alleged, but ultimately cannot show, a concrete injury amounting to either a specific present objective harm or a threat of specific future harm. in this instance, in which the relevant information is solely in the control of the United States and is protected by the state secrets privilege, Mr. Kareem is left with no method to obtain it to pursue his case, which must therefore be dismissed.

== Arrest by Hay’at Tahrir al-Sham ==
In August 2020, Bilal and aid worker Tauqir Sharif were arrested by Hay'at Tahrir al-Sham. Residents of Idlib, including family members of Sharif and associates of Bilal, have protested the arrests by Hay'at Tahrir al-Sham, citing the lack of any official charges and lack of any visits or information being afforded to family and friends. Tauqir Sharif was eventually released in November 2020, followed by the release of Bilal Abdul Kareem in February 2021.

== 2025 arrest by Syrian transitional government ==
In December 2025, Bilal was arrested by the Syrian General Security Service, allegedly due to his negative reporting on Syrian president Ahmed al-Sharaa's government. Before his arrest, Bilal had grown increasingly critical of the Syrian transitional government, criticizing its decision to join the United States-led coalition against the Islamic State and allegedly straying from Islamic governance. As of May 2026, Bilal was still in custody.
