= Rami Al Ali =

Syrian-born fashion designer

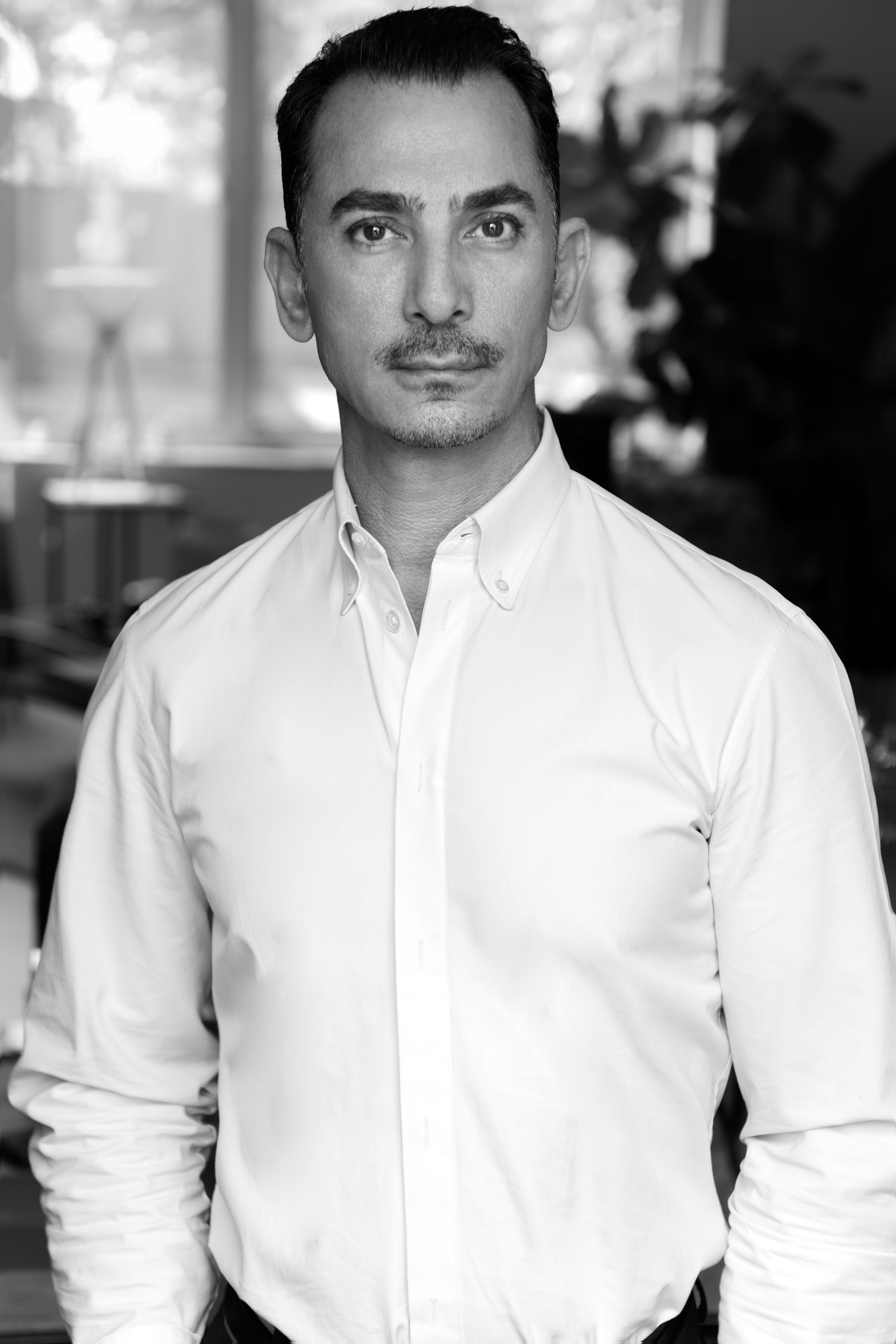
- Born: Syria
- Education: College of Fine Arts in Damascus, Syria
- Occupations: Creative Director and Fashion Designer
- Years active: 2000-Active
- Organization: Rami Al Ali Couture
- Notable work: Ard Dyar, Personal Revolutions
- Honours: Nomination for BoF 500 - Class of 2023
- Website: https://ramialali.com

Rami Al-Ali (Arabic: رامي العلي) is a Syrian fashion designer. Al Ali graduated from the College of Fine Arts in Damascus, Syria with a degree in Visual Communications in 1995. Then, he decided to move to the United Arab Emirates to gain more experience in the fashion industry before creating his label, Rami Al Ali, in 2001.

== The House ==
Al Ali made a breakthrough in his fashion design career in 2009 when he showed on the official couture calendar at Alta Moda Alta Roma in Italy. Moreover, he made his debut at Paris Couture Week in 2012.

In 2014, Al Ali expanded his repertoire by launching a ready-to-wear line, characterized by classic silhouettes and elegant lines, reflecting a modern approach to luxurious evening wear. The brand continued to evolve, introducing Rami Al Ali White in 2020, a collection of ready-to-wear bridal designs.

In June 2025, Rami Al Ali was invited to present his collection in Paris, as part of the official Haute Couture fashion show schedule of the Fédération de la Haute Couture et de la Mode. He became the first Syrian designer to be welcomed onto the official Haute Couture calendar.

== Celebrities ==
Al Ali's designs have gone to dress many celebrities including the Indian actress Aishwarya Rai Bachchan, Beyoncé, Jennifer Lopez, the Syrian singer Assala, Amal Clooney, Naomi Campbell, Eva Longoria, Helen Miren, Sharon Stone, Leonnie Hanne, Fan Bingbing, Yussra, and many more.

== Art & Uplifting Women ==
Al Ali dedicates a huge part of his label and designs to, both, art and women empowerment. He represented this in his 2019 exhibition titled Personal Revolutions in collaboration with the Atassi Foundation. The exhibition shed light on the beginnings of the women's art movement in Al Ali's home country, Syria, focusing on the role of women in the Syrian art scene.

== Collaborations ==
Throughout his career, Al Ali collaborated with several esteemed brands and designers, including the jewelry house Messika, fine jewelry brands, like Van Clef & Arpels and Bulgari, as well as the Spanish architect Carmelo Zappulla for Expo 2020.

Al Ali is also a mentor in collaboration with Dubai Design and Fashion Council (DDFC). His goal is to elevate local and regional talent in the fashion industry and foster sustainability.

== Nominations ==
Al Ali was nominated for The Business of Fashion (BoF) 500 - Class of 2023. The BoF is a live index of the 500 most influential people in the global fashion industry.

== Ard Dyar ==
Rami Al Ali launched Ard Dyar, a concept and community initiative designed to encourage open conversations with well-established Syrian figures in order to support the emerging Syrian Talend across the world, and to work on capacity building as it is a long-term investment for a thriving future.
