= Ghassan al-Sayyed Ahmed =

Syrian politician (born 1978)

- غسان السيد أحمد

Governor of Deir ez-Zor
- In office 7 January 2025 (Note: In interim capacity from 7 January 2025 until 13 March 2025) – 9 May 2026
- President: Ahmed al-Sharaa
- Preceded by: Hussein al-Salama
- Succeeded by: Ziad al-Ayesh

Deputy Governor of Deir ez-Zor
- In office December 2024 – 13 March 2025
- President: Ahmed al-Sharaa
- Governor: Hussein al-Salama; Himself (acting)

Personal details
- Born: 1978 (age 47–48) Hatla, Deir ez-Zor Governorate, Syria
- Education: University of Aleppo
- Nickname: Abu Elias (Arabic: أبو إلياس)
- Military career
- Allegiance: Syrian opposition (until 2024); Syrian Salvation Government (2017–2024); Syria (since 2024)
- Conflicts: Syrian civil war; Deir ez-Zor Governorate campaign; Siege of Deir ez-Zor (2014–2017)

Ghassan Elias al-Sayyed Ahmed (Arabic: غسان إلياس السيد أحمد) is a Syrian politician and former military soldier. He was appointed Governor of Deir ez-Zor Governorate on 13 May 2025.

== Early life and education ==
He was born in Hatla, Deir ez-Zor Governorate in 1978. He earned a law degree from the University of Aleppo in 2001, along with a diploma in international law and crime science. He is currently working on his master's thesis titled "Legal Characterization of the Crime of Siege: The Syrian Case as a Model".

== Role during the civil war ==
Upon the outbreak of the Syrian civil war in 2011, he joined the Syrian opposition early on, participating in the formation of local councils affiliated with the Syrian National Coalition, and was responsible for maintaining economic facilities in Deir ez-Zor until the Islamic State of Iraq and Syria (ISIS) took over almost all of the governorate in 2014 after defeating rival opposition factions.

He participated in fighting against the Assad regime and ISIS, and lost two of his brothers in battles against ISIS. His house in Hatla was bombed by ISIS in 2014, and he survived the siege of Deir ez-Zor.

In 2017, he worked in the Services Office of the Syrian Salvation Government (SSG), located in northwestern Syria and under control of Hay'at Tahrir al-Sham, and was a member of the Shura Council of the Eastern Province Gathering in Idlib. In 2020, he became as head of the Civil Council for Displaced Persons in the Eastern Region in the SSG.

== Post-Assad ==
After the fall of the Assad regime, he served as deputy governor of Deir ez-Zor Governorate to Hussein al-Salama. Following al-Salama's resignation on 7 January 2025, he served as interim governor, and was officially appointed governor of the province on 13 March 2025.
