= Anas Khattab =

Syrian commander and politician (born 1987)

- أنس خطّاب
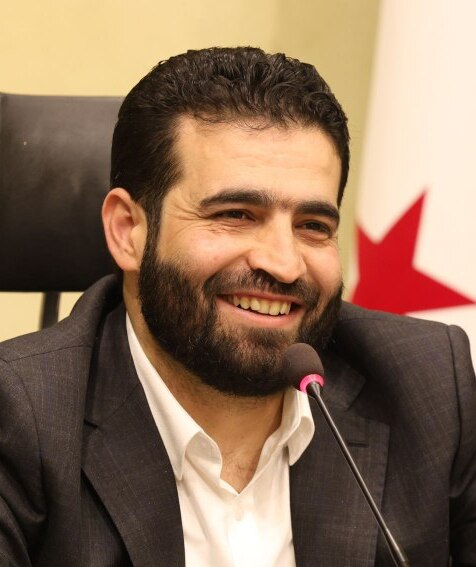
- Khattab in 2025

Minister of Interior
- Incumbent
- Assumed office 29 March 2025
- President: Ahmed al-Sharaa
- Preceded by: Ali Keda

Director of the National Security Office
- Incumbent
- Assumed office 19 July 2026
- President: Ahmed al-Sharaa
- Deputy: Hussein al-Salama
- Preceded by: Position established

Director of the General Intelligence Service
- In office 26 December 2024 – 3 May 2025
- President: Ahmed al-Sharaa
- Preceded by: Position established
- Succeeded by: Hussein al-Salama

Personal details
- Born: 7 April 1986 (age 40) Jayrud, Rif Dimashq, Syria
- Party: Independent
- Other political affiliations: Hay'at Tahrir al-Sham (until 2025)
- Education: Bachelor Degree in Architecture at Damascus University (finished at Idlib University)
- Nickname: Abu Ahmad Hudoud (Note: Arabic: أبو أحمد حدود)

Military service
- Allegiance: Formerly: Al-Qaeda (2008–2016); Al-Qaeda in Iraq (2008–2012); Al-Nusra Front (2012–2016); Jabhat Fateh al-Sham (2016–2017); Syrian Salvation Government (2017–2024); Hay'at Tahrir al-Sham (2017–2025)
- Years of service: 2008–2025
- Battles/wars: Iraq War; Syrian Civil War

Anas Hasan Khattab (Arabic: أنس حسن خطاب; born 7 April 1986), or known by his nom de guerre Abu Ahmad Hudood is a Syrian politician and former rebel commander who has served as the incumbent minister of Interior in the Syrian transitional government since 29 March 2025 and simultaneously the Director of the National Security Office since 19 July 2026.

He was the deputy commander of Hay'at Tahrir al-Sham under Ahmed al-Sharaa, and the head of the General Security Apparatus within the group.

== Early life and education ==
Anas Hasan Khattab, was born in April 1986 in the town of Jayrud, located in the western Qalamoun region of Rif Dimashq Governorate, Syria. He initially studied architectural engineering at the University of Damascus before leaving Syria for Iraq in 2008. His departure was reportedly motivated by his intent to "fight against the American occupation" during that time.

Khattab got the nickname "Abu Ahmad Hudoud" (Hudoud meaning Borders in Arabic) from his days in Al-Qaeda in Iraq under the leadership of Abu Musab al-Zarqawi, which eventually evolved into the Islamic State of Iraq. Khattab was entrusted with managing a guesthouse on the Syrian-Iraqi border that prepared fighters crossing the border.

== Career ==
=== Hay'at Tahrir al-Sham ===
Khattab joined Al-Nusra Front (later Hay'at Tahrir al-Sham) in 2012 and quickly rose through its ranks. He became known for his strategic and intelligence capabilities, playing a critical role in securing the group's dominance in the Idlib region. He was instrumental in dismantling rival factions, including Hurras al-Din, by penetrating their ranks and orchestrating precision operations.

Khattab was reportedly recruited by Turkey's National Intelligence Organization (MİT) and acted as a liaison between them and Hay'at Tahrir al-Sham after the latter took control of Idlib.

As the head of the General Security Apparatus, Khattab oversaw efforts to eliminate extremist factions such as ISIL in Idlib, employing sophisticated infiltration and rapid-response tactics. His leadership has been credited with maintaining relative stability in HTS-controlled areas.

Khattab's career within Hay'at Tahrir al-Sham included several high-profile positions:

- Former General Administrator of Jabhat al-Nusra
- Deputy to Abu Mohammad al-Julani
- Head of the General Security Apparatus

=== Syrian government ===
Khattab served as the first Director of the newly formed General Intelligence Service during the Syrian caretaker government following the fall of the Assad regime. In March 2025, Khattab, along with Syrian President al-Shaara and other senior ministers met with a Turkish delegation which included the head of Turkish intelligence. The meeting came immediately following a deal between the Syrian government and Kurdish militias in North East Syria who have clashed with Turkish forces in the past.

On 29 March 2025, Khattab was appointed Minister of Interior in the Syrian transitional government.

== Personal life ==
Khattab is reportedly multilingual and is known for his preference for operating behind the scenes. Despite his prominence, no public images of him have been released until his appointment on 26 December 2024. His professional background in architecture contrasts with the political and economic studies pursued by many of his contemporaries in Hay'at Tahrir al-Sham.

In January 2026, media reports indicated that his sister was released from detention at the Al-Hol camp in northeastern Syria, where she had allegedly been held on suspicion of links to the Islamic State. Khattab reportedly attempted to secure her release by offering a ransom through intermediaries.

On 12 February 2026, the United Nations, along with its secretary-general, said that Khattab was a target of 5 ISIL and Saraya Ansar al-Sunnah backed assassination attempts, along with foreign minister Asaad al-Shaibani and president al-Sharaa.

== Controversies ==
Khattab had faced allegations of involvement in the assassination of rival jihadist leaders via U.S. drone strikes, accusations frequently leveled by factions such as Hurras al-Din. He was designated a terrorist by the United States in 2012, and by the United Nations in 2014. The UN's designation included targeted sanctions against Khattab. After Bashar al-Assad fled Syria in December 2024, the new Syrian government of which Khattab is Interior Minister has requested that these sanctions be lifted. In November 2025, with the support of the United States and other countries, the UN Security Council lifted the sanctions against him, along with Syrian President Ahmed al-Sharaa. On 7 November, the United Kingdom announced the removal of Khattab and al-Sharaa from its sanctions list, stating that he was no longer subject to asset freezes.

The Turkish government resisted these designations until November 2016, when they too designated Khattab a terrorist, but intelligence cooperation continued and even expanded as HTS solidified its control over Idlib. Despite their intelligence cooperation, in 2021, the Turkish Interior Ministry released a report which designated Khattab as affiliated with ISIL.

In July 2026, a member of the White Helmets rescue worker group died in police custody in Syria’s Latakia province. Photos showing him receiving care at an local hospital following three days of police detention sparked claims of police brutality and calls to protest. Khattab expressed his condolences to the family and promised an investigation and justice, amidst fears that the new regime would continue like the Assad regime, who's internal security forces were notorious for torturing and killing tens of thousands in its prison system. .
