= List of universities and colleges in Syria =

This is a list of universities in Syria including public, private, military and police institutions.

== Public universities and colleges ==
As of February 2025, there are 10 public universities, 1 virtual public university, in addition to 9 higher institutes in Syria, owned by the government.

Name	Abbreviation	Location	Established
Damascus University	DU	Damascus	1923
Syrian Virtual University	SVU	Damascus	2002
University of Aleppo (Note: Since 2025, including the former Aleppo University in the Liberated Areas that was merged under the University of Aleppo. The name was set to differentiate between Aleppo University that was in the area controlled by the Assad regime forces than the one in the area controlled by the opposition forces (called "liberated areas").)	AU	Aleppo	1958
Latakia University	LU	Latakia	1971
Homs University	HU	Homs	1979
Al-Furat University	FU	Deir ez-Zor Raqqa	2006
Hama University	HU	Hama	2014
University of Tartus	UoT	Tartus	2015
Idlib University	ID	Idlib	2015
Al-Shahbaa Aleppo University		Idlib	2024
Institute of Economic and Social Planning		Damascus	1966
Higher Institute of Dramatic Arts	HIDA	Damascus	1977
Higher Institute of Applied Sciences and Technology	HIAST	Damascus	1983
Higher Institute of Music	HIM	Damascus	1990
Higher Institute of Business Administration	HIBA	Damascus	2001
National Institute of Public Administration	INA	Damascus	2002
Higher Institute of Demographic Studies and Research	HIDSR	Damascus	2003
Higher Institute of Cinematic Arts		Damascus	2021
Higher Institute of Administration		Idlib	2024

In addition to that, as of January 2026, there are 2 public universities and one academy in the areas controlled by the Democratic Autonomous Administration of North and East Syria that are owned by the Autonomous Administration (Note: See Education in the Democratic Autonomous Administration of North and East Syria for details.) but not the Syrian government.

Name	Abbreviation	Location	Established
Mesopotamian Social Sciences Academy		Qamishli	2013
University of Rojava	UoR	Qamishli	2016
University of Kobani	UoK	Kobani	2017

== Private universities ==
As of February 2025, there are 39 private universities in Syria.

Name	Abbreviation	Location	Established	Website
Arab Academy of Science and Technology and Maritime Transport		Latakia	2001	aast.edu
University of Kalamoon	UOK	Deir Atiyah, Rif Dimashq Governorate	2003	uok.edu.sy
Arab International University	AIU	Daraa Governorate	2004	aiu.edu.sy
Syrian Private University	SPU	Damascus	2005	spu.edu.sy
International University for Science and Technology	IUST	Daraa Governorate	2005	iust.edu.sy
Wadi International University	WIU	Wadi al-Nasara, Homs Governorate	2005	wiu.edu.sy
Al-Rasheed International University for Science and Technology	RU	Daraa Governorate	2007	ru.edu.sy
Yarmouk Private University	YPU	Jabab, Daraa Governorate	2008	ypu.edu.sy
Al-Wataniya Private University	WPU	Ghawr al-Assi, Hama Governorate	2006	wpu.edu.sy
Cordoba Private University	CPU	Aleppo	2003	cpu.edu.sy
Ittihad Private University	IPU	Raqqa	2003	
Al-Shahba University	SU	Aleppo	2005	su.edu.sy
Al-Jazeera Private University	JPU	Deir ez-Zor Governorate	2007	jude.edu.sy
Arab University for Science and Technology	AUST	Besirin, Hama Governorate	2007	aust.edu.sy
Al-Andalus University for Medical Sciences	AU	Tartus Governorate	2008	au.edu.sy
Al-Hawash Private University	HPU	Al-Hawash, Homs Governorate	2009	hpu.sy
Ebla Private University	EPU	Idlib Governorate	2009	ebla-uni.edu.sy
Al-Sham Private University	ASPU	Rif Dimashq Governorate	2011	aspu.edu.sy
Bilad Al-Sham University for Sharia Sciences	BAUK	Damascus	2011	shamkuftaro.org
Qasyoun Private University	QPU	Daraa Governorate	2014	qpu.edu.sy
Al-Shamal Private University	SPU	Sarmada, Idlib Governorrate	2015	https://spu-sy.org
Mari Private University	MPU	Hizano, Idlib Governorate	2015	https://mari-university.com
Al-Sham University	SHU	Azaz, Aleppo Governorate	2015	http://shamuniversity.com/
Al-Hayat University for Applied Sciences		Aqrabat, Idlib Governorate	2016	
Al-Manara University	MU	Latakia	2016	manara.edu.sy
Arab Academy for E-Businesses	ARAEB	Aleppo Governorate	2016	
Antioch Syrian University	ASU	Maarat Saidnaya, Rif Dimashq Governorate	2017	asu.edu.sy
International University for Science and Renaissance		Azaz, Aleppo Governorate	2017	
Aram University for Sciences		Azaz, Aleppo Governorate	2018	
Syrian University for Science and Technology		Azaz, Aleppo Governorate	2018	
Başakşehir University		Al-Bab, Aleppo Governorate	2021	
Al-Zahraa University	AZU	Jarabulus, Aleppo Governorate	2014	https://alzahraa.university/
Al-Maali University		Al-Bab, Aleppo Governorate	2021	
Al-Zaytuna University		Azaz, Aleppo Governorate	2021	
Al-Ruwad University for Science and Culture		Jarabulus, Aleppo Governorate	2023	
Al-Amanos University		Afrin, Aleppo Governorate	2023	
Faculty of Theology		Damascus	2021	theologyfaculty.org
Al-Maarif Private University		Idlib Governorate	2024	
The Islamic University		Idlib Governorate	2024	

== International rankings ==
These are the universities' rankings of l 2025 according to QS (Quacquarelli Symonds).

Institution	2025 (QS)
Damascus University	1201–1400

== Branches of foreign public universities ==
As of 2018, Syria has 2 branches of foreign public universities.

Name	Abbreviation	Location	Established	Website
(Sudan) Omdurman Islamic University, Damascus Branch	OIU	Damascus		oiu.edu.sd
(Arab League) Arab Academy for Science, Technology and Maritime Transport, Latakia Branch	AASTMT	Latakia	2001	aast.edu

== Military ==
As of 2018, there are 16 high military educational institutions in Syria run by the Ministry of Defense of Syria.

Name	Location	Established
National University for Defense Sciences	Damascus	2026
Higher Military Academy of Syria	Qatana, Rif Dimashq Governorate	1957
Al-Assad Military Academy	Aleppo	1979–2024
Homs Military Academy	Homs (since 1932) (women's college in al-Ghizlaniyah, Rif Dimashq, since 1987)	1919 (in Damascus)
Syrian Air Defense College	Homs (since 1974)	1958 (in Muadamiyat al-Sham)
Kuweires Military Aviation Institute	Kuweires Sharqi, Aleppo Governorate (since 1980)	1947 (in Mezzeh Air Base, Damascus)
Syrian Navy College	Latakia	1975
Bassel al-Assad College of Armored Corps	Homs (since 1972)	1952 (in Damascus)
Syrian College of Signal Corps	Homs (since 1972)	1946 (in Damascus)
Aleppo Artillery College	Aleppo (since 1970)	1954 (in Qatana)
Syrian College of Combat Engineering Corps	Al-Mushrifah, Homs Governorate (since 1978)	1954 (in Qatana)
Military College of Chemical Protection	Al-Mushrifah, Homs Governorate (since 1978)	1971 (in Aleppo)
Military College of Administrative Affairs	Masyaf, Hama Governorate (since 2012)	1974 (in Aleppo)
Military College of Technical Affairs	Homs	1952
Military College of Infantry Corps	Fafin, Aleppo Governorate	
Electronic Warfare College	Damascus	1972
Aleppo Armament College	Aleppo	

== Police ==
As of 2018, there is 1 high educational institution for police sciences in Syria run by the Syrian Ministry of Interior.

Name	Location	Established
Bassel al-Assad College of Police Sciences	Damascus	1961

== See also ==
- Education in Syria
- List of schools in Syria
- Ministry of Higher Education and Scientific Research
