= Ministry of Higher Education and Scientific Research (Syria) =

Government ministry of Syria

- وزارة التعليم العالي والبحث العلمي; Wizārat al-Taʻlīm al-ʻĀlī wa-al-Baḥth al-ʻIlmī
- Seal of the Ministry

- Headquarters of the Ministry in Damascus in October 2026

Ministry overview
- Formed: 1966, 2019 (Current form)
- Jurisdiction: Government of Syria
- Headquarters: Damascus
- Minister responsible: Marwan al-Halabi
- Website: www.mohe.gov.sy

The Ministry of Higher Education and Scientific Research (Arabic: وزارة التعليم العالي والبحث العلمي, romanized: Wizārat al-Taʻlīm al-ʻĀlī wa-al-Baḥth al-ʻIlmī) is a department of the Government of Syria that is responsible for maintaining and implementing government policies in higher education in Syria.

== History ==
The history of the ministry goes back to 1966. It was created in the name of the Ministry of Higher Education by Decree 143 issued on November 24, 1966.

As for the ministry in its current form, it was established on December 3, 2019 under Law No. 27.

== Responsibility ==
The ministry performs the following tasks:

- Proposing the general policy for the higher education sector within the higher education institutions, setting plans compatible with this policy, and supervising its implementation.
- Proposing a general policy for scientific research within the scope of higher education institutions, coordinating with research institutions affiliated with other ministries, and following up on their implementation.
- Supervising higher education and scientific research institutions affiliated with or affiliated with the Ministry.
- Proposing draft laws and regulations and issuing the necessary instructions to organize higher education institutions and the Ministry's affiliates.
- Developing the institutional and administrative work of higher education institutions.
- Proposing the creation of public and private higher education institutions.
- Securing opportunities to enroll in higher education in line with the requirements of sustainable development and societal needs.
- Providing an academic, research and social environment that supports creativity, excellence, innovation, refining talents, and supporting and encouraging cultural, artistic, social and sports activity.
- Empowering the Arabic language and working on developing its vocabulary to meet the demands of sciences and arts in a way that meets the needs of the times.
- Encouraging investment in scientific research.
- Strengthening scientific, technical and technical cooperation in the field of higher education and scientific research with countries, Arab, regional and international organizations and Arab and foreign institutions, and expanding its fields in modern and developed trends.
- Building national scientific capabilities, especially by dispatching in accordance with the provisions of the Scientific Missions Law.
- Harmonizing the outputs of higher education, development requirements and the needs of the labor market, and developing quality and accreditation standards in coordination with the concerned authorities.
- Developing postgraduate programs, specialized research centers and scientific studies centers linked to the ministry.
- Setting the necessary accreditation criteria and foundations for the recognition of non-Syrian higher education institutions and the equivalency of certificates issued by them.
- Contribute to the implementation of the state's health policy in coordination with the Ministry of Health and other ministries concerned with the health sector and adherence to the health work rules approved by the Ministry of Health.
- Follow up on the affairs of Syrian students studying outside the Syrian Arab Republic.
- Representing the Syrian Arab Republic in regional and international conferences and seminars related to higher education and scientific research.
- Organizing the affairs of international students in the Syrian Arab Republic in accordance with scientific cooperation agreements and their implementation programmes.
- Developing admission tests in educational institutions affiliated with or affiliated with the Ministry and measuring and studying the outputs of these institutions with the aim of developing the extent to which they achieve their objectives and meet the requirements of the labor market.

== Organisation ==
Organisation scheme:

Directorates of the ministry:

- Student Affairs Directorate
- Directorate of Cultural Relations
- Directorate of Equivalency of Certificates
- Administrative Development Directorate
- Directorate of Scientific Missions
- Directorate of Scientific Research
- Directorate of Planning and International Cooperation
- Directorate of Private Educational Institutions
- Quality and Accreditation Directorate
- Directorate of Educational Hospitals
- Directorate of Information and Electronic Publishing
- Directorate of Administrative Affairs
- Directorate of Information Technology and Communications
- Directorate of Educational Authority Affairs
- Engineering Affairs Directorate
- Directorate of Accounting for Scientific Missions
- Contracts Department
- Single Window Directorate
- Legal Affairs Directorate
- Department of Internal Control

=== Bodies and centers ===
- Measurement and calendar center
- Excellence and Creativity Authority
- IT Center
- National Commission for Biotechnology
- Arabic language complex
- General Authority of the Student Credit Fund

=== Teaching hospitals ===
- Al-Mouwasat University Hospital, Damascus
- Al-Assad University Hospital, Damascus
- University Children's Hospital, Damascus
- Al-Biruni University Hospital, Damascus
- University Hospital of Obstetrics and Gynecology, Damascus
- University Hospital of Dermatology and Venereology, Damascus
- University Cardiac Surgery Hospital in Damascus
- Oral and Maxillofacial University Hospital, Damascus
- Aleppo University Hospital
- Al-Kindi University Hospital, Aleppo (destroyed)
- University Hospital of Cardiology and Surgery, Aleppo
- University Hospital of Obstetrics and Gynecology in Aleppo
- Al-Assad University Hospital, Lattakia
- Tishreen University Hospital, Lattakia

=== Universities and institutes ===
- Public universities
  - Damascus University
  - University of Aleppo
  - Latakia University
  - Homs University
  - Al-Furat University
  - Syrian Virtual University
  - University of Hama
  - University of Tartus
- Private universities
  - University of Kalamoon
  - Cordoba Private University
  - Ittihad Private University
  - Arab International University
  - International University for Science and Technology
  - Syrian Private University
  - Wadi International University
  - Andalusia University for Medical Sciences
  - Al-Jazeera University
  - Al-Hawash Private University
  - Ebla Private University
  - Al-Shahba Private University
  - Yarmouk Private University
  - Arab University for Science and Technology
  - Arab Academy for Science, Technology and Maritime Transport
  - Al-Wataniya Private University
  - National Private University
  - University of the Levant for Sharia Sciences
  - Al-Rasheed International Private University for Science and Technology
  - Qasyoun Private University
  - Bilad Al-Sham University
  - Omdurman Islamic University Damascus
  - Al-Manara Private University
  - Arab Academy for E-Business
  - Antioch Syrian Private University
- Higher institutes
  - Higher Institutes of the Ministry of Higher Education:
    - Higher Institute of Dramatic Arts (HIDA)
    - Higher Institute of Music (HIM)
    - Higher Institute of Business Administration (HIBA)
    - National Institute of Public Administration (INA)
    - Higher Institute of Applied Sciences and Technology (HIAST)
    - Higher Institute of Demographic Studies and Research (HIDSR)
  - Higher Institutes of Universities:
    - University of Damascus
      - Higher Institute for Laser Research and its Applications
      - Higher Institute for Research and Seismic Studies
      - Higher Institute of Administrative Development
      - Higher Institute of Translation and Interpretation
      - Higher Institute of Languages
    - Aleppo University
      - Institute of Arab Scientific Heritage
      - Higher Institute of Languages
    - Tishreen University
      - Higher Institute of Marine Research
      - Higher Institute for Environmental Research
      - Higher Institute of Languages
    - Al-Baath University
      - Higher Institute of Language Teaching
      - Higher Institute of Water Management HIWM
    - Hama University
      - Higher Institute of Languages
- Technical institutes

=== Boards ===
- Council of Higher Education
- Supreme Council for Technical Education

== List of ministers ==
Minister	Government	Term
Minister of Higher Education
Abdullah Wathiq Shahid	Second Yusuf Zuayyin government	1966 to 1967
Mustafa al-Sayed	Second Yusuf Zuayyin government Nureddin al-Atassi government	1967 to 1969
Mustafa Haddad	Nureddin al-Atassi government	1969 to 1970
Shakir Al Faham	Hafez al-Assad government First Abdul Rahman Khalifawi government Mahmoud al-Ayyubi government	1970 to 1976
Muhammad Ali Hashem	Second Abdul Rahman Khalifawi government	1976 to 1978
Shaker El Faham	Muhammad Ali al-Halabi government	1978 to 1980
Asad Dargawi	First Abdul Rauf al-Kasm government	1980 to 1984
Ziad Shweiki	Second Abdul Rauf al-Kasm government	1984 to 1985
Kamal Sharaf	Third Abdul Rauf al-Kasm government First Mahmoud Al-Zoubi government	1985 to 1992
Salihat Sunqar	Second Mahmoud Al-Zoubi government	1992 to 2000
Hassan Risheh	First Mustafa Mero government Second Mustafa Mero government	2000 to 2003
Hani Mortada	Muhammad Naji al-Otari government	2003 to 2006
Ghiath Barakat	Muhammad Naji al-Otari government	2006 to 2011
Abdul Razzaq Sheikh Issa	Adel Safar government	2011 to 2012
Muhammad Yahya Mualla	Riyad Hijab government First Wael al-Halqi government	2012 to 2013
Malik Ali	First Wael al-Halqi government	2013 to 2014
Mohamed Amer Mardini	Second Wael al-Halqi government	2014 to 2016
Atif Naddaf	Imad Khamis government	2016 to 2018
Bassam Bashir Ibrahim	Imad Khamis government	2018 to 2019
Minister of Higher Education and Scientific Research
Bassam Bashir Ibrahim	Imad Khamis government First Hussein Arnous government Second Hussein Arnous government	2019 to 2024
Bassam Hasan	Mohammad Ghazi al-Jalali government	2024 to 2024
Abdel Moneim Abdel Hafez	Syrian caretaker government	2024 to 2025
Marwan al-Halabi	Syrian transitional government	2025 to present

== See also ==
- List of universities in Syria
- Education in Syria
