= Education in Syria =

Ministry of Education Ministry of Higher Education
- Minister of Education Minister of Higher Education: Mohammad Abdul Rahman Tarkou; Marwan al-Halabi

National education budget (2020)
- Budget: £S 32.59 billion

General details
- Primary languages: Arabic
- System type: National

Literacy (2015)
- Total: 86.4%
- Male: 91.7%
- Female: 81%

Enrollment
- Total: 800 000
- Primary: 80% (2013)
- Secondary: 78% (2012)
- Post secondary: 43%

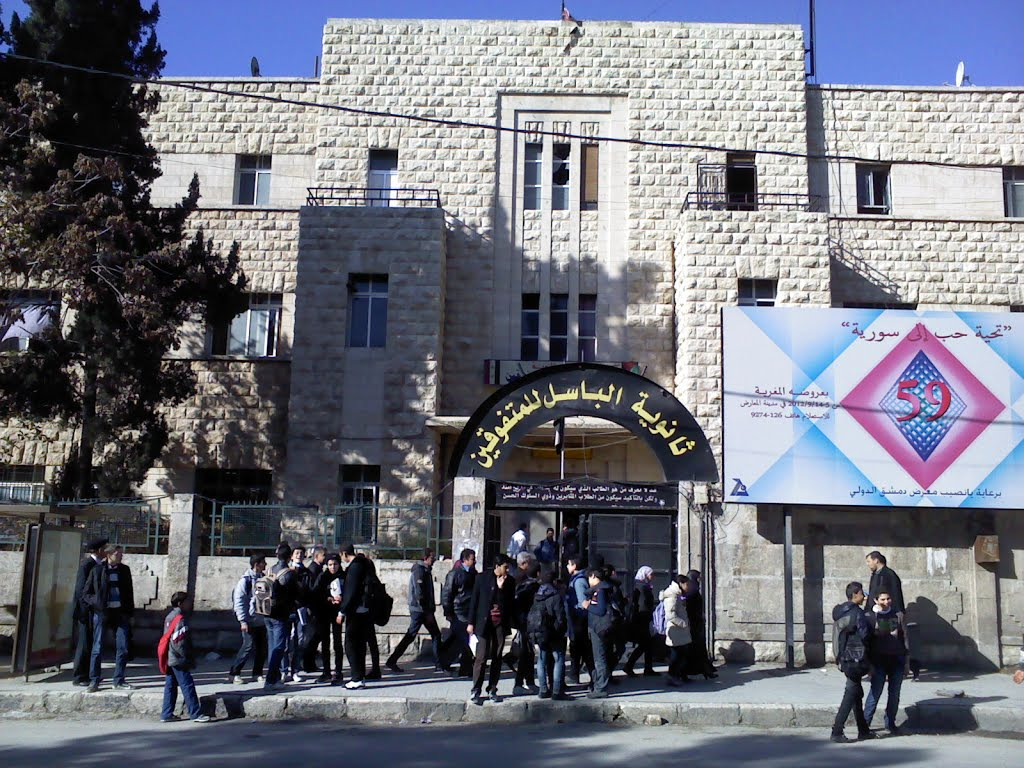
High School in Aleppo

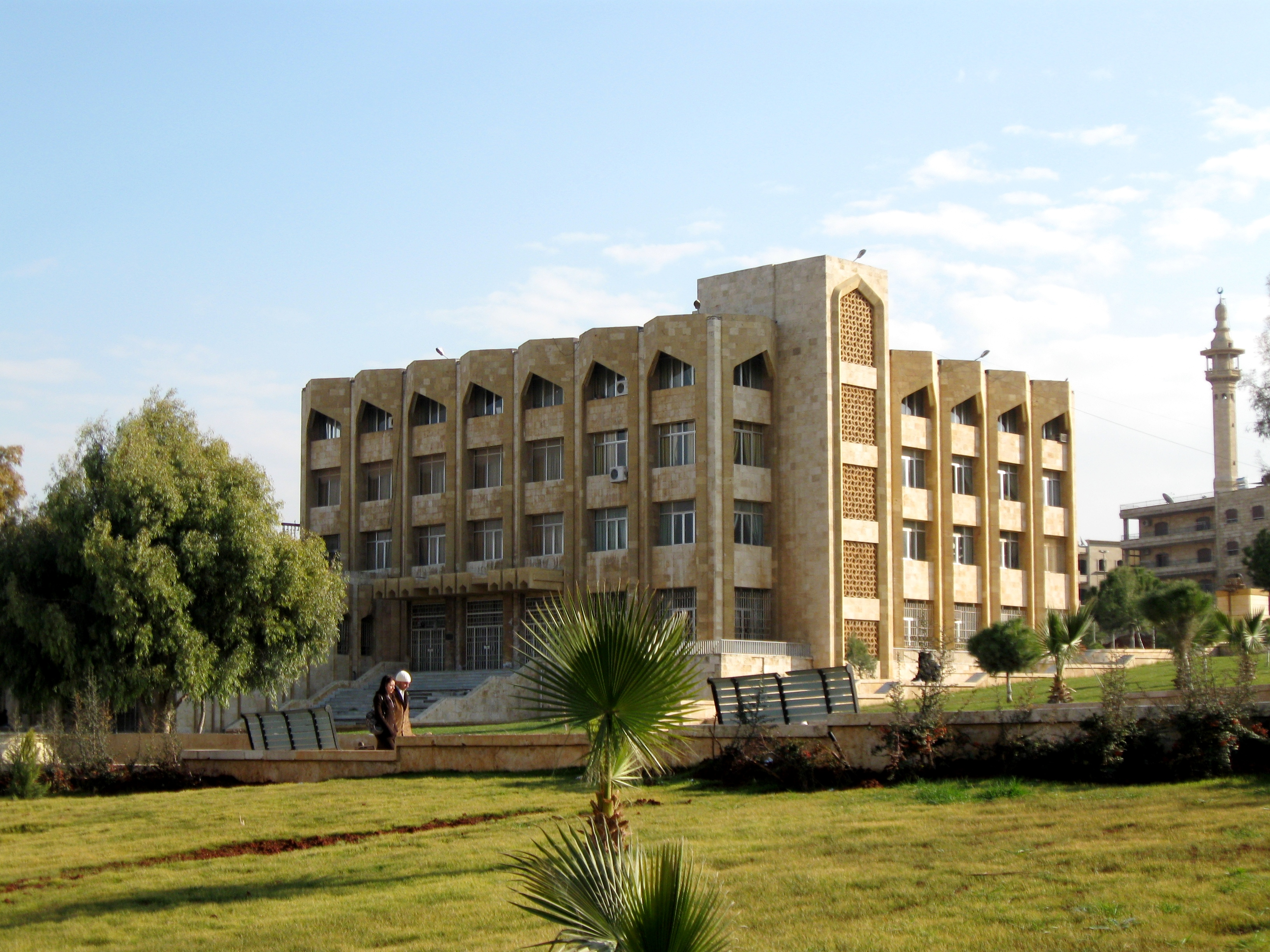
University of Aleppo

Education in the Syrian Arab Republic is given the necessary attention and care by the Syrian state, as the Constitution of Syria guarantees the right to education to every citizen, which is compulsory and free at primary level. It is free but not compulsory at the secondary level and higher education is available for a symbolic fee. the primary level includes 3 stages, 1 which include grades 1 to 6, while 2 (middle school) includes grades 7 to 9, and lastly 3 (secondary school) grades 10 to 12.

According to the 2007 census, 98 percent of schools in Syria were public (state run), 1.8 percent were private, and 0.2 percent were UNRWA schools for children who are refugees.

In 2007, there were 8 million students in the education system of Syria (4 million in basic education, 1.4 million in secondary and 2.3 million in tertiary). Given the current growth rate in the school age population, it is projected that by 2015, the education system in Syria will need to cater to an additional 1 million students in basic and secondary education.

The school system in Syria is divided into basic and secondary education levels:

- 1st to 6th grade: Primary Education Level. From 1st to 4th grade, it’s called the First Ring (Arabic: حلقة أولى; halaka oula) while 5th & 6th grade are called Second Ring (Arabic: حلقة ثانية; halaka thania)
- 7th to 9th grade: Pre-Secondary Education Level (Arabic: تعليم إعدادي; taelim 'edady )
- 10th to 12th grade: Upper Secondary Education (Arabic: تعليم ثانوي; taelim thanawi), which is the equivalent of High School.

Higher Education is the responsibility of the Ministry of Higher Education and Scientific Research.

== Early childhood care and education (ECCE) ==
The Government of Syria is also responsible for providing pre-primary or early childhood education. Up until the early 1990s, ECCE programs were provided by mostly non-governmental institutions, of which few belonged to the government sector, while others were either private or run by the Teacher's Syndicate, General Union of Workers (GUW) or the Women's Federation.

In 1990 only 5 percent of the children between the ages of 3 and 5 were enrolled in 793 kindergartens. Ten years later 7.8 percent of that age group was enrolled. Data from the Syrian Ministry of Education showed an increase in the number of kindergartens from 1096 to 1475 in 2004.

== Basic education ==
The gross enrollment rate in primary education under basic education level in 2000 was 104.3 and it has been steadily rising, reaching to about 126.24 percent in 2007. Still, the enrollment of females is lower than males. The gender parity index, ratio of female enrollment to male enrollment, since 2006 was 0.955.

The enrollment level in all programs at the lower secondary level rose significantly from early 2000, with the current gross enrollment rate of 95.3 percent.

At the secondary lower level final exams of the 9th grade are carried out nationally at the same time. The result of these exams determines if the student goes to the "general" secondary schools or the technical secondary schools. Technical secondary schools include industrial and agricultural schools for male and female students, crafts school for female students, and commercial and computer science schools for both. It is mandatory for all Syrians to attend this basic level of education.

== Secondary education ==
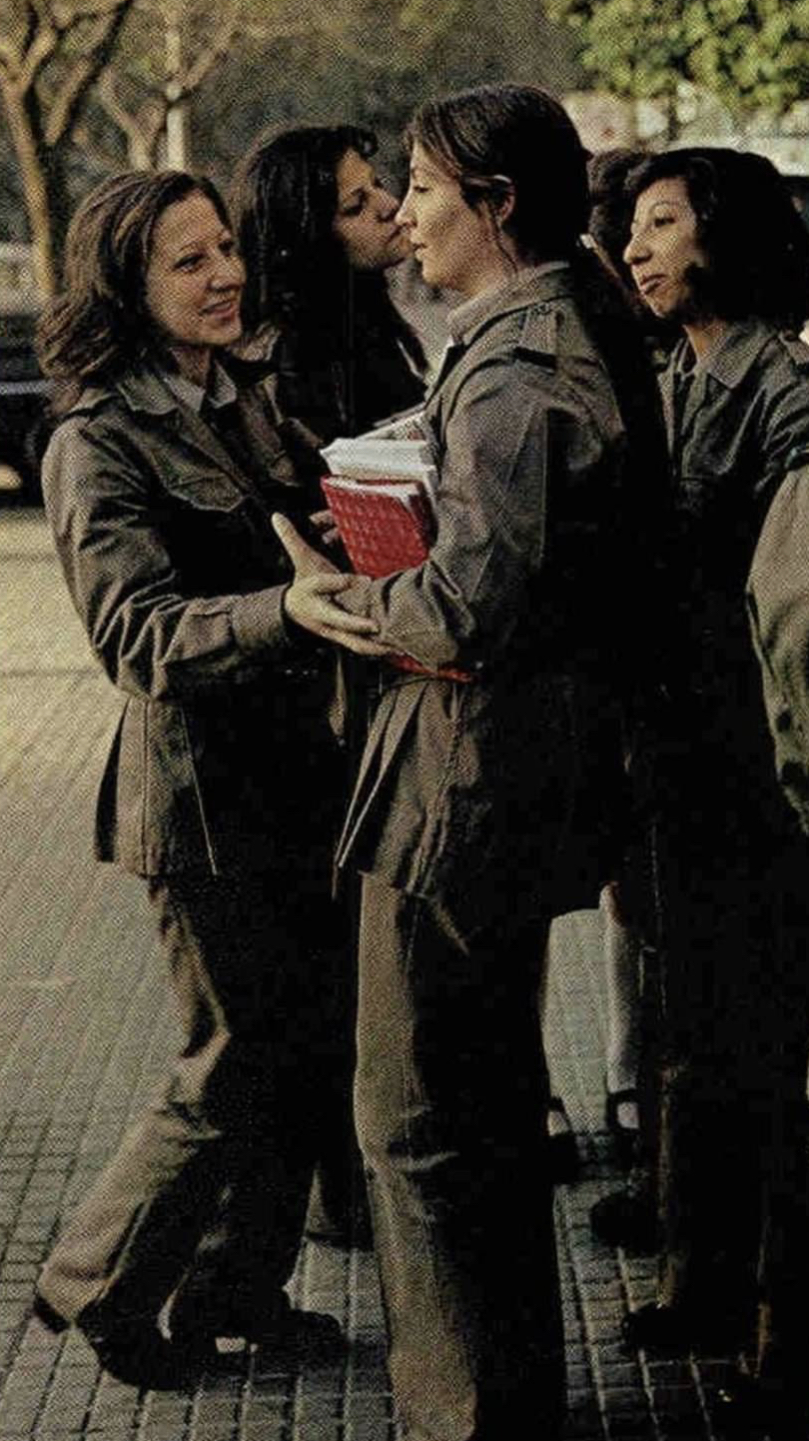
Syrian female students, 1974

The upper secondary education is for three years from grade 10 to grade 12. At the beginning of the 11th grade, those who go to "general" secondary school have to choose to continue their study in either the "literary branch" or the "scientific branch". The final exams of the 12th grade, commonly known as the Baccalauréat, are also carried out nationally and at the same time. The result of these exams determines which university, college and specialization the student attends. To do that, the student has to apply through a complicated system called "mufadalah" (Arabic: مفاضلة).

There are wide regional disparities in post-basic education. There are lower secondary and university enrollments in rural than urban areas. Even the higher income households in rural areas do not have access to post-secondary education opportunities.

The secondary gross enrollment rate in 2007 stood at 72 percent, higher than the preceding years and one percentage point higher than the 2007 MENA regional gross enrollment rate at the secondary level.

== Technical and vocational education and training (TVET) ==
At the secondary level, the education system also includes three years of general or vocational education. Syria has a relatively large proportion of secondary school students in vocational schools; about 36 percent of total secondary school students in 2004 are in vocational schools. According to UIS the total enrollment in technical and vocational education (both private and public) in 2007 decreased to 103 from 113,994 students in 2006. Out of the total number, 41898 were female students enrolled in TVET.

In 1990s, the government aimed to increase TVET enrollment and at one time decided to allocate 70 percent of the lower secondary graduates to vocational schools, which meant doubling the share of TVET in total enrollment from 20 percent in 1990 to 40 percent in 2000. However, this later proved unsustainable. Then in 2000 a new policy stipulated 50:50 distributions of secondary students between general and vocational secondary education, and this was later decreased to 40 percent. Students enrolled in four main specializations: commercial, industrial, agricultural and handicrafts. The TVET system in Syria is very rigid with no options of reentering the formal school system.

== University education ==
The earliest colleges founded in Syria were the School of Medicine (established 1903) and the Institute of Law (established 1913). The university education was founded in 1919 on a free of charge basis.

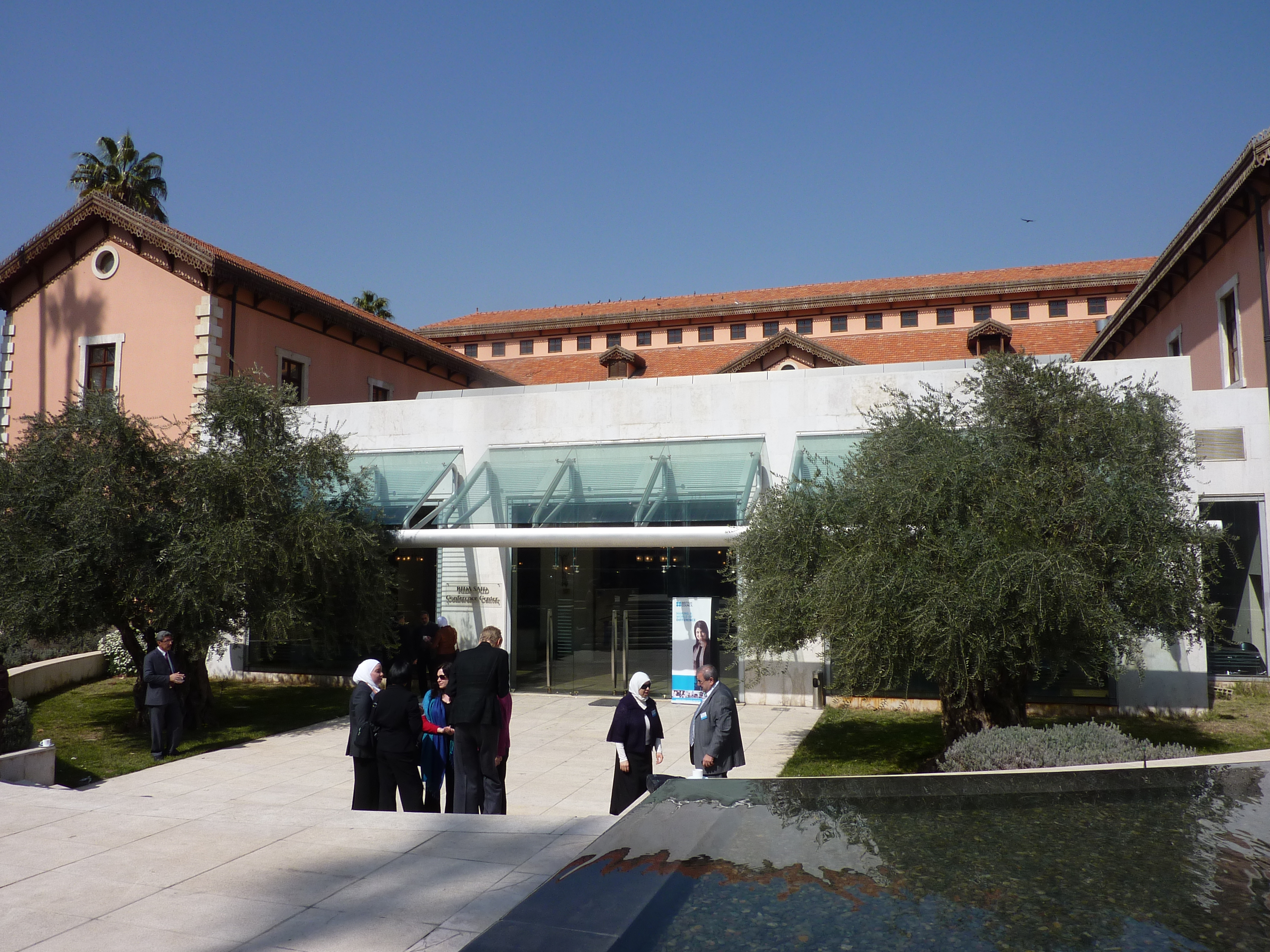
Damascus University, the oldest university in Syria

The Ministry of Higher Education was established in 1966 to supervise the scientific and educational institutions, such as universities, academic councils, the Arabic Language Academy and educational hospitals. Most post-secondary education is state-provided, but legislation passed in 2001 allows the establishment of some private universities and colleges. Resources for education have risen in absolute terms over the past decade, but it is difficult to match the rate of population growth. Colleges charge modest fees ($10–20 a year) if the student achieves the sufficient marks in their Baccalaureate exams. If not, the student may opt to pay higher fees ($1500–3000) to enroll. There are some private schools and colleges but their fees are much higher.

Domestic policies emphasize engineering and medicine in Syria’s universities, with less emphasis on the arts, law, and business. Most universities in Syria follow the French model of the high education, the university stages and the academic degrees are:

First stage: the License awarded after four to six years depending on the field.

Second stage: the DEA or DESS one to two years postgraduate degree equivalent to the master's degree in the American-English systems.

Third stage: the doctorate three to five years after the DEA or an equivalent degree.

20 private universities have been given licenses, 14 of which have actually opened and 6 to be opened soon. Private universities will have an independent academic and management structure representing the owner and will be headed by the president of the university. There will also be a university board consisting of either: chancellor, faculty or division.

=== Private universities ===
- Syrian Private University
- Al Rasheed International Private University for Science & Technology - Damascus
- International University for Sciences and Technology (IUST) - Damascus
- University of Kalamoon - Deir Atiyah
- The Arab European University - Sahnaya
- Al-Jazeera University - Deir ez-Zor
- Al-Manara University - Latakia
- Al-Andalus University - Al-Qadmus
- Al-Sham Private University - Damascus
- Arab International University (AIU) - Damascus
- International University for Science and Technology - Damascus
- Wadi International University
- Arab Academy for E-Business - Damascus

=== Public universities ===
- Damascus University in Damascus
- Aleppo University in Aleppo
- Homs University in Homs
- Hama University in Hama
- Al-Furat University in Deir ez-Zor, Raqqa and Hasakah
- Idlib University in Idlib
- Latakia University in Latakia
- University of Tartus in Tartus
- Syrian Virtual University in Damascus
- Rojava University in Qamishli

The Centre for Measurement and Evaluation in Higher Education (CME), which was established in 2012, assesses the performance of students, programs, and educational institutions. The centre was founded to set clear criteria for cross-border certificates based on the methodology, techniques and institutional standard measurement tools. its aim is to measure knowledge, skills and attitudes in a scientific way, to ensure the quality of higher education outputs to meet developmental needs.

=== Higher technical institutes ===
- Higher Institute of Marine Research
- Higher Institute of Water Resource Management
- Higher Institute of Business Administration
- Higher Institute of Applied Sciences and Technology

=== Virtual university ===
In September 2002, the first virtual university was founded, through which students can obtain degrees from international institutions. The university is called Syrian Virtual University.

=== Institution Ranking in Syria ===
The ranking of the Syrian Higher education institutions in Syria has been effected by the Syrian crisis. In the year 2023, the ranking of Damascus University within the QS Ranking has risen to become in the field 1201-1400. Several factors such as sustainable development goals-related research and citations have influenced this. The ranking of Damascus University has also increased within the Webometrics ranking linked to the university's website, to become less than 3150 in the second edition of the year 2023 of this ranking.

== Politics and religion ==
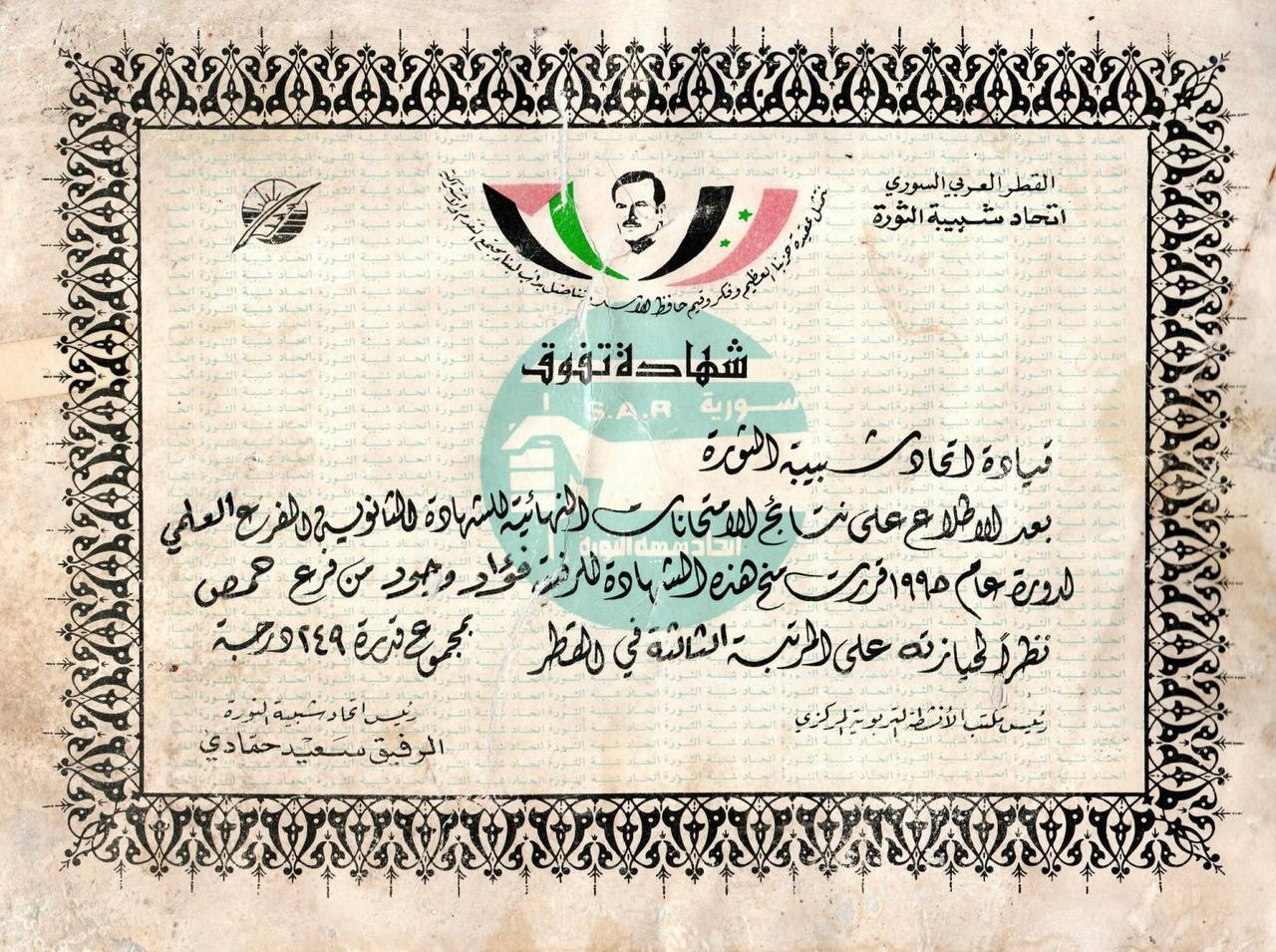
Certificate of Excellence, 1995

During the Assad era, the Arab Socialist Ba'ath Party heavily influenced the educational system in Syria, in which primary school students called "Al-Ba'ath Vanguards" (Arabic: طلائع البعث), elementary school students led by "Revolutionary Youth Union" (اتحاد شبيبة الثورة), and college students headed by "National Union of Syrian Students" (الاتحاد الوطني لطلبة سورية), learned and promoted Ba'athism, Pan-Arabism and socialist beliefs. From 1967, all schools, colleges, and universities were put under close government supervision by the Ba'ath Party.

According to the Constitution of Syria of 1973, Chapter 3: Educational and Cultural Principles, Article 21, it is written:

The educational and cultural system aims at creating a socialist nationalist Arab generation which is scientifically minded and attached to its history and land, proud of its heritage, and filled with the spirit of struggle to achieve its nation's objectives of unity, freedom, and socialism, and to serve humanity and its progress.

— Constitution of Syria of 1973,

The article was later scrapped in the new Constitution of 2012. Nevertheless, the student were taught Ba'athism through a subject known as "Political Arab Sociology".

Following the fall of Bashar al-Assad in 2024, a transitional government was put in place, and proposed changes to textbooks were announced. These included a removal of references to Bashar al-Assad, Ba'athism, removing references to pre-Islamic deities, religions and people, changes to interpretations of Quranic verses, removal of poetry about women and love, and removing references to the Big Bang theory and evolution from science classes. The subject of "National Education" was cancelled as it was seen as Assadist propaganda, and replaced with Islamic or Christian education. Syria expert Joshua Landis argued that the new textbooks were moving to an "Islamist interpretation of Syrian history". Nazir al-Qadri said that these proposed changes would not go into place until committees reviewed and scrutinised the changes, and that "what was deleted is what glorifies the former regime and its followers".

After the collapse of the al-Assad government in 2024, universities in Syria were temporarily closed due to political uncertainty. Universities were reopened in Syria in early January 2025.

== Computer literacy ==
This measure and others, such as making computer literacy mandatory at the high-school level and English- and French-language instruction compulsory in the elementary schools, have the goal of equipping students with computer and language skills in order to modernize the economy through the education system.

== Syrian civil war ==
The Syrian civil war has been a major barrier to quality education for all in Syria, reversing development gains in the country. In addition to causing widespread destruction of learning spaces, the crisis has forced more than 2.1 million children and youth out of school in Syria; an additional 3.3 million in Syria need educational assistance, and 1.4 million Syrian children and youth are refugees in the five main host countries (Egypt, Iraq, Jordan, Lebanon, and Turkey). In 2011, Syria had achieved universal primary enrolment and was near universal enrolment in lower secondary education. More concretely, 91% of primary school-aged children were in school in 2011, but by 2015 the rate had plummeted to 37%.

== See also ==
- Newcomer education
- Education in emergencies and conflict areas
- Higher education in the Arab world

== Sources ==
This article incorporates text from a free content work. Licensed under CC-BY-SA IGO 3.0 (license statement/permission). Text taken from Bridging Learning Gaps for Youth: UNESCO Regional Education Response Strategy for the Syria Crisis (2016-2017), 13-14, UNESCO.
