= List of decrees by Ahmed al-Sharaa =

These lists cover decrees issued by Ahmed al-Sharaa since his appointment as president of Syria on 29 January 2025.

Following the fall of the Assad government on 8 December 2024, leaders of the former opposition factions convened the Syrian Revolution Victory Conference in Damascus on 29 January 2025. During the conference, the Syrian General Command appointed al-Sharaa as president of Syria for the transitional period and announced the dissolution of the People's Assembly, the former Syrian Arab Army, and the Ba'ath Party, as well as the abolition of the 2012 Constitution.

Under the Constitutional Declaration, adopted on 13 March 2025, the president of Syria is empowered to issue decrees. The declaration establishes a presidential system in which executive power is vested in the president, with no provision for the office of prime minister. Unlike his predecessors under the 2012 Constitution and earlier constitutions, however, the president has no constitutional authority to issue legislative decrees. Under Article 26 of the Constitutional Declaration, legislative power is vested in the People's Assembly once it is established.

However, the People's Assembly did not convene its first session until 12 July 2026, approximately sixteen months after the Constitutional Declaration came into force. In the absence of a functioning legislature, several presidential decrees issued during this period, including Decree No. 109 of 2026, which enacted a new customs law, effectively served legislative purposes despite being formally issued as ordinary decrees rather than legislative decrees. This practice has been regarded by some as a violation of the Constitutional Declaration.

The decrees issued by President Ahmed al-Sharaa have covered routine executive and administrative matters, such as appointments, the formation of government bodies, and the ratification of agreements, as well as matters of a legislative nature during the period before the People's Assembly convened. Article 3 of the Official Gazette Law permits certain laws, decrees, and decisions to remain unpublished or to be published in abridged form for reasons of "national defence and the requirements of state security". For this reason, this list is necessarily incomplete.

Signature of Ahmad al-Sharaa

== Decrees ==
=== 2025 ===
The first eleven instruments of President al-Sharaa were issued under the title "decision" rather than "decree". From Decree No. 12 onwards, all subsequent instruments were issued as "decrees", and no decision has been issued since. For consistency, the decisions numbered 1 to 11 are included in the table below alongside the decrees.

| No. | Relative No. | Title / Description | Date issued | OG Issue | Ref. |
|---|---|---|---|---|---|
| 1 | 1 | Formation of a preparatory committee for the National Dialogue Conference | 11 February 2025 | | |
| 2 | 2 | Formation of a committee of experts to draft the Constitutional Declaration | 2 March 2025 | | |
| 3 | 3 | Formation of an independent national committee to investigate and establish the facts of the events of the Syrian coast | 9 March 2025 | | |
| 4 | 4 | Formation of a supreme committee for preserving civil peace | 9 March 2025 | | |
| 5 | 5 | Formation of the National Security Council | 12 March 2025 | | |
| – | – | Constitutional Declaration of the Syrian Arab Republic | 13 March 2025 | Part 1, Issue No. 7, Supplement, 2025 | |
| 6 | 6 | Disbursement of a one-time financial grant | 15 March 2025 | Part 1, Issue No. 7, Supplement, 2025 | |
| 7 | 7 | Appointing His Eminence Sheikh Osama al-Rifai as Grand Mufti of the Syrian Arab Republic | 28 March 2025 | Part 1, Issue No. 10, 2025 | |
| 8 | 8 | Formation of the Supreme Fatwa Council | 28 March 2025 | Part 1, Issue No. 10, 2025 | |
| 9 | 9 | Formation of the Syrian government | 29 March 2025 | Part 1, Issue No. 10, 2025 | |
| 10 | 10 | Appointing Mr Abd al-Qadir al-Husrieh as Governor of the Central Bank of Syria | 7 April 2025 | Part 1, Issue No. 10, 2025 | |
| 11 | 11 | Extension of the work of the national committee for investigation and fact-finding on the events of the coast | 10 April 2025 | Part 1, Issue No. 12, 2025 | |
| 12 | 12 | Appointing Mr Amer Namis al-Ali as head of the Central Authority for Control and Inspection | 4 May 2025 | Part 1, Issue No. 14, 2025 | |
| 13 | 13 | Formation of the Illicit Gain Combating Committee | 4 May 2025 | | |
| 14 | 14 | | | | |
| 15 | 15 | | | | |
| 16 | 16 | Cancelling all precautionary seizure decisions and their amendments issued from 2012 to 2024 | 11 May 2025 | Part 1, Issue No. 15, 2025 | |
| 16 (Note: Sic.) | 17 | Appointing Hussein Al-Khatib as Assistant Minister of Health for Health Affairs | 17 May 2025 | | |
| 17 | 18 | Appointing Mr Muhammad Rahhal as deputy to the Minister of Transport for land transport affairs | 17 May 2025 | Part 1, Issue No. 16, 2025 | |
| 18 | 19 | Changing the name of the General Authority for Planning and International Cooperation to the Planning and Statistics Authority | 17 May 2025 | Part 1, Issue No. 16, 2025 | |
| 19 | 20 | Formation of an independent body named the National Commission for Missing Persons | 17 May 2025 | Part 1, Issue No. 16, 2025 | |
| 20 | 21 | Formation of an independent body named the National Commission for Transitional Justice | 17 May 2025 | Part 1, Issue No. 16, 2025 | |
| 21 | 22 | | 17 May 2025 | | |
| 22 | 23 | | 17 May 2025 | | |
| 23 | 24 | | 17 May 2025 | | |
| 24 | 25 | | 17 May 2025 | | |
| 25 | 26 | | 17 May 2025 | | |
| 26 | 27 | | 17 May 2025 | | |
| 31 | 28 | Appointing Mr Hussein al-Khatib as deputy to the Minister of Health for health affairs | 17 May 2025 | Part 1, Issue No. 16, 2025 | |
| 27 | 29 | Appointing Mr Anas Radwan Salim as head of the Planning and Statistics Authority | 18 May 2025 | Part 1, Issue No. 17, 2025 | |
| 28 | 30 | Appointing Abdul Rahim Attoun as Head of the Advisory Office for Religious Affairs at the Presidency of the Syrian Arab Republic | 18 May 2025 | | |
| 29 | 31 | | | | |
| 30 | 32 | | | | |
| 32 | 33 | Appointing Mr Omar Muhammad Shaqrouq as deputy to the Minister of Energy for electricity affairs | 19 May 2025 | Part 1, Issue No. 19, 2025 | |
| 33 | 34 | Appointing Mr Ghiyath Fawzi Diab as deputy to the Minister of Energy for oil affairs | 19 May 2025 | Part 1, Issue No. 19, 2025 | |
| 34 | 35 | | | | |
| 35 | 36 | | | | |
| 37 | 37 | Appointing Mr Abd al-Hamid al-Khalid as deputy to the Minister of Higher Education and Scientific Research for student affairs | 25 May 2025 | Part 1, Issue No. 19, 2025 | |
| 38 | 38 | Appointing Mr Ghaith Warqouzq as deputy to the Minister of Higher Education and Scientific Research for scientific affairs and scientific research | 25 May 2025 | Part 1, Issue No. 19, 2025 | |
| 39 | 39 | Appointing Mr Muhammad Suwayd as deputy to the Minister of Higher Education and Scientific Research for private education affairs | 25 May 2025 | Part 1, Issue No. 19, 2025 | |
| 40 | 40 | Appointing Mrs Abeer Qudsi as deputy to the Minister of Higher Education and Scientific Research for administrative affairs | 25 May 2025 | Part 1, Issue No. 19, 2025 | |
| 41 | 41 | | | | |
| 36 | 42 | Appointing Mr Osama Khalid Abu Zeid as deputy to the Minister of Energy for water resources affairs | 26 May 2025 | Part 1, Issue No. 19, 2025 | |
| 42 | 43 | Formation of the service extension committee | 29 May 2025 | | |
| 43 | 44 | Formation of the committee for approving organisational structures | 29 May 2025 | | |
| 44 | 45 | Regulation of the mechanism for filling leadership posts in the state within the middle management level | 29 May 2025 | | |
| 45 | 46 | Regulation of the mechanism for filling leadership posts in the state within executive management level | 29 May 2025 | | |
| 46 | 47 | Formation of the permanent committee for sorting and distributing graduates of the National Institute of Public Administration | 31 May 2025 | Part 1, Issue No. 19, 2025 | |
| 47 | 48 | Appointing Major General Muhammad Khayr Hasan Shuaib as deputy to the Minister of Defence | 31 May 2025 | Part 1, Issue No. 19, 2025 | |
| 48 | 49 | Appointing Mr Anas al-Musa as deputy to the Minister of Awqaf for sharia education affairs | 31 May 2025 | Part 1, Issue No. 19, 2025 | |
| 49 | 50 | Appointing Mr Samer Birqdar as deputy to the Minister of Awqaf for endowment affairs | 31 May 2025 | Part 1, Issue No. 19, 2025 | |
| 50 | 51 | Appointing Mr Diaa al-Din al-Barsha as deputy to the Minister of Awqaf for religious affairs | 31 May 2025 | Part 1, Issue No. 19, 2025 | |
| 51 | 52 | Appointing Mr Mohammad Yasser Ghazal as deputy to the Minister of Local Administration and Environment for technical affairs | 31 May 2025 | | |
| 52 | 53 | Appointing Mr Zafer Mohammad al-Omar as deputy to the Minister of Local Administration and Environment for administrative affairs | 31 May 2025 | | |
| 53 | 54 | Appointing Mr Youssef Hassan Sharaf as deputy to the Minister of Local Administration and Environment for environmental affairs | 31 May 2025 | | |
| 54 | 55 | Appointing Mr Ahmad Numair Muhammad Faiz al-Sawwaf as deputy to the Minister of Culture for administrative and legal affairs | 31 May 2025 | | |
| 55 | 56 | Appointing Mrs Luna Ahmad Louay Rajab as deputy to the Minister of Culture for heritage and antiquities affairs | 31 May 2025 | Part 1, Issue No. 19, 2025 | |
| 56 | 57 | Appointing Mr Hossam Ahmad al-Hallaq as deputy to the Minister of Emergency and Disasters for planning and institutional efficiency affairs | 31 May 2025 | Part 1, Issue No. 19, 2025 | |
| 57 | 58 | Appointing Mr Omar Hussein Hammada as Head of the National Authority for Quality and Accreditation | 31 May 2025 | | |
| 58 | 59 | | 31 May 2025 | | |
| 59 | 60 | | 31 May 2025 | | |
| 60 | 61 | Appointing Mr Abdo Muhammad Bashir Mahli as deputy to the Minister of Health for pharmaceutical affairs | 31 May 2025 | Part 1, Issue No. 19, 2025 | |
| 61 | 62 | Appointing Mr Yusuf Satouf Annan as deputy to the Minister of Education for educational affairs | 31 May 2025 | Part 1, Issue No. 19, 2025 | |
| 62 | 63 | | 31 May 2025 | | |
| 63 | 64 | | 31 May 2025 | | |
| 64 | 65 | Appointing Mr Mustafa Muhammad al-Qasim as deputy to the Minister of Justice for judicial affairs | 31 May 2025 | | |
| 65 | 66 | Appointing Mr Hassan Yusuf al-Turba as Attorney General of the Syrian Arab Republic | 31 May 2025 | Part 1, Issue No. 19, 2025 | |
| 67 | 67 | | 31 May 2025 | | |
| 68 | 68 | Disbursement of a one-time financial grant to state workers on the occasion of Eid al-Adha | 31 May 2025 | | |
| 66 | 69 | Formation of a committee named the Higher Committee for People's Assembly Elections | 2 June 2025 | Part 1, Issue No. 20, 2025 | |
| 69 | 70 | Naming Minister of Finance Mr Muhammad Barnieh governor for the Syrian Arab Republic at each legal entity of the World Bank Group | 2 June 2025 | | |
| 70 | 71 | Withdrawal of the decrees of dismissal and deeming-resigned issued against certain judges and returning them to judicial work | 2 June 2025 | Part 1, Issue No. 20, 2025 | |
| 71 | 72 | Appointing Mr Abd al-Razzaq Mustafa Ka'di as President of the Council of State | 4 June 2025 | Part 1, Issue No. 19, 2025 | |
| 72 | 73 | | 4 June 2025 | | |
| 73 | 74 | Appointing Mr Ahmad Ali Mustafa as Deputy Head of the General Authority for Land and Sea Ports | 4 June 2025 | | |
| 74 | 75 | Appointing Mr Khaled Mohammad Al-Barrad as Assistant Head of the General Authority for Land and Sea Ports for Customs Affairs | 4 June 2025 | | |
| 75 | 76 | Appointing Mr Rajab Ahmad Al-Judou’ as Assistant Head of the General Authority for Land and Sea Ports for Security and Safety Affairs | 4 June 2025 | | |
| 76 | 77 | Appointing Mr Qutaiba Abdul Hamid Naji as Assistant Head of the General Authority for Land and Sea Ports | 4 June 2025 | | |
| 77 | 78 | Appointing Mr Ahmad Abdul Razzaq al-Dhamen as General Director of the Free Zones Establishment in the General Authority for Land and Sea Ports | 4 June 2025 | | |
| 79 | 79 | Referring judges to the Supreme Judicial Council | 5 June 2025 | | |
| 80 | 80 | | 5 June 2025 | | |
| 81 | 81 | Referring judges to the Supreme Judicial Council | 5 June 2025 | | |
| 82 | 82 | Referring judges to the Supreme Judicial Council | 5 June 2025 | | |
| 83 | 83 | | | | |
| 84 | 84 | | | | |
| 85 | 85 | | | | |
| 86 | 86 | | | | |
| 87 | 87 | | | | |
| 78 | 88 | Granting every farmer who delivers his wheat to the Syrian Grain Establishment an incentive reward | 11 June 2025 | Part 1, Issue No. 20, 2025 | |
| 88 | 89 | Execution of the penalty of disqualification against the judges of the abolished Counter-Terrorism Court | 11 June 2025 | | |
| 89 | 90 | | 11 June 2025 | | |
| 90 | 91 | Appointing Tariq Hossam al-Din as president of Homs University | 11 June 2025 | | |
| 91 | 92 | | 11 June 2025 | | |
| 92 | 93 | Appointing Mr Adib Mohammad Barhoum as president of University of Tartus | 11 June 2025 | | |
| 93 | 94 | Appointing Mr Munir Muhammad Shukri al-Habib al-Arid as president of the Euphrates University | 11 June 2025 | Part 1, Issue No. 24, 2025 | |
| 94 | 95 | Appointing Mr Ziyad Hasan Abboud as president of Idlib University | 11 June 2025 | Part 1, Issue No. 24, 2025 | |
| 96 | 96 | Appointing Abd al-Karim Hussein Qalb al-Louz as president of Hama University | 11 June 2025 | | |
| 95 | 97 | Allowing first-stage university and postgraduate students who were interrupted because of the revolution to submit return applications at public and private universities | 15 June 2025 | Part 1, Issue No. 21, 2025 | |
| 97 | 98 | Granting the seconded delegate one year to complete the procedures for his appointment | 15 June 2025 | Part 1, Issue No. 21, 2025 | |
| 98 | 99 | Granting a student who exhausted the failure chances in the bachelor's stage an exceptional academic year | 15 June 2025 | Part 1, Issue No. 21, 2025 | |
| 99 | 100 | The name Homs University is adopted as a government university in the Syrian Arab Republic | 15 June 2025 | Part 1, Issue No. 21, 2025 | |
| 100 | 101 | The name Latakia University is adopted as a government university in the Syrian Arab Republic | 15 June 2025 | | |
| 101 | 102 | Accepting the resignation of Mr Moataz Ibrahim Sabih Duhji, assigned to the post of deputy minister of local administration and environment | 18 June 2025 | | |
| 102 | 103 | Increase of salaries and wages for workers | 19 June 2025 | Part 1, Issue No. 21, 2025 | |
| 103 | 104 | Increase of salaries and wages for retirees | 19 June 2025 | Part 1, Issue No. 21, 2025 | |
| 104 | 105 | Appointing Mr Ahmad Muhammad al-Hasan as deputy to the Minister of Education for education affairs | 22 June 2025 | Part 1, Issue No. 25, 2025 | |
| 105 | 106 | | 22 June 2025 | | |
| 106 | 107 | | 22 June 2025 | | |
| 107 | 108 | | 22 June 2025 | | |
| 108 | 109 | | 22 June 2025 | | |
| 109 | 110 | | 22 June 2025 | | |
| 110 | 111 | | 22 June 2025 | | |
| 111 | 112 | | 22 June 2025 | | |
| 116 | 113 | | 22 June 2025 | | |
| 117 | 114 | Appointing Mr Muhammad Safwat Abd al-Hamid Raslan as director general of the Syrian Development Fund | 22 June 2025 | Part 1, Issue No. 24, 2025 | |
| 118 | 115 | Appointing Mr Talal Muhammad al-Hilali as director general of the Syrian Investment Agency | 22 June 2025 | Part 1, Issue No. 24, 2025 | |
| 119 | 116 | | | | |
| 120 | 117 | | | | |
| 121 | 118 | Tasking the Ministry of Justice with reconstituting the judicial committee responsible for adjudicating objections submitted by affected persons while the state of emergency was in effect | 23 June 2025 | | |
| 122 | 119 | | 23 June 2025 | | |
| 123 | 120 | | 23 June 2025 | | |
| 124 | 121 | | 23 June 2025 | | |
| 125 | 122 | | 23 June 2025 | | |
| 126 | 123 | | 23 June 2025 | | |
| 127 | 124 | | 23 June 2025 | | |
| 128 | 125 | | 23 June 2025 | | |
| 129 | 126 | Appointing Mr Anas Muhammad Sawwaf as deputy to the Minister of Administrative Development for human resources management affairs | 23 June 2025 | Part 1, Issue No. 24, 2025 | |
| 130 | 127 | Appointing Mr Jaber Shuaib Ismail as deputy to the Minister of Administrative Development for organisation and institutional excellence affairs | 23 June 2025 | Part 1, Issue No. 24, 2025 | |
| 112 | 128 | Establishment of an economic-type establishment called "the Development Fund" | 24 June 2025 | Part 1, Issue No. 24, 2025 | |
| 113 | 129 | Establishment of an economic-type establishment called "the Sovereign Fund" | 24 June 2025 | Part 1, Issue No. 24, 2025 | |
| 114 | 130 | Amendment of articles of Law No. 18 of 2021 | 24 June 2025 | Part 1, Issue No. 24, 2025 | |
| 115 | 131 | Formation of the Supreme Council for Economic Development | 24 June 2025 | | |
| 131 | 132 | Appointing Mr Mustafa Saem Al-Dahr as President of Damascus University | 24 June 2025 | | |
| 132 | 133 | | | | |
| 133 | 134 | | | | |
| 134 | 135 | Attaching certain establishments to the Minister of Public Works and Housing | 26 June 2025 | Part 1, Issue No. 39, 2025 | |
| 135 | 136 | | | | |
| 136 | 137 | Appointing Mr Omar Hisham al-Husrieh as head of the General Authority for Civil Aviation | 22 July 2025 | Part 1, Issue No. 26, 2025 | |
| 137 | 138 | Tasking Dr Shadi al-Azma with heading the Excellence and Creativity Authority | 22 July 2025 | | |
| 138 | 139 | | | | |
| 139 | 140 | | | | |
| 140 | 141 | | | | |
| 141 | 142 | Exempting electricity subscribers from the financial and administrative fees stated in collection bills | 16 August 2025 | Part 1, Issue No. 29, 2025 | |
| 142 | 143 | Appointing Mr Ibrahim Abdul Malik al-Ulabi as Ambassador Extraordinary and Plenipotentiary and Permanent Representative of Syria to the United Nations | 19 August 2025 | | |
| 143 | 144 | Electoral system for People's Assembly members | 19 August 2025 | Part 1, Issue No. 30, 2025 | |
| 144 | 145 | Appointing Mr Muhammad Ahmad Zafran as deputy to the Minister of Digital Media and Development | 23 August 2025 | Part 1, Issue No. 33, 2025 | |
| 145 | 146 | Appointing Mr Abdullah Musa al-Musa as deputy to the Minister of Information for content affairs | 23 August 2025 | Part 1, Issue No. 33, 2025 | |
| 146 | 147 | Appointing Mr Ibada Ahmad Tariq Kuman as deputy to the Minister of Information for press affairs and government media | 23 August 2025 | Part 1, Issue No. 33, 2025 | |
| 147 | 148 | | | | |
| 148 | 149 | Formation of the Supreme Council for Education | 25 August 2025 | | |
| 149 | 150 | Formation of the committee of the National Commission for Transitional Justice | 25 August 2025 | Part 1, Issue No. 32, 2025 | |
| 150 | 151 | Establishment of the Ministry of Energy in the Syrian Arab Republic | 25 August 2025 | Part 1, Issue No. 32, 2025 | |
| 151 | 152 | | | | |
| 152 | 153 | | | | |
| 153 | 154 | | | | |
| 154 | 155 | | | | |
| 155 | 156 | | | | |
| 156 | 157 | | | | |
| 157 | 158 | | | | |
| 158 | 159 | | | | |
| 159 | 160 | | | | |
| 160 | 161 | | | | |
| 161 | 162 | | | | |
| 162 | 163 | | | | |
| 163 | 164 | | | | |
| 164 | 165 | | | | |
| 165 | 166 | | | | |
| 166 | 167 | | | | |
| 167 | 168 | | | | |
| 168 | 169 | | | | |
| 169 | 170 | | | | |
| 170 | 171 | | | | |
| 171 | 172 | | | | |
| 172 | 173 | | | | |
| 173 | 174 | | | | |
| 174 | 175 | Authorising the Minister of Education to licence private international educational institutions | 28 August 2025 | Part 1, Issue No. 32, 2025 | |
| 175 | 176 | Establishment of a public company called the General Company for Electricity Generation in Deir Ali | 2 September 2025 | Part 1, Issue No. 32, 2025 | |
| 176 | 177 | | 2 September 2025 | | |
| 177 | 178 | | 2 September 2025 | | |
| 178 | 179 | | 2 September 2025 | | |
| 179 | 180 | | 2 September 2025 | | |
| 180 | 181 | | 2 September 2025 | | |
| 181 | 182 | | 2 September 2025 | | |
| 182 | 183 | Establishment of the General Establishment for Blood Banks in the Syrian Arab Republic | 2 September 2025 | Part 1, Issue No. 33, 2025 | |
| 183 | 184 | Appointing Mr Haitham Fayez Bakour as director general of the General Establishment for the Euphrates Dam | 2 September 2025 | Part 1, Issue No. 33, 2025 | |
| 184 | 185 | Appointing Mr Siraj Munir al-Hariri as director general of the Public Establishment for Geology and Mineral Resources | 2 September 2025 | Part 1, Issue No. 33, 2025 | |
| 185 | 186 | | | | |
| 186 | 187 | Appointing Amjad Muhammad Hisham Nakhal as assistant to the head of the General Authority for Civil Aviation and Air Transport | 20 September 2025 | | |
| 187 | 188 | Appointing Mr Abd al-Bari Muhammad al-Sajj as assistant to the head of the General Authority for Civil Aviation and Air Transport for administrative and financial affairs | 20 September 2025 | Part 1, Issue No. 36, 2025 | |
| 188 | 189 | Determination of the official holidays | 29 September 2025 | Part 1, Issue No. 37, 2025 | |
| 189 | 190 | Establishment of the Syrian Petroleum Company in the Syrian Arab Republic | 29 September 2025 | Part 1, Issue No. 36, 2025 | |
| 190 | 191 | Appointing Mr Abd al-Karim Idris as director general of the General Directorate of Real Estate Affairs | 29 September 2025 | Part 1, Issue No. 36, 2025 | |
| 191 | 192 | Tasking Dr Ibada Muhammad al-Tamer with heading the Virtual University | 29 September 2025 | | |
| 192 | 193 | Granting university students an administrative promotion | 29 September 2025 | | |
| 193 | 194 | Idlib University is deemed established as of 2 August 2015 | 29 September 2025 | Part 1, Issue No. 36, 2025 | |
| 194 | 195 | Idlib University Hospital is deemed established as of 21 January 2020 | 29 September 2025 | Part 1, Issue No. 36, 2025 | |
| 195 | 196 | Merger of the faculties of University of Aleppo in the liberated areas into University of Aleppo | 29 September 2025 | Part 1, Issue No. 36, 2025 | |
| 196 | 197 | Cancelling the Idlib branch of University of Aleppo established by Decree No. 139 of 2008 | 29 September 2025 | Part 1, Issue No. 36, 2025 | |
| 197 | 198 | Cancelling the assignment of the post of deputy minister of petroleum to Ahmad al-Shammat | 29 September 2025 | | |
| 198 | 199 | Cancelling the assignment of the post of deputy minister of water resources to Hamdi al-Fattal | 29 September 2025 | | |
| 199 | 200 | Cancelling the assignment of the post of deputy minister of petroleum to Farhat Abdullah | 29 September 2025 | | |
| 200 | 201 | Cancelling the assignment of the post of deputy minister of water resources to Jihad Kanaan | 29 September 2025 | | |
| 201 | 202 | Cancelling the assignment of the post of deputy minister of electricity to Adham Blan | 29 September 2025 | | |
| 202 | 203 | | | | |
| 203 | 204 | | | | |
| 204 | 205 | | | | |
| 205 | 206 | | | | |
| 206 | 207 | | | | |
| 207 | 208 | | | | |
| 208 | 209 | | | | |
| 209 | 210 | | | | |
| 210 | 211 | | | | |
| 211 | 212 | | | | |
| 212 | 213 | | | | |
| 213 | 214 | Establishment of the General Authority for Civil Aviation and Air Transport | 7 October 2025 | | |
| 214 | 215 | Establishment of the Syrian Aviation Holding Company in the Syrian Arab Republic | 7 October 2025 | Part 1, Issue No. 1, 2026 | |
| 215 | 216 | | | | |
| 216 | 217 | | | | |
| 217 | 218 | | | | |
| 218 | 219 | | | | |
| 219 | 220 | | | | |
| 220 | 221 | | | | |
| 221 | 222 | | | | |
| 222 | 223 | | | | |
| 223 | 224 | | | | |
| 224 | 225 | | | | |
| 225 | 226 | | | | |
| 226 | 227 | | | | |
| 227 | 228 | | | | |
| 228 | 229 | | | | |
| 229 | 230 | | | | |
| 230 | 231 | | | | |
| 231 | 232 | | | | |
| 232 | 233 | | | | |
| 233 | 234 | | | | |
| 234 | 235 | | | | |
| 235 | 236 | | | | |
| 236 | 237 | | | | |
| 237 | 238 | | | | |
| 238 | 239 | | | | |
| 239 | 240 | | | | |
| 240 | 241 | | | | |
| 241 | 242 | | | | |
| 242 | 243 | | | | |
| 243 | 244 | | | | |
| 244 | 245 | Establishment of the General Authority for Border Crossings and Customs in the Syrian Arab Republic | 12 November 2025 | Part 1, Issue No. 44, 2025 | |
| 245 | 246 | | 12 November 2025 | | |
| 246 | 247 | | 12 November 2025 | | |
| 247 | 248 | | 12 November 2025 | | |
| 248 | 249 | | 12 November 2025 | | |
| 249 | 250 | | 12 November 2025 | | |
| 250 | 251 | | 12 November 2025 | | |
| 251 | 252 | | 12 November 2025 | | |
| 252 | 253 | | 12 November 2025 | | |
| 253 | 254 | | 12 November 2025 | | |
| 254 | 255 | | 12 November 2025 | | |
| 255 | 256 | | 12 November 2025 | | |
| 256 | 257 | | 12 November 2025 | | |
| 257 | 258 | | 12 November 2025 | | |
| 258 | 259 | | 12 November 2025 | | |
| 259 | 260 | | 12 November 2025 | | |
| 260 | 261 | | 12 November 2025 | | |
| 261 | 262 | | 12 November 2025 | | |
| 262 | 263 | | 12 November 2025 | | |
| 263 | 264 | Formation of the National Committee for Import and Export | 12 November 2025 | Part 1, Issue No. 45, 2025 | |
| 264 | 265 | Appointing Mr Qutaiba Ahmad Badawi as head of the General Authority for Border Crossings and Customs with the rank of minister | 23 November 2025 | Part 1, Issue No. 44, 2025 | |
| 265 | 266 | Appointing Mr Khaled Mohammad Al-Barrad as assistant head of the General Authority for Border Crossings and Customs for customs affairs | 23 November 2025 | | |
| 266 | 267 | Appointing Mr Ahmad Ali Mustafa as assistant head of the General Authority for Border Crossings and Customs for maritime affairs | 23 November 2025 | | |
| 267 | 268 | | | | |
| 268 | 269 | Appointing Muhammad Abd al-Halim Abazeid as deputy to the Minister of Finance | 25 November 2025 | | |
| 269 | 270 | Appointing Imad Hamad al-Masri as deputy to the Minister of Public Works and Housing for planning and studies affairs | 25 November 2025 | | |
| 270 | 271 | Appointing Maher Jamil Khalouf as deputy to the Minister of Public Works and Housing for technical affairs | 25 November 2025 | | |
| 271 | 272 | Appointing Mr Wahid Muhammad Majid Obeid as deputy to the Minister of Public Works and Housing for administrative and investment affairs | 25 November 2025 | Part 1, Issue No. 46, 2025 | |
| 272 | 273 | | | | |
| 273 | 274 | | | | |
| 274 | 275 | | | | |
| 275 | 276 | Exempting taxpayers from tax interest, penalties, and fines for 2024 and earlier | 7 December 2025 | Part 1, Issue No. 46, 2025 | |
| 276 | 277 | | | | |
| 277 | 278 | | | | |
| 278 | 279 | | | | |
| 279 | 280 | | | | |
| 280 | 281 | Establishment of an "Inspection Department" in the General Authority for Border Crossings and Customs | 16 December 2025 | | |
| 281 | 282 | Appointing Ibrahim al-Adhan as deputy to the Minister of Energy for planning and institutional excellence | 16 December 2025 | | |
| 282 | 283 | | | | |
| 283 | 284 | | | | |
| 284 | 285 | | | | |
| 285 | 286 | | | | |
| 286 | 287 | | | | |
| 287 | 288 | | | | |
| 288 | 289 | | | | |
| 289 | 290 | | | | |
| 290 | 291 | | | | |
| 291 | 292 | | | | |
| 292 | 293 | | | | |
| 293 | 294 | Replacing the old Syrian currency with the new Syrian currency | 24 December 2025 | Part 1, Issue No. 47, Supplement, 2025 | |
| 294 | 295 | | | | |
| 295 | 296 | | | | |
| 296 | 297 | | | | |
| 297 | 298 | Appointing Omar Hisham al-Husrieh as head of the General Authority for Civil Aviation and Air Transport | 29 December 2025 | | |
| 298 | 299 | Appointing Sameh Muhammad al-Khalid Arabi as assistant to the head of the General Authority for Civil Aviation and Air Transport | 30 December 2025 | | |

=== 2026 ===
| No. | Relative No. | Title / Description | Date issued | OG Issue | Ref. |
|---|---|---|---|---|---|
| 1 | 300 | | | | |
| 2 | 301 | | | | |
| 3 | 302 | | | | |
| 4 | 303 | | | | |
| 5 | 304 | | | | |
| 6 | 305 | | | | |
| 7 | 306 | | | | |
| 8 | 307 | | | | |
| 9 | 308 | | | | |
| 10 | 309 | Appointing Major General Abd al-Qadir al-Tahhan as deputy to the Minister of Interior | 8 January 2026 | | |
| 11 | 310 | | | | |
| 12 | 311 | | | | |
| 13 | 312 | Granting Syrian nationality to citizens of Kurdish origin | 16 January 2026 | Part 1, Issue No. 3, 2026 | |
| 14 | 313 | | | | |
| 15 | 314 | | | | |
| 16 | 315 | | | | |
| 17 | 316 | | | | |
| 18 | 317 | | | | |
| 19 | 318 | | | | |
| 20 | 319 | | | | |
| 21 | 320 | | | | |
| 22 | 321 | | | | |
| 23 | 322 | | | | |
| 24 | 323 | | | | |
| 25 | 324 | | | | |
| 26 | 325 | | | | |
| 27 | 326 | | | | |
| 28 | 327 | | | | |
| 29 | 328 | Exempting employers insured with the General Establishment for Social Insurance from the interest and fines owed by them if paid within one year from the effective date of this decree | 3 February 2026 | Part 1, Issue No. 7, 2026 | |
| 30 | 329 | Appointing Nour al-Din Ahmad Issa as governor of Hasakah | 12 February 2026 | | |
| 31 | 330 | | 12 February 2026 | | |
| 32 | 331 | | 12 February 2026 | | |
| 33 | 332 | | 12 February 2026 | | |
| 34 | 333 | | 12 February 2026 | | |
| 35 | 334 | | 12 February 2026 | | |
| 36 | 335 | Formation of the National Committee for Crescent Moon Sighting | 12 February 2026 | Part 1, Issue No. 8, 2026 | |
| 37 | 336 | | 12 February 2026 | | |
| 38 | 337 | | 12 February 2026 | | |
| 39 | 338 | Granting a general amnesty | 12 February 2026 | Part 1, Issue No. 8, 2026 | |
| 40 | 339 | | | | |
| 41 | 340 | | | | |
| 42 | 341 | | | | |
| 43 | 342 | | | | |
| 44 | 343 | Establishment of the Syrian Mining Company | 17 February 2026 | Part 1, Issue No. 16, 2026 | |
| 45 | 344 | Establishment of the Syrian Electricity Company | 17 February 2026 | Part 1, Issue No. 16, 2026 | |
| 46 | 345 | Establishment of the General Establishment for Drinking Water and Sanitation | 17 February 2026 | Part 1, Issue No. 16, 2026 | |
| 47 | 346 | | | | |
| 48 | 347 | | | | |
| 49 | 348 | | | | |
| 50 | 349 | Establishment of the Faculty of Law at the Euphrates University / Raqqa branch | 22 February 2026 | Part 1, Issue No. 9, 2026 | |
| 51 | 350 | Establishment of the Faculty of Economics at the Euphrates University / Raqqa branch | 22 February 2026 | Part 1, Issue No. 9, 2026 | |
| 52 | 351 | Establishment of faculties at the University of Aleppo in Manbij city | 22 February 2026 | Part 1, Issue No. 9, 2026 | |
| 53 | 352 | | 22 February 2026 | | |
| 54 | 353 | | 22 February 2026 | | |
| 55 | 354 | Regulation of the work of private security companies | 22 February 2026 | Part 1, Issue No. 13, 2026 | |
| 56 | 355 | | | | |
| 57 | 356 | | | | |
| 58 | 357 | | | | |
| 59 | 358 | Formation of a committee to work on preparing the destroyed areas | 8 March 2026 | Part 1, Issue No. 13, 2026 | |
| 60 | 359 | | | | |
| 61 | 360 | | | | |
| 62 | 361 | | | | |
| 63 | 362 | Establishment of the General Authority for Logistics and Supply in the Syrian Arab Republic | 10 March 2026 | Part 1, Issue No. 14, 2026 | |
| 64 | 363 | | | | |
| 65 | 364 | Appointing Mr Abd al-Razzaq Omar al-Masri as director general of the General Authority for Logistics and Supply | 14 March 2026 | Part 1, Issue No. 14, 2026 | |
| 66 | 365 | | | | |
| 67 | 366 | Increase of lump-sum salaries and wages by /50%/ | 18 March 2026 | Part 1, Issue No. 14, 2026 | |
| 68 | 367 | Qualitative increase regulation applied to certain public bodies | 18 March 2026 | Part 1, Issue No. 14, 2026 | |
| 69 | 368 | Formation of a committee to determine the total or partial destruction of the fixed assets of commercial, industrial and tourist establishments | 18 March 2026 | Part 1, Issue No. 14, 2026 | |
| 70 | 369 | Applying the pillars of settling distressed debts and credit facilities at public banks and granting exemptions from late-payment and contractual interest and fines | 18 March 2026 | Part 1, Issue No. 14, 2026 | |
| 71 | 370 | | | | |
| 72 | 371 | | | | |
| 73 | 372 | | | | |
| 74 | 373 | Establishment of the Faculty of Architecture at the Euphrates University | 5 April 2026 | Part 1, Issue No. 17, 2026 | |
| 75 | 374 | Establishment of the Faculty of Informatics Engineering at the Euphrates University | 5 April 2026 | Part 1, Issue No. 17, 2026 | |
| 76 | 375 | | | | |
| 77 | 376 | | | | |
| 78 | 377 | | | | |
| 79 | 378 | | | | |
| 80 | 379 | | | | |
| 81 | 380 | | | | |
| 82 | 381 | | | | |
| 83 | 382 | | | | |
| 84 | 383 | | | | |
| 85 | 384 | | | | |
| 86 | 385 | | | | |
| 87 | 386 | Granting an exceptional examination session to Syrian students participating in international olympiads | 14 April 2026 | | |
| 88 | 387 | | | | |
| 89 | 388 | | | | |
| 90 | 389 | | | | |
| 91 | 390 | | | | |
| 92 | 391 | | | | |
| 93 | 392 | | | | |
| 94 | 393 | | | | |
| 95 | 394 | Appointing Osama Abu Zeid as deputy to the Minister of Energy for water and electricity affairs | 3 May 2026 | | |
| 96 | 395 | Appointing Engineer Omar Muhammad Shaqrouq as chief executive of the Syrian Electricity Company | 3 May 2026 | | |
| 97 | 396 | | | | |
| 98 | 397 | Appointing Abd al-Rahman Badr al-Din al-Amma as Secretary General of the Presidency of the Republic | 9 May 2026 | | |
| 99 | 398 | Appointing Muhammad Safwat Raslan as Governor of the Central Bank of Syria | 9 May 2026 | | |
| 100 | 399 | Appointing Khalid Fawaz Zaarour as Minister of Information | 9 May 2026 | | |
| 101 | 400 | Appointing Basel Hafez al-Suwaidan as Minister of Agriculture | 9 May 2026 | | |
| 102 | 401 | Appointing Ghassan Elias al-Sayyid Ahmad as governor of Quneitra Governorate | 9 May 2026 | | |
| 103 | 402 | Appointing Murhaf Khalid al-Nuasan as governor of Homs Governorate | 9 May 2026 | | |
| 104 | 403 | Appointing Ahmad Mustafa as governor of Latakia Governorate | 9 May 2026 | | |
| 105 | 404 | Appointing Ziyad Fawaz al-Ayesh as governor of Deir ez-Zor Governorate | 9 May 2026 | | |
| 106 | 405 | | | | |
| 117 | 406 | Exempting customs violations from fines, fees, and taxes | 11 May 2026 | | |
| 107 | 407 | Reconstitution of the National Committee for Import and Export | 17 May 2026 | | |
| 108 | 408 | | 17 May 2026 | | |
| 109 | 409 | Customs Law | 17 May 2026 | | |
| 110 | 410 | Harmonised Customs Tariff schedule | 18 May 2026 | | |
| 111 | 411 | | 18 May 2026 | | |
| 112 | 412 | | 18 May 2026 | | |
| 113 | 413 | | 18 May 2026 | | |
| 114 | 414 | | 18 May 2026 | | |
| 115 | 415 | | 18 May 2026 | | |
| 116 | 416 | | 18 May 2026 | | |
| 118 | 417 | Appointing Tamim Sawaghi as assistant to the head of the General Authority for Border Crossings and Customs for border crossings affairs | 18 May 2026 | | |
| 119 | 418 | Appointing Wasim al-Mansour as assistant to the head of the Authority for Border Crossings and Customs for financial and administrative affairs | 18 May 2026 | | |
| 120 | 419 | Granting 9,000 new pounds for every ton of wheat that farmers deliver to the Syrian Grain Establishment | 18 May 2026 | | |
| 121 | 420 | | | | |
| 122 | 421 | | | | |
| 123 | 422 | | | | |
| 124 | 423 | | | | |
| 125 | 424 | | | | |
| 126 | 425 | | | | |
| 127 | 426 | | | | |
| 128 | 427 | | | | |
| 129 | 428 | | | | |
| 130 | 429 | | | | |
| 131 | 430 | | | | |
| 132 | 431 | | | | |
| 133 | 432 | | | | |
| 134 | 433 | | | | |
| 135 | 434 | Granting pensioners an increase of 30 percent | 25 May 2026 | | |
| 136 | 435 | | | | |
| 137 | 436 | | | | |
| 138 | 437 | | | | |
| 139 | 438 | | | | |
| 140 | 439 | | | | |
| 141 | 440 | | | | |
| 142 | 441 | | | | |
| 147 | 442 | Establishment of the National University for Defence Sciences | 29 June 2026 | | |
| 143 | 443 | Naming the members of the People's Assembly | 1 July 2026 | | |
| 144 | 444 | | 1 July 2026 | | |
| 145 | 445 | | 1 July 2026 | | |
| 146 | 446 | Establishment of the Syrian University for Security Sciences | 1 July 2026 | | |
| 148 | 447 | | | | |
| 149 | 448 | Appointing the president and members of the Supreme Constitutional Court and determining their tasks | 5 July 2026 | | |
| 150 | 449 | | | | |
| 151 | 450 | | | | |
| 152 | 451 | | | | |
| 153 | 452 | | | | |
| 154 | 453 | Appointing Muhammad Wael al-Khalid as president of the National University for Defence Sciences | 16 July 2026 | | |
| 155 | 454 | | | | |
| 156 | 455 | | | | |
| 157 | 456 | | | | |
| 158 | 457 | | | | |
| 159 | 458 | | | | |
| 160 | 459 | | | | |
| 161 | 460 | | | | |
| 162 | 461 | Appointing Ahmad Rawad Ramadan as director general of the Investment Authority | 3 August 2026 | | |
| 163 | 462 | Granting students of Suwayda an exceptional session for the basic education and general secondary examinations | 17 August 2026 | | |
| 164 | 463 | Appointing Mustafa Khalil Abdi as adviser at the Presidency of the Republic | 27 August 2026 | | |
| 165 | 464 | Appointing Dr Abd al-Razzaq Muhammad al-Hussein as president of the Syrian University for Security Sciences | 5 September 2026 | | |
| 166 | 465 | | | | |
| 167 | 466 | Granting Syrian university students an administrative promotion and a supplementary examination session for the 2025–2026 academic year | 7 September 2026 | | |
| 168 | 467 | | | | |
| 169 | 468 | | | | |
| 170 | 469 | | | | |
| 171 | 470 | | | | |
| 172 | 471 | | | | |
| 173 | 472 | | | | |
| 174 | 473 | | | | |
| 175 | 474 | Appointing judges | 20 September 2026 | | |
| 176 | 475 | Appointing Nabras Muhammad Wahid Khayyata as first deputy governor of the Central Bank of Syria | 20 September 2026 | | |
| 177 | 476 | | | | |
| 178 | 477 | | | | |
| 179 | 478 | | | | |
| 180 | 479 | Granting an additional academic year to students who have exhausted their allowed attempts at repeating a year and sitting exams | 1 October 2026 | | |
| 181 | 480 | Appointing Mohammad Ghaith Barhani as Assistant Minister of Education for Vocational Education Affairs | 1 October 2026 | | |
| 182 | 481 | | | | |
| 183 | 482 | Establishing the “National Advanced Technology Track” | 4 October 2026 | | |
| 184 | 483 | | | | |
| 185 | 484 | | | | |
| 186 | 485 | | | | |
| 187 | 486 | | | | |
| 188 | 487 | Amending certain items of the customs tariff schedule | 11 October 2026 | | |
| 189 | 488 | Appointment of Basel Abdul Aziz Abdul Hannan as Minister of Industry, Internal Trade and Consumer Protection | 18 October 2026 | | |
| 190 | 489 | Appointment of Maher Khalil al-Hassan as Chief Executive Officer of the Syrian Petroleum Company | 18 October 2026 | | |
| 191 | 490 | Appointment of Engineer Omar Samer al-Halabi as Economic Affairs Advisor to the Presidency of the Republic and Chairman of the Board of Directors of the Sovereign Fund | 18 October 2026 | | |
| 192 | 491 | | | | |
| 193 | 492 | | | | |
| 194 | 493 | | | | |
| 195 | 494 | | | | |
| 196 | 495 | | | | |
| 197 | 496 | | | | |
| 198 | 497 | | | | |
| 199 | 498 | | | | |
| 200 | 499 | | | | |
| 201 | 500 | | | | |
| 202 | 501 | Appointment of Mr Mohammad Nidal al-Shaar as Advisor for Economic and Financial Affairs at the Presidency | 5 November 2026 | | |
| 203 | 502 | Appointment of Mr Ahmad Rawad Ramadan as Minister of Economy and Foreign Trade | 5 November 2026 | | |
| 204 | 503 | | 5 November 2026 | | |
| 205 | 504 | Appointment of Mr Mohammad Yaqoub al-Omar as Assistant Minister of Foreign Affairs and Expatriates for Consular Affairs | 5 November 2026 | | |
| 206 | 505 | Appointment of Mr Qutaiba Ali Qadish as Assistant Minister for International Cooperation Affairs | 5 November 2026 | | |
| 207 | 506 | Appointment of Mr Obada Khaled al-Diab as Assistant Minister of Foreign Affairs and Expatriates for Executive Affairs | 5 November 2026 | | |
| 208 | 507 | | | | |
| 209 | 508 | Appointment of Mr Abdullah Bashir al-Tahli as Assistant Minister of Interior for Civil Affairs | 7 November 2026 | | |
| 210 | 509 | Recognition of several faculties at Idlib University as established, effective from the date listed beside each | 7 November 2026 | | |
| 211 | 510 | Establishment of three faculties at the University of Aleppo, based in the city of al-Bab | 7 November 2026 | | |
| 212 | 511 | Establishment of the Faculty of Informatics Engineering at Hama University | 7 November 2026 | | |
| 213 | 512 | Establishment of the Faculty of Law at Hama University | 7 November 2026 | | |
| 214 | 513 | Establishment of three faculties at Al-Furat University, based in the city of Abu Kamal | 7 November 2026 | | |
| 215 | 514 | Establishment of the Faculty of Civil Engineering at University of Tartus | 7 November 2026 | | |
| 216 | 515 | Establishment of the Faculty of Law at University of Tartus | 7 November 2026 | | |
| 217 | 516 | Establishment of the Second Faculty of Economics at Latakia University, based in the city of Jableh | 7 November 2026 | | |
