= Faculty of Theology (Damascus) =

Religious Studies Institution in Damascus, Syria

- كلية اللاهوت الخاصة
- Motto: زِدْنا إيمانًا (Arabic) Πρόσθες ἡμῖν πίστιν (Greek) (Increase our faith) (Luke 17:5)
- Type: Private
- Established: 2019
- Religious affiliation: Melkite Greek Catholic Church
- Dean: Father Dr. Youssef Lajin
- Location: Damascus, Syria
- Campus: Urban
- Website: Official website

The Faculty of Theology in Damascus is the first academic institution in Syria dedicated to the study of Christian theology. Established in 2019 by a presidential decree, it operates under the Melkite Greek Catholic Patriarchate of Antioch and All the East. The Faculty opened its doors in November 2021 and is located in Damascus, Syria.

The institution aims to provide academic theological education in Syria for students who previously had to pursue such studies in Lebanon instead.

== History ==
The origins of the institution go back to when in October 2002, Patriarch Gregory III Laham established the "Christian Formation Center" (Arabic: مركز التنشئة المسيحية) in the building of the Patriarchal School, which had been founded in 1950 by Patriarch Maximos IV Sayegh with the support of benefactors Sahnaoui and Barsa. The center was placed under the direction of Bishop Dr. Youssef Absi of the Basilian Salvatorian Order (who later became known as Patriarch Youssef Absi in 2017), with Father Rami Elias, S.J. serving as its first director until 2012.

In 2012, Patriarch Gregory III appointed Father Dr. Youssef Lajin of the Basilian Chouerite Order as the new director. Father Lajin was later tasked with serving as the first dean of the institution under Ministry of Higher Education and Scientific Research decision No. 359. The center initially offered a four-year theological studies program that awarded a graduation certificate.

Following repeated requests to the Ministry of Higher Education and Scientific Research, and with the support of First Lady, Asma al-Assad, in 2019, Syrian President Bashar al-Assad issued Presidential Decree No. 6 of 2019, making the center officially licensed as a recognized academic institution in Syria. It was renamed the "Faculty of Theology" and began offering bachelor's degrees in theology, with its dean authorized to represent the institution externally.

The Faculty's establishment marked a significant step in advancing Christian theological education within the country. The inauguration ceremony, held in November 2021, was attended by prominent figures, including Minister of Presidential Affairs Mansour Azzam, Minister of Higher Education and Scientific Research Bassam Ibrahim, Patriarch Youssef Absi of the Melkite Greek Catholic Church, as well as cultural and religious leaders. Initially, the Faculty was expected to accommodate 50 students in its first year of operation.

In 2022, the Faculty received a donation of philosophical books from the Embassy of Chile in Damascus. The works, authored by prominent Chilean philosophers, cover topics such as metaphysics and ethics. The collection aims to promote cultural exchange and expand the Faculty's academic resources.

== Significance ==
The establishment of the Faculty came at a time of significant demographic changes among Syria's Christian population. Once comprising 10-12% of the country's population, the Christian community has seen a sharp decline due to emigration caused mainly by the ongoing civil war. The Faculty's creation was viewed as a response to these challenges, aiming to preserve Syria's Christian heritage and provide academic opportunities for the remaining community.

== Vision and goals ==
According to Patriarch Youssef Absi of the Melkite Greek Catholic Church, the Faculty seeks to become a "hub for distinctive, modern theological thought that engages with its local environment". The institution not only aims to provide traditional theological education but also encourages critical thinking and the development of new ideas. Its primary goals include:

- Offering bachelor's degrees in theology.
- Providing opportunities for research and intellectual engagement.
- Strengthening the presence of Christian institutions in Syria.

The Faculty is designed to serve as a center for interfaith dialogue and coexistence and to reflect Damascus's historical role as a city of cultural and religious diversity, and its doors are going to be opened for followers of any denomination and religion.

The Faculty also seeks to collaborate with international universities and institutions. Its leadership envisions partnerships that will allow students to gain broader perspectives while fostering ties with Christian communities abroad.

== Educational system ==
The Faculty complements existing theological institutes in Syria, which previously focused on non-accredited religious training. By offering formal degrees, the institution provides students with credentials recognized both locally and internationally.

The Faculty says it fully complies with the requirements of the Vatican's Congregation for Catholic Education, with its curriculum designed in accordance with the standards set by this Roman congregation. This alignment ensures that the theology degree it grants is recognized by Catholic universities worldwide, including those in Lebanon and abroad.

Efforts are ongoing with the relevant Roman authorities to secure official Vatican recognition for the Faculty. The institution says such recognition would enable graduates to pursue advanced theological studies, including doctoral degrees, at foreign universities offering theology programs.

The Faculty says it aspires to provide scholarships in the future, ensuring that every student has the opportunity to further their specialization and achieve a doctoral degree wherever such programs are available.

The Faculty has an agreement with the Syrian Virtual University to make the registration available through its portal, with courses available in person at the faculty's campus, and online through the Syrian Virtual university.

== Controversies ==
=== Exploitation by the Ba'athist regime ===
The establishment of the Faculty sparked controversy regarding its political and sectarian implications at the time. Announced shortly after the abolition of the office of the Grand Mufti, some observers viewed the timing as indicative of a broader strategy by the Syrian government to reshape the religious landscape. While the college was formally authorized in 2019 through Legislative Decree No. 6, its inauguration coincided with steps to centralize religious authority under the jurisdiction of the Ministry of Religious Endowments (Awqaf), a move interpreted by critics as sidelining Sunni Islamic institutions.

Analysts argue that the government at the time was leveraging the faculty to project an image of secularism and inclusivity. According to the head of the Assyrian Monitor for Human Rights, Jamil Diarbakrli, Christian theological institutions had previously operated unofficially, making this formalization a symbolic gesture. However, Diarbakrli expressed skepticism, stating, "This step comes too late, as Christians no longer have a significant presence in Syria". He added that the timing suggested ulterior motives, including the consolidation of religious minorities into a coalition with the Assad regime.

Others, such as Christian journalist Ghiath Kano, accused the Ba'athist regime at the time of exploiting minority protection narratives to legitimize its rule. Kano criticized the government for contributing to the decades-long emigration of Christians from Syria while simultaneously marketing itself as a defender of minorities. He described the faculty's establishment as part of a broader strategy to marginalize the Sunni majority while promoting minority groups.

Sheikh Ammar Tawoos, a member of the Syrian Scholars Association, also voiced concerns about the regime’s objectives. Tawoos suggested that such actions are aligned with President Bashar al-Assad's vision of a "homogenized society", aimed at eliminating independent religious authorities to consolidate state control. He warned that these steps reflect a shift in the regime's tactics from military repression to leveraging religion for political gain, further entrenching sectarian divides.

=== Damaging the historical city wall ===
The construction and operation of the Faculty in Damascus have raised concerns about the preservation of the city's historical heritage, specifically the ancient city wall near Bab Sharqi. Critics allege that part of the wall, a UNESCO World Heritage site, was altered to create a large gate for vehicle access to the faculty's premises. This modification, which included the removal of a section of the wall, was prominently visible in promotional material shared by the faculty on social media.

This action has drawn sharp criticism from preservation advocates and citizens alike. Observers argue that it represents a violation of Damascus’s historical and cultural integrity. While the college is located in a historic area—Haret al-Zaytoun, adjacent to the Cathedral of Our Lady of the Dormition—many question whether the site was appropriate for such a project. Critics also note that the faculty's construction disregarded alternative solutions that could have avoided harm to the wall.

The incident has reignited broader concerns about Syria's ability to safeguard its cultural heritage during times of turmoil. While Damascus has retained much of its historical character, critics argue that repeated attacks on its monuments, often with the complicity of officials, pose an existential threat to its identity as one of the world's oldest continuously inhabited cities and oldest capital.

The faculty's promotional materials and official inauguration, reportedly under the patronage of President Bashar al-Assad and his wife, highlight the institutional authority behind the project. However, the lack of transparency about who authorized the wall's modification has fueled public outrage. Critics argue that the damage reflects broader neglect and exploitation of Syria’s historical sites during the country's ongoing conflict.

== See also ==
- Higher education in Syria
- List of universities in Syria
- Christianity in Syria
