= WIU (disambiguation) =

Western Illinois University is a public university in Macomb, Illinois, US.

WIU may also refer to:

- Wadi International University, in Wadi al-Nasara, Syria
- Washington International University, an online unaccredited university
- Webber International University, in Babson Park, Florida, US
- Wiru language (ISO 639-3: wiu)
- Wiu, a Brazilian rapper

== See also ==
- Wii U, Nintendo home video game console
