= Walid Qassab =

Syrian researcher and literary scholar

Walid Ibrahim Qassab
- وليد إبراهيم قصاب
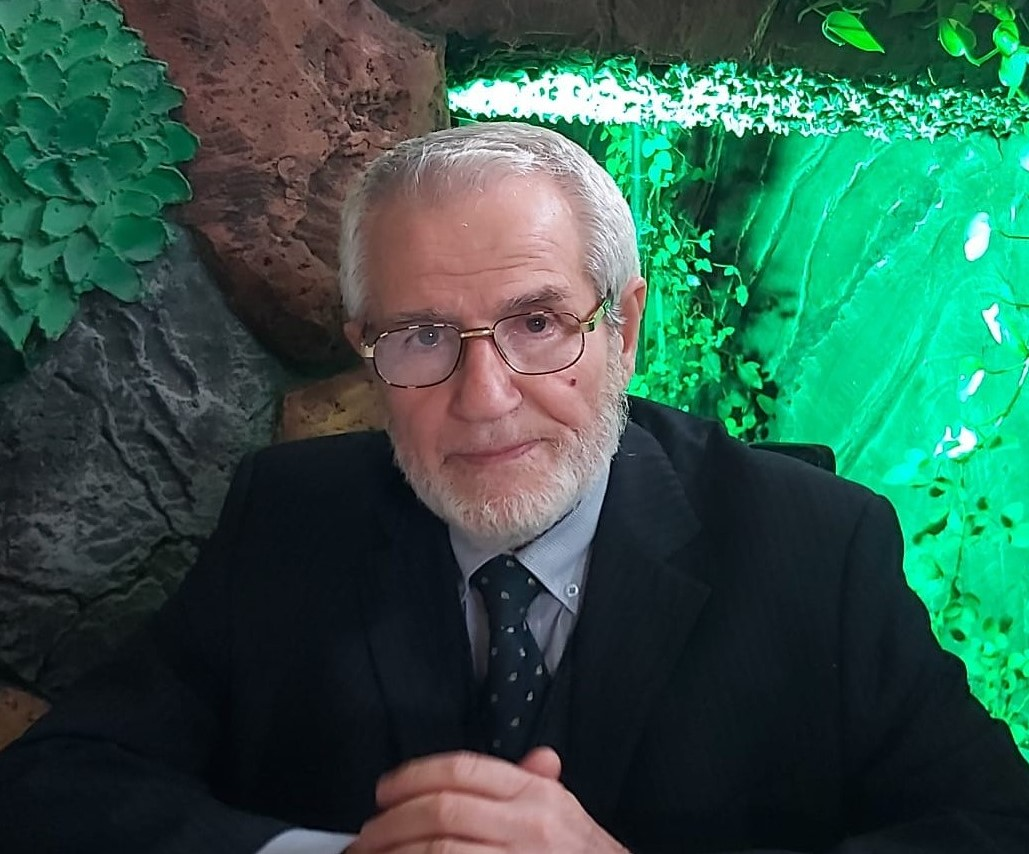
- Born: 1949 (age 76–77); Deir Atiyah, Syria
- Education: Damascus University; Cairo University; Wayne State University
- Occupations: Researcher, literary scholar, poet, short story writer, critic
- Known for: Professor of rhetoric and criticism; Vice President of the International League of Islamic Literature; Managing Editor of Al-Adab Al-Islami magazine

Walid Ibrahim Qassab (Arabic: وليد إبراهيم قصاب; born 1949) is a Syrian researcher, literary scholar, poet, short story writer, and critic. He is a professor of rhetoric and criticism at various Arab universities and has taught at universities in Syria, the United Arab Emirates, and Saudi Arabia.

Qassab is the Vice President of the International League of Islamic Literature and the managing editor of Al-Adab Al-Islami magazine. He is a member of the Arab Writers Union in Syria and the Arabic Language Protection Association in Sharjah. He has authored dozens of literary and critical works.

== Life ==
Walid Ibrahim Qassab was born in 1949 in Deir Atiyah, Syria, but grew up and received his early education in Damascus.

He earned a bachelor's degree in Arabic language from Damascus University in 1970, followed by a diploma in education from the same university in 1971. He then pursued his postgraduate studies at Cairo University, where he completed his master's and doctoral degrees. His master's thesis, supervised by Professor Yusuf Khalifa in 1973, was on "The Issue of the Pillar of Poetry in Ancient Arabic Criticism, Its Appearance and Development." In 1976, he earned his Ph.D., supervised by renowned scholar Shawqi Deif, with a dissertation on "The Rhetorical and Critical Heritage of the Mu'tazila until the Sixth Hijri Century." He also holds a diploma in journalism from Wayne State University in the United States.
