= OACIS for the Middle East =

OACIS for the Middle East is a union list of serials from or about the Middle East.

== Members ==
- American University of Beirut
- Bibliotheca Alexandrina
- Cornell University
- Harvard University
- New York Public Library
- New York University
- Ohio State University
- Princeton University
- School of Oriental and African Studies, University of London, UK
- Stanford University
- Latakia University, Syria
- Universitäts- und Landesbibliothek Sachsen-Anhalt, Halle, Germany
- University of Arizona
- University of Balamand, Al-Kurah, Lebanon
- University of California—Los Angeles
- University of Illinois at Urbana-Champaign
- University of Jordan, Amman, Jordan
- University of Pennsylvania
- University of Michigan
- University of Texas
- University of Utah
- University of Washington
- Yale Law School
- Yale University
