= Higher Institute of Demographic Studies and Research =

Educational institution in Damascus, Syria

- المعهد العالي للدراسات والبحوث السكانية
- Motto: No Development Without Cooperation
- Type: Public
- Established: 2003
- Location: Damascus, Syria; 33.5075642°N 36.2850597°E
- Campus: Urban
- Website: HIDSR.edu.sy

The Higher Institute of Demographic Studies and Research is an educational institution located in Al-Baramkeh district of Damascus, the capital of Syria.

Established in 2003, the institute aims to qualify national cadres with advanced academic degrees in demographic sciences that address societal needs and labor market requirements.

== History ==
The institute was founded in 2003 to address the growing demand for skilled professionals in demographic studies. It focuses on training and qualification in demographic and developmental sciences, child protection from abuse and neglect, and alternative care, alongside conducting scientific studies and research related to demographics.

== Programs and Degrees ==
The institute offers several academic degrees in demographic sciences, including:

- Diploma in Demographic Sciences.
- Graduate Diploma in Demographic Sciences.
- Master’s degree in Demographic Sciences.
- Doctorate in Demographic Sciences.

== Controversies ==
In January 2021, the institute faced controversy regarding the acceptance lists for its master's program. A decision to revoke the initial acceptance lists, which included a significant number of female candidates, was made without prior notice, raising concerns about transparency and fairness in the admissions process.

== See also ==
- Education in Syria
- List of universities in Syria
