= University of Tartus =

Public university in Syria

- جَامِعَةُ طَرطوس
- Type: Public
- Established: January 5, 2015
- President: Dr. Adeeb Mohammad Barhoum
- Location: Tartus, Syria
- Campus: Urban
- Website: tartous-univ.edu.sy

The University of Tartus (Note: Also spelled "Tartous". Both spellings are used when translating the name of the city from Arabic. This is even done by the Syrian government.) (Arabic: جامعة طرطوس, romanized: Jāmiʿat Ṭarṭūs) is a public university located in the costal city of Tartus, Syria. It was established by Syrian Presidential Decree No. 2 of 2015, having previously been part of the Latakia University.

== Faculties ==
The University of Tartus consists of the following Faculties:

- Faculty of Technical Engineering
- Faculty of Arts and Humanities
- Faculty of Economics
- Faculty of Education (College of Education)
- Faculty of Information and Communication Technology
- Faculty of Tourism
- Faculty of Science
- Faculty of Medicine
- Faculty of Architecture Engineering

In addition, the university includes the Higher Institute of Languages.

== See also ==
- Education in Syria
- List of universities in Syria
