= Aqrabat =

Coordinates: 36.270°N 36.709°E

Aqrabat عقربات
- Village
- Location in Syria
- Country: Syria
- Governorate: Idlib
- District: Idlib District
- Subdistrict: Idlib Nahiyah

Population (2004)
  - Total: 1,086
- Time zone: UTC+2 (EET)
  - Summer (DST): UTC+3 (EEST)
- City Qrya Pcode: C3866
- Climate: Csa

Aqrabat (Arabic: عقربات) is a Syrian village located in Idlib Nahiyah in Idlib District, Idlib. According to the Syria Central Bureau of Statistics (CBS), Aqrabat had a population of 1086 in the 2004 census.
