= University of Kalamoon =

University in Syria

University of Kalamoon جامعة القلمون الخاصة
- Type: Private
- Established: 18 August 2003; 22 years ago
- Students: 7000 (2011)
- Location: Deir Atiyah, An-Nabek District, Syria
- Website: www.uok.edu.sy

The University of Kalamoon (Arabic: جامعة القلمون الخاصة) is a private, accredited university located in Deir Atiyah An-Nabek District Rif Dimashq Governorate in Syria, located between the Qalamoun Mountains and the Eastern Lebanon Mountains, 88 kilometres (55 miles) north of the capital Damascus.

It is the first private university in Syria, and was founded on August 18, 2003.

== Academic agreements ==
Universities/International Institutions:

- (United Kingdom) University of Glamorgan
- (United States) University of Michigan
- (Netherlands) University of Amsterdam
- (United States) University of Oklahoma
- (France) University of Paris 8
- (Northern Cyprus) Eastern Mediterranean University
- (Iran) Islamic Azad University
- (United States) University of Wyoming
- (France) University of Strasbourg
- (France) National Center for University and Study Services CNOUS
- (Italy) University of Genoa, CRUIE Research Center for Town Planning and Environmental Engineering
- (France) High School of Communication ENST
- (France) Institute of Political Studies and the National Institute of Political Sciences (Science-PO)
- The Network of Syrian Scientists and Innovators in the Expatriate NOSSTIA
- (France) International Center for Educational Studies (CIEP)
- (Germany) University of Berlin, Teaching Hospital
- United Nations Volunteer Program

2- Universities/local and Arab institutions:

- (Syria) Department of Medical Services - Syrian Ministry of Defense
- (Iraq) University of Anbar
- (Syria) Latakia University
- (Egypt) Cairo University

In addition to scientific and academic cooperation, these agreements included other important topics, including: Quality control and development of the academic system and study plans

- Scientific and cultural exchange, including the exchange of scientific publications
- Postgraduate programs, conducting joint scientific research and projects, and organizing specialized conferences.
- Faculty exchange, student exchange, student research support, and training.

Twinning between some faculties of the university and its counterparts in international universities

== Faculties ==
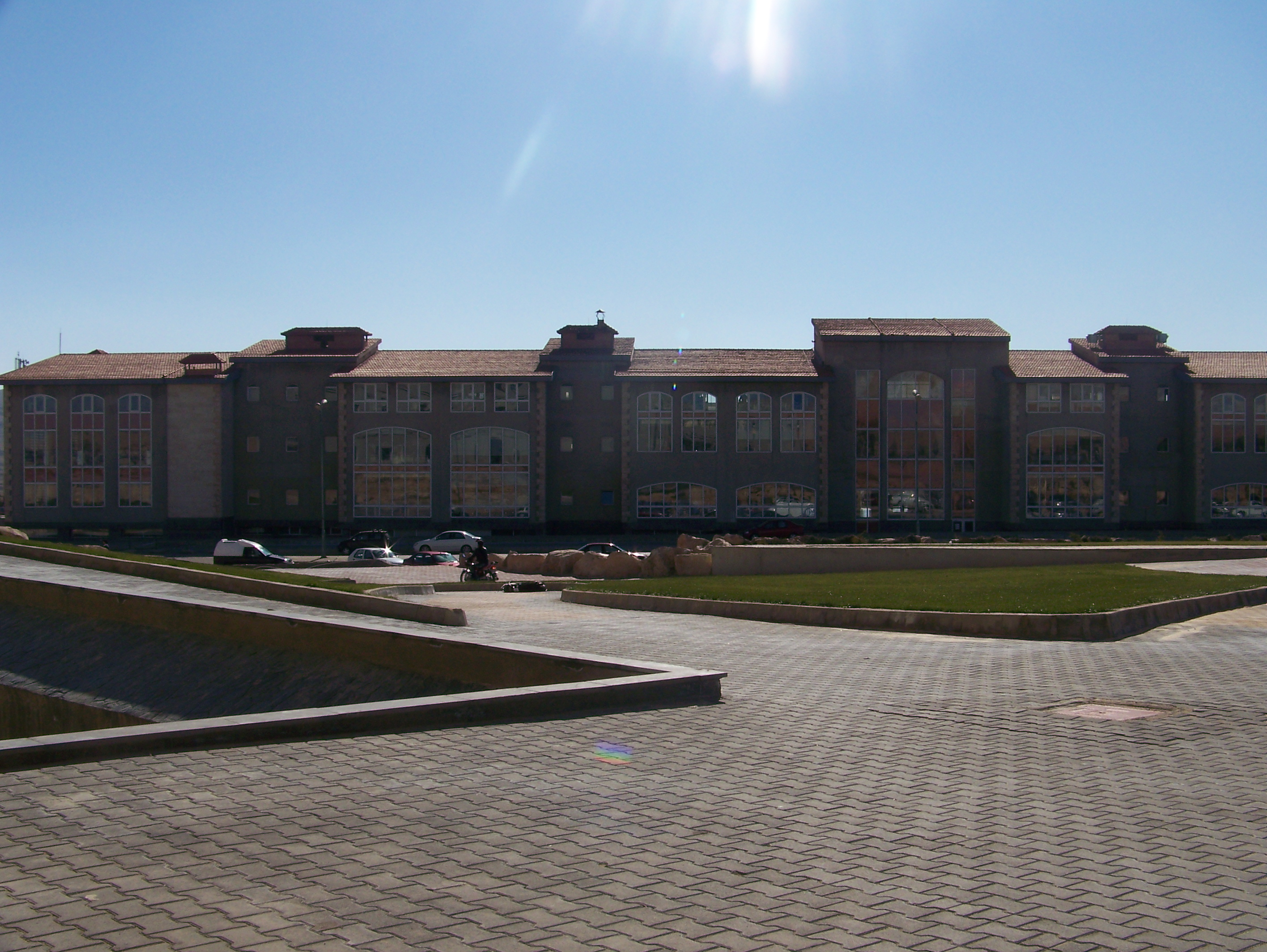
University building in 2011

University of Kalamoon includes nine faculties:

- Medicine
- Dentistry
- Pharmacy
- Engineering
- Business & Management
- Diplomacy & International relations
- Applied Sciences
- Health Sciences
- Media

== See also ==
- List of universities in Syria
