= Al-Wataniya Private University =

Coordinates: 34°58′09.5″N 36°45′06.1″E

- الجامعة الوطنية الخاصة
- Type: Private
- Established: 2007
- Chancellor: Ahed Khezam
- Address: Hama Governorate - International Highway (Hama-Homs), Hama, Syria
- Language: Arabic
- Website: www.wpu.edu.sy

Al-Wataniya Private University, founded in 2007, is a private university located in Hama, Syria.

== Structure ==
=== Faculties ===
- Dentistry:
  1. Department of Biology
  2. Department of Odontology
  3. Department of dental therapy
  4. Department of Orthodontics and Pediatric Dentistry
  5. Department of Periodontology
  6. Department Prosthodontics
  7. Department of Oral and Maxillofacial Surgery
- Pharmacy:
  1. Department of Pharmaceutics and Pharmaceutical Technology
  2. Department of Pharmacology and Toxicology
  3. Department of Analytical and Food Chemistry
  4. Department of Biochemistry and Microbiology
  5. Department of Pharmaceutical Chemistry and Drug Control
  6. Department of Drugs
- Architecture:
  1. Department of Architecture
  2. Department of Urban planning
  3. Department of Interior Architecture
- Engineering:
  1. Department of Computer Engineering
  2. Department of Telecommunications Engineering
  3. Department of Civil Engineering
- Finance and administrative science:
  1. Department of Business Management
  2. Department of Accounting
  3. Department of Marketing
  4. Department of Finance & Banking

== See also ==
- List of universities in Syria
