= Cordoba Private University =

Syrian science and technology university in Aleppo

- Type: Private
- Established: 2003
- President: Mohammad Ousama Dueidari
- Location: Aleppo, Aleppo Governorate, Syria; 36°34′53″N 36°57′59″E
- Campus: Urban
- Website: www.cpu.edu.sy

Cordoba Private University (Arabic: جامعة قرطبة الخاصة), formerly known as Mamoun University for Science and Technology (MUST) (Arabic: جامعة المأمون الخاصة للعلوم والتكنولوجيا), is a private university in Syria. It was established by the Republic Decree No. 294 in 2003 at its headquarters in the city of Al-Qamishli in Al-Hasakah Governorate and its branch in Aleppo Governorate, to be one of the first private Syrian universities.

It contains three colleges, namely the College of Administrative and Financial Sciences and the Faculty of Living Languages and Human Sciences and the College of Engineering and Technology.

In 2011, Syrian Engineers Association has acquired Mamoun University for Science and Technology. On 2 Feb 2014, the minister of higher education, Malek Ali, issued a decree No. 154 approving the change of the name of Mamoun Private University for Science and Technology, to be Cordoba Private University, upon the request of the Syrian Engineers Association, the owner of the university.

The Mamoun University is under an academic cooperation agreement with the University of Sunderland.

== Faculties ==
- Engineering and Technology
- Management and Finance Science
- Languages and Humanities
- Dentistry
- Architecture
