= Bassam Bashir Ibrahim =

Syrian politician

HE Bassam Bashir Ibrahim بسام بشير ابراهيم

Minister of Higher Education and Scientific Research
- In office 26 November 2018 – 23 September 2024
- President: Bashar al-Assad
- Prime Minister: Imad Khamis; Hussein Arnous
- Preceded by: Atef Naddaf
- Succeeded by: Bassam Hasan

Personal details
- Born: 1960 (age 65–66) Hama, Hama Governorate, United Arab Republic
- Education: Moscow State University of Civil Engineering; University of Aleppo
- Profession: Politician, Scientist, Civil servant

Bassam Bashir Ibrahim (Arabic: بسام بشير ابراهيم) (born 1960) is a Syrian engineer and politician. He was the Higher Education Minister between 2018 and 2024.

== Education ==
He graduated from Moscow State University of Civil Engineering and the University of Aleppo.

== Career ==
Held a number of administrative positions such as Deputy Dean of Civil Engineering Faculty in al-Baath University, Dean of Civil Engineering Faculty (1999-2005) and Rector of al-Baath University since 2017.
