= Higher Institute of Business Administration =

Educational institution in Damascus, Syria

- المعهد العالي لإدارة الأعمال
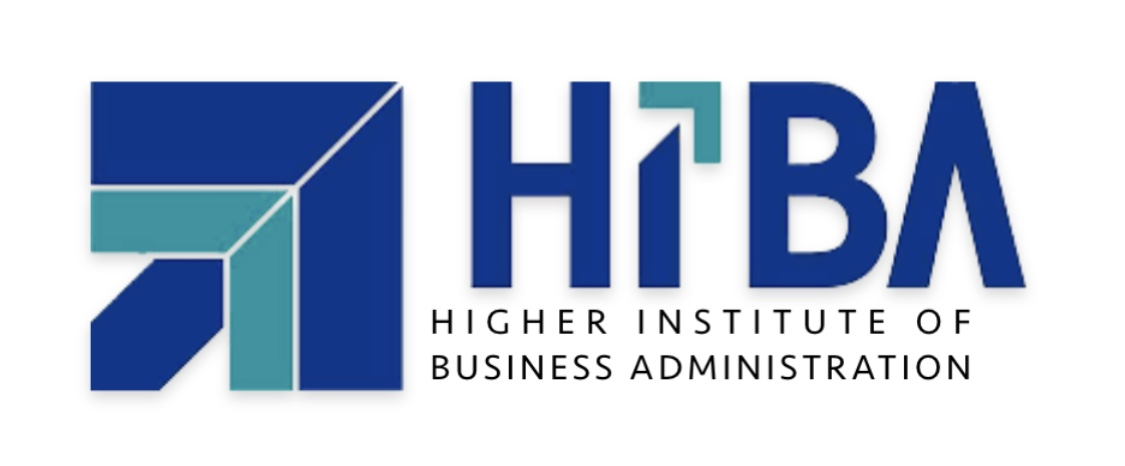
- Type: Public
- Established: 23 June 2001
- Location: Damascus, Syria; 33°33′00″N 36°18′21″E
- Campus: Urban
- Website: www.hiba.edu.sy

The Higher Institute of Business Administration is a public higher education institution in Syria's capital, Damascus, that focuses on teaching business administration. Established in 2001, it is located in the Barzeh district of Damascus,.

== Vision and Goals ==
The institute aims to contribute to administrative development and human resources enhancement. It says it conducts many of its activities within the framework of cooperation with other educational institutions, including partnerships with the European Union. Today, the institute is said to be considered one of the most important educational institutions in Syria in the field of business administration.

== Educational Curriculum ==
The institute offers its students a degree in Business Administration through a program for full-time students. The curriculum includes tools necessary to strengthen foreign language skills (English and French), information technology, mathematics, and business language.

The study period lasts five years and is divided into:

- Preparatory Stage: Three years in management
- Specialization Stage: Two years, culminating in a degree in Business Administration in one of the following specializations:

- Human Resource Management
- Marketing and International Trade
- Financial and Banking Management
- Management Information Systems

== See also ==
- Education in Syria
- List of universities in Syria
