= Al-Shahba University =

University in Syria

Coordinates: 36.2185°N 37.11439°E

Al-Shahbaa University
- جامعة الشهباء
- Type: Private
- Established: 2005
- Location: Aleppo, Aleppo Governorate, Syria
- Campus: Urban
- Website: www.su.edu.sy

Al-Shahba University (SU; Arabic: جامعة الشهباء), is a private university in Syria, established in 2005. It is located in the southern suburbs of the city of Aleppo. It was known as the Gulf University until February 2012 when the name was changed to al-Shahba University.

Al-Shahba University is under academic cooperation agreements with the George Mason University and Bentley University.

== Faculties ==
- Engineering and technology
- Management
- Dentistry
