= Arab International University =

Syrian university

Arab International University الْجَامِعَةُ الْعَرَبِيَّةُ الدَّوْلِيَّةُ
- Type: Private
- Established: 5 June 2005; 21 years ago
- President: Prof. Dr. Tamer Al Hajeh
- Location: Ghabaghib, Daraa Governorate, Syrian Arab Republic; 33.175958°N 36.299498°E
- Website: aiu.edu.sy

The Arab International University (AIU; Arabic: الْجَامِعَةُ الْعَرَبِيَّةُ الدَّوْلِيَّةُ, romanized: al-Jāmiʿat al-ʿArabīyat ad-Dawlīyah, formerly Arab European University) is a Syrian private university located in Ghabaghib, Daraa Governorate, Syria, founded in 2005. It was created under Presidential Decree No. 193 on the 06/05/2005.

The campus is located on the international highway between Damascus and Daraa, 37 kilometres (23 miles) away from the capital, and after International University for Science and Technology toward Daraa. The total area of the campus is 211,000 square metres (52 acres).

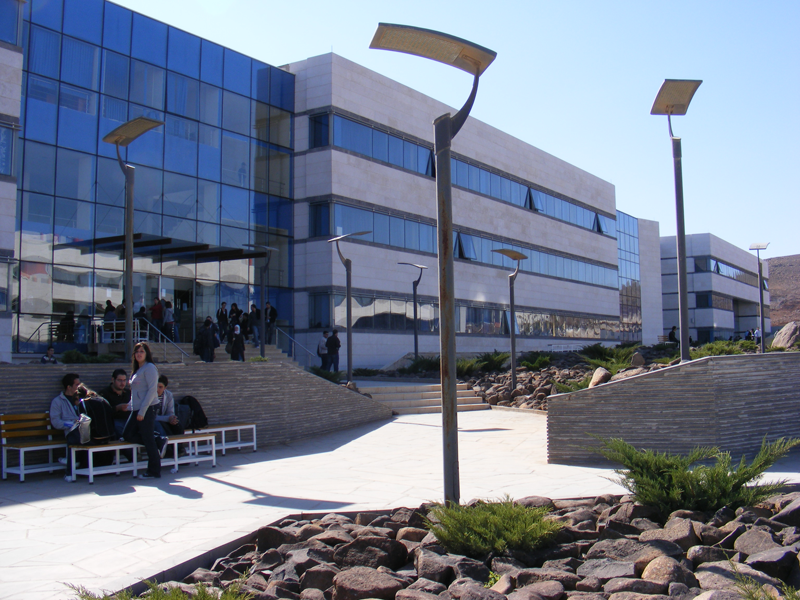
AIU Campus

== Faculties ==
- Faculty of Dentistry
- Department of Dentistry
  - Department of basic and medical sciences.
  - Department of histopathology and anatomy.
  - Oral medicine department.
  - Department of dental treatment.
  - Dental implantation department.
  - Department of periodontal diseases
  - Oral rehabilitation department.
  - Department of Orthodontics and paediatric dentistry.
  - Department of Oral and Maxillofacial Surgery.
- Faculty of Pharmacy
- Faculty of Architecture
- Faculty of Civil engineering
- Faculty of Informatics and Communication engineering
  - Department of Information technology
  - Department of Communications
  - Department of Computer Science
- Faculty of Business Administration
  - Department of Management
  - Department of Marketing
  - Department of Accounting
  - Department of Finance and Banking
  - Department of Information technology management
- Faculty of Fine Arts
  - Department of Industrial Design
  - Department of Fashion Design
  - Department of Interior design
  - Department of Visual Communication and Graphic Design
- Faculty of Law
