= Al-Jazeera University =

Private university in Damascus, Syria

Coordinates: 33.1668°N 36.2975°E

- جامعة الجزيرة الخاصة
- Type: Private
- Established: 2007
- Academic staff: 700
- Students: 2500
- Location: Deir ez-Zor, Deir ez-Zor Governorate, Syria
- Website: www.jude.edu.sy
- Location in Syria

Al-Jazeera University in Damascus/Deir ez Zor (Arabic: جامعة الجزيرة الخاصة) is a private university located in Damascus, Syria. JUDE was originally established in Deir Ezzor in 2007 as the first private university in eastern Syria.

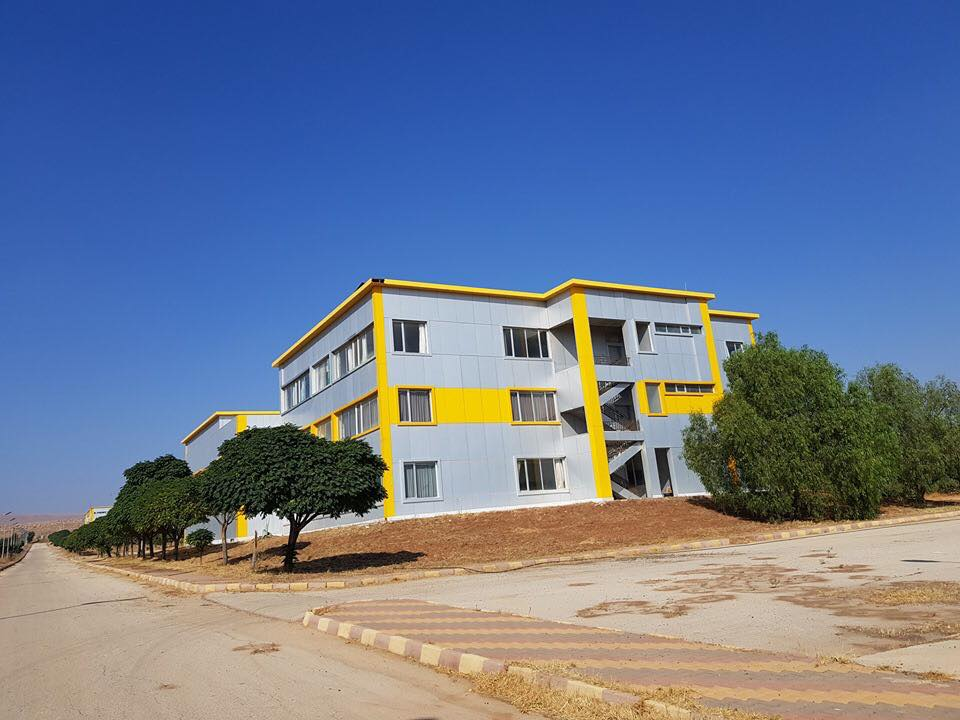
University building in 2019

The College of Engineering has three departments: Civil Engineering, Architectural Engineering, Informatics, College of Business Administration, and College of Pharmacy.
