= Deir Atiyah =

Town in Syria

Deir Atiyah دير عطية
- Town
- Location in Syria
- Coordinates: 34°05′N 36°46′E
- Country: Syria
- Governorate: Rif Dimashq
- District: An-Nabek
- Subdistrict: Deir Atiyah
- Elevation: 1,250 m (4,100 ft)

Population (2004 census)
  - Total: 10,984

Deir Atiyah or Dayr Atiyah (Arabic: دير عطية) is a town in Syria, located between the Qalamoun Mountains and the Eastern Lebanon Mountains Series, 88 kilometres (55 mi) north of the capital Damascus and on the road to the city of Homs. According to the Syria Central Bureau of Statistics (CBS), Deir Atiyah had a population of 10,984 in the 2004 census.

Deir Atiyah enjoys a moderate climate in summer and cold in the winter as it is located at an altitude of 1,250 metres (4,100 ft) above sea level.

The proximity to a desert region, where the average rainfall does not exceed more than 125 millimetres (4.9 in) annually, means that environmental conditions, including poor soil, does not provide adequate resources to economically sustain the local population. Many locals immigrated to the Americas in the early 20th century, to the Persian Gulf countries after the emergence of job opportunities there, and to East Asia.

== Agriculture ==
Farmers cultivate grapes, apricots, cherries, figs and other fruits.

Deir Atiyah benefits from groundwater located in its valley.

Deir Atiyah has a number of windmills (sometimes referred to as Air Wheels). The power generated by the windmills is used to pump water from deep wells. The origins of the windmills are not known, but they are reported to be a major source of power to pump water for agriculture for more than a hundred years.

== Culture ==
Deir Atiyah has a museum, a sports center and cultural center. In 2003, the first private university in Syria, University of Kalamoon, was opened in Deir Atiyah.

People in Deir Atiyah consume a hot drink called Mate, which Syrian expatriates brought and introduced from South America. The invitation "Come and drink Mate" is typical of this region's hospitality. The invitation implies not only the sharing of a drink, but also a meal.

== History ==
Historians match the name of this city with a supposed Roman or Byzantine official, Theodorus Paulus, whose first name means "Gift of God" (Arabic: عطاء الله). This name has been associated in minds of successive generations in Dair Atiah for more than thousand years.

A number of ancient Roman channels can be found in Yabroud, close to Deir Atiyah.

In 1838, its inhabitants were predominantly Sunni Muslims and Antiochian Greek Christians.

=== Syrian civil war ===
Deir Atiyah was affected by the Syrian civil war, like any Syrian town and city in Damascus suburbs. It underwent multiple attacks from both the Syrian Armed Forces, and opposition groups. Among these was a car bomb that detonated outside a police station on 14 July 2013. Thirteen people, including ten police officers, were killed in the attack. The Al-Nusra Front was suspected by Syrian officials to be the perpetrators, but no group ever claimed responsibility for the attack. Syrian rebels captured the town in late November 2013, but it was retaken by the Syrian government within a week.

== Main sights ==
- The Museum of Deir Atiyah: The Museum of Deir Atiyah is one of the biggest and richest museums in Damascus suburb, Reif Dimashq. It contains the heritage and folklore of the region.
- The Canonical Museum of Deir Atiyah
- The Cultural Palace of Deir Atiyah
- The Village of Special Needs
- Hammam el-Souk el-Tahtanye

== Bibliography ==
- Robinson, E.; Smith, E. (1841). Biblical Researches in Palestine, Mount Sinai and Arabia Petraea: A Journal of Travels in the year 1838. Vol. 3. Boston: Crocker & Brewster.
