= Syrian Private University =

Private university in Damascus, Syria

Coordinates: 33°18′51.33″N 36°16′09.31″E

Syrian Private University (SPU)
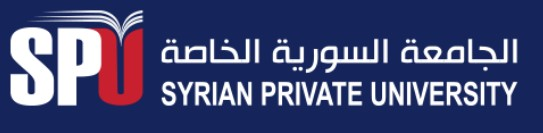
- Type: Private
- Established: 2005
- President: Prof. Dr. Edmon Saloum
- Students: 5000
- Location: Damascus, Syria
- Website: www.spu.edu.sy

Syrian Private University or SPU (SPU; Arabic: الْجَامِعَةُ السُّورِيَّةُ الْخَاصَّةُ, romanized: al-Jāmiʿat as-Sūrīyat al-Khāṣṣat), formerly Syrian International University for Science and Technology, is a private university located in Syria.

== History ==
The Syrian Private University was established in 2005 by a number of academics and businessmen from Syria and the Arab region.

== Campus ==
The 54-acre (250,000 m^{2}) Syrian Private University campus is on Daraa International Highway and it is 24 km away from Damascus.

The Dental Clinics Complex consists of 2 floors, each containing 3 dental clinics and 106 dental units in total. The dental units serve with the already available one hundred units within the Faculty of Dentistry.

== University Hospital ==
The Syrian Private University Hospital is a private hospital located within the university campus.

== Undergraduate programs ==
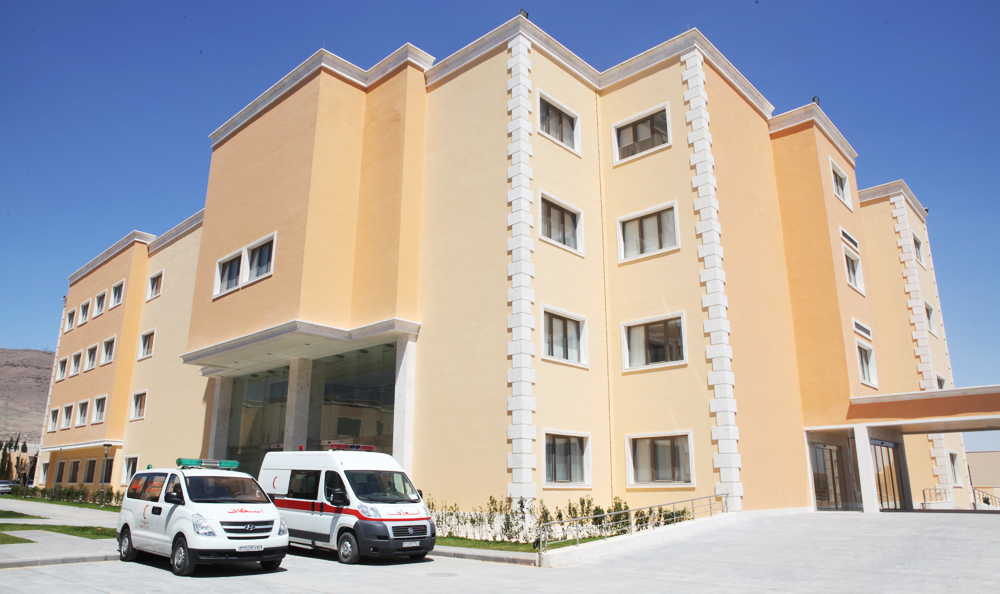
SPU University Hospital

=== Medicine ===
SPU Medical School awards the Medical Doctor degree to medical students who successfully complete the medical program. The medical curriculum is 6 years long.

=== Dentistry ===
SPU Dental School awards the Doctor of Dental Medicine degree. Like most Syrian universities offering DDM degrees, the focus on the undergraduate program is on the practical aspects of the profession.

=== Pharmacy ===
The pharmacy program is five-year program leading to a Bachelor of Science in pharmacy. The school of pharmacy underwent reform in 2011 with new management and new faculty.

=== Business Administration ===
The Syrian Private University's School of Business Administration currently offers a 4-year degree program in a variety of specializations including marketing and management.

=== Petroleum Engineering ===
The College of Petroleum Engineering in the Syrian Private University awards a degree in petroleum engineering students who successfully complete the program. The engineering curriculum is 5 years long, The College of Petroleum Engineering program is 177 credit hours over ten semesters.

== Student life ==
=== Varsity sports ===
The basketball, football, volleyball, tennis, teams at the Syrian Private University participate in local and regional tournaments.

== Library ==
The SPU library houses a collection of books and provide electronic libraries for its students.
