= Syrian Virtual University =

Syrian educational institution

Coordinates: 33.5113334°N 36.2739818°E

- الْجَامِعَة الافْتِرَاضِيَّة السُّورِيَّة
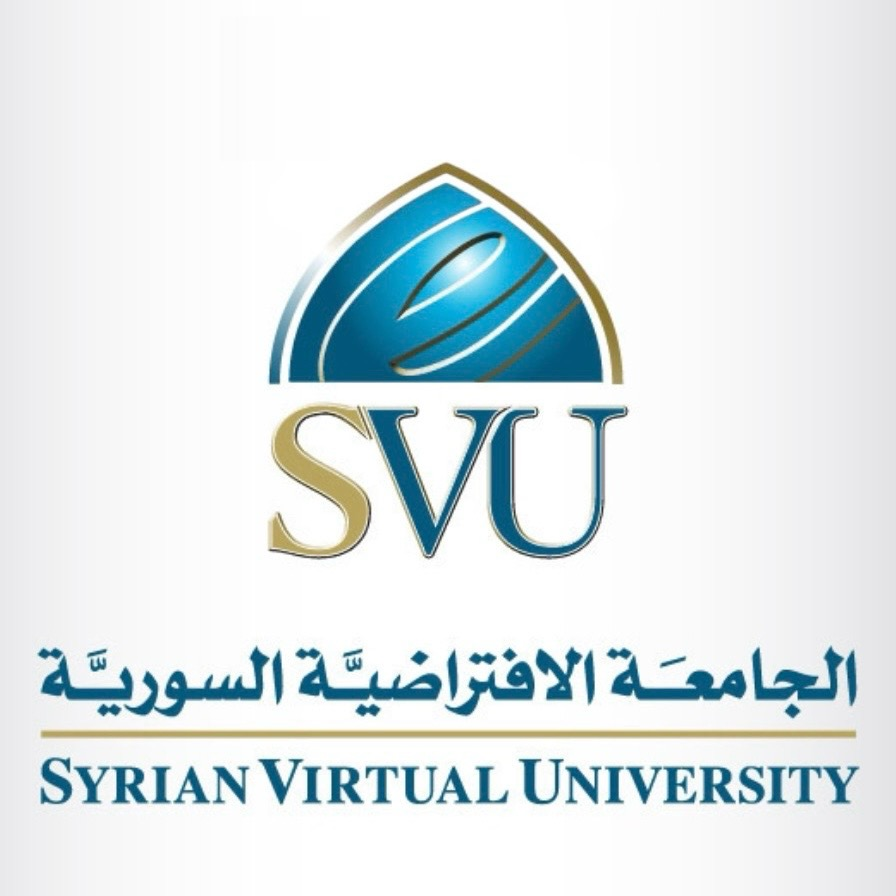
- Syrian Virtual University emblem
- Type: Public
- Established: 8 May 2002
- President: Dr. Khalil Ajami
- Location: Damascus, Syria
- Nickname: SVU
- Website: www.svuonline.org

The Syrian Virtual University (SVU; Arabic: الْجَامِعَةِ الافْتِرَاضِيَّة السُّورِيَّةُ, romanized: al-Jāmiʿat al-ʾIftirāḍīyat as-Sūrīyah) is a Syrian higher education institution established by the Ministry of Higher Education and Scientific Research. Founded on 2 September 2002, it is regarded as the first virtual university in the region. The university offers online degree programmes to students in Syria and abroad, while examinations are held at SVU-accredited centres inside and outside the country. Its headquarters are located at the Ministry of Higher Education building in Damascus.

== Academic programs ==
SVU offers bachelor's and master's degree programmes, as well as professional training courses.

=== Domestic programs ===
All domestic programs are provided in Arabic (except for the English HND), some courses are taught in English. Originally, all domestic SVU programs were related to Computer Science, but two new programs in Economics were added in 2007. There is currently a total of six domestic degree programs.

==== 2-year Undergraduate Programs ====
- HND stands for the Higher National Diploma in Computing and Business Applications. It is offered in English and Arabic. The duration of study is two years. HND is available in two versions, one taught in Arabic and another in English.

==== 5-year Undergraduate Programs ====
- ITE (Information Technology Engineering) program aims to prepare IT engineers in general, and specifically IT engineers specialized in Software Engineering, Artificial Intelligence, or Computer Systems and Networks, and possessing the basic knowledge and skills in these engineering sciences. This is done by providing an appropriate environment for the application of modern teaching methods that motivate the student to collect, analyze, set up and generate solutions, and be able to innovate and modernize; and to provide students through this environment with the necessary theoretical and practical knowledge needed by information engineers.
- ISE (deprecated) is a credit-based BSc program in Information Systems Engineering. The content is very much that of a traditional Computer Science degree, but offered online. The student has to take a number of "core courses" and then a number of "specialized courses" with the aid of a career planner. There are currently (as of 2008) four core specialization areas: Software Application Development, Multimedia Systems, Networking and Operating Systems, and Intelligent Systems. It is possible to choose an emphasis within a core specialization area. A student must complete requirements in one or more specialization areas to graduate. The duration of study is (typically) five years.

==== Undergraduate Programs ====
- BAIT is a program leading to a Bachelor degree in Information Technology.
- BSCE is a Bachelor in Economics, with three possible branches: Business Administration, Banking and Finance, and Marketing. Duration of study is four years.
- BL is a Bachelor in law, with several specializations, including criminal and constitutional law.
- BMC is a Bachelor in Mass Communication, this program seeks to fulfill its message by providing distinguished academic services in the field of media qualification in Syria.
- EDUC is a Bachelor in Educational Habilitation Diploma
- TIC is Technological Institute of Computer, A certified assistant qualification in the field of software and information systems.

==== Postgraduate Programs ====
- MBA degree (duration: two years; total tuition cost: approximately US$3,500).
- Academic master's degree in Technology Management, with an emphasis on technology transfer, development through technology and application of new technologies in businesses, industries and societies.
- Master in Quality (MIQ). The Duration is two years. The total tuition cost is around $3500.
- Master in Building Information Modeling and Management (BIMM)
- Master in Technology Management (PMTM)
- Master in web technology (MWT).
- Master in Web Sciences (MWS)
- Master in Business Administration (MBA)
- Master in Medical Education (MedE)
- Master's degree in Integration of Technology in Education (MITE)
- Master's degree in International Humanitarian Law (MHL)
- Master's degree in Bio Informatics (BIS)
- Master's degree in Integrated Management of Natural Resources (IMNR)
- Doctoral Program

== Controversy and acceptance ==
=== Internet access ===
Students can use 3G Internet anywhere in Syria via the mobile phone network or they can register for ADSL service which has become available at US$30/month. Taking in mind that the average salary for government employees in Syria is between 150,000 and 300,000 Syrian Pounds (equivalent to $11-$22 a month), which makes high speed internet inaccessible to a huge part of the Syrian population.

One of the issues which the SVU faced during its launch was the lack of proper broadband Internet infrastructure in Syria. This can be viewed as a strategic problem, as it hinders potential students. Faced with the terrible performance of the teleconferencing software on Dial-Up (the only available option in Syria at the time). The university created a number of telecenters in multiple Syrian governorates so that students who lacked broadband Internet (most students) could attend their lessons. With the introduction of ADSL and ISDN in 2004, it was hoped that the severity of the problem would be ameliorated. Unfortunately, the situation has not improved much. Until late 2007, ADSL was not yet available. Subscriptions were fewer than 5000 throughout Syria as the cost for any potential adopter was too high (the actual going rate for an ADSL line was almost $1000), due to unavailability and high demand by internet cafes. ISDN, while difficult to attain in many areas, is more publicly available than ADSL, and thus is the only option for many Syrian SVU students who wish to attend lessons from their homes. Most Syrian SVU students attend classes from local telecenters. In 2011, ADSL in Syria cost much less than previously (4M ADSL Subscription cost approximately $4 which permits a student to attend classes). Now you can connect to ADSL from almost every home in any area.
