= Wadi International University =

- Wadi International University
- Motto in English: Your gateway to success
- Type: Private
- Established: 2005
- President: Prof. Dr. Bashir Suleiman Elias
- Faculty: 200
- Students: 1872
- Location: Wadi al-Nasara, Homs Governorate, Syria; 34°42′41″N 36°17′39″E
- Website: www.wiu.edu.sy

Wadi International University (Arabic: جامعة الوادي الدولية الخاصة), commonly referred to as the German Syrian University, is a private, internationally oriented university, located in Wadi al-Nasara in Syria.

The university was founded by German Syrian immigrants living in Germany with strong connections to German higher education institutions. The university was initially named as WGSU, Wadi German Syrian University, but was later changed to WIU, Wadi International University. WIU made strong agreements with multiple German universities such as Otto von Guericke University Magdeburg, University of Oldenburg and Brandenburg University of Technology, to support its faculties and to distinguish itself from other private universities in Syria. WIU is the only university in Syria that teaches its programs in English.

The university offers ten bachelor degrees, and is organized into three faculties. WIU has a student body of approximately 2500 undergraduate students.

== Dual degrees ==
WIU made agreements with multiple German universities such as Otto von Guericke University Magdeburg, University of Oldenburg and Brandenburg University of Technology, to offer dual degrees in many of its bachelors. In order to achieve the dual degrees, prospective students have to finish a semester at the German university, which resulted in an exchange student program. Every year a number of students from the different departments travel to Germany to finish their respective semester in order to achieve the dual degree. The engineering and management students mostly attend the Otto von Guericke University Magdeburg and the architecture student attend the Brandenburg University of Technology.

== Organization ==
The university has Four faculties:

- Faculty of Dentistry
- Faculty of Engineering
- Faculty of Management
- Faculty of Pharmacy

The university offers bachelor degrees in the following majors:

- Dentistry (5 year program)
- Computer Engineering (5 Year program)
- Communications Engineering (5 Year program)
- Business Informatics (5 Year program)
- Architecture (5 Year program)
- Civil Engineering (5 Year program)
- Business Administration (4 Year program)
- E-Marketing (4 Year program)
- E-Banking (4 Year program)
- Management and E-Business (4 Year program)
- Pharmacy (5 Year program)
