= Latakia University =

Public university in Latakia, Syria

Coordinates: 35°31′24″N 35°48′28″E

- جامعة اللاذقية
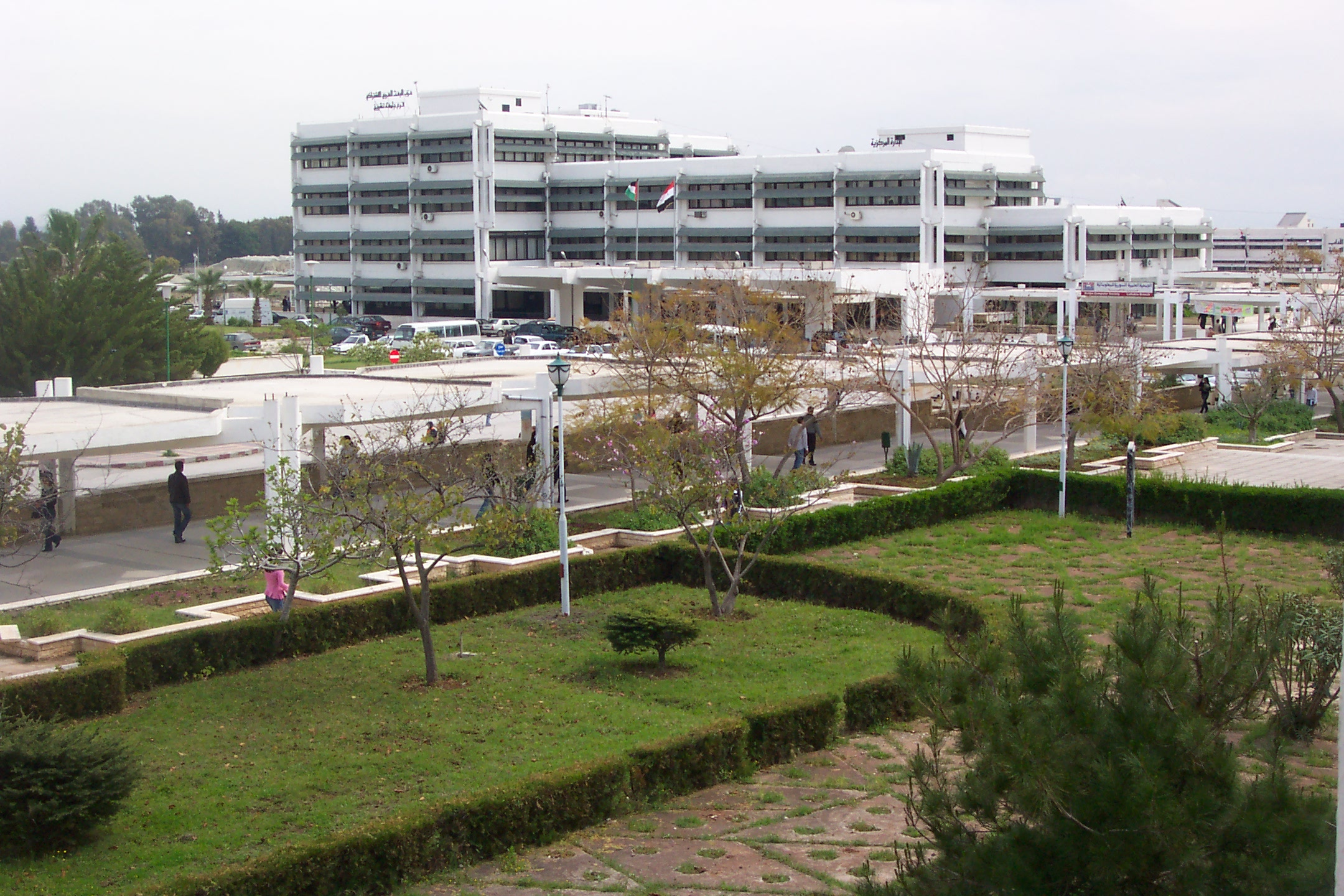
- Former names: Tishreen University
- Type: Public
- Established: 1971
- Academic affiliations: UNAI; UNIMED
- President: Iyad Fahsa
- Academic staff: 892
- Administrative staff: 2085
- Students: Over 70,000
- Location: Latakia, Syria
- Campus: Urban
- Website: latakia-univ.edu.sy

Latakia University (Arabic: جامعة اللاذقية, ALA-LC: Jāmiʻat al-Lādhiqīyah), formerly known as Tishreen University, is a public university located in Latakia, Syria. It is the third-largest university in Syria.

In 2025, the university was ranked first in Syria by the AD Scientific Index.

== History ==
The university was founded under the name of the University of Latakia on 20 May 1971. The name was changed in 1975 to Tishreen University (Arabic: جامعة تشرين, lit. 'October University') to honor the memory of the October War (Tishreen War in Arabic).

In the beginning, the university only had 3 faculties, Arabic literature, science, and agriculture, and an enrollment of 983 students during the 1970s. However, that number has grown to more than 70,000 students, making Tishreen University the third largest in Syria, with the number of its faculties increasing from 3 to 21.

Many internally displaced students enrolled at the university after the outbreak of the Syrian Civil War.

After the fall of the Assad regime, interim Prime Minister Mohammed al-Bashir of the Syrian caretaker government renamed the university to "Latakia University" on December 25, 2024.

== Staff ==
=== Academic staff ===
The academic staff of the University consists of:

- Faculty Members: 892.
- Higher Education Instructors: 24.
- Members of the Technical Staff: 133.
- Teaching Assistants: 598.
- Engineers: 420.

=== Administrative and laboratory staff ===
- Laboratory Workers: 240.
- Administrative Employees: 1,119.

== Faculties ==
- Faculty of Arts and Humanities: Opened in 1971.
- Faculty of Agriculture: Opened in 1971.
- Faculty of Science: Opened in 1971.
- Faculty of Civil Engineering: 1972.
- Faculty of Medicine: Opened in 1974.
- Faculty of Mechanical and Electrical Engineering: Opened in 1980.
- Faculty of Dentistry: Opened in 1983.
- Faculty of Architecture: 1984.
- Faculty of Economics: Opened in 1986.
- Faculty of Pharmacy: Opened in 1990.
- Faculty of Nursing: Opened in 1994.
- Faculty of Physical Education: 1995.
- Faculty of Education: Opened in 1997.
- Faculty of Informatics: Opened in 2000.
- Faculty of Technical engineering in 2002.
- Faculty of Information and communication technology engineering: opened in 2008.
- Faculty of Law

== Intermediate institutes and vocational schools ==
- Intermediate Institute of Agriculture: Opened in 1974.
- Intermediate Institute of Engineering: Opened in 1979.
- Intermediate Institute of Medicine: Opened in 1979.
- Intermediate Institute of Commerce: Opened in 1980.
- Intermediate Institute of Administration Skills: Opened in 1995.
- Intermediate Institute of Computer Engineering: Opened in 1998.
- Nursing School: Opened in 1980.

== See also ==
- List of Islamic educational institutions
