= Barmada =

Barmada (Arabic: برمدا) is a surname. It is a prominent family originally from Aleppo, Syria. Etymologically, Barmada appears to mean 'Son of the fugitive' in Aramaic. Additionally it has also been interpreted as translating to 'Son of the wanderer'. It was adopted by the family when they settled in a village named 'Barmada' in Harem (A town near Aleppo), after migrating from Kurdish regions. The first members of the Barmada/Al-Barmada family were Hasan Agha, Husayn Agha, and Ahmad Agha, all sons of Mustafa Agha. They had originally belonged to the Al-Barazi tribal federation before being forced to move from Suruj to multiple destinations, eventually settling in Harem. Descendants are present in the US, Switzerland, France, Italy, Lebanon, Saudi Arabia, the United Kingdom, etc.

- Abdul Qader Barmada (1911–2000), Syrian politician
- Mustafa Bey Barmada (1883–1953), Syrian statesman and politician
- Rashad Barmada (1913–1988), Syrian statesman and politician
- Riad Barmada (1929–2014), Syrian-American orthopedic surgeon
- Michael Barmada (1969–2016), American geneticist
- Sami J Barmada (born 1976), American neuroscientist
- Shahd Barmada (born 1988), Syrian singer
