= Wafic Saïd =

Syrian businessman and philanthropist (born 1939)

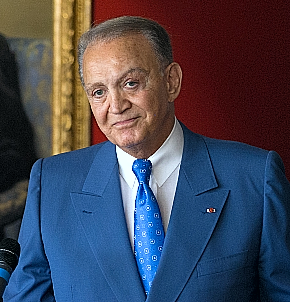
- Born: 21 December 1939 (age 86); Damascus, Syria
- Citizenship: Syrian, Saudi, Canadian
- Occupation: Businessman
- Years active: 1959–present
- Known for: Saïd Foundation; Al-Yamamah arms deal The University of Oxford's; Saïd Business School
- Spouse: Rosemary Thompson (m. 1969)
- Awards: Sheldon Medal, University of Oxford; Grand Commandeur Ordre de Mérite du Cèdre of Lebanon and Ordre de Mérite of Morocco
- Website: waficsaid.com

Wafic Rida Saïd (Arabic: وفيق رضا سعيد) (born 21 December 1939) is a Syrian-Saudi Arabian businessman, financier, and philanthropist who has resided for many years in Monaco.

Saïd lived in Syria, the country of his birth, until his early twenties, when he left for Switzerland and worked as a banker, before making his fortune in the Saudi Arabian construction industry in the 1970s. He came to public prominence after helping facilitate the Al-Yamamah arms deal between the United Kingdom and Saudi Arabia in the 1980s. He established the Saïd Foundation in 1982 and the Saïd Business School at the University of Oxford in 1996 with an initial £20 million donation. Saïd owns several properties worldwide, including Tusmore Park in Oxfordshire.

== Early life and education ==
Saïd was born in Damascus, Syria, in 1939 to a prominent Syrian family. Saïd's grandfather had served in the Turkish army during the Ottoman period, reaching the rank of general and was a colonial governor of Ottoman Syria.

Saïd was the youngest son of Rida Saïd, a prominent Syrian ophthalmologist who was the Syrian Minister for Higher Education and who had founded the Syrian University in Damascus in 1926 on the request of then King of Iraq Faisal.

Saïd's father died when he was still a child, and after initial schooling by Jesuits in Beirut, Lebanon, Saïd studied at the Institute of Bankers in London.

Saïd had been offered a place at the University of Cambridge, but was unable to take up the place as a result of political instability in Syria in which his family's assets were sequestrated.

Saïd finally left Syria amidst the 1963 Syrian coup d'état. Saïd described the atmosphere in Syria at the time as being similar to 'the Terror in the French Revolution' in which 'young men were being rounded up.'

In Switzerland Saïd worked for the Union de Banque Suisse (now UBS), and later the Banque Commerciale Arabe SA, before his return to England.

== Business career ==
=== Early Ventures ===
Saïd established two restaurants serving Middle Eastern cuisine in London in 1967, including Caravanserai on Kensington High Street, the restaurants were sold in 1969.

=== Saudi Construction ===
Saïd moved to Saudi Arabia in 1969. Saudi Arabia lacked much modern infrastructure at the time, and large infrastructure projects were subsequently funded by the rising price of oil in the early 1970s. During this period of time, he founded and invested in companies that supported large-scale government infrastructural projects, including airports, desalination plants, housing, and hospitals.

In the 1960s, Saïd became acquainted with the Saudi Arabian princes Bandar and Khalid, sons of Prince Sultan, who was the brother of King Fahd and would later become the Saudi defence minister. Princes Bandar and Khalid would later serve as the Saudi Arabian ambassador to the United States and co-commander of Allied forces in the Gulf War, respectively.

Following his acquaintance with Akram Ojjeh, a fellow Syrian financier and the founder of the TAG Group, Saïd established TAG Systems Constructions SA, a civil engineering and telecommunications business, which he chaired.

=== Al-Yamamah contract ===
Saïd helped facilitate the al-Yamamah deal between the British and Saudi governments in the 1980s. The al-Yamamah deal is the biggest export deal in British history and has generated £43 billion in revenue for the British company BAE Systems.

Jonathan Aitken in his 2013 book, Margaret Thatcher: Power and Personality claims that Saïd became involved in the deal at a dinner party hosted in honour of Richard Nixon at which Saïd met the Defence Secretary Michael Heseltine, who told him of his optimism that Britain would secure a large defence contract for BAE Hawk aircraft with Saudi Arabia. Saïd told Heseltine of his scepticism of the deal's success, and he was later approached by James Blyth, the Ministry of Defence's head of defence sales. Blyth asked Saïd about the progress of the deal and Prince Bandar reported from his father, Prince Sultan that he had signed a letter of intent with the French government instead of the British. Saïd informed Thatcher who impressed upon him the historic ties between Britain and Saudi Arabia, which appealed to the Pro-British Prince Bandar and Saïd.

The Daily Telegraph has described Saïd as a 'key fixer' who 'helped broker' the deal, with the Guardian describing Said as the 'fixer at the heart' of the deal. A 2007 statement issued by Saïd on the al-Yamamah deal said that he had "...never been the 'business manager' for anybody, let alone any member of the Saudi Royal Family".

Saïd's association with Thatcher's son, Mark Thatcher, has been perceived as having played an important role in Britain securing the al-Yamamah deal. However, Aitken dismisses the belief that Mark Thatcher was pivotal to the deal. Aitken emphasises the role of Margaret's husband, Denis Thatcher as the intermediary between her and Prince Bandar with the assistance of Dick Evans.

Saïd's role in al-Yamamah has led to him being labelled as an arms dealer, a term that he rejects. In 2001 Saïd said that the deal '... brought a huge boost to British industry: you are talking about thousands of jobs. But for some reason, which I cannot understand, the press want to portray this as a shady, mysterious deal ... Quite honestly, I thought I was doing this country a favour; I have never even sold a penknife. I was not paid a penny [for advising British Aerospace] but I benefited because the project led to construction in Saudi Arabia that involved my companies.'

The Guardian newspaper wrote that from the proceeds of al-Yamamah '[British] Police later calculated that more than £6bn may have been distributed in corrupt commissions, via an array of agents and middlemen'. In June 2007, the BBC's Panorama alleged BAE Systems had paid Prince Bandar "hundreds of millions of pounds" in return for his role in the al-Yamamah deals. Turki bin Nasser was also a recipient of money from BAE.

Mark Thatcher and Saïd have both denied allegations of commissions from the Saudi government. Saïd responded to the allegations stating that he has never 'distributed commissions' to any member of the Saudi Royal Family".

An investigation into the al-Yamamah deal was opened by the British Serious Fraud Office (SFO) and later closed for reasons of national security after the Saudi Arabian government had threatened to withhold cooperation on anti-terrorist issues. No individual was ever prosecuted in the investigation.

Companies linked to Saïd acquired properties in Belgravia and Mayfair that were 'put at the service' of Thatcher and Dick Evans, the BAE chief executive after the al-Yamamah deal according to The Guardian.

=== Saïd Holdings and Other Investments ===
In 1987, Saïd founded Saïd Holdings Limited (SHL), a private international investment firm based in Bermuda. The company manages a diversified portfolio including private equity, quoted and unquoted securities, and real estate. Saïd now serves on the board of directors.

Saïd owned almost 50% of British Mediterranean Airways, and loaned the airline £8 million before its 2007 sale to BMI.

In 1995 Saïd co-founded Sagitta Asset Management, which handled his family's wealth and the assets of other ultra high-net-worth individuals and their families, it was sold to Fleming Family & Partners in 2005.

Saïd also invested in the merchant bank established by Jonathan Aitken, Aitken Hume, and invested £5 million in the short-lived Sunday Correspondent newspaper. In the United States, Saïd invested in the National Bank of Washington and Garfinckel's stores.

In 2009, Saïd Holdings acquired 5 Churchill Place, the twelve-storey Canary Wharf office building formerly occupied by Bear Stearns and subsequently by JP Morgan, from Canary Wharf Group for £208 million. It sold the building to Shenzhen-based Cheung Kei Group in 2017 for £270 million.

In 2018, Saïd backer Ellerman Hotel Company's acquisition of the leasehold of The Beaumont, a hotel in Mayfair, London, and became director of Beaumont Hotel (Midco) Limited.

Saïd is the sole owner of Al Shams Investments Limited, an investment company incorporated in Bermuda in December 2020. Al Shams is the largest shareholder in Braemar Hotels & Resorts, a New York-listed hotel real estate investment trust.

Mr Said is the founder and owner of Ezidhar Holding. In April 2026, the Syrian Ministry of Tourism announced the Beaumont, a mixed-used development in Damascus to be delivered under a fifty-year joint venture with Ezidhar Holding at an estimated cost of $250 to £300 million.

=== Ambassadorship ===
Saïd was ambassador and head of the delegation of St Vincent and the Grenadines to UNESCO from 1996 to 2018. Saïd also previously served as St Vincent and the Grenadines ambassador to the Holy See.

== Philanthropy ==
=== Saïd Foundation and Scholarships ===
The Karim Rida Saïd Foundation was established in 1982 by Wafic and Rosemary Saïd in memory of their son. It was renamed the Saïd Foundation in 2008. It is registered in England under Charity number 1073096.

Since 1984, the Scholarships Programme has offered scholarships and training opportunities for talented young Syrians, Jordanians, Lebanese and Palestinians, mainly to study in the UK, to enable them to acquire skills that will bring benefits to others in their countries of origin. To date, the Foundation has funded scholarships for almost 900 students from these countries.

In 1993 the Foundation established the Child Development Programme (CDP) with the aim of supporting Jordanian, Lebanese and Palestinian community-based organisations to develop and deliver good quality and sustainable care services for disabled children and education in areas of greatest need. The CDP has funded more than 250 project grants since its start, reaching tens of thousands of children.

The Saïd Foundation also supports the Saïd Business School at the University of Oxford.

In recent years, the Foundation has made grants to leading healthcare and medical research institutions in the UK and overseas. These include: a £5 million donation to Great Ormond Street Hospital to support the development of a new children’s cancer centre at the hospital; a £3.33 million grant to establish a Saïd Professorship of Vaccinology at the University of Oxford; and a £3 million grant to support a research initiative into age-related macular degeneration at University College London’s Institute of Ophthalmology.

=== Syria ===
Saïd claims that his "experiences in exile, and in witnessing the difficulties faced by people who did not get the opportunity to flee the country at the time, developed into a deep commitment to supporting the people of Syria".

In 1996, the Foundation established the first Disability Programme in Syria, opening an office in 2001 to directly implement the Programme. The office became a locally registered charity in Syria in 2012, the Saïd Foundation for Development. The programme worked to strengthen the professional capacity of disability practitioners and organisations, raising awareness of disability, developing a cadre of national trainers in disability-related fields and supporting or providing services for children with disabilities (and their families), especially in marginalised communities.

Since late 2011, the Saïd Foundation has been providing support for non-political organisations that are delivering emergency humanitarian assistance, including shelters, medical care and schooling, to Syrians most affected by the crisis, whether refugees in Lebanon and Jordan or internally displaced within Syria itself.

The Saïd Foundation has partnered with the UN Refugee Agency's (UNHCR), the International Rescue Committee (IRC), and Save the Children to support their work with Syrian refugees in Jordan and Lebanon. Since 2014, the foundation has supported the UNHCR's work in improving access to university education through its support of the DAFI scholarship programme. The Saïd Foundation became the largest donor to the programme and has supported six cohorts of students, enabling over 400 Syrian refugees in Lebanon and Jordan to complete their university education.

After the collapse of the Assad regime in 2024, the Syrian charity has been able to restart its projects inside Syria. Its plans included a centre for excellence in teaching and learning at Damascus University and a non-for-profit hospital in Damascus.

Saïd assisted the future Syrian president Bashar al-Assad with securing a place in Britain to study ophthalmology in 1992, and was acquainted with the Anglo-Syrian family of Assad's wife, Asma al-Assad (née Akhras).

In a 2012 interview with Charles Moore in The Spectator, Saïd said that he had found Bashar '...civilised, nice, polished', and that he admired Asma as 'a caring person'. At the time, Saïd welcomed Bashar's ascension to the Presidency of Syria following the death of his father, Hafez al-Assad, feeling it was Syria's 'only salvation'. Saïd supported Bashar's stated aims to 'reform the legal system, revoke the [now 50-year-old] emergency laws, and fight corruption.'

Saïd helped introduce Western politicians and businesspeople to Syria, and helped push for political reform in the country. Visiting Syria in 2011 at the advent of the Syrian uprisings in response to the Arab Spring, Saïd told Asma that 'the winds of change are contagious. Please tell the President to promise free elections. He must be the champion of change.'

Saïd was appalled by the resulting Syrian Civil War and was asked to meet Bashar al-Assad in June 2011 as he wished to gauge Western views of the conflict. Saïd implored Assad to enact promised reforms and to engage with his political opponents. Saïd welcomed the Arab Spring and wished for a secular government in Egypt modelled on that of Turkey's.

In 2017, Saïd criticised the decision by U.S. President Donald Trump to introduce temporary orders banning refugees in general and indefinite bans targeting all people from Iran, Iraq, Libya, Somalia, Sudan, Syria, and Yemen.

In total, it has pledged over US$1.8 million to the UN Refugee Agency (UNHCR) for university scholarships for Syrian refugees in Jordan and Lebanon.

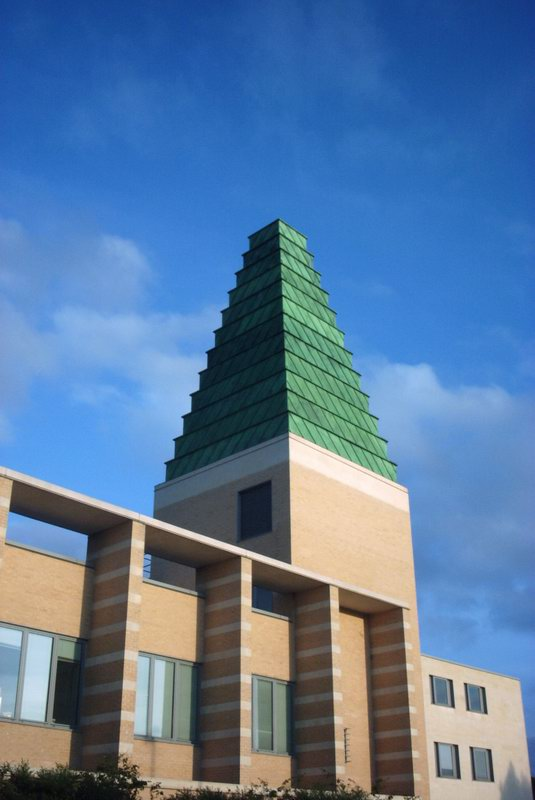
The copper covered ziggurat of the Saïd Business School

=== Saïd Business School ===
In July 1996, it was announced that Saïd had donated £20 million to the University of Oxford to found a business school. Saïd had agreed to donate the money after the university had voted in 1990 for the creation of a business school, and needed funds of £40 million. Opposition initially arose to the school due to the lack of a suitable site and the nature of management as an academic discipline, and Saïd said that he would reconsider his gift after a potential site on a sports ground at Mansfield Road in Oxford was voted against. The new building for the school opened in August 2001, designed by Edward Jones and Jeremy Dixon. It was accompanied by protests over Saïd's role in the Al-Yamamah arms deal. A new building at the school, the Thatcher Business Education Centre was opened by The Prince of Wales in 2013 and named by Prime Minister David Cameron in 2014 in the presence of Saïd and his wife, Rosemary. Nelson Mandela visited the Saïd Business School at the invitation of Saïd in 2002, to open the lecture theatre named in his honour.

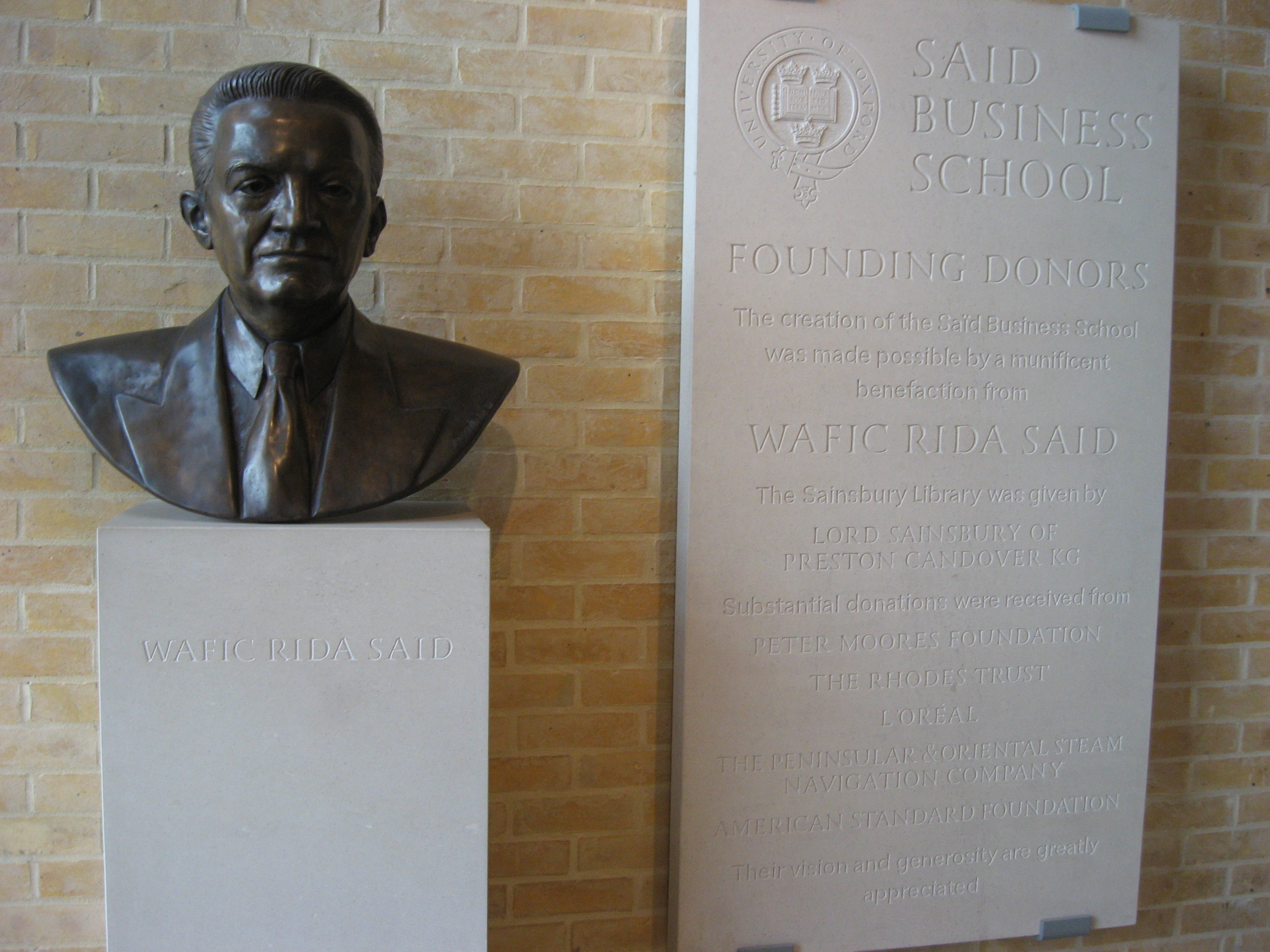
Bust of Wafic Saïd by Michael Rizzello at the Saïd Business School, Oxford

Saïd had donated over £70 million to the school by 2014, and he is a member of the University of Oxford's Chancellor's Court of Benefactors. The court consists of the largest individual donors to Oxford, and meets annually with senior officials from the university. Saïd's philanthropic efforts for the university have seen him honoured with the Sheldon Medal, the highest honour that Oxford bestows upon its benefactors. The Sheldon Medal is awarded annually to a member of the Chancellor's Court of Benefactors that has 'made a strategic difference to the life of the university'. A bust of Saïd by Michael Rizzello stands at the entrance to the Saïd Business School, it was one of the last works sculpted by Rizzello before his death in 2004.

=== Other donations ===
Saïd has significantly donated to St Mary's Hospital in Paddington, London, The Prince of Wales's Charitable Foundation, Eton College, and the Royal Shakespeare Company. He also donated £250,000 to the victims of the 7 July 2005 London bombings. He is the founding donor of the Wafic Saïd Molecular Cardiology Research Laboratories at the Texas Heart Institute.

== Relationship with Margaret Thatcher ==
Saïd was a passionate supporter of the British Conservative Prime Minister Margaret Thatcher, and said of the effect of her premiership after the Winter of Discontent that 'We found we couldn't rely on British manufacturers any more. Then here she comes, this lioness. The honour of England is challenged in the Falklands and she sends an armada! She fights the most powerful union and defeats it.' and said that 'for me, her friendship is the biggest medal'.

Saïd was a significant donor to Thatcher's Conservatives in the 1980s, donating at least £350,000 during her premiership. Saïd can no longer donate to British political parties due to his foreign citizenship. Saïd's wife, Rosemary, donated £580,000 to the Conservatives between 2012 and 2014, and Saïd's daughter, Rasha, was recorded as having given four donations totalling £47,000 to the Conservatives in 2008, but these were later explained as having come from her mother, after being incorrectly reported by the Conservatives to the Electoral Commission. The Sunday Times had reported that she had asked her parents to donate to the party on her behalf, and that some of the money had come from them, but her father said that she was mistaken as she could not afford to make such a donation.

Saïd is close friends with Charles Powell, the former chief foreign affairs adviser to Thatcher. Saïd appointed Powell chairman of his Sagitta Asset Management in 2001, and Powell chairs the Saïd Business School Foundation.

== Personal life ==
In 1969, Saïd married Rosemary Thompson, whom he had met in Switzerland, and they had three children together; two sons, Karim and Khaled, and a daughter, Rasha.

In 1981, their son Karim died in an accident at the home of Prince Sultan in Saudi Arabia. Saïd was attending a ceremony at the prince's house at the time to receive Saudi citizenship by royal decree. To honour his son Saïd established the Karim Rida Saïd Foundation to help disadvantaged children and young people of the Middle East.

In March 2016, Saïd was told by British banking firm Barclays that he could no longer bank with them, despite having been a long-standing customer; the BBC reported that "The bank is understood to be concerned about holding accounts that are linked to what are described as 'high-risk countries'". In response, Saïd said he would be taking legal action against Barclays. Saïd dropped the lawsuit after the bank publicly apologized to him in June 2016.

In 1992, Saïd won a unanimous verdict in a libel case in the British high court, and was awarded £400,000 in damages. The case concerned letters that had been published alleging that Saïd was untrustworthy. Saïd described the letters as "humiliating and untrue", and that the allegations in the letters had caused him "tremendous damage".

Saïd's wealth was estimated at £2 billion by the Sunday Times Rich List in 2020.

=== Art collecting ===
Saïd is a noted collector of Impressionist art, having owned paintings by Pierre Auguste Renoir, Claude Monet, Paul Cézanne, and paintings of sporting scenes. Saïd put 11 paintings from his collection up for auction at Phillips in New York in 2000, among the paintings that sold were Renoir's Women in the Garden (1873) and Girl in a Flowered Hat (1896), Pissarro's September Festival, Pontoise (1872) and Cézanne's Hill of Galet, Pontoise (1879–80).

In 1982 Saïd paid a record £80,000 at auction for a Quran that had been made for Qaitbay, the 15th-century Egyptian sultan in 1488. The Quran was for a period displayed at the newly constructed Regent's Park Mosque in London.

In 1987 Saïd acquired 20 pieces from the auction of the jewellery collection of Wallis Simpson, including the famous panther bracelet, the cross bracelet and the flamingo brooch by Cartier. All these were later sold at an auction in 2010.

=== Horse racing ===
Saïd was a prominent racehorse owner, having owned the Henry Cecil trained horses Bosra Sham and Lady Carla. Lady Carla was named after Carla Powell, the socialite wife of Charles Powell.

Bosra Sham won the 1996 1,000 Guineas and Champion Stakes under Said's racing colours. Borsa Sham was the highest-rated horse in Europe and North America over a mile and a quarter in the 1996 international classification.

Saïd's Sagitta Asset Management sponsored the 1,000 and 2,000 Guinea Stakes, and having ended their sponsorship in 2003, Saïd withdrew his racing interests, citing his non-residence in England as the reason.

=== Film production ===
Saïd was an executive producer of the 1987 film The Fourth Protocol, based on Frederick Forsyth's novel of the same name. Saïd funded half the film's budget of £3.5 million due to his love of Forsyth's novel.

=== Property ===
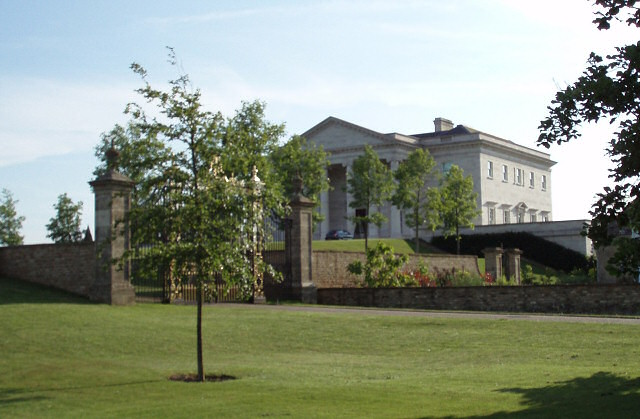
Tusmore House

Saïd family trusts own two homes in the United Kingdom, a £10 million property in Eaton Square in London's Belgravia district, which when bought in 1992, was then the highest price paid for an apartment in the United Kingdom, and Tusmore Park, a 3,000 acre estate near Bicester in Oxfordshire. Tusmore Park is near Prince Bandar's 2,000 acre Glympton Park estate. In 2012 Saïd erected a 92 ft limestone obelisk topped with gold in the grounds of Tusmore Park to honour the Diamond Jubilee of Elizabeth II. The obelisk is the largest constructed in the United Kingdom since the 18th century. Margaret Thatcher frequently visited Saïd at Tusmore Park, staying for long periods in Tusmore Park's Clock House in the last years of her life. Saïd rebuilt Tusmore House in 2000 to an English Palladian design by Sir William Whitfield. In 2004 the Georgian Group gave the completed house its award for the "best new building in the Classical tradition".

Saïd also owns homes in Marbella in Spain, France, Saudi Arabia, and Syria. Saïd is officially resident in the tax haven of Monaco.

=== Awards ===
Sheldon Medal, University of Oxford; Grand Commandeur Ordre de Mérite du Cèdre of Lebanon and Ordre de Mérite of Morocco.

Saïd is a Foundation Fellow of Somerville College, Oxford.
