= Rida Said =

Syrian doctor (1876–1945)

- رضا سعيد
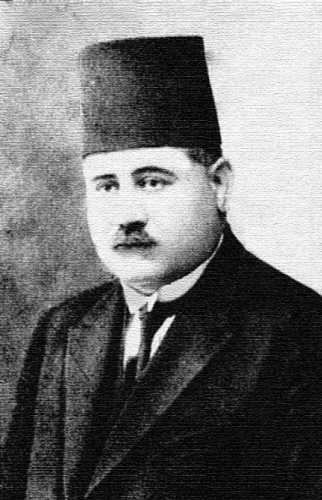
- Born: 1876; Damascus, Ottoman Syria
- Died: October 28, 1945 (aged 68–69); Damascus, Mandatory Syrian Republic
- Occupations: President of the Syrian University; Mayor of Damascus; Chief physician of the Syrian Railways
- Children: Wafic Said

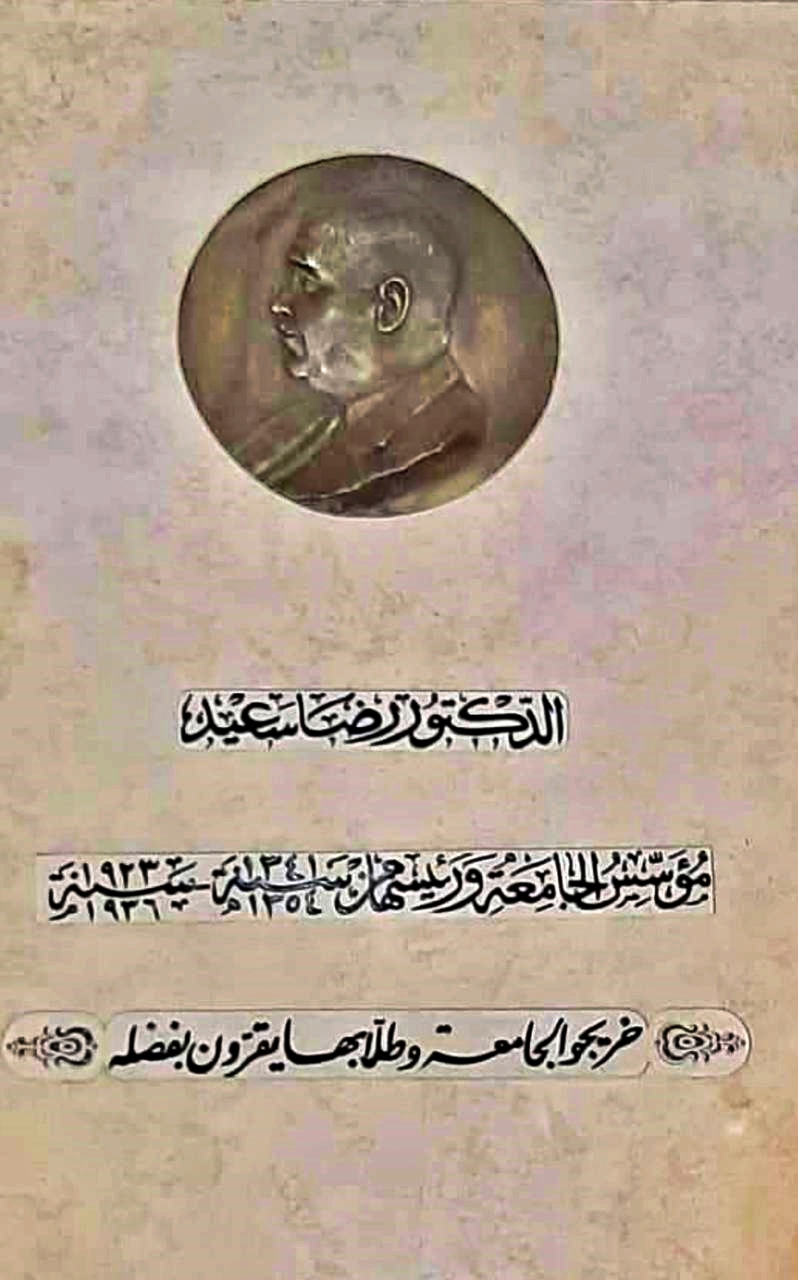
Plaque in honor of Said at Damascus University

Rida Said al-Aytouni (Arabic: رضا سعيد الأيتوني ALA-LC: Riḍā Saʻīd al-Aytūnī; 1876 – 28 October 1945), was a Syrian eye surgeon and ophthalmologist and the leading educational reformer of Syria in the early 20th century. After World War I he reinstated the Arab Medical School in Damascus, becoming its first Dean and linking it to the National Hospital. Under the French mandate, Said founded the Syrian University (modern-day Damascus University) in 1923, becoming its first President.

He continued his medical practice as an ophthalmologist all his life. After serving as Minister of Education and as President of Damascus University his ground-breaking reforms caused him to be widely known as "the founder of modern education in Syria".

== Early life ==
Born in Damascus in 1876 to a well off family, Said's primary and secondary education was at Rashidiya Military School in Damascus. He continued his education at the Military Medical School in Istanbul where after graduating in 1902 and was appointed assistant to the Professor of Ophthalmology. He was then promoted to Head of Medical Ward in 1908 with the rank of Agassi, or "Major" in the army of the Ottoman Empire.

In 1909, he was sent to the Hôtel-Dieu in Paris where he studied for his degree under Professor Félix de Lapersonne who was head of the Department of Ophthalmology.

After being awarded with a degree and winning a research fellowship as a "Moniteur" Said’s abilities were regarded as so exceptional that Lapersonne appointed him to be his Principal Assistant in all his eye surgery operations.

He returned to Damascus in 1913, and started practicing as an ophthalmologist, which at that time was called a kaḥḥāl. A year after his return, he served as Chief Medical Officer for the Hijazi Railway and soon after appointed Director of the Syrian Railways. In 1917 he was elected as Mayor of Damascus during a period of significant and historical world events such as World War I which began in 1914 in addition to the beginning of the Arab Renaissance, which had been expanding and gaining traction since the beginning of the last century. During the period Said served as Mayor, Damascus suffered a great famine lasting many years and as Mayor worked hard to ease the suffering of the people.

After Faisal I took office in Syria, Said met with the King in Aleppo and endeavoured to convince him to reopen all scientific institutes closed because of the war. This was agreed and In 1919, he was able to establish the first medical school in Damascus and the world that teaches in Arabic which in 1920 became known as the Arab Medical Institute to which he was elected dean.

== Contribution to Syrian education ==
Said launched new medical departments at the institute, including a department for the study of nursing and midwifery; with further departments established soon after for pharmacy and dentistry, thus creating the building blocks of an Academic School in Damascus. He also presented to students and specialists a translation from a French book entitled Research in Ophthalmology for Trainees—one of the most important references of Ophthalmology at the time. In addition to this, he continued to push the teaching team to "arabise" medical terms. Most importantly, Said succeeded in persuading the French occupation authorities not to close the Institute and began to work on its expansion, defying the difficult political, economic and military conditions of the occupation.

He succeeded in establishing the Syrian University (modern-day Damascus University) in 1923 and became its first President. He worked on the qualification of its scientific and administrative staff and opened the way to the establishment of the Institute of Law, becoming the first academic law school department in the Arab world. The University persisted in teaching in Arabic, despite academic and political difficulties, thus making it the first and only university in the world to study science in Arabic.

== Arabization of the Institute of Medicine in Damascus ==
After the end of the World War I and the withdrawal of the Ottoman forces from Damascus, an Arab government was formed headed by Prince Faisal bin al-Hussein, son of Sharif Hussein bin Ali, the leader of the Great Arab Revolt against the Ottomans. The prince met with a delegation of Syrian doctors, who asked him to reopen the Ottoman Medical Institute in the Baramkeh neighborhood, which had been closed due to the circumstances of the war. Faisal accepted their request and ordered the institute to reopen on January 23, 1919, after its name changed to become the Institute of Arab Medicine. A small committee of prominent doctors was formed, with the aim of Arabizing curricula and converting them from the Turkish language into Arabic. Said chaired this committee, which included Abd al-Rahman Shahbandar, a graduate of the American University of Beirut, Dr. Ahmad Munif al-Aidi, a graduate of the Ottoman Medical Institute in Istanbul, Dr. Murshid Khatir, a graduate of Saint Joseph University in Beirut, Dr. Abd al-Qadir Zahra, one of Sharif Hussein's physicians, and Dr. Mahmoud Hammouda, one of the prominent Damascene doctors in the Hijaz.

== Dean of the Arab Medical Institute ==
Said was appointed Dean of the Institute of Arab Medicine and assigned the Palestinian jurist Abd al-Latif Salah to the Deanship of the Institute of Law, which opened its doors to Syrian students in September 1919, that is, a year after the Ottoman forces had evacuated from Damascus. On the day he assumed the deanship, Said searched for local doctors to fill the gap in the educational staff, given the travel of all Turkish doctors, so Dr. Mustafa Shawqi (who later became the dean of the Faculty of Medicine) came and appointed him as a teacher of histology and anatomy, and he assigned his friend Dr. Ahmad Munif al-Aidi to teach pediatrics and physiology. The pathology course was assigned to Murshid Khatir. As for Dr. Sami as-Satti (who also became the dean of the faculty after years), he taught internal medicine, and Dr. Ibrahim as-Satti became a specialist in gynecology, and Dr. Jamil al-Khani, a graduate of the Ottoman Medical Institute, taught dermatology, at the time that Professor Abd al-Wahhab worked Channels and Shawkat surgeon on the advancement of the Department of Chemistry. Dr. Michel Shamandi taught herbal medicine, and Dr. Ahmad Hamdi al-Khayyat, a graduate of the French Pasteur Institute, taught microbiology.

== Minister of Education and President of the Syrian University ==
In 1924, Said took over the Ministry of Education in the first Syrian government, formed under the French mandate by President Subhi Bey Barakat but he resigned after the beginning of the Great Syrian Revolt. In 1925, Said returned to his position as President of the University, and continued his efforts to gain recognition of the Syrian secondary certificate (which was eventually recognised in 1929) as well as the French baccalaureate as a condition of entry to the university. His great ambition was to strengthen and raise the level of the Syrian University, especially in the field of medicine, to compete with the French and American medical institutes in Beirut.

In 1936, Said requested from the first president of the Mandatory Syrian Republic, Muhammad Ali Bey al-Abid, to approve his retirement from the presidency of the university. This resulted in the President issuing a presidential decree.

== Death ==
Said died on 28 October 1945 in Damascus and was buried there. Syria bid farewell to a scientific and patriotic figure, who earned enormous respect for his great achievements including his efforts to establish the Syrian University. Years later the Syrian University placed his name on the main street adjacent to Damascus University in the centre of the capital.

His son is the international businessman and philanthropist Wafic Said.

== Memorials and honors ==
Rida Said Conference Centre was named after him.

== Decorations ==
During his life and career, he was awarded many honours and medals including the Ottoman Order of Merit, the Majidi Medal, the Ottoman War Medal, the Iron Crown Medal from the Government of Austria, the Paris Medal in the French Legion of Honour and the Commandor Medal, the Egyptian Medal of Knowledge, the Red Cross Medal and the Syrian Order of Excellence.

- Ottoman Order of Merit
- Medal Majidi, the Ottoman War Medal
- Iron Crown Medal from the Government of Austria
- Medal of Paris in the French Legion of Honour
- Commander Medal
- Egyptian Knowledge Medal
- Red Cross Medal
- Syrian Order of Merit, of the excellent class
