= Faculty of Medicine, Damascus University =

Medical school of Damascus University

Coordinates: 33°30′25″N 36°16′01″E

Damascus University – Faculty of Medicine
- كلية الطب البشري في جامعة دمشق
- Seal of the Faculty of Medicine
- Type: Public
- Established: 1903
- Dean: Prof. Soubhi Al Bahri
- Location: Damascus, Syria
- Website: damascusuniversity.edu.sy/med

The Faculty of Medicine of Damascus University (Arabic: كلية الطب البشري في جامعة دمشق) is the oldest university college in Syria, founded in 1903. Under Faisal I it was called the Arab Medical School.

== History ==
In 1901, the Ottoman authorities founded the Turkish Medical Institute in Damascus. An iradé of Sultan Abdülhamid II of 27 April 1903 transformed it into an imperial faculty of medicine. The language of instruction was Ottoman Turkish. The school moved to Beirut temporarily during World War I. With the collapse of the Ottoman Empire following that war, the school was brought back to Damascus and renamed the Arab Medical School, and the language of instruction was changed to Arabic.

For both the civilian and the military hospitals of the city of Damascus Medical Institute, Rida Said was elected chairman in 1920. In 1924 the publication of the Medical Journal of the Arab Institute began. On average, half of the students were non-Syrian. In the 1950s over half the doctors in the Mashreq were graduates of the institute.

The university widened its remit after the evacuation of the French in 1946. The Institute began faculties of medicine. The college issued a doctor of medicine, bachelor of pharmacy, doctor of dental medicine and a certificate in nursing and midwifery in obstetrics. Successive reforms after 1946 have expanded the school and increased the number of students. An act promulgated in 1958 during the unity of Egypt and Syria amended the Syrian name to the University of Damascus.

== Scientific research ==
The College of Medicine adopts a strategy of scientific research by the Ministry of Higher Education in cooperation with various governmental bodies. Contributing members of the faculty in the College of Medicine are an important part of science activities as established annually by the Supreme Council for Science of the Ministry of Higher Education. The research presented in the course of medical researchers, as well as new faculty members are allowed access to translated research acquired through doctorates from the university to the Arab world. This translation is provided with identity cards required with faculty membership. This is important in the Arabization of science and research: It is believed research in the mother tongue should be accessible to a large segment of beneficiaries. In the scientific research of faculty of medicine at Damascus University, there are improving of the oncology research. The cancer and oncology research at faculty of medicine increases during Syrian crisis.

== University hospitals and educational facilities ==
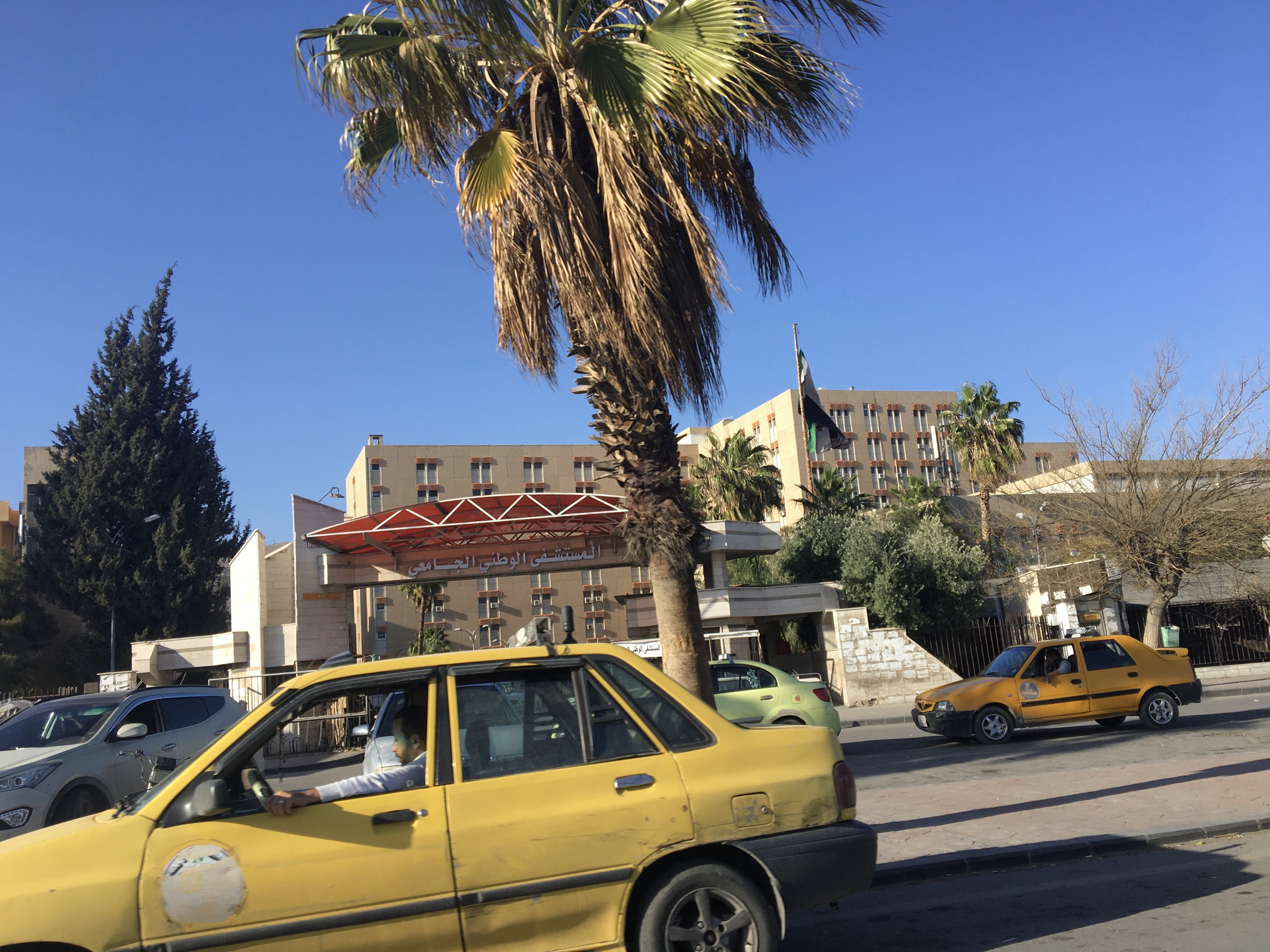
The picture of the syrian National University Hospital in Damascus

There are 6 main University Hospitals that are run by the Ministry of Higher Education and are affiliated with the University of Damascus; Al Mouwasat University Hospital, National University Hospital, Children's University Hospital, Dermatology Hospital, Al-Bayrouni Cancer Center and the Obstetrics and Gynecology Hospital. All hospitals are within near distance to the campus. These Hospitals are government owned facilities that provide free health-care, and also serve as the training sites for Medical students attending Damascus University and the Higher Studies Residents, in addition to those attending the other Nursing and Medical institutes at the University of Damascus.

Al Mouwasat University Hospital was established in 1958, is mainly composed of 4 buildings; Administration Building, Emergency And Out-Patient Clinics Building and the Physician Residence Building, alongside those building there is the Cardiovascular Surgery Building. According to the Hospital's own statistics published on its website; the working team consists of 1700 Doctors and 3.500 Nurses.

National University Hospital in Damascus, is one of the largest teaching hospitals in Syria, with 645 beds. It was founded in 1988 and is run by the Ministry of Higher Education. The hospital is affiliated with Damascus University. The hospital includes all internal specialties (cardiac, neurological, gastrointestinal kidney..) and most of the surgical specialties (general, endoscopic, vascular, cardiac, neurosurgery, urosurgery), in addition to kidney transplant unit. There is a large division for physiotherapy that covers all the requirements of this therapy.

== Medical School Library ==
The Faculty of Medicine Library has 2 stories. It provides tables and study areas, the upper floor was equipped with computers in 2010 during the establishment of the electronic medical library; the project was not launched, and the upper story remained closed. Many Book-stands offering Arabic, English and French medical journals are present on the periphery of the library. The librarians' office contains textbooks of clinical and sub-clinical sciences available for students to borrow.

== Laboratories and auditoriums ==
The Faculty of Medicine at Damascus University has 3 main buildings; the Dean's/Administration Building, the Laboratory building and the auditorium building. The main labs are the Physiology lab, Pharmacology lab, Biology and cellular science lab, Embryology lab, Genetics labs, Parasitology and Microbiology labs, Forensic Medicine lab and the Pathology lab. Labs are equipped with Microscopes and teaching amenities.

The Auditorium Building has 3 stories, each containing a large auditorium that can accommodate a number of students, estimated number of occupancy capacity is around 1000, these auditoriums serve mainly for teaching rounds and seminars. The "New Auditorium" is in the Dean's building and serves as the main place for conferences and also occasionally utilized for written exams and seminars.

== International recognition ==
- The Faculty of Medicine of Damascus University is listed in the ECFMG notes (under sponsor notes) of the WDOM database of medical schools.
- The Faculty of Medicine of Damascus University was listed in the now discontinued World Health Organization's Avicenna directory.
- The Faculty of Medicine of Damascus University was listed in the now discontinued IMED/FAIMER database of medical schools.

== Notable alumni ==
- Bashar al-Assad - Syrian politician, 19th president of Syria from 17 July 2000 to 8 December 2024
- Riad Barmada (1929-2014) - Syrian-American orthopedics surgeon

== Gallery ==
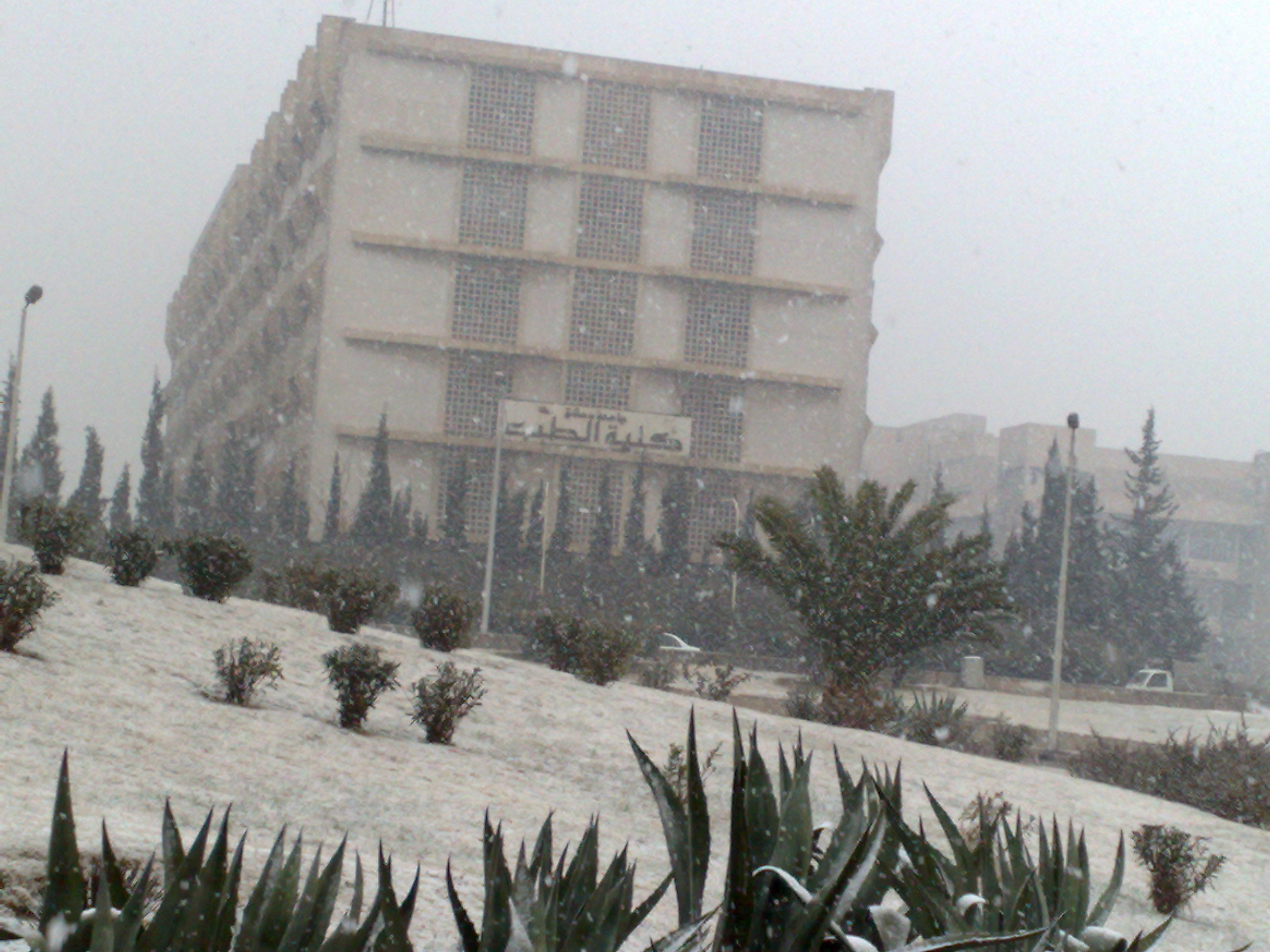
The Faculty of Medicine during snow

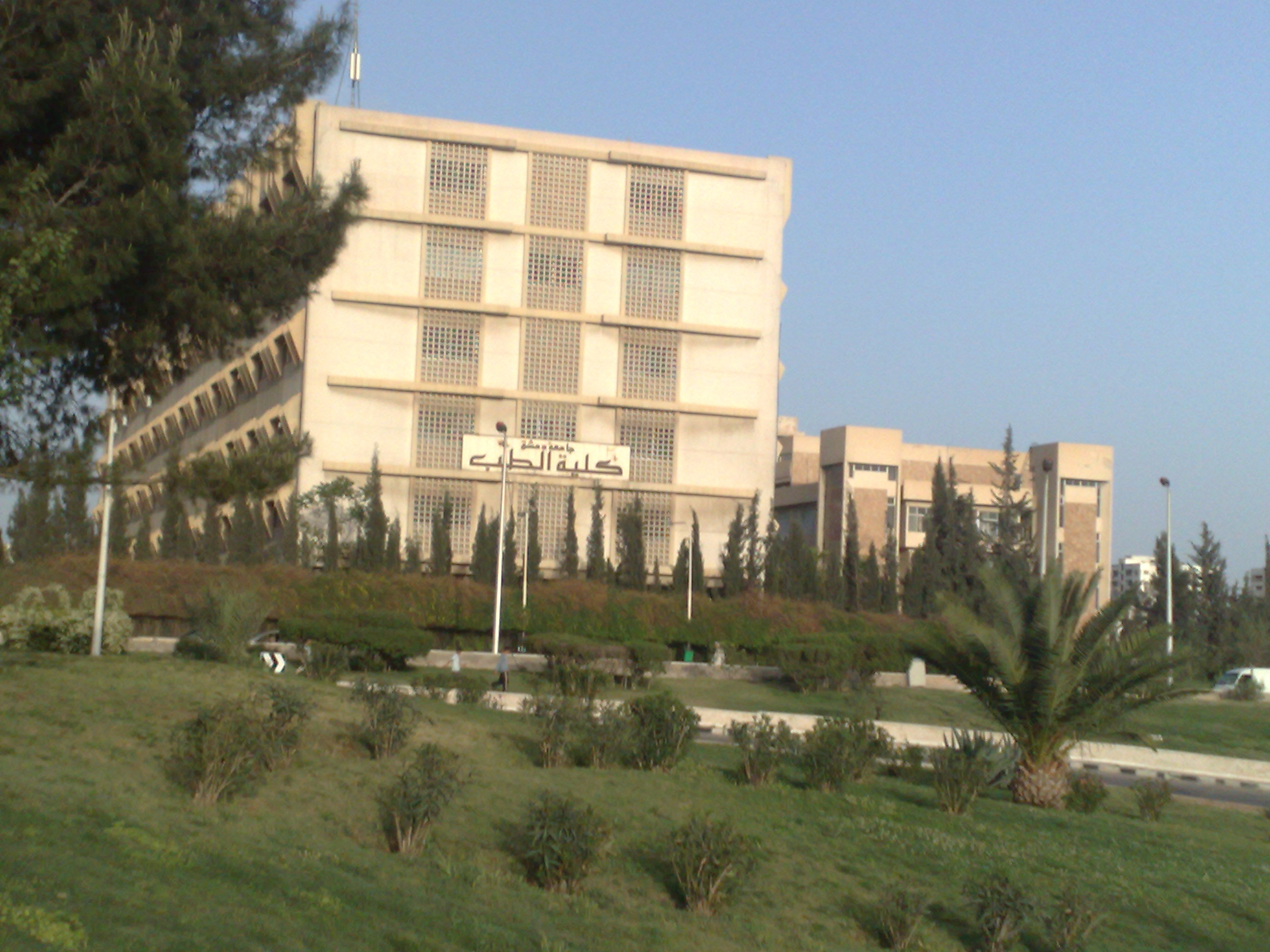
The Faculty of Medicine
