= André Rochon-Duvigneaud =

French ophthalmologist (1863–1952)

André Rochon-Duvigneaud (7 April 1863 – 24 November 1952) was a French ophthalmologist born in Dordogne.

He studied medicine in Bordeaux, and in 1889 became an intern at the Hôtel-Dieu in Paris. In 1892 he earned his doctorate with a thesis on the anatomical angle of the eye's anterior chamber and Schlemm's canal. In 1895 he was appointed chef de clinique. In 1926 he retired from clinical medicine, dedicating himself to comparative studies on the eyes of various animal species. In 1940 he became a member of the Académie de Médecine.

In 1896 he described a neurological disorder characterized by exophthalmos, diplopia, and anaesthesia in regions innervated by the trigeminal nerve, occurring with a traumatic collapse of the superior orbital fissure. At the time he referred to the condition as "sphenoidal fissure syndrome", later to be known as "Rochon-Duvigneaud's syndrome". Also, he is credited with identifying recessive-inherited glaucoma with buphthalmos in New Zealand white rabbits.

== Selected works ==
- Precis iconographique d'anatomie normale de l' œil. Paris: Societe d'Editions Scientifiques, 1895. 136 pages.
- Quelques cas de paralysie de tous les nerfs orbitaires (ophthalmoplegie totale avec amaurosse en anesthésie dans le domaine de l’ophthalmique d’origine syphilitique). Archives d'ophthalmologie, Paris, 1896, 16: 746–760.
- Recherches anatomiques et cliniques sur le glaucome et les neoplasmes intraoculaires. with Photinos Panas. Paris, Masson, 1898. 460 pages. (Anatomical and clinical research on glaucoma and intraocular neoplasms).
- Anatomie de l'appareil nerveux sensorial de la vision : rétine, nerf optique, centres optiques; in Pierre-Félix Lagrange (1857-1928) and Emile Valude (1857-1930) — Encyclopédie française d’ophthalmologie. Paris, 1903–1910. (Anatomy of the sensory nervous apparatus: retina, optic nerve, optical centre).
- Les yeux et le vision des Vertébrés. Paris. Masson et Cie, 1943. 719 pages. (The eyes and vision of vertebrates).
  - Complete list of written works at the French Wikipedia article on André Rochon-Duvigneaud.
