= Sirin Hamsho =

Serene Hamsho
- Born: Sirin Hamsho; 1986 (age 39–40); Hama, Syria
- Education: Massachusetts Institute of Technology, University of Versailles, University of Kalamoon, University of Damascus
- Occupations: Engineer, inventor
- Employer: American Offshore Wind Academy

Serene Hamsho (Arabic: سيرين حمشو), also transliterated Sirin Hamsho, born in Hama, Syria 1986, is a Syrian engineer and inventor specializing in renewable energy. She is known for her work in the wind energy field and was recognized by the BBC's 100 Women and featured in the finale of the programme's international edit-a-thon in 2016. Hamsho is also a TV presenter and media personality. She hosted her own show on Iqraa TV in 2010, and gained public attention in 2015 with her short film "Immigration". and most recently "The First message".

== Education and work ==
Hamsho received a bachelor's degree in electronic engineering from the University of Kalamoon, Syria in 2008, and an MSc degree in management of renewable energy from the University of Versailles, France. She received her professional education in 2017 at the Massachusetts Institute of Technology. In 2012, Hamsho joined General Electric in Schenectady, New York, where she currently holds the title of Wind Turbine Electrical Design Engineer.

In addition to her BS in electronic engineering, she holds a BS in Islamic law from Damascus University in Syria. She is also a board member of Al-Andaluse Islamic Studies Center in Syria, a consultant at Center of Women of Faith and Leadership at IGE, Washington D.C., and a board member of New York Interfaith for Power and Light.

== Patents and awards ==
In 2016, Hamsho invented a design that protects the electrical components inside a wind turbine. In an interview with HuffPost Arabi, she said, "we noticed the damage affecting those elements as a result of the ongoing turbine movement, which pushed me to think of a way to preserve it. However, while the design was implemented, the patent status was abandoned due to expiration of technology " Hamsho is considered to be an inspiring Arab woman as her patent came out during the critical time of the Syrian Civil War and the Arab Spring in the Middle East

Hamsho received the IEEE Women in Engineering award for "Women in Leadership" in 2018. In 2018 she was recognized by the Arabs Americans Association of Engineers and Architects with the honorary award of the year.

== Personal life ==
Hamsho is married to Omar Al Assad, a French scientist and MIT-educated engineer; they have two daughters, and live in Schenectady, New York.

Hamsho holds dual French/Syrian citizenship. In January and February 2017, she was caught up in Executive Order 13769, Donald Trump's restriction of travel to the United States from several other countries. When the order was signed on January 27, she was in Qatar with her children and was unable to return to the United States until February 26.
