= Al Mouwasat University Hospital =

Geography
- Location: Damascus, Syria
- Coordinates: 33.512296°N 36.263329°E

Organisation
- Type: Teaching hospital
- Affiliated university: Damascus University

Services
- Beds: 820

History
- Founded: 1958

Links
- Website: almouwasat.sy
- Lists: Hospitals in Syria

Al-Mouwasat University Hospital (Arabic: مستشفى المواساة الجامعي, romanized: Mustašfā al-Mawāsāt al-Jāmiʿī) was founded on 1958 in Damascus, Syria. It is mainly composed of four buildings: Administration Building, Emergency and Out-Patient Clinics Building and the Physician Residence Building, alongside those building there is the Cardiovascular Surgery Building. The hospital's working team consists of 1,700 Doctors and 3,500 Nurses.

In the scientific research of faculty of medicine at Damascus University including Al-Mouwasat University Hospital, there are improving of the oncology research. The cancer and oncology research at faculty of medicine increases during Syrian crisis.

== Description ==
The hospital contains 820 beds distributed into the following medical sections and devices:

Specialized and general surgery section:

- General Surgery
- Orthopedic Surgery
- Neurosurgery
- Vascular Surgery
- Thoracic Surgery
- Urosurgery
- Burns and Plastic Surgery

Specialized and general internal medicine section:

- Gastro Intestinal
- Thoracic
- Cardiology
- Arthritis
- Infectious Diseases
- Neurology
- Endocrinology
- Kidney
- Hematology
- Psychology
- Physiotherapy

Radiology / X-ray section:

- CT Scan Unit
- X-ray Unit
- MRI Unit
- Mamo-graph Unit
- Echo Unit
- Emergency X-ray Unit

Otic section:

- Ear Diseases and Cranial Base Surgery Unit
- Nose and Sinus Diseases Surgery (including endoscopic)
- Throat, Face, and Neck Diseases Surgery (including tumors)

Ophthalmology:

- Glaucoma Unit
- Retina and Vitreous Unit
- Orbital Cavity
- Cataract Clinic

Laboratories

Intensive care unit

Specialized outpatient clinics

Central emergency

== See also ==
- Faculty of Medicine of Damascus University
