= Children's University Hospital - Damascus =

Children's University Hospital (General Authority for Pediatric Hospital)
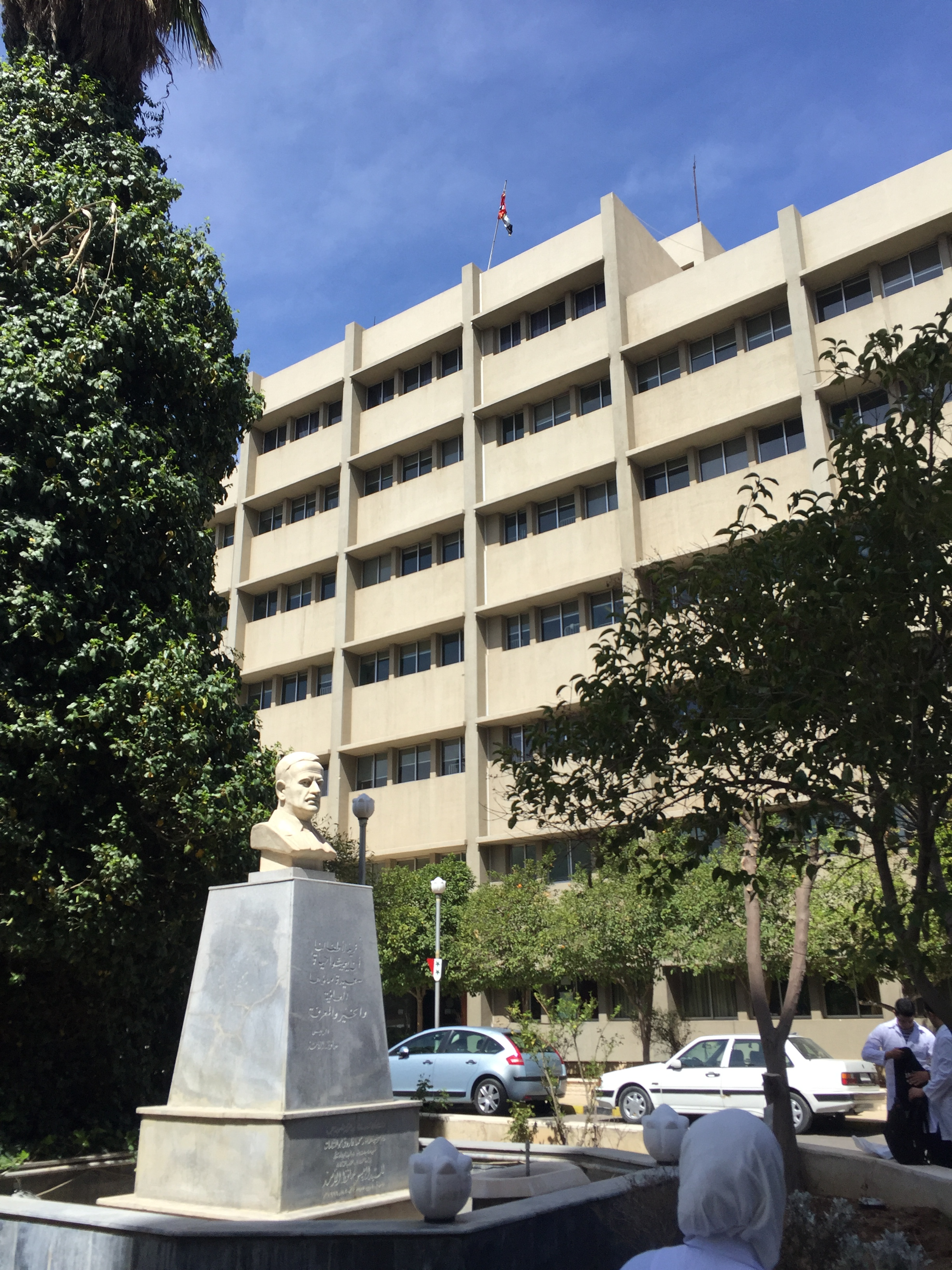

Geography
- Location: Damascus, Syria
- Coordinates: 33.513673°N 36.262207°E

Organisation
- Care system: Public
- Type: Teaching
- Affiliated university: Damascus University

Services
- Beds: 429
- Speciality: Pediatrics

History
- Founded: 1978

Links
- Website: children-hospital.edu.sy
- Lists: Hospitals in Syria

The General Authority for Children's Hospital (Arabic: مستشفى الأطفال الجامعي, romanized: Mustashfa al-aṭfāl al-jāmiʿī) is a pediatric hospital in Damascus, Syria. It is public hospital under the Syrian Ministry of Higher Education and affiliated with the Faculty of Medicine at Damascus University.

== History ==
The General Authority of Pediatrics Hospital was established in the year 1978 in Damascus.

It is considered a service educational body where medical students, postgraduates, and the Arab board receive training, and also doctoral dissertations are prepared in various specialties in addition to students of medical institutes and the nursing school of Damascus University.

It is considered, as well, a scientific center where many conferences are held annually, such as the pediatric hospitals conference, the association of pediatricians conference, the association of the doctors of premature and newborn conference, the Syrian – Italian conference for pediatricians, the Syrian-German conference for pediatricians, the Syrian – Spanish conference for pediatricians, the Syrian-French conference for pediatricians, the Syrian-American conference for pediatricians, and some special conferences on pediatric surgery.

== Sections ==
The hospital has the following departments:

- Emergency and Temporary Accommodation.
- Premature and Newborn.
- Surgery.
- General Diseases.
- Infectious Diseases and Quarantine.
- Oncology and Hematology.
- Private Ward.
- Intensive Care.

== Diagnostic Tools ==
The hospital uses the following diagnostic tools:

- Upper and lower gastrointestinal endoscopy unit and liver biopsies.
- Lung function and bronchial endoscopy unit.
- ECG and echo unit.
- EEG unit.
- MRI.
- A cardiac catheterization.

In addition, the following devices are at use in the Center of Pediatric Cardiac Surgery and Bone Marrow Transplant:

- Integral laboratory device
- Anesthesia, recovery, and I C devices.
- Imaging and X-ray device.
- Integral operation devices.

== Laboratories ==
The hospital has the following laboratories:

- The central laboratory carries out the following medical tests: blood, glands, cancerous, and chemical tests.
- Emergency Lab.
- Histopathology Lab.
- Genetics Lab.
- Artificial Kidney Unit.
- Kidney Transplant Unit.

== See also ==
- Faculty of Medicine of Damascus University
