= Shadia Habbal =

Syrian-American astronomer and space physicist

- Born: Homs, Syria
- Education: University of Cincinnati
- Scientific career
- Fields: Aerospace

Shadia Rifa'i Habbal (Arabic: شادية رفاعي حبال) is a Syrian-American astronomer and physicist specialized in Space physics. A professor of Solar physics, her research is centered on Solar wind and Solar eclipse.

== Life and education ==
She was born as Shadia Na'im Rifa'i in the city of Homs where she finished secondary education, she enrolled in the University of Damascus where she received her bachelor in physics and math. She received a master in physics from the American University of Beirut before receiving her PhD from the University of Cincinnati.

== Career ==
She completed a one-year ASP term at the National Center for Atmospheric Research (1977–1978) and joined the Center for Astrophysics | Harvard & Smithsonian in 1978 where she established a research group in solar-terrestrial physics, a position she kept until 2000. Habbal was also appointed as a professor of solar terrestrial physics at the Institute of Mathematical and Physical Sciences at the University of Wales, Aberystwyth. Between (1995–2000) she was a lecturer at Harvard University.

In 2002 she was appointed editor in the Journal of Geophysical Research, Space Physics Section. Prof Habbal is a member of many professional bodies including the American Astronomical Society, the International Astronomical Union, the Hawaii Institute for Astronomy as well as being a fellow of the Royal Astronomical Society.

== Research ==
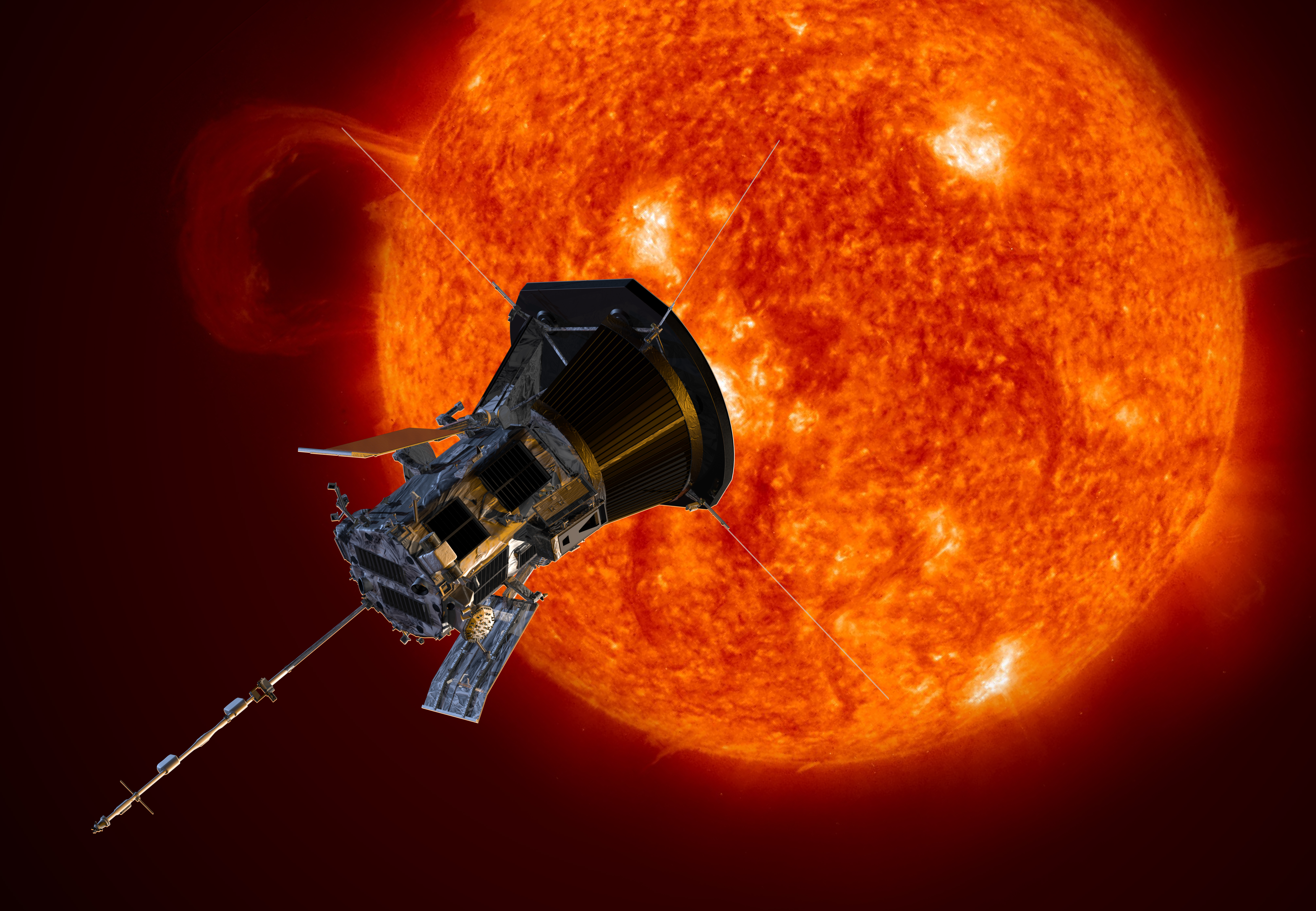
Parker Solar Probe

Prof. Habbal focus on the origin and evolution of the solar wind, solar magnetic fields and eclipse polarimetric observations. She led more than a dozen solar eclipse expeditions, visiting places such as India (1995), Guadeloupe (1998), China (2008), French Polynesia (2010), US (2017), Australia (2023), and US (2024) sponsored by the NSF and NASA. Habbal led a team of the Hawaii Institute for Astronomy that took part in the observation of solar corona during eclipse in association with NASA in 2006, 2008 and 2009, she also played a key role in establishing the NASA Parker Solar Probe, which launched in 2018 and was the first spacecraft to fly into the solar corona. Prof. Habbal developed innovative ways to view the eclipse, including an on-board ship stabilization system for the 2021 Antarctica eclipse (funded by NSF) and a kite-based platform first tested during the 2023 Australia eclipse (funded by NASA). She is leading a campaign for the US 2024 eclipse that will include observations on the ground, by kite, and by airplane with the NASA WB-57 research aircraft.

== Honors ==
- Pioneer, Arab Thought Foundation, December 2004.
- Certificate of Guest Professor from the University of Science and Technology of China, Hefei, September 4, 2001.
- NASA Group Achievement Award, Spartan 201 white Light Coronagraph Team, Washington DC, August 14, 2000.
- Adventurous Women Lecture Series Award, Harvard-Smithsonian Center for Astrophysics Women's Program Committee, June 8, 1998.
- Certificate of Appreciation for outstanding service and support - Harvard-Smithsonian Center for Astrophysics, December 19, 1997.
- Certificate of Appreciation for outstanding service -National Research Council, Board on Atmospheric Sciences and Climate, 1996.
- Certificate of Award in recognition of special achievement reflecting a high standard of accomplishment, Smithsonian Institution, July 25, 1993.

== Selected publications ==
- Zdeněk Hrazdíra; Miloslav Druckmüller; Shadia Habbal (23 December 2020). "Measuring Solar Differential Rotation with an Iterative Phase Correlation Method". The Astrophysical Journal Supplement Series. 252 (1): 6. Bibcode:2021ApJS..252....6H. doi:10.3847/1538-4365/abc702. ISSN 0067-0049. Wikidata Q106192162.
- Benjamin Boe; Shadia Habbal; Miloslav Druckmüller (3 June 2020). "Coronal Magnetic Field Topology from Total Solar Eclipse Observations". The Astrophysical Journal. 895 (2): 123. arXiv:2004.08970. Bibcode:2020ApJ...895..123B. doi:10.3847/1538-4357/ab8ae6. ISSN 0004-637X. Wikidata Q106192173.
- Zdenek Hrazdíra; Miloslav Druckmüller; Shadia Habbal (20 February 2020). "Iterative Phase Correlation Algorithm for High-precision Subpixel Image Registration". The Astrophysical Journal Supplement Series. 247 (1): 8. Bibcode:2020ApJS..247....8H. doi:10.3847/1538-4365/ab63d7. ISSN 0067-0049. Wikidata Q106192174.
- Benjamin Boe; Shadia Habbal; Miloslav Druckmüller; Adalbert Ding; Jana Hodérova; Pavel Štarha (14 January 2020). "CME-induced Thermodynamic Changes in the Corona as Inferred from Fe xi and Fe xiv Emission Observations during the 2017 August 21 Total Solar Eclipse". The Astrophysical Journal. 888 (2): 100. arXiv:1911.11222. Bibcode:2020ApJ...888..100B. doi:10.3847/1538-4357/ab5e34. ISSN 0004-637X. Wikidata Q106192175.
- Fred Sigernes; Pål Gunnar Ellingsen; Noora Partamies; et al. (13 January 2017). "Video cascade accumulation of the total solar eclipse on Svalbard 2015". Geoscientific Instrumentation, Methods and Data Systems. 6 (1): 9–14. doi:10.5194/gi-6-9-2017. ISSN 2193-0856. Wikidata Q57893542.
