= National University Hospital (Damascus) =

- Syrian Ministry of Higher Education

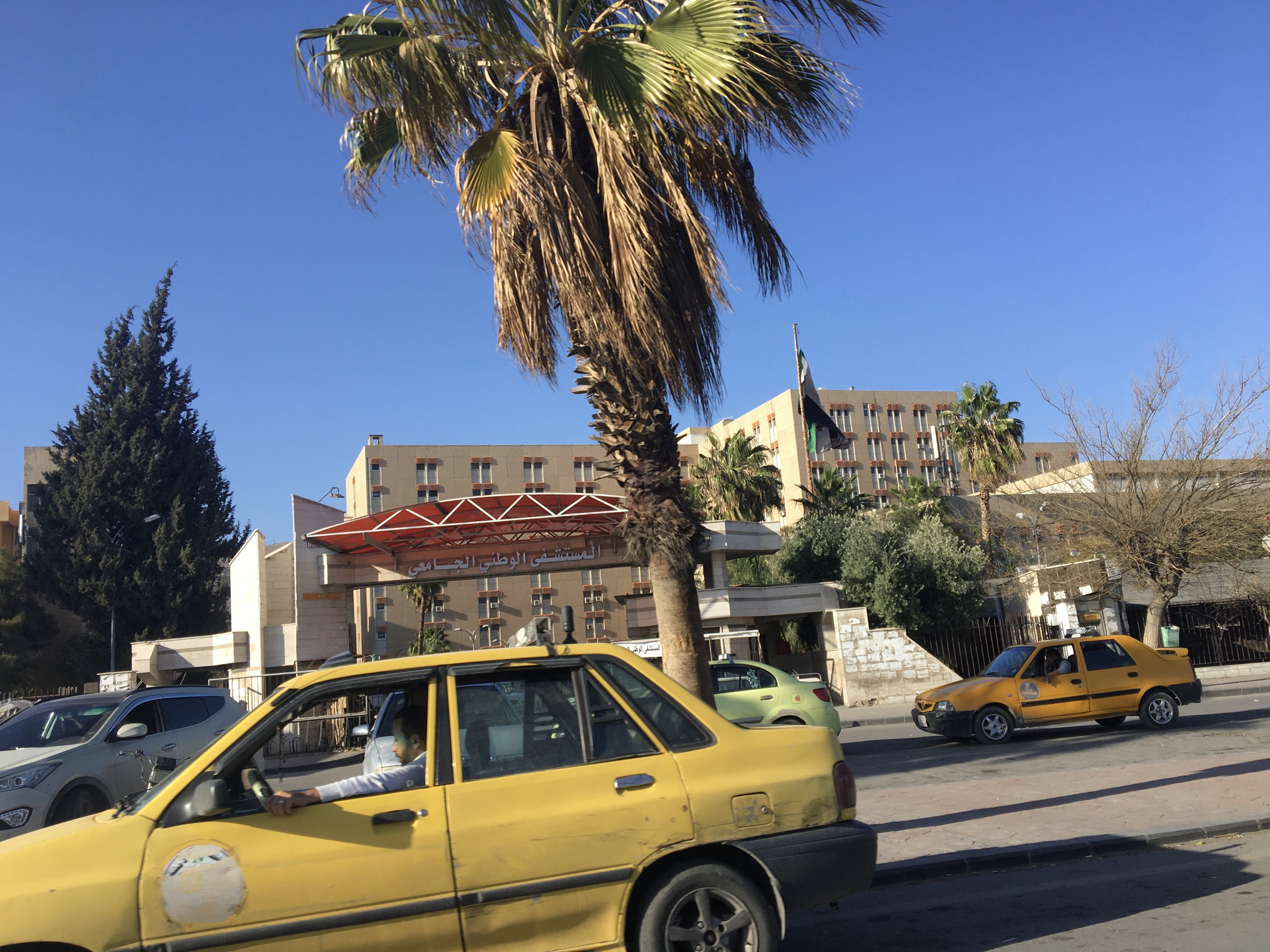
- The University Hospital in 2025

Geography
- Location: 17th April Street, Damascus, Damascus Governorate, Syria
- Coordinates: 33.505716°N 36.269635°E

Organisation
- Type: Teaching
- Affiliated university: Damascus University

Services
- Beds: 645
- Speciality: Multispecialty

History
- Founded: 1988

Links
- Website: www.nuhd.edu.sy
- Lists: Hospitals in Syria

National University Hospital (Arabic: المستشفى الوطني الجامعي) in Damascus is one of the largest teaching hospitals in Syria. It was founded in 1988 and is run by the Ministry of Higher Education. The hospital is affiliated with Damascus University.

Following the Fall of Assad regime in December 2024. The hospital's name was changed from al-Assad University Hospital to National University Hospital. The current director of the National University Hospital is Dr. Abdel Ghani Al-Shalabi, who assumed the position on December 24, 2024. Dr. Al-Shalabi is a specialist in general and laparoscopic surgery, having trained in France, and serves as a professor of general and laparoscopic surgery at the Faculty of Medicine of the Damascus University.

== Facilities ==
The hospital has facilities for MRI and CT scan, a gamma camera and lithotripsy device. The operations ward contains 11 operation rooms suitable for laparoscopic and open heart surgery as well as computerized neurosurgery. Analyses performed by the hospital lab include hormonal, immune, tumor, pharmaceutical, and lymphatic tests/ It has a stem cell bank. The hospital provides medical, therapeutic and surgical services to patients. It is used to train students and graduate doctors from Syrian universities and contributes to scientific research. Hospital activities include internal specialties, including cardiac, neurological, gastrointestinal and kidney. It also performs general, endoscopic, vascular and cardiac surgery, neurosurgery and urosurgery. It has a kidney transplant unit and a physiotherapy unit.

The hospital contains 645 beds, 36 of which are for intensive care, and has a special emergency ward for internal diseases. The faculty of medicine at Damascus and the National University Hospital carry out research into oncology, which increased during the Syrian crisis.

Following the fall of the Assad regime, the Ministry of Health renamed Al-Assad University Hospital to National University Hospital on 24 December 2024.

== See also ==
- Faculty of Medicine of Damascus University
