= Photinos Panas =

French ophthalmologist (1832–1903)

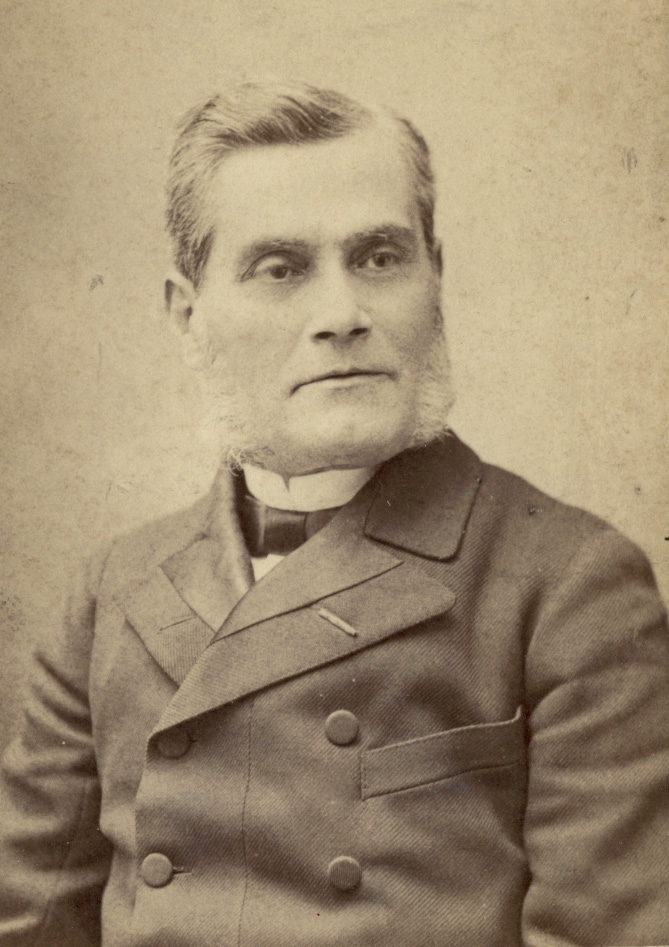
Photinos Panas

Photinos Panas (30 January 1832 – 5 January 1903) was an ophthalmologist born on the Greek island of Cefalonia, then part of the United States of the Ionian Islands.

In 1860 he obtained his medical degree at Paris, where he would later spend his entire medical career. He was the first professor of ophthalmology at the University of Paris, and in 1879 established the ophthalmology clinic at the Hôtel-Dieu de Paris. In 1881 with Edmund Landolt (1846-1926) and Antonin Poncet (1849-1913), he founded the Archives d'ophtalmologie.

In 1894 he published Traité des maladies des yeux, which at the time was considered to be the best French textbook on eye diseases. Panas is credited with introducing an operation for entropion in trichiasis, as well as an operation for attachment of the upper eyelid to the occipitofrontalis muscle for treatment of blepharoptosis. Each of these techniques are sometimes referred to as "Panas' operation" in medical literature.

== Written works ==
- Leçons d'orthopédie, co-écrit with Jean Casimir Felix Guyon (1831-1920) and Joseph-François Malgaigne (1806-1865), Paris, 1862 (Lessons of Orthopedics)
- Leçons sur le strabisme, les paralysies oculaires, le nystagmus, le blépharospasme, etc.; éditions Adrien Delahaye, Paris, 1873 (Lessons of strabismus, ocular palsy, nystagmus, blepharospasm, etc.)
- Leçons sur les maladies inflammatoires des membranes internes de l’œil comprenant l’iritis, les choroïdites et le glaucome, rédigées et publiées with Edouard Francis Kirmisson (1848-1927). in the editions- Adrien Delahaye and Coopagnie, Paris, 1878. (Lessons on inflammatory diseases of the internal membranes of the eye including iritis, choroiditis, and glaucoma.
- Traité des maladies des yeux, 1894 (Treatise on eye diseases).
- Recherches anatomiques et cliniques sur le glaucome et les néoplasmes intraoculaires, co-written with André Rochon-Duvigneaud (1863-1952), Paris, 1898 (Anatomical and clinical research on glaucoma and intraocular neoplasms).
- Le Professeur Panas, (1903) Necrology of Photinos Panas, written by ophthalmologist Félix de Lapersonne (1853-1937).
