= Félix de Lapersonne =

French ophthalmologist

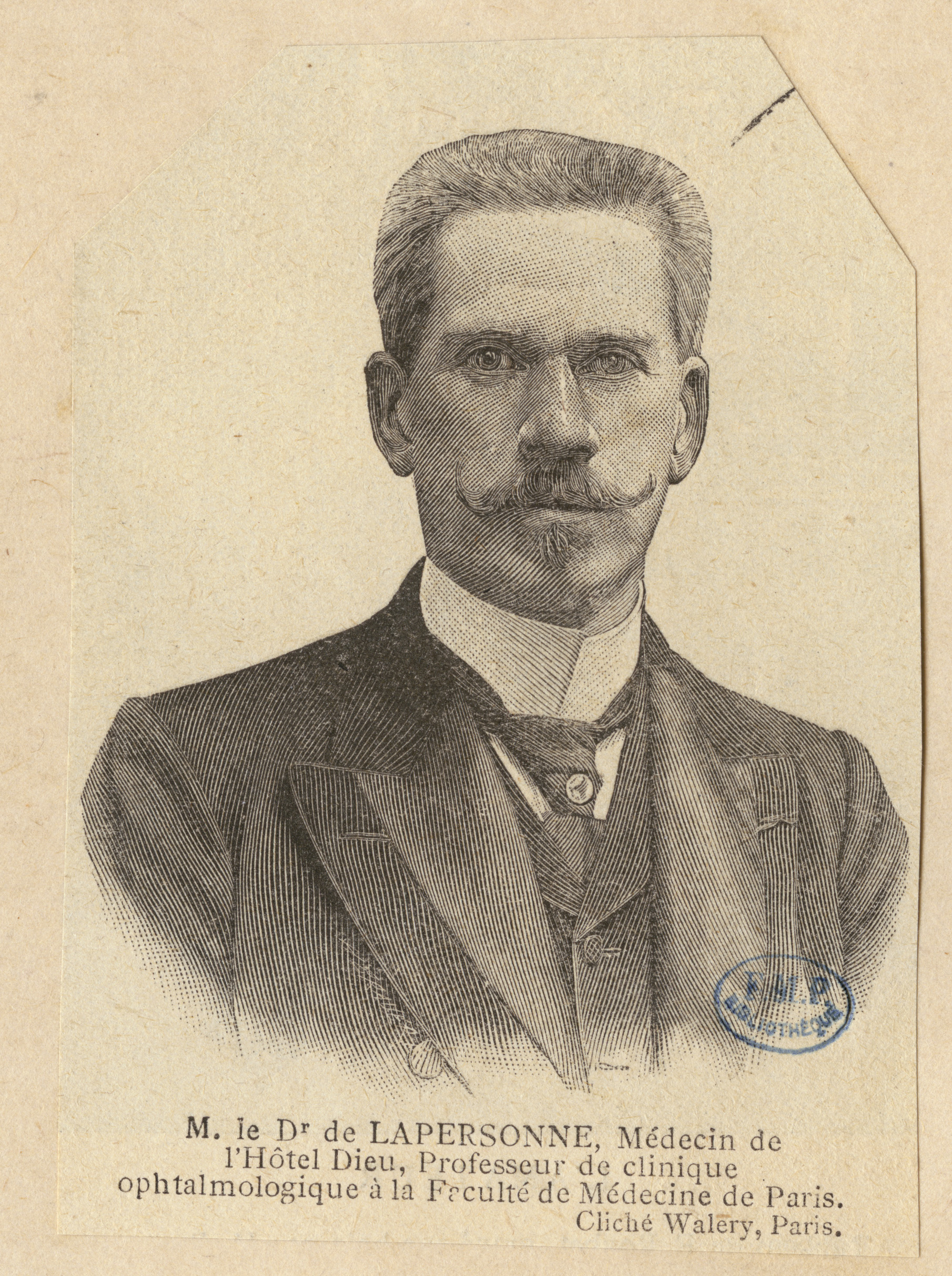
Félix de Lapersonne

Félix de Lapersonne (29 September 1853, Toulouse – 4 July 1937) was a French ophthalmologist.

Born in Toulouse, he served as interne and chef de clinique (i.e. residency) under Photinos Panas (1832–1903) in the ophthalmology clinic at the Hôtel-Dieu de Paris. In 1890 he was appointed professor of ophthalmology to the faculty at Lille, serving as dean until 1901. Afterwards, he returned to Paris, where he worked as professor of clinical ophthalmology. He was a member of the Académie de Médecine, and a chevalier of the Légion d'honneur.

As an ophthalmologist, Lapersonne made contributions in his investigations of syphilitic optic neuritis, and ophthalmoneuromyelitis (Devic's disease). "De Lapersonne's capsulo-iridotome", a punch forceps used in eye surgery, is named after him.

== Written works ==
- Étude clinique sur la maturation artificielle de la cataracte, 1883 - Clinical study on the artificial maturation of cataract.
- Ophtalmologie : maladies des paupières et des membranes externes de l'oeil, 1893 - Ophthalmology : diseases of the eyelids and outer membranes of the eye.
- Leçon d'ouverture du cours de clinique ophtalmologique de la Faculté de médecine de Paris. Hôtel Dieu, 1901
- Le Professeur Panas, 1903 - necrology of Photinos Panas.
- Abrègè d'ophtalmologie, 1922 - Summary of ophthalmology, (with Albert Monbrun 1885-1970).
- Manuel de neurologie oculaire (with Andrè Cantonnet), 1910, second edition/revision in 1923 - Manual of ocular neurology.
