= Damascus University =

Public university in Damascus, Syria

Coordinates: 33°30′41″N 36°17′29″E

- جامعة دمشق
- Logo of Damascus University
- Latin: Universitas Damascena
- Former name: Syrian University (1923–1958)
- Motto: وَقُل رَّبِّ زِدْنِي عِلْمًا
- Motto in English: And say: My Lord, increase me in knowledge (Quran, 20:114)
- Type: Public
- Established: 1923 (Medical School in 1903)
- Academic affiliations: UNAI; UNIMED
- President: Dr. Mustafa Saem Aldaher
- Administrative staff: 2,697
- Students: 182,503
- Undergraduates: 169,067
- Postgraduates: 13,436
- Doctoral students: 1,211
- Other students: 9,289 international students
- Location: Damascus, Syria
- Campus: Urban
- Website: damascusuniversity.edu.sy

Damascus University (Arabic: جامعة دمشق, romanized: Jāmiʾa Dimashq) is a public research university in Damascus, the capital city of Syria. It is the largest and oldest university in the country. It also operates satellite campuses in other Syrian cities.

It was founded in 1923 as the Syrian University (Arabic: الجامعة السورية, romanized: al-Jāmiʾa al-Sūriyya) through the merger of the Medical School (established 1903) and the Institute of Law (established 1913). It adopted its current name after the founding of the University of Aleppo in 1958.

Damascus University was one of the most reputable universities in the Arab World before the Syrian civil war started in 2011.

Damascus University consists of several faculties, higher institutes, intermediate institutes and a school of nursing. One of the institutions specializes in teaching the Arabic language to foreigners, which as of 2005 was the largest institution of its kind in the Arab world.

== History ==
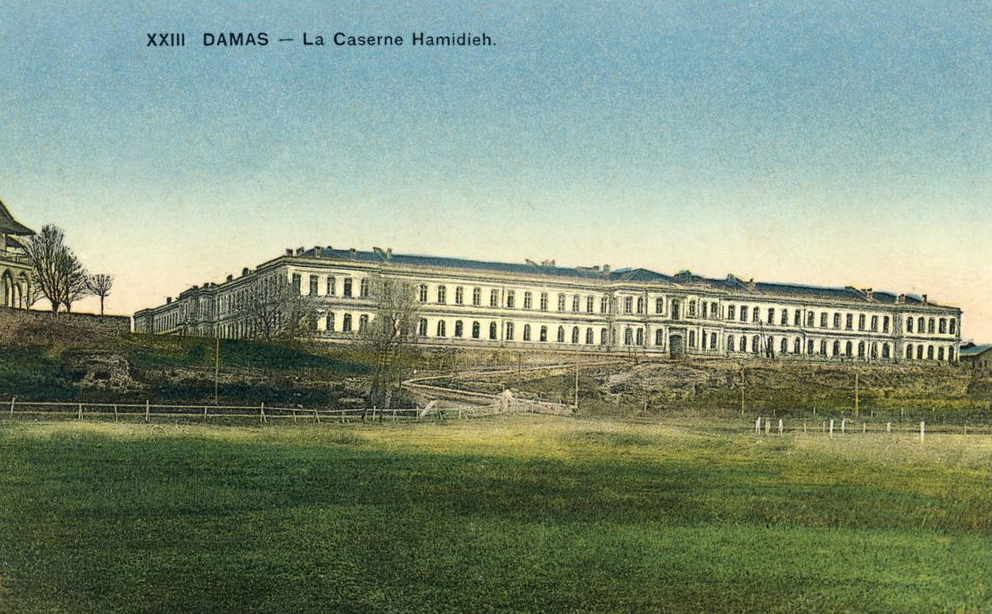
La Caserne Hamidieh, previous headquarter of the Syrian University, is the Faculty of Law building.

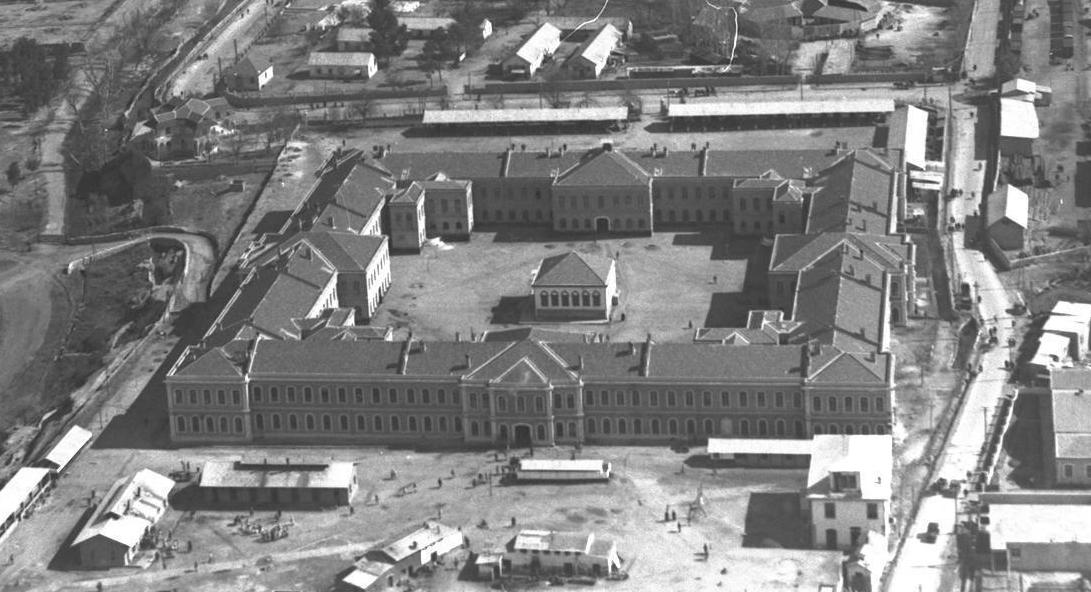
Aerial view of the headquarter in 1933

In 1901, the establishment of the Office of the School of Medicine in Damascus was approved and in 1903 this school, which is the nucleus of the university, opened. The school included branches in medicine and pharmacy, and the language of instruction was Turkish.

In 1913, a Law School opened in Beirut, in which most of the teachers were Arabs and the language of instruction was Arabic. Then this school was transferred to Damascus in 1914 just as the School of Medicine moved to Beirut. Then in the last years of the First World War the Law School returned to Beirut.

Following that the Institute of Medicine and the School of Law opened in Damascus, the former at the beginning of January in 1919 and the latter in September of the same year.

In 1923, the School of Law was named the Institute of Law and this institute was linked together with the Institute of Medicine, the Arab Society, and the Center of Arabic Heritage in organization under the name of the Syrian University. Then the Arab Society and the Center of Arabic Heritage separated from the organization in 1926.

In 1928, the School of Higher Literary Studies was established and it connected its administration with the university. In 1929 it became the School of Letters, which closed in 1935–1936.

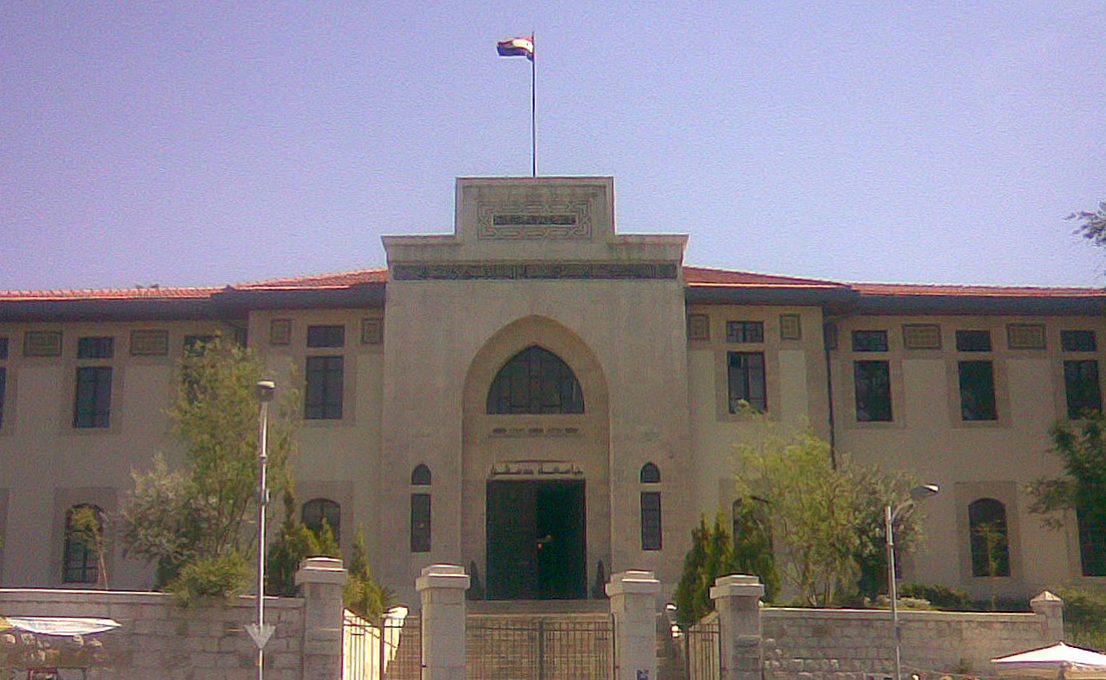
Damascus University headquarter in Baramkeh

Then starting in 1946, the university was no longer limited to the Institutes of Medicine and Law, but rather faculties and higher institutions were created in other subjects.

In 1958, a new law was created to regulate the universities in the northern and southern regions of the United Arab Republic. This led to changing the name of “the Syrian University” to “Damascus University” and to the creation of a second northern university called “the University of Aleppo.”

In 1959, The College of Fine Arts was established in Damascus and became part of Damascus University in 1972.

== Structure ==
=== Degrees programs ===
Damascus University awards graduate (Master, Ph.D. Professional Training and Qualification) and undergraduate (Bachelor) degree programs. The period of study for the bachelor's degree ranges from 4 to 6 years, based on the need for each discipline of study. The Master programs combine course work and research, and require a minimum of two years and a maximum of a three. Under certain circumstances, an additional fourth year may be approved by a decision of the university council based on the recommendation of the faculty council. The Ph.D. degree is a fully research program. The period of research is not less than two years and not more than five years by the decision of the university council based on the recommendation of the faculty council. although some faculties -Like Faculty of Arts, English Literature Department- does not award Ph.D. degree.

=== Faculties ===
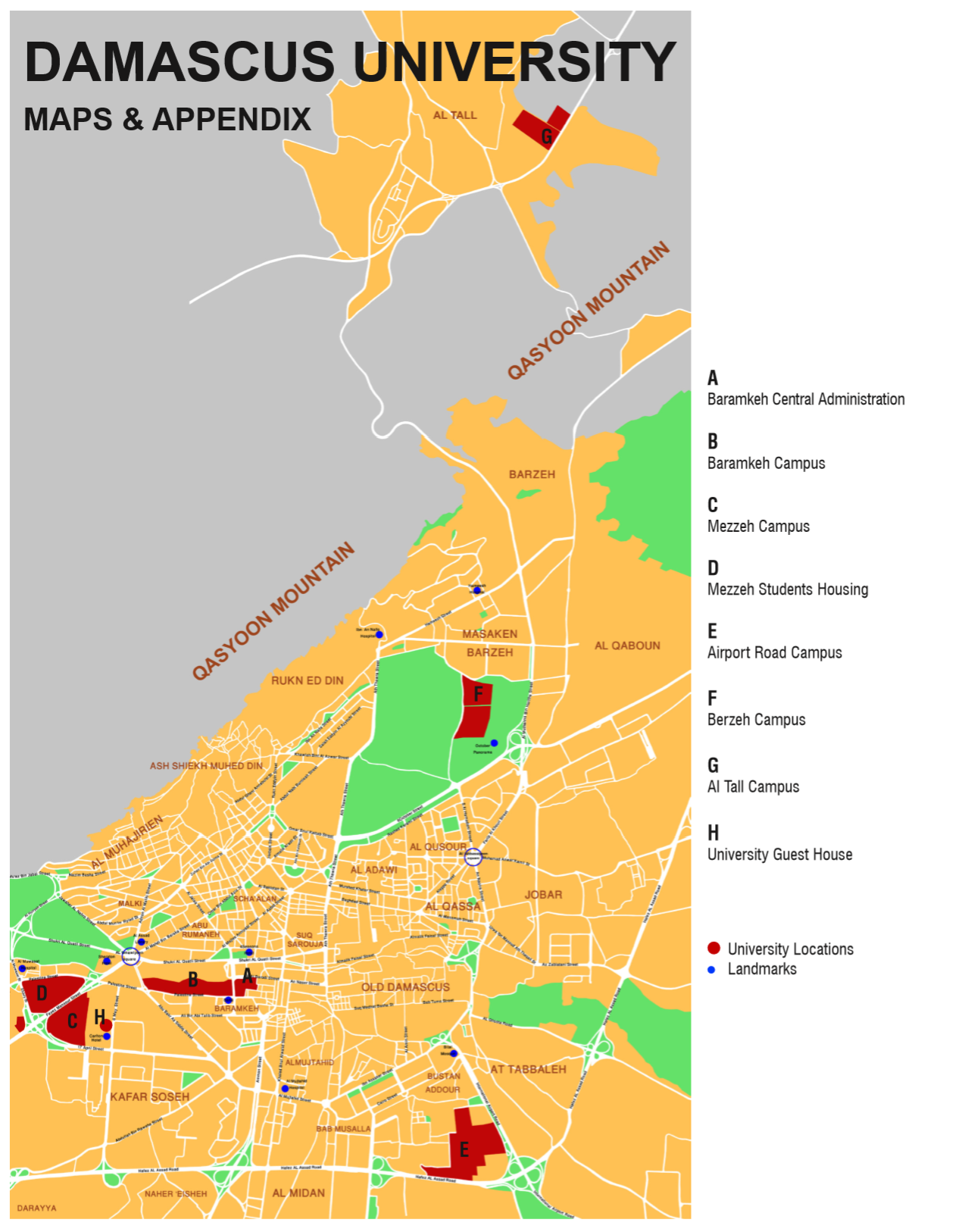
Damascus University map

- Medicine: Founded in 1903. It is one of the top ten international providers of licensed physicians to the United States, the third in the Eastern hemisphere.
- Pharmacy: Founded in 1903.
- Dentistry: Founded in 1921.
- Information Technology: Founded in 1994.
- Civil Engineering: Founded in 1961.
- Mechanical Engineering & Electrical Engineering: Founded in 1963.
- Economics: Founded in 1956.
- Arts and Humanities: Founded in 1928.
- Education: Founded in 1946.
- Agriculture: Founded in 1963.
- Islamic Jurisprudence: Founded in 1954.
- Architecture: Founded in 1960.
- Sciences
- Fine Arts: Founded in 1960.
- Political Science: Founded in 1979.
- Law: Founded in 1913.
- Tourism

=== Higher institutes ===
- Higher Institute of Laser Research and Applications
- Higher Institute of Administrative Development
- Higher Institute of Seismologic Studies and Research
- Higher Institute of Languages
- Higher Institute of Translation and Interpretation

The Arabic Language Institute at the University of Damascus is recognized as the best center to study Arabic for non-native speakers in the world. The Center for Arabic Study abroad, the premier U.S. organization for Arabic study, is now opening a second branch at the university. The Arabic Language Institute at the University of Damascus is known for immersion instruction in Arabic, allowing more rapid, natural and comprehensive language acquisition. The Arabic Language Institute's faculty is committed to classical Arabic instruction, offering an advantage to either Egypt or Jordan where much instruction is conducted in the local dialect.

=== Technical institutes ===
The duration of the study is two years, when the graduate students receive a diploma from the institute itself according to the jurisdiction of their choice.

- Technical Institute of Business Administration and Marketing: with the following disciplines: Business Administration – Marketing – Public Relations.
- Technical Institute of Finance and Banking Sciences: (formerly known as the "Commercial Institute", offers associate degrees in the following disciplines: Accounting – financial markets – banking studies. The best students are offered the opportunity to continue their education at the Faculty of Economics.)
- Technical Institute of Medicine
- Technical Institute of Dentistry
- Technical Institute of Engineering
- Technical Institute of Mechanical Engineering and electricity
- Technical Institute of Computer Science
- Technical Institute of Agricultural studies

On 13 November 2012, the President Bashar al-Assad issued a decree on establishing a branch for Damascus University in Madinat al-Salam, a city in Quneitra Governorate.

=== Open Learning ===
The Open Learning Center offers degrees in three majors:

- Legal studies
- Computer and informatics
- Minor and intermediate projects
- English language

=== Library ===
The University of Damascus Library began in 1903 (with the establishment of the Medical Bureau). As of 2011 it contains some 169,000 volumes and 3,830 current periodicals.

=== University hospitals ===
The university runs eight hospitals in the city of Damascus:

- National University Hospital (Damascus)
- Al Mouwasat University Hospital
- Obstetrics & Gynecology University Hospital
- Cardiac Surgery University Hospital
- Dermatology & Venereal Diseases University Hospital
- Children's University Hospital
- Al Bairouni University Hospital
- Oral Maxillofacial Surgery Hospital

=== Career guidance and capabilities building centers ===
- Business Clinics (Shabab-Damascus). Also, the University of Damascus has co-operative agreements with other local university such as International University for Science and Technology in addition to international agreements.

== Ranking ==
In 2023, Damascus University rose in the QS Ranking due to its sustainable development research. In 2024, the university was ranked in the Times Higher Education World University Rankings at the rank +1501, which was the only Syrian university ranked in the THE World University Rankings. Damascus University also increased in the Webometrics ranking.

== Logo ==
The emblem of Damascus University reflects the importance of science and endless desire of human for knowledge, as well as the privacy of Damascus in development of science and scientists.

The lamp is the symbol of knowledge in different cultures, it radiates the light of knowledge and science, crowned with a verse from the Quran: "say oh my Lord, increase me in knowledge", which is the motto of Damascus University and its non-stop seeking.

== Notable alumni ==
- Dina Katabi – Professor in the Department of Electrical Engineering and Computer Science at MIT and the director of the MIT Wireless Center
- Rached Ghannouchi - Tunisian Politician
- Mahmoud Abbas - President of Palestine
- Rasha Abbas – author and journalist
- Khaled al-Asaad – archaeologist and the head of antiquities at the ancient city of Palmyra
- Iman al-Bugha – professor of fiqh who left her university job to join the Islamic State of Iraq and the Levant
- Awad Saud Awad – Palestinian writer and journalist, B.A. in Art History
- Muhammad al-Yaqoubi – Islamic scholar and religious leader
- Ali Saeed Badwan - Palestinian writer and political analyst
- Rashad Barmada – served as deputy prime minister of Syria and minister of defense
- Husam Chadat – actor and director (graduated in civil engineering)
- Giles Clarke – chairman of the England and Wales Cricket Board
- Colette Khoury – novelist
- Muhsina al-Mahithawi, economist and politician, governor of Suwayda Governorate (2024–present)
- Gyorgy Busztin – Hungarian Ambassador and U.N. Deputy Special Representative
- Sa'id al-Afghani – Professor and Dean of the Faculty of Arts
- Abdelsalam al-Majali – former Prime Minister of Jordan
- Riad Ismat – diplomat, writer and theatrical director
- George Percy, Earl Percy – British businessman and heir apparent to the Dukedom of Northumberland
- Nizar Qabbani – poet, author and diplomat, B.A. in Law
- Abbas al-Noury – actor, author, director and TV presenter, B.A. in History
- Duraid Lahham – actor, author, Director and TV presenter, B.Sc. in Chemistry and Physics
- Farouk al-Sharaa – politician and diplomat, Syrian Vice President, B.A. in English Literature
- Aref Dalila – economist and politician, B.Sc. in Economics
- Ali Farzat – caricaturist and painter, B.A. in Fine Arts
- Ibrahim Mughrabi – football striker, studied law before moving to Greece to continue his studies
- Georges Tarabichi – writer
- Elias Farah – Syrian writer and thinker who was a prominent member of the Ba'ath Party in Iraq.
- Riad Barmada – Syrian-American orthopedics surgeon,
- Imran Raza Ansari – Jammu and Kashmir politician, cabinet minister and Shia cleric
- Louay Kayali – artist
- Marwan Kassab-Bachi – German painter of Syrian origin
- Mohammad Rasoul Al–Kilani – Jordanian politician and military officer.
- Abdul Halim Khaddam – Vice President of Syria and "High Commissioner" to Lebanon from 1984 to 2005
- Moustapha Akkad – Syrian American film producer and director
- Nazim al-Qudsi – former President of Syria
- Nureddin al-Atassi – former President of Syria
- Mahmoud Zuabi – Prime Minister of Syria from 1987 to 2000
- Muhammad Mustafa Mero – Prime Minister of Syria from 2000 to 2003
- Bashir al-Azma – Prime Minister of Syria and later a Minister in the United Arab Republic (UAR)
- Faisal Mekdad – Foreign Minister of Syria, late Permanent Representative of Syria to the UN
- Georges Sabra – president of the Syrian National Council
- Haitham al-Maleh – human rights activist and former judge and one of the most important opposition figures in Syria
- Shadia Habbal – Syrian-American astronomer and physicist
- Ghada al-Samman – writer, journalist and novelist
- Omar Alghabra – Member of the Parliament of Canada
- Sadiq Jalal al-Azm – Professor of Modern European Philosophy
- Ghassan Kanafani – Palestinian author and member of the Popular Front for the Liberation of Palestine (PFLP)
- Sirin Hamsho – engineer and inventor
- Khalid Bakdash – leader of the Syrian Communist Party and the "dean of Arab communism"
- Akram al-Hawrani – One of the founders of Ba'ath Party and vice-president of the United Arab Republic
- Omar Bakri Muhammad – Salafi Islamist militant leader
- Kenan Yaghi, Finance Minister of Syria
- Bashar al-Assad - Former disposed President of Syria
- Ibrahim Fahsah - Cardiologist, University of Louisville Healthcare. First in the region to perform “trans-radial” heart catheterization.
- Joumana Seif – human rights activist
- Muhammad 'Awwamah - Hanafi hadith scholar

== Gallery ==
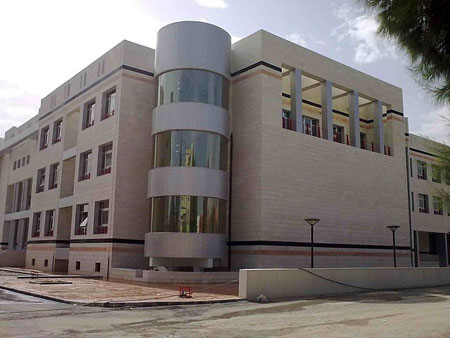
Faculty of IT Engineering

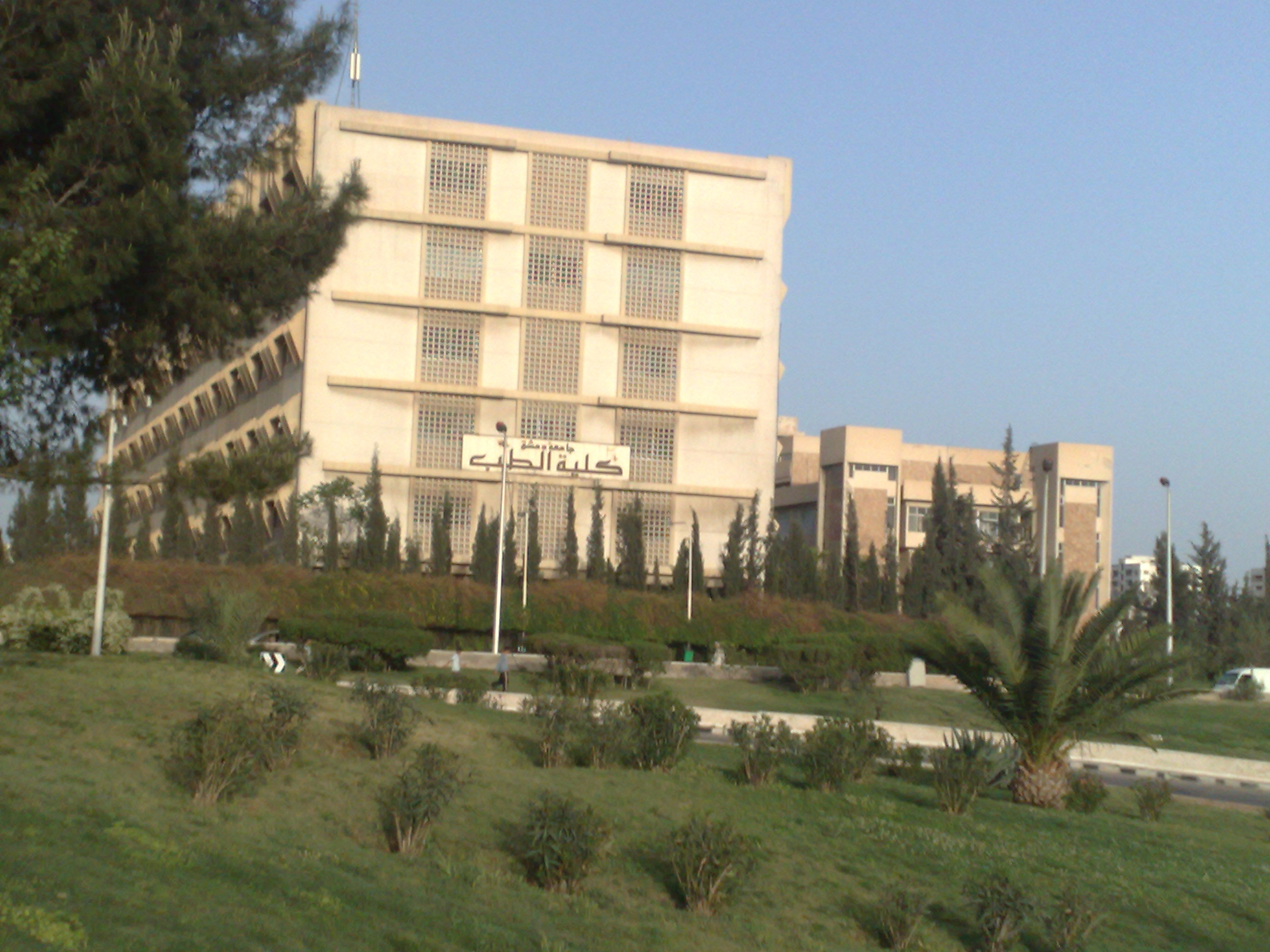
Faculty of Medicine

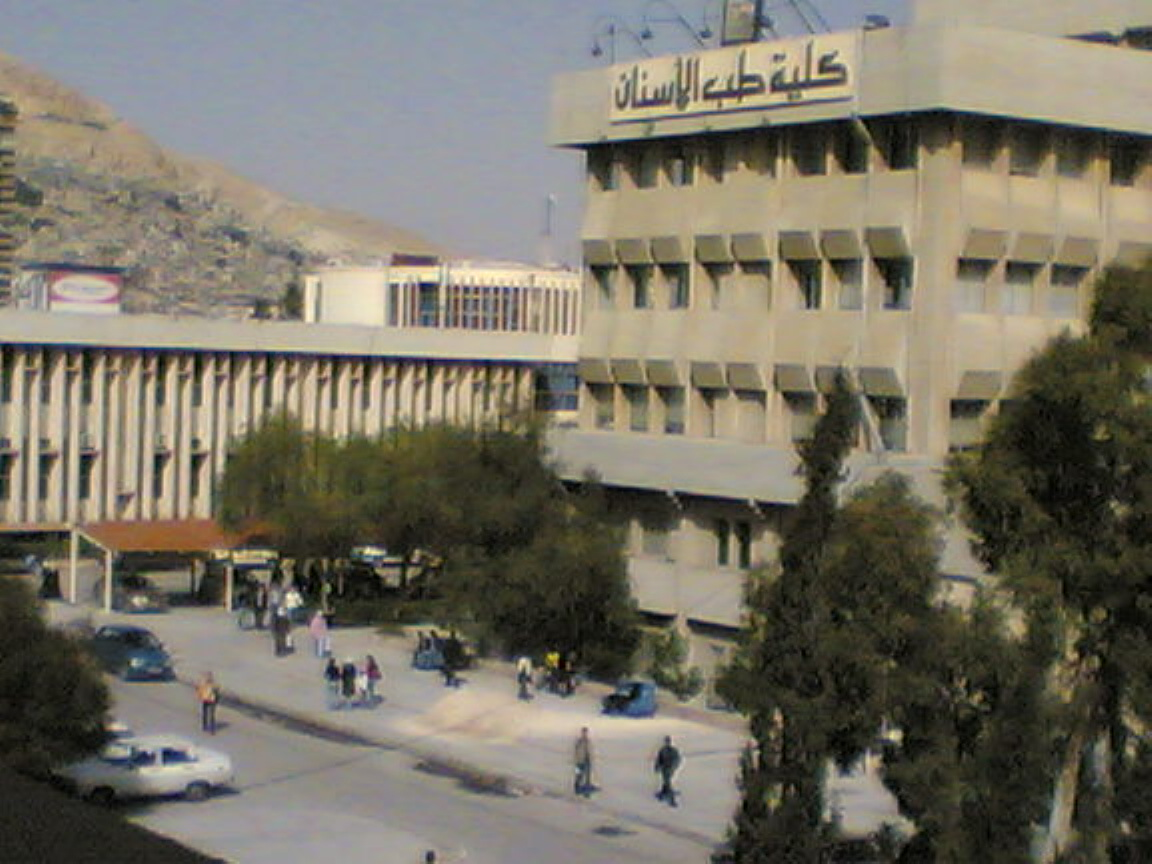
Faculty of Dentistry

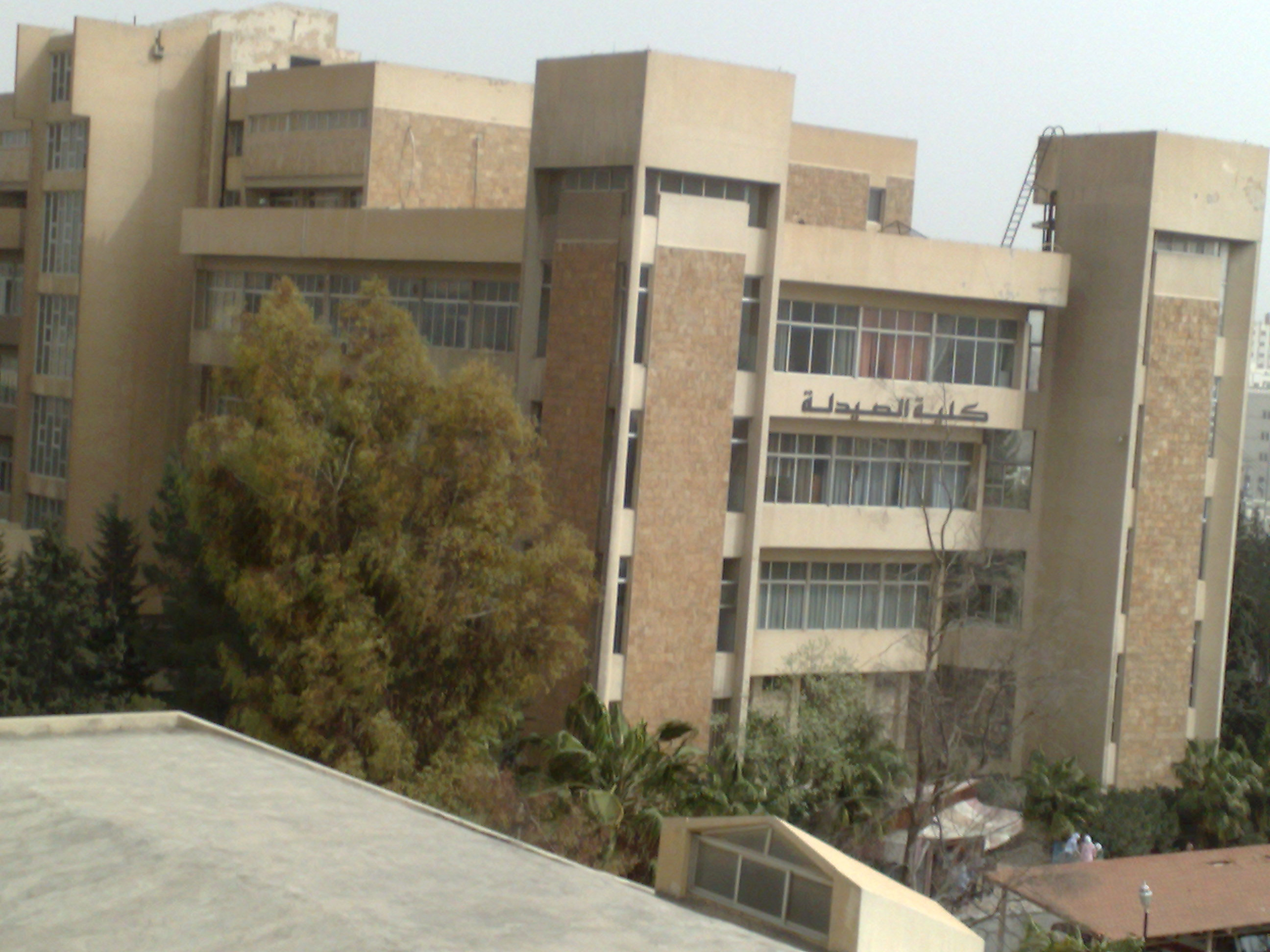
Faculty of Pharmacy

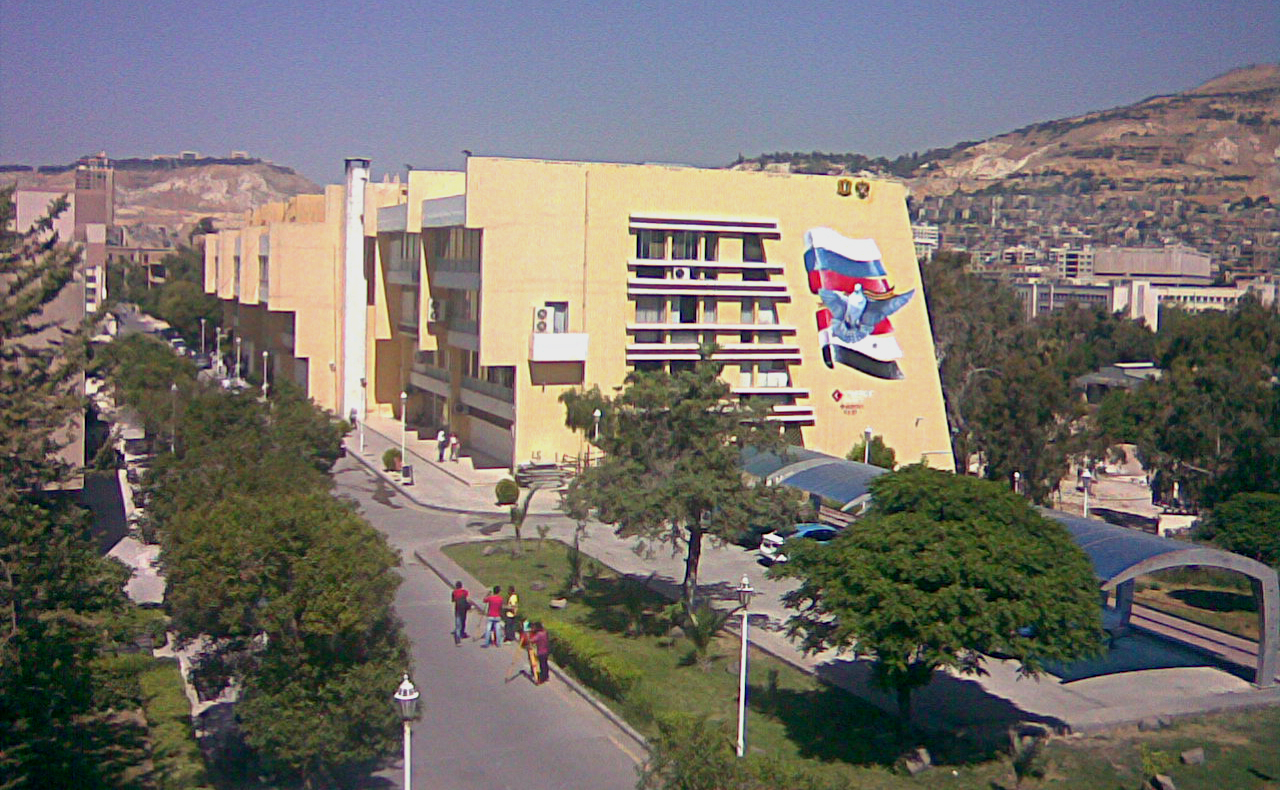
Faculty of Architecture

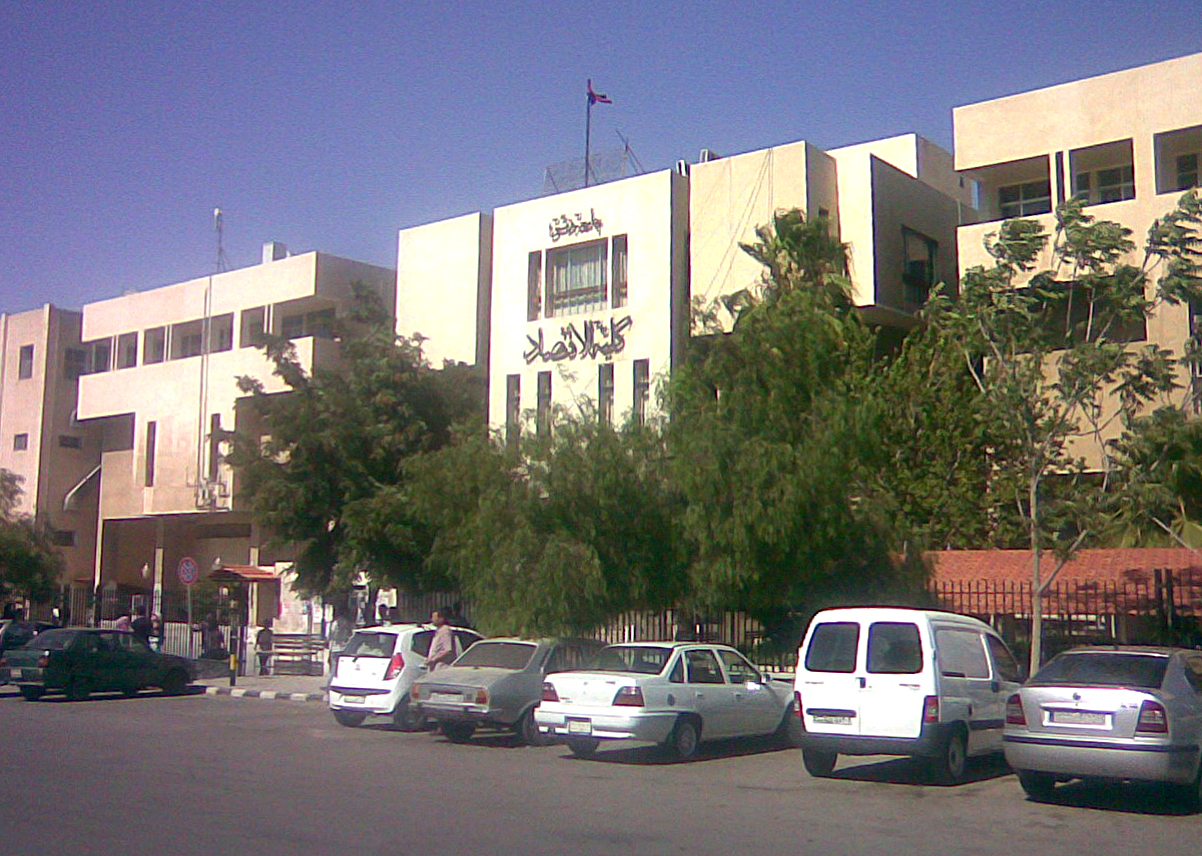
Faculty of Economics

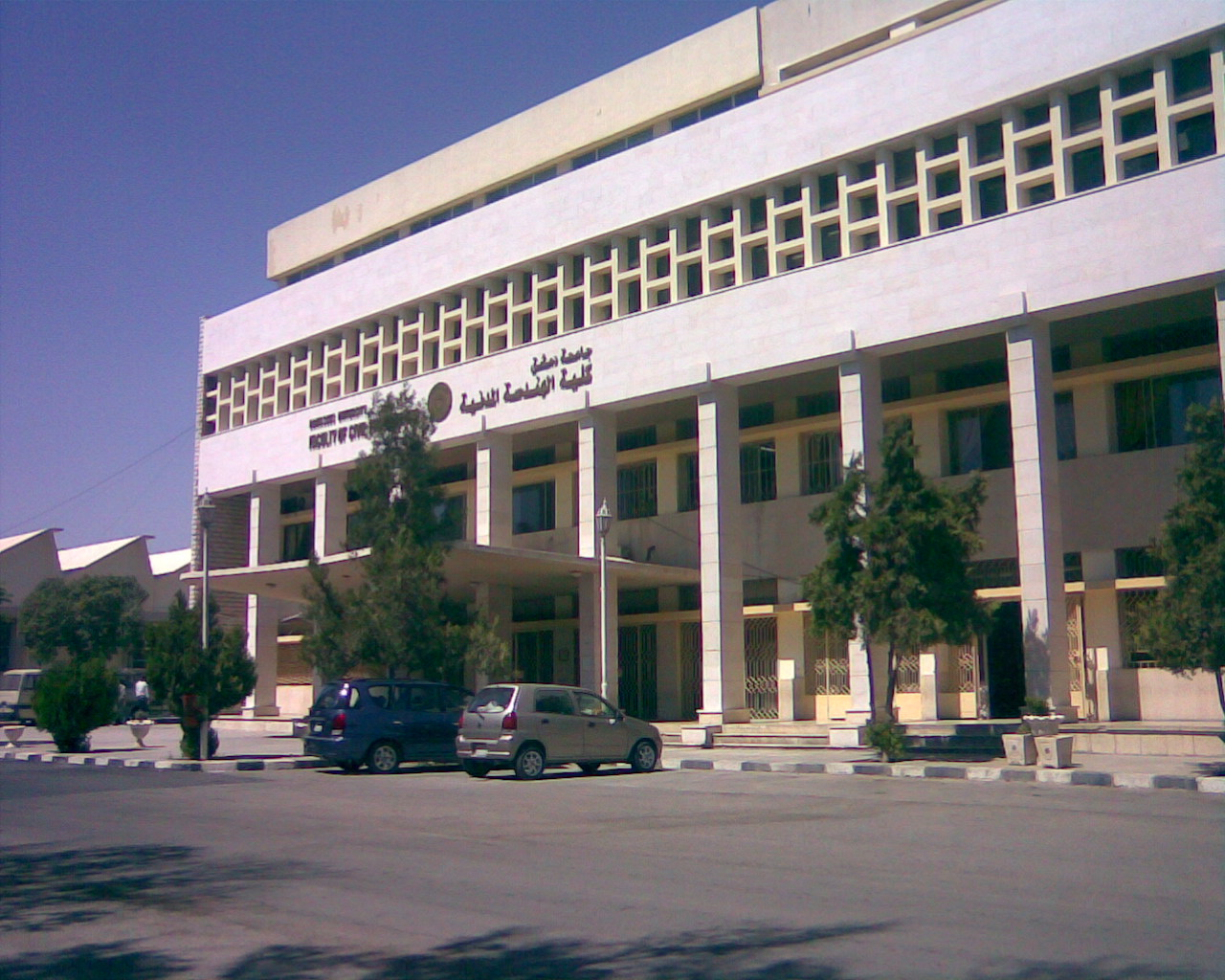
Faculty of Civil Engineering

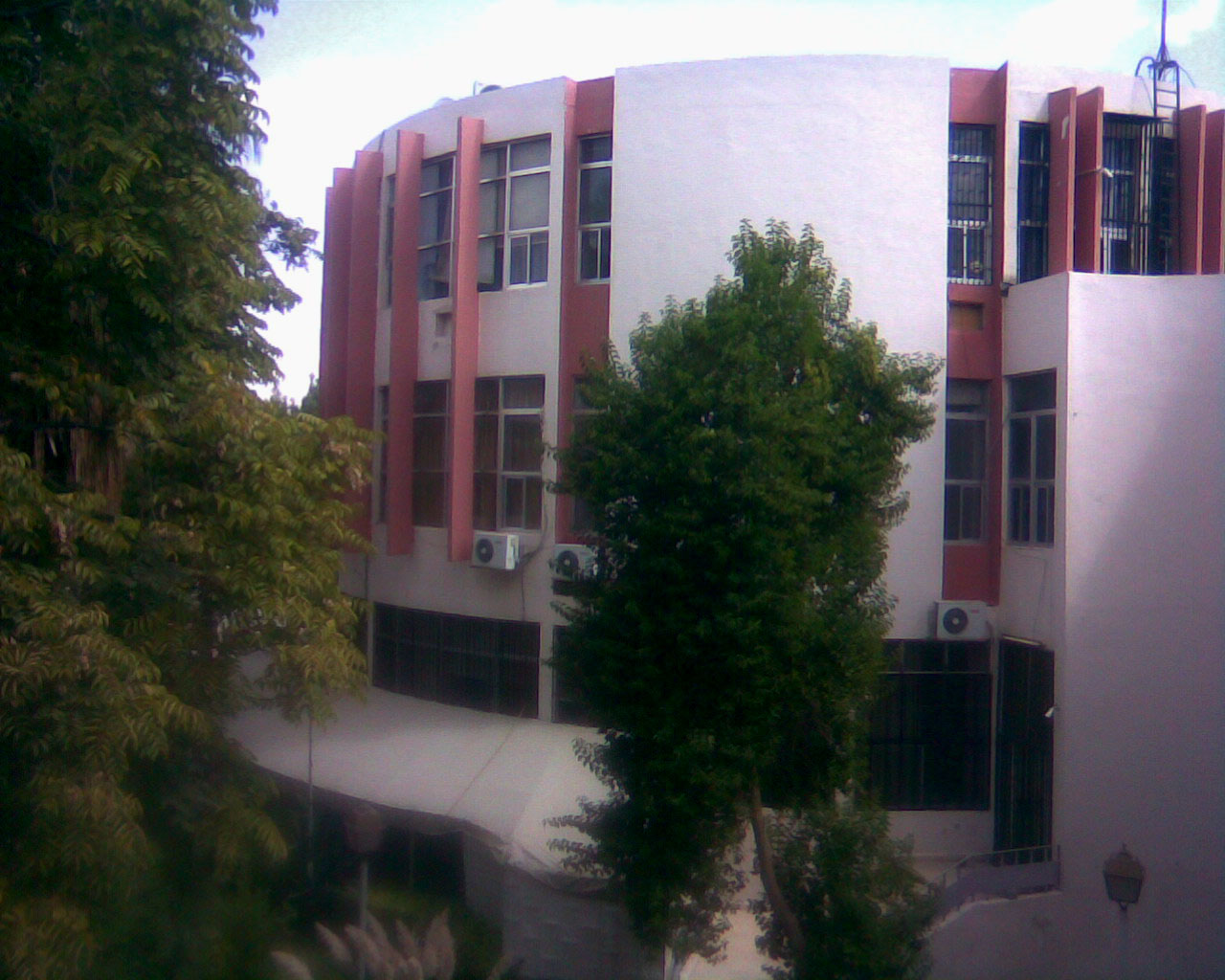
Higher Institute of Languages

== See also ==
- List of Islamic educational institutions
- List of universities in Syria
