= Michael Barmada =

American geneticist

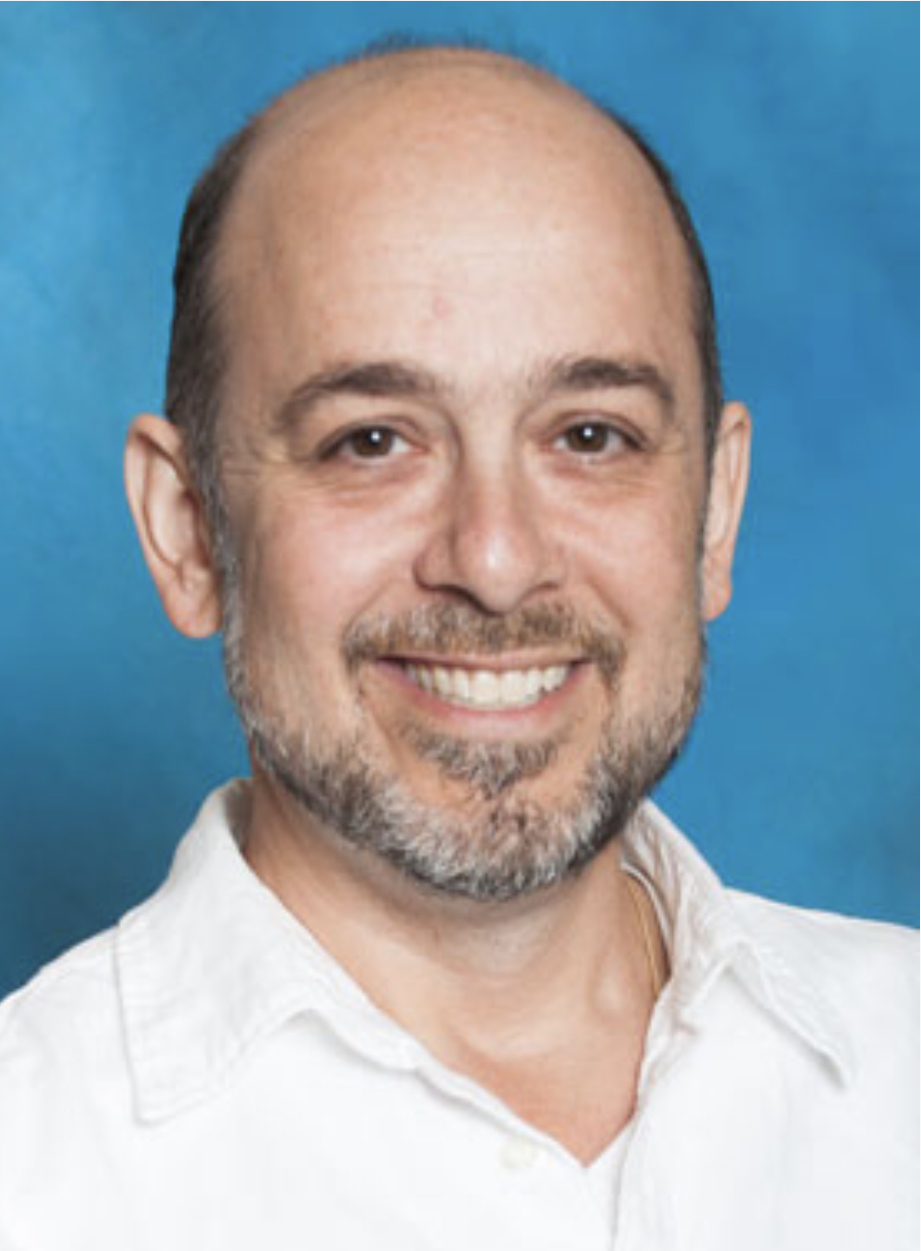
Michael Barmada

Mahmud Barmada, known as Michael Barmada, (1969–2016) was an American geneticist and computational geneticist at the University of Pittsburgh. His research focused on the statistical and computational analysis of human genetic variation and complex traits, including the use of genome-wide association studies and computational methods to identify genetic factors associated with disease

== Career ==
Barmada worked at the Institute for Personalized Medicine as associate director and co-director of the Center for Simulation and Modeling. He held a secondary appointment in the Department of Biomedical Informatics.

In 1991, he graduated from Carnegie Mellon University with a bachelor's degree in chemistry and biological sciences with a minor in piano composition; in 1993, he earned a master's in molecular genetics at Johns Hopkins; and in 1999, he earned a PhD in human genetics with a concentration in statistical and computational genetics at Pitt.

Professor Dan Weeks said, “He did more than his fair share, freely and of his own initiative, to the benefit of the department and the whole school.”

Weeks said Barmada was among the university's first researchers to tackle next-generation sequencing. “He was asked so much for help that he created and taught a workshop on it.”

According to Google Scholar, Barmada has an h-index of 56. According to the Scopus he has an h-index of 48.

== Selected papers ==
- A Genome-Wide Association Study Identifies IL23R as an Inflammatory Bowel Disease Gene
- Genome-wide association defines more than 30 distinct susceptibility loci for Crohn's disease
- Genome-wide association study identifies new susceptibility loci for Crohn disease and implicates autophagy in disease pathogenesis
