= Arts and Humanities in Higher Education =

- Discipline: Education
- Language: English
- Edited by: Tara Winters

Publication details
- History: 2002-present
- Publisher: SAGE Publications
- Frequency: Quarterly

Standard abbreviations
- ISO 4: Arts Humanit. High. Educ.

Indexing
- ISSN: 1474-0222
- LCCN: 2003200618
- OCLC no.: 50409791

Links
- Journal homepage; Online access; Online archive

Arts and Humanities in Higher Education is a quarterly peer-reviewed academic journal that covers the field of education of the arts and humanities. The editor-in-chief is Tara Winters (Auckland University). It was established in 2002 and is currently published by SAGE Publications.

== Abstracting and indexing ==
The journal is abstracted and indexed in the following databases:

- British Humanities Index
- Contents Pages in Education
- MLA International Bibliography
- Scopus
- Zetoc
