= Michael Rizzello =

Michael Gaspard Rizzello OBE (2 April 1926 – 28 September 2004) was a sculptor, medallist, and designer.

== Biography ==
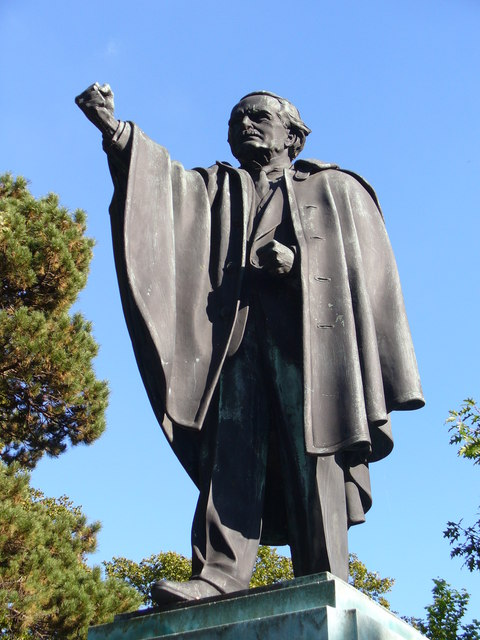
Rizzello's 1960 David Lloyd George in Cathays Park, Cardiff

Rizzello was born in London of Italian parents. His father was a tailor. He attended the London Oratory School and did not want to follow his father's profession. He enlisted in the army in 1944, and was demobbed in 1948. He was a good baritone singer and had to choose between music and drawing; he chose the latter. He attended the Royal College of Art winning both the Drawing Prize and Travelling Scholarship in Sculpture. This led to him studying sculpture in Rome for two years and he was awarded the Prix de Rome 1951 for Sculpture at The British School at Rome. He began his career making wax heads for Madame Tussauds.

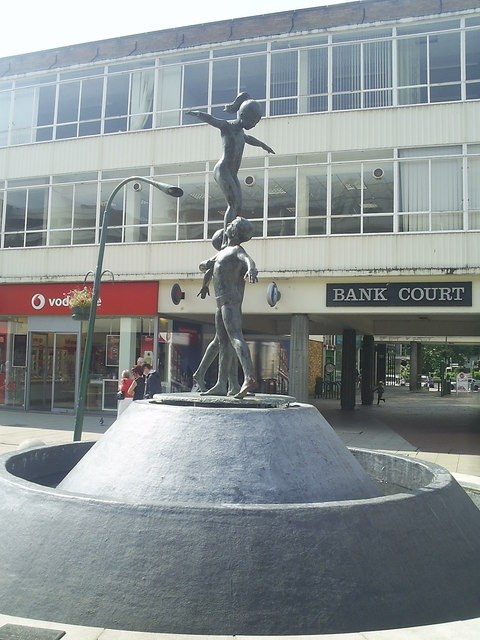
Rizzello's 1993 Waterplay in Hemel Hempstead

Rizzello served an unprecedented term of two five-year periods as President of the Royal Society of British Sculptors. His public statuary includes Dancer with Ribbon in Oxford Street, London (the Plaza, the old Bourne & Hollingsworth). His David Lloyd George stands in Cathays Park, Cardiff, and other portrait busts include Nelson Mandela. His 1996 bronze portrait of Lady Astor is in the Speakers' House of the Palace of Westminster in London.

Rizzello also designed coins and medals, including the Conspicuous Gallantry Cross and the £2 coin commemorating the 50th anniversary of the United Nations, both in 1995.

Rizzello was made an OBE in the 1977 Silver Jubilee and Birthday Honours list. He died in London, England. A posthumous exhibition of his work was shown in the Mall Galleries in April 2005.

He married Sheila Maguire in 1950; she died in 2002. They had one daughter, who survived them.
