= Riad Barmada =

Syrian-American surgeon and professor

- رياض برمدا
- Born: July 26, 1929; Aleppo, Syria
- Died: January 10, 2014 (aged 84); Chicago
- Education: University of Damascus; University of Illinois at Chicago
- Occupations: Orthopedic surgeon, professor
- Organization: University of Illinois at Chicago
- Children: 2

Riad Barmada (Arabic: رياض برمدا; July 26, 1929 – January 10, 2014) was a Syrian-American orthopaedic surgeon and professor. He was the head of orthopedics at the University of Illinois at Chicago from 1984 to 1998 and served as the president of the Illinois Orthopedic Society and president of the Chicago Committee on Trauma.

== Early life and education ==
Barmada was born in 1929 and grew up in Aleppo. His father was a judge in Syria. His uncles were Mustafa Bey Barmada, former Governor-General of the State of Aleppo; and Rashad Barmada, minister of Defense in Syria.

Barmada completed his medical degree from University of Damascus in 1956 and completed a one-year general surgery residency there before going to Chicago.

Baramda completed an internship at Walther Memorial Hospital, followed by residencies in orthopedic surgery at St. Elizabeth Hospital, Illinois Masonic Hospital, and the University of Illinois Hospital.

== Career ==
In the early 1960s, he helped found a medical school at the University of Aleppo where the curriculum was taught in English so that students could learn from the most current medical literature without having to wait for translations.

In 1967, he joined the faculty of University of Illinois at Chicago (UIC) College of Medicine as a research associate. He became a professor of orthopedics in 1972. He headed the department from 1984 to 1998. He retired in 1999 but remained professor emeritus.

He worked quietly to bring women and minorities into orthopaedic surgery, which was a particularly male-dominated specialty in the 70s.

He was a member of numerous associations, including the International Society of Orthopaedic Surgery and Traumatology, American Academy of Orthopaedic Surgeons, American Orthopaedic Association, American Medical Association, and Illinois State Medical Society. Barmada was a fellow of the American College of Surgeons, president of the Chicago Committee on Trauma, and served as president of the Illinois Orthopaedic Society in 1991.

According to Google Scholar, Barmada has an h-index of 20. According to the Scopus, he has an h-index of 16.

== Books ==
- Orthopedic Surgery Case Studies: 40 Case Histories Related to Orthopedic Surgery
- Pathophysiology of Orthopedic Diseases

== Selected journal publications ==
- Misoprostol Inhibits Polymethylmethacrylate-Stimulated Lysosomal Degranulation and IL-1 Release from Neutrophils
- Optimisation of the posterior stabilised tibial post for greater femoral rollback after total knee arthroplasty—a finite element analysis
- Factors influencing initial cup stability in total hip arthroplasty
- Polymorphonuclear leukocyte degranulation with exposure to polymethylmethacrylate nanoparticles
