= Sharaa family =

Syrian political family

Sharaa family عائلة الشرع
- Political family
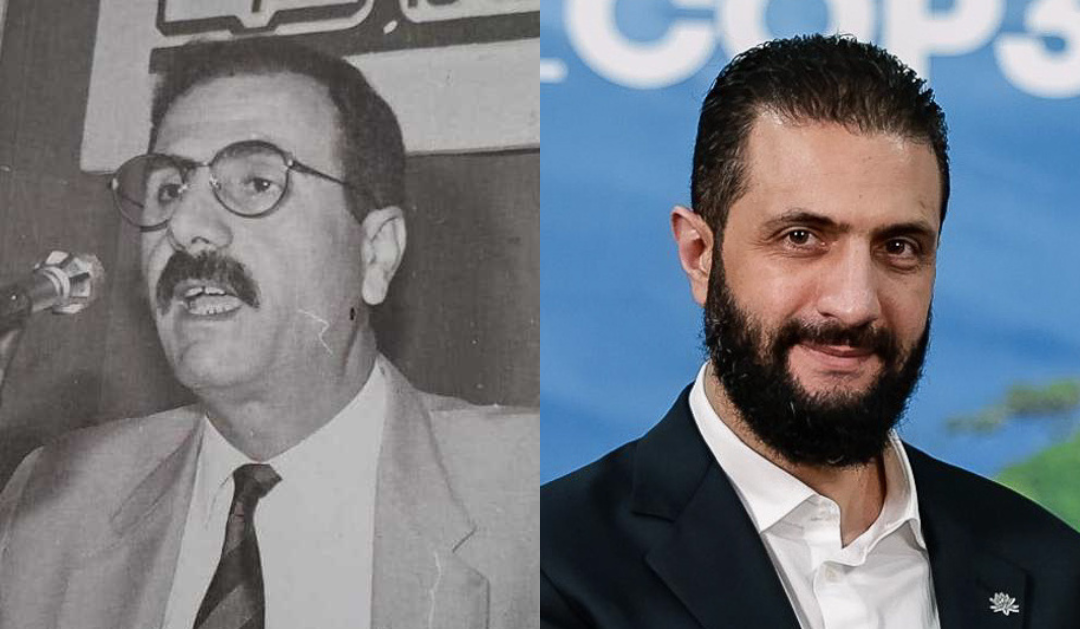
- From left to right: Hussein al-Sharaa and Ahmed al-Sharaa
- Parent family: Awfiya of Banu Zuhrah of the Quraysh
- Country: Syria
- Current region: Middle East
- Origin: Jibeen, Golan Heights
- Founder: Salama al-Shara'a ibn Abd al-Ghani al-Awfi al-Zawayati
- Current head: Ahmed al-Sharaa
- Members: List: Muhammad ibn Khalid al-Sharaa Talib Abdul Majeed al-Sharaa Ali al-Sharaa Hussein al-Sharaa Ahmed al-Sharaa Maher al-Sharaa Hazem al-Sharaa Jamal al-Sharaa Shahenda Sara al-Sharaa Oweis al-Sharaa Zahra al-Sharaa
- Connected members: List: Ahmad al-Droubi Abdul Rahman al-Dabbagh Maher Marwan Latifa al-Droubi Widad al-Khaled Tatiana Zakirova Sheikh Abdul Ghaffar al-Droubi Ghazi al-Droubi Abu Hamza Aladdin al-Droubi (ancestor) Khaled Hashish Salama
- Connected families: Al-Droubi family Ruqaybat clan
- Traditions: Sunni Islam

The Sharaa family (Note: Arabic: عائلة الشرع, romanized: ʿĀ’ilat al-Sharā‘) is a prominent Syrian political family. Its most prominent member is Ahmed al-Sharaa, who has served as President of Syria since 2025. The family is active in politics, and other notable members include Ahmed al-Sharaa's father, Hussein al-Sharaa; his brother, Maher al-Sharaa; and Hazem al-Sharaa. The family has played a significant role in Syria during the transitional period following the fall of the Assad regime. Ahmed al-Sharaa has Russian family ties through Tatiana Zakirova, a Russian businesswoman who is married to Maher al-Sharaa and is Ahmed al-Sharaa's sister-in-law.

The appointment of his brother, Maher al-Sharaa, as Secretary-General to the Presidency has been viewed by some observers as an example of nepotism. Observers noted that the move marked another step toward increasing the family's influence, following Maher's tenure as acting Minister of Health in the caretaker government established after the fall of the Assad regime. Hazem al-Sharaa occupied a senior political position as Vice President of the Supreme Council for Economic Development.

== Ancestry ==
The Sharaa family traces its roots to Mecca through their ancestor, the Sahabi Abd al-Rahman ibn Awf of the Banu Zuhrah clan of the Quraysh. Around 700 AD, during the early Islamic conquests, they migrated north to present-day Jordan, settling in Al-Kafarat overlooking the Yarmuk River. By 1300 AD, the family had moved to Adhraat (present-day Daraa) and later returned to the Yarmouk River, with some members eventually migrating to the Sea of Galilee and settling in Jibin near Fiq, where they became known as the Awfiya tribe.

Around 1650 AD, the family settled in the Hauran region, where its members dispersed across different areas.

=== Genealogy ===
Hussein al-Sharaa stated that the Sharaa family traces its origins to the village of Jibeen, near Fiq, the capital of the al-Zawiya region, in southern Quneitra Governorate in the Golan Heights, Syria. According to The New York Times, the family discussed politics at home but had no record of involvement in Islamic extremism.

In August 2025, Hussein al-Sharaa told SyriaTV that his family traces its roots to Hauran, Palestine, and the Damascus area, descending from noble ancestry and that they possess blood links to the Ashraf. He added that they have kinship ties with the Ruqaybat clan, which lives along the shores of the Sea of Galilee and also extends across the northern Beni Kenana region. Hussein explained that the name Sharaa originated after one of their grandfathers Sheikh Salama ibn Abd al-Ghani al-Awfi al-Zawayati, went to Al-Azhar al-Sharif in Egypt. He said that, upon his return, people came to him to resolve matters of marriage, divorce, and family disputes often saying, "The Sharia has come to you." As a result, the nickname was eventually given to the family.

The family is a Sunni family that emphasizes education and political involvement.

== Paternal ==
Hussein al-Sharaa's grandfather, Muhammad ibn Khalid al-Sharaa (1899–1932), was a key participant in the Zoya Revolution against French rule. His uncle, Talib Abdul Majeed al-Sharaa (1855–1956), was among the most prominent leaders of the Zawiya Revolution. Both were involved in resistance to French colonialism and were sentenced to death in absentia; however, the sentences were not carried out. Hussein al-Sharaa's father, Ali al-Sharaa, was born in Fiq in the Golan Heights. He worked in trade and was a landowner who owned much of the area. The family owned about 85% of Fiq's land, including around 600 dunums of agricultural land that belonged to his paternal grandfather.

== Immediate family ==
=== Wives ===
Latifa al-Droubi was born in 1984 in Al-Qaryatayn, a rural town in Syria's Homs Governorate, and holds a Master's degree in Arabic language and literature from the Department of Arabic Language at the Faculty of Arts and Humanities, Idlib University, which she earned in 2025. Al-Droubi met Ahmed al-Sharaa while they were both students at Damascus University. They married in 2012.

She is the current First Lady of Syria. Her family includes prominent figures such as Sheikh Abdul Ghaffar al-Droubi, a renowned Quran reciter from Syria who died in Jeddah, Saudi Arabia, in 2009, and Ghazi al-Droubi, who served as Minister of Oil and Mineral Resources from 1984 to 1987 under President Hafez al-Assad.

Turkish media has claimed that her grandfather, Aladdin al-Droubi, who served as the prime minister of Syria from 26 July until his assassination on 21 August 1920, was also the personal doctor of Ottoman Sultan Abdul Hamid II.

=== Children ===
Latifa al-Droubi and Ahmed al-Sharaa have three children. On 1 April 2026, during Ahmed al-Sharaa's visit to the United Kingdom, he participated in an interview at Chatham House with Bronwen Maddox. During the interview, al-Sharaa corrected Maddox, clarifying that he has one daughter, along with two sons, rather than two daughters. When asked whether he would want his daughter to become a future president of Syria, he stated that running public affairs is a major responsibility and that he would not wish the role on any of his children.

== Parents ==
=== Hussein al-Sharaa ===
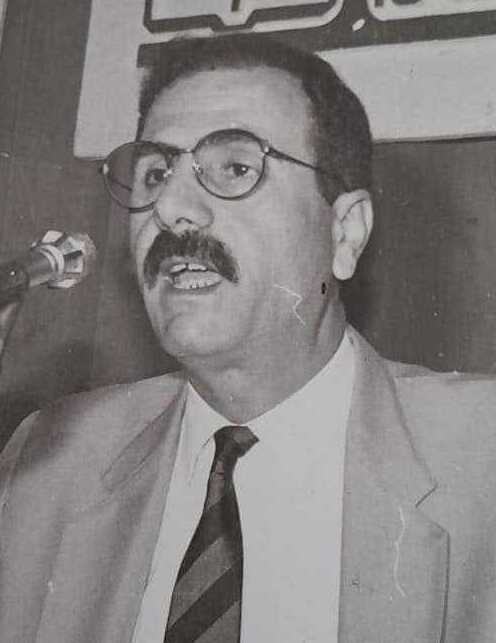
Hussein al-Sharaa, the father of Ahmed al-Sharaa

Hussein al-Sharaa was born in 1946 in Daraa, Syrian Republic. The family were displaced in 1967 after the Israeli occupation during the Six-Day War. While working in the ministry of petroleum under Hafez al-Assad's rule, he ran for a seat in the Quneitra Provincial Council and won. During this period, he also attempted to secure a seat in the People's Assembly in 1973 but was unsuccessful. He later moved to Saudi Arabia with his family, where he lived from 1979 to 1988. His son Ahmed was born there in 1982.

He remained in the Syrian oil sector until 1979, when he was hired by the Saudi Ministry of Petroleum as an economic researcher, where he wrote extensively on the subject and published several books. The family returned to Syria in 1989, settled in the affluent Mezzeh neighbourhood of Damascus, and opened a real estate office. It is said that his family owned a shop in the upscale Mezzeh district of Damascus.

Hussein is married to Widad al-Khaled, who is the mother of Ahmed al-Sharaa.

=== Widad al-Khaled ===
Ahmed al-Sharaa's mother is a geography teacher, and her name is Widad al-Khaled. In June 2025, Ahmed al-Sharaa said that his mother believed he was still alive throughout the seven years of separation and the hardships he endured before assuming power. The first public appearance of al-Khaled was on 22 April 2026, when al-Khaled met Fatima bint Mubarak Al Ketbi during Ahmed al-Sharaa's visit to the United Arab Emirates, where al-Khaled accompanied him on a working visit.

== Siblings ==
Ahmed al-Sharaa has four brothers and two sisters. His sister’s name is Shahenda.

On 24 February 2026, Hussein al-Sharaa told Zaman al-Wasl that President Ahmed al-Sharaa intended to dismiss his brothers, Maher al-Sharaa and Hazem al-Sharaa, from their government positions. According to Zaman al-Wasl, the move was part of an effort to restructure the president’s inner circle and address criticism over nepotism.

=== Maher al-Sharaa ===
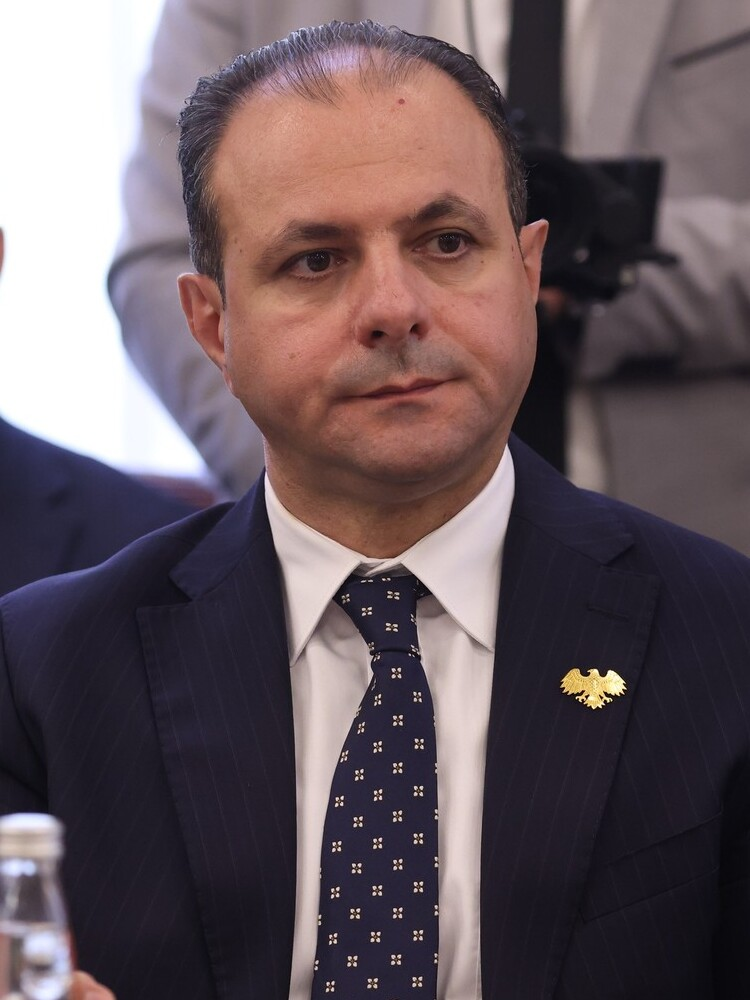
Maher al-Sharaa, brother of Ahmed al-Sharaa

Maher al-Sharaa was born in 1972 in Damascus, Syria. He is the eldest son of the Syrian economist and writer Hussein al-Sharaa. He previously used the name "Maher al-Hussein" and kept it secret that he was Ahmed's brother. The Syrian Salvation Government (SSG) stated that al-Sharaa served at Syria's Minister of Health as head of the gynecology department until 2012, when he was arrested and fled the Assad regime. According to the SSG, he worked between several regional Arab and Western countries and in northern Syria from 2022 to 2023. Based on information from Russian border authorities, al-Sharaa flew to İzmir, Turkey, in July 2022 and has not returned to Russia since. He later resurfaced in Syria as part of the Syrian caretaker government.

On 16 December 2024, he was appointed acting Minister of Health in the Syrian caretaker government. According to the Shaam News Network, the appointment was seen as nepotistic, since al-Sharaa is the brother of Syrian de facto leader (and later president) Ahmed al-Sharaa. On 5 April 2025, the Syrian Presidency appointed al-Sharaa as Secretary-General, succeeding Abdul Rahman Salama, in what was reportedly considered a high-ranking position within the Syrian state.

On 9 May 2026, as part of a partial government shuffle, al-Sharaa was dismissed and replaced by former Homs Governor Abdul Rahman al-Aama as Secretary-General. Al-Aama was appointed through a presidential decree issued by Ahmed al-Sharaa.

=== Hazem al-Sharaa ===
Hazem al-Sharaa was born in 1974 to Hussein al-Sharaa, a prominent economist. He studied law at Damascus University and became a registered member of the Damascus Bar Association in February 2007. He later earned a master's degree in Legal and Economic Sciences from the Egyptian American International University in January 2007, followed by a doctorate in the same field from the same institution in December 2013. Al-Sharaa had held various positions in relation to management and sales, including positions at PepsiCo in Syria and Iraq. He was the Vice President of the Supreme Council for Economic Development and the older brother of Ahmed al-Sharaa.

On 27 February 2025, Syrian businessmen reported a meeting between the president, Ahmed al-Sharaa, and a group of Syrian investors and business leaders. In their statements, some participants referred to Hazem al-Sharaa as the acting "Director of the Investment Agency" of Syria. Some reports said he was appointed as acting director of the Syrian Investment Agency, but a later investigation by Reuters in July 2025 showed he holds no official position. The Reuters investigation revealed that Hazem al‑Sharaa was supervising a covert economic committee tasked with restructuring Syria's economy following the fall of Ba'athist regime.

On 8 May 2026, i24NEWS reported that Hazem resigned from his role as Vice President of the Supreme Council for Economic Development.

=== Jamal al-Sharaa ===
Little is known about Jamal al-Sharaa, except that he once worked in the Information technology education field and moved to Egypt around 2013. He is the elder brother of Ahmed al-Sharaa.

The first public appearance of al-Sharaa was on 17 April 2025, when he appeared alongside Minister of Culture Mohammed Yassin Saleh at the guesthouse of Sheikh Farhan al-Marsoumi in Deir ez-Zor Governorate. The visit triggered significant controversy due to al-Marsoumi's reputation as a staunch loyalist to Iranian-backed militias and his alleged involvement in drug trafficking and serious human rights abuses against the local population. Al-Marsoumi was widely regarded as a central figure linked to Iran's Islamic Revolutionary Guard Corps in eastern Syria. He played a major role in recruiting youth into the 47th Regiment, an Iranian-backed unit, and in solidifying Tehran's influence over both the military and social structures in the area. Furthermore, al-Marsoumi has reportedly overseen large-scale arms and narcotics smuggling networks, operating under the protection of the 4th Armoured Division and leveraging close ties with Maher al-Assad.

On 20 April 2025, the Syrian Presidency released a statement addressing the controversy surrounding the gathering at al-Marsoumi's guesthouse. In response to widespread discussion about the presence of government figures at the event, the presidency clarified that Jamal al-Sharaa does not hold any official government position or title and does not enjoy any formal privileges. Notably, the statement made no mention of Saleh, focusing exclusively on clarifying that Jamal al-Sharaa holds no official government position and attended the event in a personal capacity as a private citizen invited by the organizers.

On 20 August 2025, Reuters reported that Ahmed al-Sharaa rebuked more than 100 loyalists over corruption and for arriving in luxury vehicles, and on 6 October 2025, he shut down a business office owned by his brother, Jamal al-Sharaa, as part of an anti-corruption crackdown. His brother, Jamal, denied reports that the Syrian leader reprimanded officials over displays of wealth during a meeting in Idlib province, describing the claims as fabrications intended to distort the truth, while Ahmad Mohammad Deeb Tu'meh, Director of Political Affairs in Rural Damascus, also said the report contained false information, adding, "The president did not address any issue related to luxury cars abroad. I attended the entire meeting and did not hear any such remarks."

== Other relatives ==
Ahmed al-Sharaa’s nephew, Oweis al-Sharaa, was appointed Secretary-General of the People's Palace. Another cousin and brother-in-law, Maher Marwan, was appointed governor of Damascus. Ahmed al-Sharaa’s brother-in-law, Khaled Hashish Salama, who is married to his sister Shahenda, worked for the Ba'ath Party branch in Daraa. He was detained by Branch 265 for possessing ammunition and released on 1 April 2013. On 28 February 2014, Salama was reportedly kidnapped by an armed group, and his status remains unknown.

While some reports said that Hussein al-Sharaa and Farouk al-Sharaa are related, this fact is denied by MENA Research Center. In August 2025, Hussein said on SyriaTV that the Al-Sharaa family in Daraa, to which former Syrian Vice President Farouk al-Sharaa belongs, has no direct kinship ties, but he pointed to an ancient lineage dating back to the 1930s.

In June 2025, during Syrian President Ahmed al-Sharaa's visit to Daraa Governorate, he met his father's aunt, Zahra al-Sharaa, known as "Umm Ahmed." Syria TV reported that she was his father's aunt. In an interview, she stated that she had not seen Ahmed in 30 years but had previously met his father. Ahmed al-Sharaa's brother-in-law, known as "Abu Hamza", works in Maher al-Sharaa's office. In August 2026, Sara al-Sharaa, the niece of Ahmed al-Sharaa, married Hassan Qassem.

=== Abdul Rahman al-Dabbagh ===
Abdul Rahman al-Dabbagh was born in 1987 in Jdeidat Artouz, Damascus Governorate. He is the cousin of Ahmed al-Sharaa.

Al-Dabbagh joined the Al-Nusra Front, where he served in the group's security apparatus under the alias "Owais al-Shami", also known as "Wissam", alongside his brother, Abdul Azim al-Dabbagh, who used the alias "Aws Abu Muhammad". Abdul Rahman al-Dabbagh and his brother, Abdul Azim al-Dabbagh, worked in Barzeh and Qaboun before relocating to Eastern Ghouta, where Abdul Rahman al-Dabbagh remained throughout the internal conflict until the area's fall in 2018.

After leaving Eastern Ghouta, Abdul Rahman al-Dabbagh moved to northern Syria, where he continued working in the security apparatus of Hay'at Tahrir al-Sham and was responsible for the agents file before later overseeing security operations in areas under the control of the Syrian National Army.

Following the fall of the Assad regime, al-Dabbagh was appointed security official for the Mezzeh district and its suburbs on 31 December 2024. He made his first public appearance as security official on 4 February 2025, holding the rank of lieutenant colonel and serving as head of the Public Security Department in Damascus. He was subsequently appointed Director of the Damascus Security Directorate before being transferred to the intelligence service. He was removed from the position of Director of the Damascus Security Directorate following the appointment of Brigadier General Osama Muhammad Atika as Commander of Internal Security in Damascus on 25 May 2025. Al-Dabbagh then appeared as the Director of Foreign Intelligence in Syria and made official visits to Iraq and Lebanon in that role.

=== Ahmad al-Droubi ===
Ahmad al-Droubi, the brother-in-law of Ahmed al-Sharaa through his wife, Latifa al-Droubi, was appointed Secretary-General of the Central Bank of Syria.

Ahmad al-Droubi has ties to jihadist organizations and has had close relations with the Al-Nusra Front. Al-Droubi suddenly defected from Al-Nusra Front and joined ISIS in 2015. He was reported to have sent al-Sharaa to Iraq and had assigned al-Droubi to purchase Concourse missiles for $120,000, which was reportedly paid to him directly by al-Sharaa. He was also alleged to have transferred $120,000 to ISIS. After ISIS was defeated in Iraq, he returned to Syria, specifically to Raqqa, and later tried to enter areas controlled by Hay’at Tahrir al-Sham in Idlib. During this attempt, he was said to have expressed regret and requested permission, but his request was denied, and he was asked to return the embezzled funds.

=== Tatiana Zakirova ===
Tatiana Zakirova is a Russian citizen who also holds Syrian citizenship. In the 2000s, she held stakes in a vehicle inspection firm and in a landscape design company until at least 2020. She partnered with her sister, Yevgenia Zherebtsova, whose separate firm received up to 45 million rubles (US$526,000) in state landscaping contracts from the city of Voronezh. Tatiana Zakirova comes from a family with an extensive business presence in Russia. She is a Russian businesswoman.

Zakirova is the sister-in-law of Syrian President Ahmed al-Sharaa, the brother of her husband, Maher al-Sharaa. The couple has three children: Rashid, Maria, and Kamel.

== Summary table ==
Name	Relationship to Ahmed al-Sharaa	Nationality	Office	Occupation	Ref.
Widad al-Khaled	Mother of Ahmed al-Sharaa	Syrian	Unknown	Geography teacher	
Hussein al-Sharaa	Father of Ahmed al-Sharaa	Syrian	Unknown	Economist, researcher, and writer	
Maher al-Sharaa	Brother of Ahmed al-Sharaaa	Syrian	Unknown	Politician and physician	
Hazem al-Sharaa	Older brother of Ahmed al-Sharaa	Syrian	Unknown	Lawyer	
Ahmed al-Sharaa	Himself	Syrian	President of Syria	Politician and former rebel commander	
Jamal al-Sharaa	Elder brother of Ahmed al-Sharaa	Syrian	Unknown	Information technology education field	
Shahenda	Sister of Ahmed al-Sharaa	Syrian	Unknown	Unknown	
Latifa al-Droubi	Wife of Ahmed al-Sharaa	Syrian	First Lady of Syria	Unknown	
Tatiana Zakirova	Sister-in-law of Ahmed al-Sharaa (through Maher)	Russian, Syrian	Unknown	Businesswoman	
Oweis al-Sharaa	Nephew of Ahmed al-Sharaa	Syrian	Secretary-General of the People's Palace	Unknown	
Sara al-Sharaa	Niece of Ahmed al-Sharaa	Syrian	Unknown	Unknown	
Ahmad al-Droubi	Brother-in-law of Ahmed al-Sharaa (through Latifa)	Syrian	Secretary-General of the Central Bank of Syria	Unknown	
Khaled Hashish Salama	Brother-in-law of Ahmed al-Sharaa (through Shahenda)	Syrian	Unknown	Ba'ath Party branch in Daraa	
Maher Marwan	Cousin and brother-in-law of Ahmed al-Sharaa	Syrian	Governor of Damascus	Unknown	
Abdul Rahman al-Dabbagh	Cousin of Ahmed al-Sharaa	Syrian	Director of Foreign Intelligence in Syria	Unknown	
Abu Hamza	Brother-in-law of Ahmed al-Sharaa	Syrian	Unknown	Maher al-Sharaa's office	

== See also ==
- Assad family
- Atassi family
