= Latifa al-Droubi =

First Lady of Syria since 2025

- لطيفة الدروبي

First Lady of Syria
- Current
- Assumed role 29 January 2025
- President: Ahmed al-Sharaa
- Preceded by: Asma al-Assad^{[a]}

Personal details
- Born: Latifa al-Droubi; 1984 (age 41–42) Al-Qaryatayn, Syria
- Spouse: Ahmed al-Sharaa (m. 2012)
- Children: 3
- Relatives: Aladdin al-Droubi (ancestor); Sharaa family (by marriage)
- Education: Idlib University
- Role vacant from 8 December 2024 to 29 January 2025.

Latifa al-Droubi (Note: Arabic: لَطيْفةُ الدُّروبيِّ) (born c. 1984) is the First Lady of Syria and has been since 2025. She assumed the role when her husband, Ahmed al-Sharaa, was appointed president of Syria following the fall of the Assad regime in December 2024.

She was born in Al-Qaryatayn, a rural town in Syria's Homs Governorate. As First Lady, Latifa joins official events alongside her husband.

== Biography ==
Latifa al-Droubi was born in 1984 in Al-Qaryatayn, a rural town in Syria's Homs Governorate. She holds a Master's degree in Arabic language and literature. She earned her degree from the Arabic Language Department at the Faculty of Arts and Humanities, Idlib University, in 2025.

Turkish media has reported that her grandfather, Aladdin al-Droubi, who served as the prime minister of Syria from 26 July until his assassination on 21 August 1920, was also the personal doctor of Ottoman Sultan Abdul Hamid II.

Her family includes prominent figures such as Sheikh Abdul Ghaffar al-Droubi, a renowned Quran reciter from Syria who died in Jeddah, Saudi Arabia, in 2009, and Ghazi al-Droubi, who served as Minister of Oil and Mineral Resources from 1984 to 1987 under President Hafez al-Assad. Her sister is also said to be married to Maher Marwan, the governor of Damascus.

Al-Droubi met Ahmed al-Sharaa while they were both students at Damascus University. They married in 2012 and have three children.

== First Lady of Syria (2025–present) ==
=== Early actions ===
After her husband, Ahmed al-Sharaa, was appointed President of Syria by the Syrian General Command in January 2025, she was introduced as his wife during a meeting with a delegation of Syrian women residing in the United States, dismissing social media rumors about him having multiple spouses. Her husband affirmed that she is his only wife.

It had been reported that al-Droubi generally wore a hijab, the conventional Syrian attire for women, but no niqab or face veil as sometimes speculated. This was confirmed on 3 February 2025, when social media platforms circulated footage of al-Droubi performing the Umrah pilgrimage in Mecca with her husband during his first official visit to Saudi Arabia. The next day, Turkish first lady Emine Erdoğan posted a photo taken with al-Droubi after she arrived in Turkey with her husband as part of a state visit.

The following month, al-Droubi appeared alongside her husband at the People's Palace in Damascus in celebration of Eid al-Fitr and also to honour the children of martyrs.

=== Official duties ===
"Today I stand with you not as a First Lady, but as a Syrian student who carried her dream in her heart and pursued it despite challenges, completing her academic journey at beloved Idlib University. I stand on land that has endured, land scarred by war, and that has held thousands of stories full of life.[...]"

— Latifa al-Droubi (September 8, 2025)

On 7 June 2025, she appeared in public with her husband for a meeting with several Syrian women in celebration of Eid al-Adha. The following day, a video appeared showing al-Droubi walking with her husband, surrounded by security personnel, through Tishreen Park in Damascus alongside the Syrian people. She appeared with her husband on 3 July at the Presidential Palace for the launch of Syria's new visual identity, attended by various ministers and governors.

On 5 September, the Syrian government launched the Syrian Development Fund to help rebuild the damage caused by the Assad regime, with al-Droubi donating $5,000. On 8 September, she attended the graduation ceremony at Idlib University with her husband. On 12 September, she appeared with her husband at the People's Palace alongside U.S. Admiral Brad Cooper, U.S. Envoy to Syria Tom Barrack, and their delegation. There, she met Susan Cooper, wife of U.S. Admiral Brad Cooper, to discuss humanitarian issues, focusing on women’s role in promoting understanding. On 21 November, al-Droubi and her husband met with a group of children of martyrs and students on the occasion of World Children’s Day. On 8 December, al-Droubi and her husband attended a gathering at the Damascus Conference Palace in celebration of Liberation Day. On 29 December, her husband officially launched the new national currency at the Conferences’ Palace in Damascus, attended by al-Droubi and the Governor of the Central Bank of Syria, Abdulkader Husrieh.

On 6 February 2026, al-Droubi and her husband attended the opening ceremony of the 57th Damascus International Book Fair in Damascus, Syria. On 22 February, al-Droubi visited the Islamic Charity Association Orphanage in Homs, where she conducted a comprehensive tour of the facility’s departments and reviewed its various educational and vocational rehabilitation programmes. On 13 March 2026, al-Droubi visited the al-Ibda'a ("Creativity") School in Daraya to review its educational environment following its rehabilitation and reopening to students. She also met with school administrators and teachers to discuss local educational conditions and staff needs.

On 21 March 2026, her husband, accompanied by al-Droubi, received a group of Syrian women at the People’s Palace in Damascus during the dual celebration of Eid al-Fitr and Mother's Day.

=== Advocacies ===
As First Lady, al-Droubi is the founder and patron of the Syrian Arab Republic's Council of Ministers for Children and Youth. She leads the national school dropout prevention campaign and manages local and international initiatives to establish the Martyrs' Children Schools. She also supervises the Kudrat Center, which provides rehabilitation, psychological support, and vocational services to people with disabilities and individuals affected by the Syrian civil war.

=== Public image ===
Al-Droubi had maintained a private life away from the public eye, despite her husband's considerable media presence. A reporter from The Economist asked her husband if his wife would be the First Lady of Syria. He explained that the president's wife traditionally holds the role, not a random woman hired for it, and that she serves society rather than stands above it. US-based Syrian political analyst Aymen Abd al-Nour said al-Droubi's tone, body language, and eye contact in her first public speech at Idlib University surpassed those of Hind Kabawat and Houda Atassi.

Fidel Rahmati of Khaama Press noted that Ahmed al-Sharaa's involvement of his wife in official events is part of his effort to appear more moderate and to portray the Syrian transitional government as modern and balanced. He added that her increasing visibility, particularly at official events, reflects a change in her husband’s approach to public relations. Hani al-Sibai, a UK-based cleric, condemned al-Droubi’s public role and accused her husband of defying Sharia to appeal to the West.

On 7 June 2025, during a meeting with several Syrian women in celebration of Eid al-Adha, Ahmed al-Sharaa reflected on his wife, al-Droubi.

She had little information about the work conditions, and she was discovering all of that about the work process. But she endured with me the bombing and endured the migration and displacement. I think we changed 49 houses during the past period, at a rate of one house every 3 months. This is difficult for a woman. We became like nomads, but nomads know what to take with them, but we are uneducated about the nature of nomadism. We lived in very difficult places. She lived with me in caves and she lived with me in poultry farms as well. She lived with me in difficult places, and she lived with me in good places at the same time, depending on the work conditions. I tried a lot to get her to leave for another place that was safer for her and the children, but she always refused and remained steadfast. She would say the least: I will meet you in a smile, I will be by your side.

=== Foreign trips ===
On 11 April 2025, she appeared with her husband to attend the fourth Antalya Diplomacy Forum in Antalya, Turkey. There, she met with First lady Emine Erdoğan and discussed the possibility of working together to help women and children in Syria. Following the meeting, al-Droubi signed the global goodwill declaration of the Zero Waste Project.

On 24 November, al-Droubi attended the opening ceremony of the "WISE 2025" Summit in Doha, Qatar, which was also attended by several prominent international figures, including Moza bint Nasser, Chairperson of the Qatar Foundation for Education, Science and Community Development.

On 25 November, al-Droubi joined a panel discussion titled "Placing Education at the Center of Economic Opportunities and Social Resilience" during the 12th World Innovation Summit for Education in Doha, Qatar. She also met with Moza bint Nasser; Hind bint Hamad bin Khalifa Al Thani, the Foundation’s Vice Chairperson and CEO; and Qatari Minister of Education and Higher Education, Lolwah Al-Khater.

On 5 December, al-Droubi attended the fifth Istanbul Education Summit at the Atatürk Cultural Center in Istanbul, Turkey. The event was attended by First Lady Emine Erdoğan, international guests, Turkish officials, as well as Lebanese First Lady Nehmat Aoun and Nigerian First Lady Remi Tinubu. In her speech, al-Droubi stressed the importance of education for human and societal development and encouraged stronger international partnerships to support programs that empower young generations. She visited the İmam Hatip school in Istanbul and met with the Turkish Minister of Family and Social Services, Mahinur Özdemir Göktaş.

On 11 November 2026, al-Droubi attended a roundtable hosted by Emine Erdoğan in Antalya, Turkey, alongside the spouses of several heads of state and government, to discuss the Zero Waste initiative and strengthen international cooperation in addressing climate change. The meeting was held on the sidelines of the 31st United Nations Climate Change Conference.

== Notes ==
Honorary titles
Preceded by Asma al-Assad (2024)	First Lady of Syria; 2025–present	Incumbent
