= Mohammad Ghazi al-Jalali government =

2024 Syrian government

- 96th government of the Syrian Arab Republic
- Date formed: 23 September 2024
- Date dissolved: 8 December 2024

People and organisations
- President: Bashar al-Assad
- Prime Minister: Mohammad Ghazi al-Jalali
- No. of ministers: 29
- Member parties: ▌Ba'ath Party; ▌SSNP; ▌Communist Party (Unified); ▌ADUP
- Status in legislature: Majority government 185 / 250 (74%)

History
- Election: 2024
- Legislature term: 4th People's Assembly
- Budget: LS 35,500 billion (Note: US$5 billion)
- Predecessor: Arnous II
- Successor: Caretaker

The Mohammad Ghazi al-Jalali government was formed after appointment by the president of Syria on 23 September 2024 and new Council of Ministers took the oath of office on 24 September 2024, after the 2024 Syrian parliamentary election held on 15 July 2024. This replaced the caretaker ministry formed in July. The government was the 96th since Syria gained independence from the Ottoman Empire in 1918 and was the ninth and last during the presidency of Bashar al-Assad, as well as the last government of Ba'athist Syria.

The government was dissolved with the fall of the Assad regime on 8 December 2024. However, al-Jalali remained in office in a caretaker capacity until 10 December 2024 after agreeing to help oversee the transition of power. He then transferred power to Mohammed al-Bashir, prime minister of the Syrian Salvation Government (SSG), who subsequently lead the Syrian caretaker government.

== Formation ==
President Bashar al-Assad accepted the entire cabinet's resignation after a meeting on 29 March 2011. Al-Assad then appointed outgoing Prime Minister Muhammad Naji al-Otari to continue as caretaker prime minister until a new government is appointed. On 3 April 2011, Assad appointed Minister of Agriculture Adel Safar the new prime minister. On 6 April 2011, the state-run al-Ekhbariya TV channel said that Foreign Minister Walid al-Moallem, Minister of Defense Dawoud Rajiha, Minister of Endowment and Religious Affairs Mohammed Abdul-Sattar al-Sayed, and Minister of Presidential Palace Affairs Mansour Fadlallah Azzam would remain in the new cabinet. On 9 April 2011, DayPress News reported the new cabinet was expected to be announced in the next week. On 14 April 2011, a new cabinet was officially announced.

On 9 February 2013, President Assad changed seven ministers in the cabinet. The cabinet reshuffle included the ministries of oil, finance, social affairs, labor, housing, public works and agriculture.

In July 2016, president Assad issued Decree no. 203 for 2016 which listed the new Syrian government.

The First Hussein Arnous government was formed after 2020 Syrian parliamentary election. A new government was formed after 2021 Syrian presidential election under Hussein Arnous.

On 14 September 2024, president al-Assad issued a decree charging Mohammad Ghazi al-Jalali with the task of forming a new cabinet. On 23 September 2024, president al-Assad issued a decree forming the new ministry with Mohammad Ghazi al-Jalali as the head of it.

Following the fall of the Assad regime on 8 December 2024, Mohammad Ghazi al-Jalali continued as caretaker prime minister pending the formation of the Syrian caretaker government.

== Cabinet ==
Portfolio	Minister	Took office	Left office	Party
Prime Minister	Mohammad Ghazi al-Jalali	14 September 2024	8 December 2024	Ba'ath Party
Minister of Defense	Ali Mahmoud Abbas	28 April 2022	8 December 2024	Ba'ath Party
Minister of Foreign Affairs and Expatriates	Bassam al-Sabbagh	23 September 2024	8 December 2024	Ba'ath Party
Minister of Health	Ahmad Damiriyeh	23 September 2024	8 December 2024	
Minister of Agriculture and Agrarian Reform	Fayez al-Miqdad	23 September 2024	8 December 2024	
Minister of Electricity	Sinjar Taama	23 September 2024	8 December 2024	
Minister of Oil and Mineral Resources	Firas Hassan Kaddour	29 March 2023	8 December 2024	
Minister of Culture	Diala Barakat	23 September 2024	8 December 2024	SSNP
Minister of Information	Ziad Ghosn	23 September 2024	8 December 2024	
Minister of Endowments	Mohammed Abdul Sattar	8 December 2007	8 December 2024	Ba'ath Party
Minister of Transport	Zouhair Khazim	30 August 2020	8 December 2024	
Minister of Justice	Ahmad al-Sayyed	30 August 2020	8 December 2024	
Minister of Industry	Mohammad Samer al-Khalil	23 September 2024	8 December 2024	
Minister of Interior	Mohammad Khaled al-Rahmoun	26 November 2018	8 December 2024	Ba'ath Party
Minister of Communications and Technology	Iyad al-Khatib	26 November 2018	8 December 2024	
Minister of Water Resources	Moataz Qattan	23 September 2024	8 December 2024	
Minister of Labor and Social Affairs	Samar al-Sebai	23 September 2024	8 December 2024	
Minister of Public Works and Housing	Hamza Ali	23 September 2024	8 December 2024	
Minister of Local Administration and Environment	Louay Kharibah	23 September 2024	8 December 2024	
Minister of Education	Muhammad Amer Mardini	8 August 2023	8 December 2024	
Minister of Higher Education and Scientific Research	Bassam Hasan	23 September 2024	8 December 2024	
Minister of Finance	Riad Abdel Ra'ouf	23 September 2024	8 December 2024	
Minister of Economy and Foreign Trade	Mohammad Rabie Qalaaji	23 September 2024	8 December 2024	
Minister of Internal Trade and Consumer Protection	Louay al-Munajjid	23 September 2024	8 December 2024	
Minister of Tourism	Mohammad Rami Radwan Martini	26 November 2018	8 December 2024	
Minister of Administrative Development	Salam Safaf	29 March 2017	8 December 2024	
Minister of State for People's Assembly Affairs	Ahmed Bustaji	29 March 2023	8 December 2024	Communist (Unified)
Minister of State for Investment Affairs, Vital Projects and Southern Development	Ahmad Hadla	23 September 2024	8 December 2024	ADUP

== See also ==
- Council of Ministers (Syria)
- List of Syrian governments
- Government ministries of Syria
- List of prime ministers of Syria
- Government of Syria
- Politics of Syria
- Political parties in Syria
