= Syrian Space Agency =

Syrian governmental organization

Syrian Space Agency (SSA)
Agency overview
- Formed: March 18, 2014; 12 years ago
- Preceding agency: General Organization of Remote Sensing
- Jurisdiction: Government of Syria
- Headquarters: Damascus, Syria
- Motto: Using space technology for research and observing the Earth
- Agency executive: Abdul Salam Haykal, Minister of Communications and Technology

The Syrian Space Agency (Arabic: وكالة الفضاء والطيران السورية, romanized: Wakālat al-Faḍāʼ wa-al-Ṭayarān al-Sūrīyah) is a government run organization overseen by the Syrian Minister of Communications and Technology, Iyad Mohammad al-Khatib, and dedicated to space exploration.

== History ==
- On the 18th of March 2014, after three years of Syrian Civil War, the government announces the creation of the Syrian Space Agency.
- On the 19th of August 2016, the Syrian Government and the Russian Government signed an agreement pledging cooperation in the areas of Space Research and Remote Sensing. It was signed by the general director of the authority for remote sensing, Dr Osama-al Ammar, on the Syrian side, and Igor Komarov, the head of Roscosmos, on the Russian side.
- On the 11th of December 2018, the Syrian Minister of Communications and Technology, Iyad Khatib, said during a visit to space research facilities that "a road map for the Syrian space program, as well as for the launch of the first artificial satellite into Earth’s orbit should be developed".

== See also ==
- General Organization of Remote Sensing
