= Al-Sharaa (surname) =

Ahmed al-Sharaa (born 1982) has been the president of Syria since 2025.

Al-Sharaa and variants may also refer to:

- Farouk al-Sharaa (born 1938), Syrian politician and diplomat; former Vice President of Syria
- Faysal Shaban Alsharaa, South African cyclist; bronze medalist at the 2009 African Road Championships
- Majed al-Sharaa, Jordanian soccer executive at Ittihad Al-Ramtha SC
- Mamoun Sharaa, Arabic author who participated in the 2019 International Prize for Arabic Fiction Nadwa
- Michael Sharaa, U.S. screenwriter, who wrote the screenplay for Gettysburg (1993 film)
- Mnaizel Atiyah Al-Sharaa (born 1957), Jordanian politician; member of the 18th Parliament of Jordan
- Mohammed al-Sharaa, Iraqi official involved in the Al Qa'qaa high explosives controversy
- Munkhbold Sharaa (Japanese: Kyokusetsuzan Eiji), a Mongolian sumo wrestler; a non-Japanese sumo wrestler in Japan
- Zaid Al-Sharaa, Jordanian soccer player at the 1985 and 1988 Arab Cup

== Sharaa family ==
- Hazem al-Sharaa (born 1975), Syrian lawyer and politician
- Hussein al-Sharaa (born 1946), Syrian economist and Arab nationalist activist
- Maher al-Sharaa (born 1973), Syrian politician and medical doctor

== See also ==
- Sharaa, an alternate spelling of sharia, the religious law of Islam
