= General Organization of Remote Sensing =

Syrian space research agency

General Organization of Remote Sensing (GORS)
- الهيئة العامة للإستشعار عن بعد

Agency overview
- Formed: February 1986; 40 years ago
- Jurisdiction: Government of Syria
- Headquarters: Damascus, Syria
- Agency executive: Iyad Mohammad al-Khatib, Ministry of Communications and Technology (Syria)
- Website: gors.sy

General Organization of Remote Sensing (Arabic: الهيئة العامة للإستشعار عن بعد; GORS) is a Syrian space research agency established in 1986. Headquartered in Damascus, GORS is responsible for carrying out aerospace and land surveying using remote sensing techniques. In 2018, the agency assisted the Food and Agriculture Organization of the United Nations in assessing the impacts of its irrigation projects on the production of crops such as wheat and barley in Syria.

== Notable projects ==
=== Geodynamic ===
This research aims to study the active geodynamics in Syria through tectonic and geological seismic studies, satellite image data, GIS and GPS auxiliary systems, and geophysical measurements to study the impact of the movement of active faults in Syria, and evaluate volcanic and seismic effects. This project was implemented through:

- Interpretation of satellite images in the field of tectonic studies.
- Conducting geological studies and field work on many tectonic activity faults.
- Conducting studies and measurements in archaeological areas near fault chains.
- Conducting geological studies in volcanic areas.
- Conducting seismic, geophysical, electrical and radar measurements of some active faults.
- Performing geodetic measurements using GPS stations on faults of tectonic activity.
- Geodynamic mapping of Syria
- Developing the geodynamic model for the western regions of Syria
- Preparing the seismic geodynamic map of the region and preliminary estimation of seismic activity.
- Develop plans of equal intensity for seismic lines in Syria.

Participating bodies: Working Group of the Russian Academy of Sciences.

=== Study of tectonic and structural evolution ===
And their relationship to the volcanic incursion into the Bsharri region. This project also aimed to:

- Add a basis for understanding the structure of the study area.
- Understanding the type and proportion of movement over time and space.
- Study the relationship between tectonic movement and volcanic activity in the study area.
- Study the possibility of linking project results with studies of earthquakes, new tectonics, and active faults in this region.
- Project studied the neo-tectonics of Bsharri by linking it to the tectonic evolution and internal structure of Bsharri, using many available technologies such as remote sensing techniques, image processing techniques, satellite data analysis, and horizontal and vertical structural geomorphological analysis techniques.
- As well as analyzing and processing geophysical data (gravity and magnetic) and then verifying the results using geological and tectonic maps and field surveys of the area under investigation.

== See also ==
- Syrian Space Agency
