= Fayssal Abbas =

Syrian Minister of Transport (2011–12)

Faisal Abbas
- فيصل عباس

Minister of Transport
- In office 14 April 2011 – 23 June 2012
- President: Bashar al-Assad
- Prime Minister: Adel Safar
- Preceded by: Yaarub Bader
- Succeeded by: Mahmoud Ibrahim Said

Personal details
- Born: 1955 Hama Governorate, Syria
- Died: 30 November 2022 (aged 66–67) Hama, Syria
- Children: 2
- Education: University of Damascus, Ohio State University

Dr. Faisal Abbas (Arabic: فيصل عباس) was a former Minister of Transport of Syria, serving from 2011 to 2012. He died on 30 November 2022 in Hama.

== Early life, education and career ==
Abbas was born in Hama Governorate in 1955. He earned a bachelor's degree in electrical engineering from the University of Damascus in 1977, a master's degree in electrical engineering from Ohio State University in 1982, and a Ph.D. in computer engineering from the same university in 1986.

Abbas was a professor in the Department of Computer Engineering and Automation at the Faculty of Mechanical and Electrical Engineering at the University of Damascus until 2001. From 2000 to 2007 he was the Dean of the electrical engineering faculty (department) of the University of Damascus. In 2007 he was appointed Rector (President) of the International University for Science and Technology.

- National Director of the project to establish a network of Higher Education and Scientific Research from 1998 to 2000
- Visiting professor and researcher in the Department of Electrical and Computer Engineering at the University of Detroit in Michigan in 1999
- Member of the Board of Directors of Syrian Computer Society - Secretary 2000–2005
- Member of the National Centre for Energy Research from 2004 to 2009
- Member of the Committee on Quality Assurance in Higher Education in 2008
- Member of the Board of Higher Education 2008–2009
- Director of the Directorate of Computer and Information Technology in the Ministry of Higher Education

== Personal life ==
Abbas was married and has two sons.

== See also ==
- Cabinet of Syria
