= IUST =

IUST may refer to:

- International University for Science and Technology
- Iran University of Science and Technology
- Islamic University of Science and Technology, Awantipora
