= Syrian General Organization of Books =

Syrian quasi-governmental cultural organization

Syrian General Organization of Books الهيئة العامة السورية للكتاب
- Formation: February 19, 2006; 20 years ago
- Headquarters: Damascus, Syria
- Minister of Culture: Lubanah Mshaweh
- General Director: Nayef Al-Yasin
- Affiliations: Ministry of Culture
- Website: syrbook.gov.sy

Syrian General Organization of Books (Arabic: الهيئة العامة السورية للكتاب) is a Syrian organization based in Damascus and affiliated with the Ministry of Culture, and it was founded by law on 19 February 2006 in Damascus. The organization functions as a Publishing house and aims to "contribute in improving the intellectual and cultural movements" in Syria and to "introduce the Syrian Arab society with local and Arab intellectual, cultural and literary movements and trends, and to develop intellectual, national, and humanitarian perceptions and rationality in thinking".
