= Amr Salem =

Syrian politician

HE Amr Nazir Salem عمرو نذير سالم

Minister of Internal Trade and Consumer Protection
- In office 10 August 2021 – 29 March 2023
- President: Bashar al-Assad
- Prime Minister: Hussein Arnous
- Preceded by: Talal Al-Barazi
- Succeeded by: Mohsen Abdul Karim Ali

Minister of Communications and Technology
- In office 21 February 2006 – 8 December 2007
- President: Bashar al-Assad
- Prime Minister: Muhammad Naji al-Otari
- Preceded by: Mohammad Bashir al-Monjed
- Succeeded by: Emad Abdul-Ghani Sabouni

Personal details
- Born: 1958 (age 67–68) Damascus, Damascus Governorate, Syria
- Education: Damascus University (PhD)
- Profession: Politician, Civil servant

Amr Nazir Salem (Arabic: عمرو نذير سالم) (born 1958) is a Syrian politician. He was Internal Trade and Consumer Protection Minister in the Second Hussein Arnous government.

== Life and career ==
He was born in Damascus in 1958. He had a PhD in Informatics with management.

- 1989-1998: participated in the establishment of the Syrian Scientific Informatics Society and was elected in its board of directors
- 2005: advisor to he Presidency of the Republic
- 2006-2007: Minister of Communications and Technology

When he was appointed in 2021, he was sanctioned by the European Union.

== See also ==
- Second Hussein Arnous government
- Cabinet of Syria
