= Zouhair Khazim =

Syrian politician

His Excellency Zouhair Khazim
- زهير خزيم

Minister of Transport
- In office 30 August 2020 – 8 December 2024
- President: Bashar al-Assad
- Prime Minister: Hussein Arnous; Mohammad Ghazi al-Jalali
- Preceded by: Ali Hammoud
- Succeeded by: Bahaa Aldeen Shurm

Personal details
- Born: 1960 (age 65–66) Latakia, Latakia Governorate, UAR
- Children: 3
- Education: Damascus University
- Profession: Politician, Civil servant

Zouhair Khazim (Arabic: زهير خزيم; born 1960) is a Syrian politician who served as Minister of Transport in 2020 until 2024.

== Career ==
Born in Latakia, holds a diploma in civil engineering from the Soviet Union, worked as an implementation and supervision engineer in the General Establishment for Drinking Water and Sanitation in Latakia.

In 1996, he held the position of branch manager, later central manager in the General Company for Land Reclamation in Aleppo and Assistant Director General of the Military Housing Establishment. He became a Director of Branch 7 Construction in 2008. He was the Director General of the Military Housing Establishment from 2017 until his appointment as Minister of Transport on 30 August 2020.

== Personal life ==
He is married and has three children.

== See also ==
- First Hussein Arnous government
- Second Hussein Arnous government
- Mohammad Ghazi al-Jalali government
