= Bahaa Aldeen Shurm =

Syrian politician

- بهاء الدين شرم

Minister for Transport
- In office December 2024 – 29 March 2025
- President: Ahmed al-Sharaa (Note: As de facto leader until 29 January 2025.)
- Prime Minister: Mohammed al-Bashir
- Preceded by: Zouhair Khazim
- Succeeded by: Yarub Badr

Bahaa Aldeen Shurm (Arabic: بهاء الدين شرم) is a Syrian politician who served as the Minister for Transport in the Syrian caretaker government from December 2024 until March 2025.
