= Syrian Telecom =

Syrian telecommunications company

- Industry: Telecommunications
- Headquarters: Damascus, Syria
- Number of locations: Fayez Mansour Street, Mazza Area 35108, Damascus
- Key people: Kamal Alfahel (CEO)
- Products: Fixed-line telephony
- Parent: Ministry of Communications and Information Technology
- Website: www.syriantelecom.com.sy

Syrian Telecom, officially Syrian Telecommunications Establishment (Arabic: الإتصالات السورية, romanized: al-Ittiṣālāt al-Sūriyyah, lit. 'Syrian Communications'), is a telecommunications company in Syria. The company is affiliated with the government of Syria. The twelve service providers in Syria run through two AS's, both of which are owned by Syrian Telecom (AS29256 and AS29386).

Their partners include ST-Samsung of Korea, a technology solutions provider to Syria, Iraq, and Sudan. Since 2006, agreements for wireless systems such as the INTRACOM IAS-W have been acquired through international agreements with foreign hardware suppliers.

== History ==
The Syrian Telecommunications Establishment (STE) was established on July 10, 1975, by the Decree No. 1935, as the country's main public telecommunications operator and a government body under the Ministry of Telecommunications and Technology, tasked with managing the country's public switched telephone network and related infrastructure. As a state-owned entity, STE held a monopoly on fixed-line telephony, international calls, and telex services, reflecting Syria's centralized economic model under Ba'athist rule, which prioritized state control over utilities.
