= Mohammad Yasser Ghazal =

Syrian official

- محمد ياسر غزال

President of Damascus City Council
- Incumbent
- Assumed office 10 December 2024

Acting Governor of Damascus
- In office 10 December 2024 – 15 December 2024
- Preceded by: Mohammad Tareq Kreishati
- Succeeded by: Maher Marwan

Personal details
- Born: 1988 (age 37–38)
- Occupation: Civil engineer, public official

Mohammad Yasser Ghazal (Arabic: محمد ياسر غزال, romanized: Muḥammad Yāsir Ghazāl; born 1988) is a Syrian civil engineer and public official, who currently serves as the incumbent president of the Damascus City Council and deputy minister of Local Administration. He previously served from 10-to-15 December 2024 as acting governor of Damascus, before being succeeded by Maher Marwan. He is known for his role in the transitional administration of Damascus, following its capture by opposition forces and fall of the Assad regime during the Syrian civil war. Ghazal has been tasked with restructuring governance in the capital as part of efforts by the Syrian transitional government to unify what was opposition-held territories with Damascus.

== Early life and career ==
Ghazal grew up in the United Arab Emirates. He had pursued a career in civil engineering. He worked in Saudi Arabia until 2014, when he relocated to Idlib amidst the escalation of the Syrian civil war. In 2018, he played a role in founding the Syrian Salvation Government, a governing body which operated in the HTS-controlled part of the ares held by opposition forces in Syria.

== Role in Damascus governance ==
In 2024, following the fall of the Ba'athist regime in Damascus, Ghazal was appointed head of the city council, effectively becoming the capital's chief administrator. He has focused on dismantling the centralized and corrupt structures of the former regime while modernizing the city’s governance systems.

=== Administrative reforms ===
Ghazal's initial efforts included a comprehensive review of Damascus's bureaucratic institutions. He convened department heads to clarify their roles and mandates, revealing severe inefficiencies and outdated practices. For example, the "Public Relations Department" described its duties as managing flags for official ceremonies, prompting Ghazal to question the utility of such roles.

He described the Assad regime's administration as characterized by systemic corruption, with "ghost jobs" and widespread bribery. Ghazal attributed these issues to decades of authoritarian governance and economic mismanagement, noting that government employees were earning as little as $25 per month.

=== Digital transformation ===
Drawing on his experience in Idlib, where government services were digitized, Ghazal has prioritized modernizing Damascus's administrative systems. He contrasted the slow and corrupt processes of the former regime with the efficiency of digital governance, such as issuing identity documents in minutes rather than months.

=== Challenges ===
Ghazal's efforts to reform Damascus faced significant obstacles, including the legacy of decades-long centralized rule under the Assad regime and the precarious economic situation in Syria. Furthermore, the association of the Salvation Government with HTS, a group classified as a terrorist organization by the United Nations, United States, and others, complicated efforts to secure international legitimacy.
