= Hussein al-Masri =

Syrian politician

- حسين المصري

Minister of Communications and Information Technology
- In office December 2024 – 29 March 2025
- President: Ahmed al-Sharaa
- Prime Minister: Mohammed al-Bashir
- De facto leader: Ahmed al-Sharaa (Note: As de facto leader until 29 January 2025.)
- Preceded by: Iyad al-Khatib
- Succeeded by: Abdul Salam Heikal

Hussein al-Masri (Note: Arabic: حسين المصري) is a Syrian politician who served as the Minister of Communications and Information Technology in the Syrian caretaker government that was formed under prime minister Mohammed al-Bashir in the aftermath of the fall of the Assad regime from December 2024 to 29 March 2025.
