= 2024 Syrian parliamentary election =

- 15 July 2024

All 250 seats in the People's Assembly 126 seats needed for a majority
- Registered: 19,200,325
- Turnout: 7,326,844; 38.16% (▲4.99 pp)
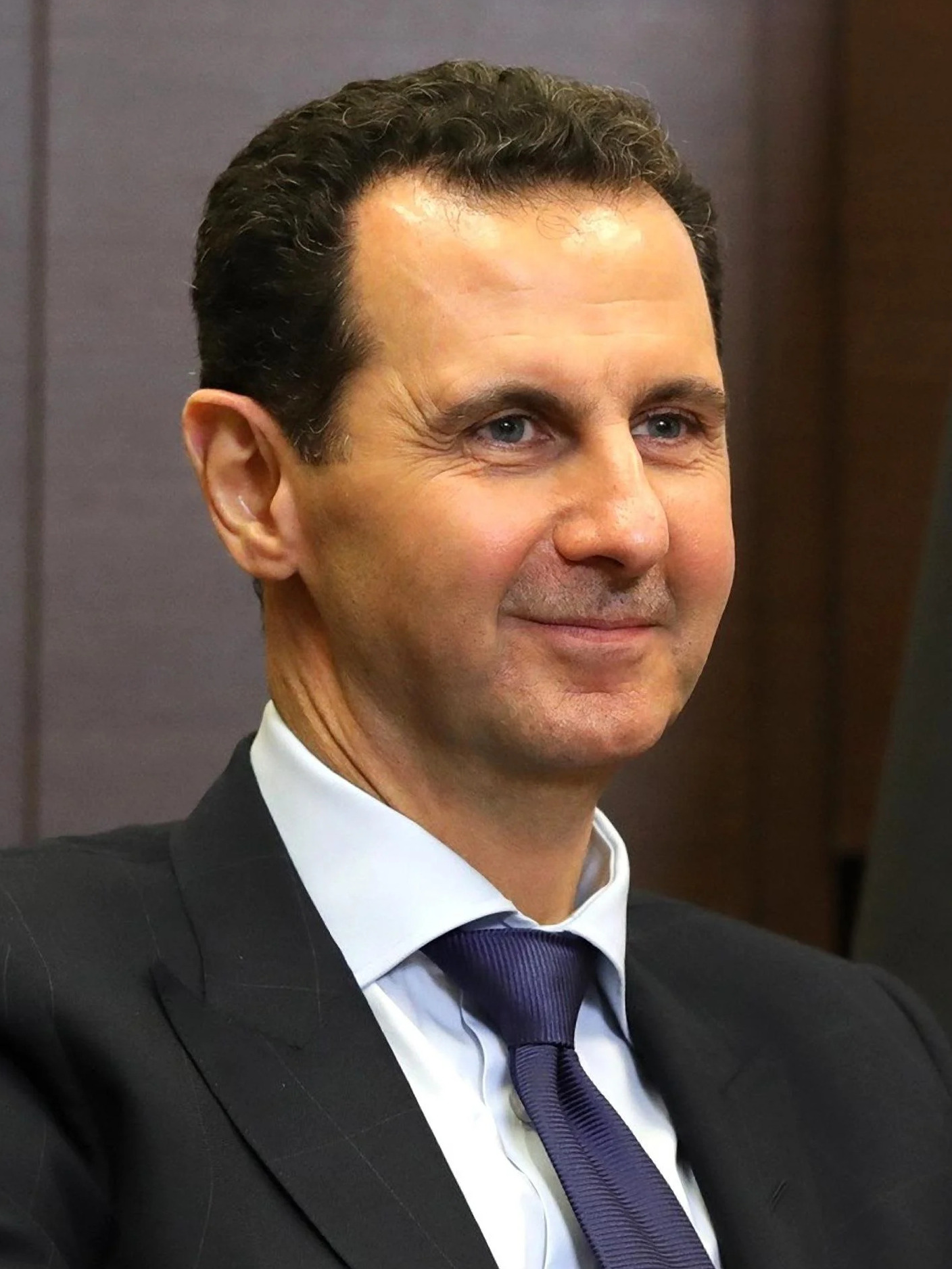
	First party	Second party
		Ind
Leader	Bashar al-Assad
Party	Ba'ath Party	Independent
Alliance	NPF
Last election	183	67
Seats won	185	65
Seat change	▲2	▼2
- Seat distribution by party
Speaker before election
Hammouda Sabbagh
Ba'ath Party
Elected Speaker
Hammouda Sabbagh
Ba'ath Party

Parliamentary elections were held in Syria on 15 July 2024. The date was set by a decree issued by President Bashar al-Assad on 11 May 2024. 250 members were elected to serve a four-year term in the People's Assembly, for a term legally ending in 2028. Under the Ba'ath party, Syria's parliamentary elections occurred every four years, with the previous election held in 2020.

These were the last elections to be held in Ba'athist Syria, prior to its overthrow following the 2024 Syrian opposition offensive.

== Background ==
The 250-member People's Assembly was little more than a rubber stamp for the ruling Ba'ath party from when it came to power in a 1963 coup. Two-thirds of the seats in the assembly were reserved for the Ba'athists and their allies in the National Progressive Front, meaning it was impossible for the Ba'athists to lose an election. However, from the start of the Syrian Civil War in 2011, elections to the Assembly were being seen as a "barometer of influence among the ruling elite", namely due to the rise in non-Alawite members that represented various new groups and militias which helped prop-up the Ba'athist regime. As such, Assad instructed the security apparatus of Syria not to intervene in Ba'athist primaries, to inject new "flavor" to revitalize the party.

The government also granted reforms as part of a rehabilitation effort with rebels that surrendered in Daraa, which the newly elected assembly was planning to draft. In 2018, rebels in Daraa agreed to surrender following a government offensive. However, anti-government sentiment remained strong in the region as protestors in Suwayda called for a boycott of the elections.

Among the pressing issues of the election was the government's poor handling of the COVID-19 pandemic, and the flight or fatigue of the country's doctors. Additionally, the Syrian pound reached new lows against the US dollar, resulting in food and fuel inflation. The government also cancelled subsidies while doubling public sector and pension wages. Assad, meanwhile, focused on parliament being a "national dialogue" for domestic issues to be resolved, and repairing relations with Turkey in order for the latter to withdraw from their occupied territories.

== Electoral system ==
The 250 seats of the People's Assembly of Syria were elected through party block voting in 15 multi-member constituencies. Voters in a riding chose a list of candidates, and the one with the most votes won all the seats at stake in the riding. Each list was made up of a minimum of two-thirds of Ba'ath Party candidates and half of workers and peasants, so that the total of the latter is 127 out of the total of 250 elected deputies.

Candidate submissions were accepted between 20 and 26 May. On 29 May the Supreme Judicial Committee for Elections announced that 11,897 people had applied to run for the People's Assembly, of whom 9,194 were approved to run. Candidates were allowed to contest seats in rebel-held areas, although only voters living in government-held areas were allowed to vote. The number of candidates who were finally listed in ballot papers for the 250 seats was reduced to 1,516, while the government set up 8,151 polling stations for the election. The Ba'ath party and its allies fielded 185 candidates.

Voting was not held in rebel-occupied northwest Syria, alongside the ambiguously contended northeast region. Additionally, Syrians abroad were not allowed to participate in the election.

== Conduct ==
Polling stations opened at 07:00, and were supposed to close at 21:00 but were extended by two hours by the Higher Judicial Committee. The stated size of the eligible electorate was criticized by the Atlantic Council due to a lack of maintenance of civil registry adult records.

== Incidents ==
Several polling stations were attacked by demonstrators who also destroyed ballot boxes while chanting anti-Assad slogans in As-Suwayda Governorate. One protester was injured after being shot by security forces.

Elections in several polling stations in the governorates of Aleppo, Latakia, Hama and Daraa were cancelled and had to be repeated due to violations relating to some voters voting more than once.

== Results ==
The results were published on 18 July, with the nationwide turnout for the election at 38.16%. A total of 7,326,844 voters participated out of an eligible 19,200,325.

The Ba'ath party won 169 seats, while its allies won 16 (three for the Syrian Social Nationalist Party, two for the Syrian Communist Party (Unified), two for the Syrian Communist Party (Bakdash), two for the National Covenant Party, two for the Arab Democratic Union Party, two for the Socialist Unionist Party, two for the Arab Socialist Union Party, and one for the Democratic Socialist Unionist Party). The remaining 65 seats were won by independents.

Party or alliance		Votes	%	Seats	+/–
National Progressive Front	Ba'ath Party			169	+2
National Progressive Front	Syrian Social Nationalist Party			3	0
National Progressive Front	Arab Socialist Union Party			2	–1
National Progressive Front	Syrian Communist Party (Bakdash)			2	–1
National Progressive Front	National Covenant Party			2	0
National Progressive Front	Socialist Unionist Party			2	0
National Progressive Front	Arab Democratic Union Party			2	+1
National Progressive Front	Syrian Communist Party (Unified)			2	+1
National Progressive Front	Democratic Socialist Unionist Party			1	0
Independents				65	−2
Total				250	–
Total votes		7,326,844	–		
Registered voters/turnout		19,200,325	38.16		

== Aftermath ==
Following the election, President Assad issued a decree appointing former Communications Minister Mohammad Ghazi al-Jalali as Prime Minister of Syria on 14 September. On 23 September 2024, a new Mohammad Ghazi al-Jalali government was formed.

After the Fall of the Assad regime on 8 December 2024 following the 2024 Syrian opposition offensives, the new Syrian caretaker government suspended the People's Assembly on 12 December 2024. It was formally dissolved on 29 January 2025 at the Syrian Revolution Victory Conference.

== Reactions ==
Overseas opposition groups in exile described the election as "absurd", saying that it only represented "the ruling authority". The Kurdish National Council stated that they consider the election illegitimate, saying that the "Syrian regime continues to exert its authority by force through these elections, disregarding UN resolutions aimed at resolving the civil war and political issues in Syria".

The German ambassador to Syria stated that Germany did not support holding elections in Syria at the moment, explaining that free and fair elections are an integral part of resolving the conflict and establishing peace in Syria, but the conditions were not yet ready and that holding the election at this time would entrench the status quo of conflict and division. Germany also reiterated its support of the full implementation of United Nations Security Council Resolution 2254.
