= Diala Barakat =

Syrian politician (born 1980)

Her Excellency Diala Barakat
- ديالا بركات

Minister of Culture
- In office 23 September 2024 – 10 December 2024
- President: Bashar al-Assad; Vacant
- Prime Minister: Mohammad Ghazi al-Jalali
- Preceded by: Lubanah Mshaweh
- Succeeded by: Mohammed Yassin Saleh (Note: Vacant from 10 December 2024 until 29 March 2025)

Minister of State for Southern Development Affairs
- In office 10 August 2021 – 23 September 2024
- President: Bashar al-Assad
- Prime Minister: Hussein Arnous
- Preceded by: Mohammad Samir Haddad
- Succeeded by: Ahmad Hadla

Personal details
- Born: 1980 (age 45–46) Homs, Homs Governorate, Syria
- Party: Syrian Social Nationalist Party
- Education: Roma Tre University, University of Damascus
- Occupation: Doctor of Classical antiquities
- Profession: Politician, professor

Diala Barakat (Arabic: ديالا بركات; born 1980) is a former member of the cabinet of Syria. She assumed leadership of the ministry of culture in September 2024 until the fall of the Assad regime. She was the member of the Second Hussein Arnous government as Minister of State for Southern Development Affairs.

== Career ==
She worked as assistant head of the Department of Antiquities of Homs, head of the Excavation Division in the Department of Antiquities of Homs, a teacher at Al-Baath University, Faculty of Tourism, Open Education and Postgraduate Studies, and chairman of the Inventory Committee of the National Museum of Palmyra.

She participated in archaeological work, excavation and documentation with several foreign and national missions since 2001 and in documenting the damage to the Palmyra Museum as part of a team Directorate-General of Antiquities and Museums in 2016.
