= Riyad Naasan Agha =

Syrian politician and diplomat (1947–2025)

- رياض نعسان آغا
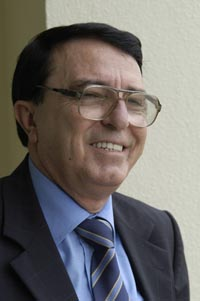
- Agha in 2004

Minister of Culture
- In office 21 February 2006 – 3 October 2010
- President: Bashar al-Assad
- Prime Minister: Muhammad Naji al-Otari
- Preceded by: Mahmoud al-Sayyed
- Succeeded by: Riad Ismat

Personal details
- Born: 1947 Idlib, Syria
- Died: 14 December 2025 (aged 78) United Arab Emirates

Riyad Naasan Agha (Arabic: رياض نعسان آغا; 1947 – 14 December 2025) was a Syrian politician. He served as minister of culture of Syria from 21 February 2006 to 3 October 2010, and also as the country's Ambassador to Oman and the United Arab Emirates. Agha held a PhD. degree in philosophy from the University of Damascus.

Agha died on 14 December 2025, at the age of 78.
