= Iyad al-Khatib =

Syrian politician

His Excellency Iyad Mohammad al-Khatib
- إياد محمد الخطيب

Minister of Communications and Technology
- In office 26 November 2018 – 10 December 2024
- President: Bashar al-Assad
- Prime Minister: Imad Khamis; Hussein Arnous; Mohammad Ghazi al-Jalali
- Preceded by: Ali al-Dhafir
- Succeeded by: Hussein al-Masri

Personal details
- Born: 1974 (age 51–52) Damascus, Damascus Governorate, Syria
- Education: Damascus University
- Profession: Politician, Civil servant

Iyad Mohammad al-Khatib (Arabic: إياد محمد الخطيب; born 1974) is a Syrian politician who served as Communications and Technology Minister from 26 November 2018 to 10 December 2024.

== Career ==
He held numerous administrative positions, including director of Damascus Communications Branch, head of Technical Department at the Syrian Telecommunications Establishment, and executive managing director of the Syrian Telecom.

In 2018, he was sanctioned by the European Union.

== See also ==
- Second Hussein Arnous government
