= Emad Sabouni =

Syrian politician (born 1964)

Emad Sabouni عماد الصابوني
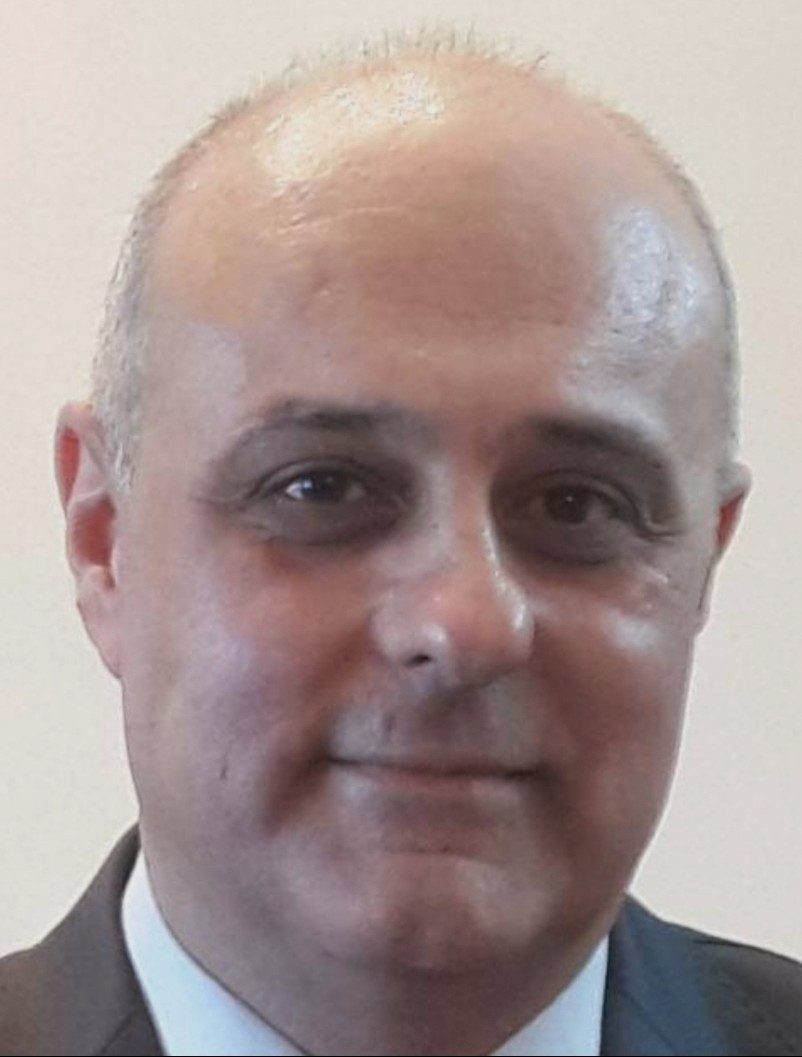

Minister of Communications and Technology
- In office 8 December 2007 – 27 August 2014
- Prime Minister: Mohammad Najji Outri; Adel Safar; Riyad Farid Hijab; Omar Ibrahim Ghalawanji; Wael Nader al-Halqi
- Preceded by: Amr Nazir Salem
- Succeeded by: Mohammad Ghazi al-Jalali

Personal details
- Born: 1964 (age 61–62) Damascus, Syria
- Children: two
- Education: National Polytechnic Institute of Grenoble (Ph.D.), Engineering from Ecole Nationale Superieure des Télécommunications Bretagne (Télécom Bretagne)

Emad Abdul-Ghani Sabouni (Arabic: عماد عبد الغني الصابوني) (born 1964 in Damascus) is the former Minister of Communications and Technology of Syria.

== Early life, education and career ==
Sabouni was born in Damascus in 1964. He earned a Ph.D. degree from National Polytechnic Institute of Grenoble, France. He also earned a degree in engineering from Ecole Nationale Superieure des Télécommunications (Télécom Bretagne) in Brest, France.

- Director General of the Syrian Telecommunications Establishment, 2003–2006.
- Chairman of the Syrian Computer Society.
- Advisor to Minister of Communications and Technology.
- Participated in composing the dictionary of Computer Terms published by the Syrian Computer Society.
- Member of the Technical Committee on Using the Arabic Language in Information Technology's Syrian Secretariat.
- Participated in work teams at the Arab League, the International Telecommunication Union and the United Nations Economic and Social Commission for Western Asia (UN-ESCWA).

== Personal life ==
Sabouni is married and has two daughters.

== See also ==
- Cabinet of Syria
