= Lubanah Mshaweh =

Syrian politician

Her Excellency Lubanah Mshaweh
- لبانة مشوح

Minister of Culture
- In office 30 August 2020 – 23 September 2024
- President: Bashar al-Assad
- Prime Minister: Hussein Arnous
- Preceded by: Muhammad al-Ahmad
- Succeeded by: Diala Barakat
- In office 23 June 2012 – 27 August 2014
- President: Bashar al-Assad
- Prime Minister: Riyad Farid Hijab; Omar Ibrahim Ghalawanji; Wael Nader al-Halqi
- Preceded by: Riad Ismat
- Succeeded by: Issam Khalil

Personal details
- Born: December 1955 (age 70) Damascus, Damascus Governorate, Second Syrian Republic
- Children: 2
- Education: Damascus University; Paris 8 University (PhD)
- Profession: Politician, University Professor

Dr. Lubanah Mshaweh (Arabic: لبانة مشوح) (born December 1955) is a former minister of culture of Syria. She holds a PhD in linguistics from Paris 8 University.

Mshaweh was included in the list of sanctioned individuals, during the Syrian Civil War, by the European Union, as she "shares responsibility for the regime's violent repression against the civilian population."

She resumed her role as Minister of Culture in 2020 for the Hussein Arnous government, and then for his second cabinet.

== See also ==
- Syrian Ministry of Culture
- Cabinet of Syria
