= Riad Ismat =

Syrian diplomat (1947–2020)

Riad Ismat رياض عصمت
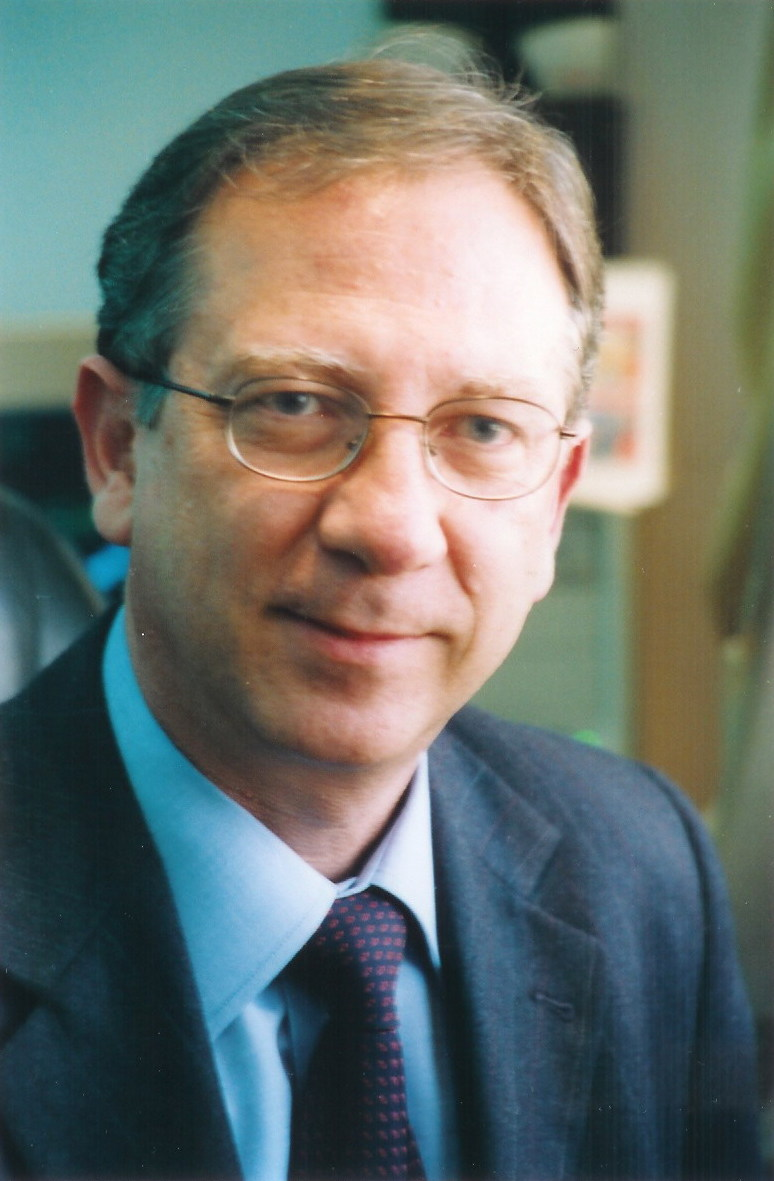
- Riad Ismat in 2009

Minister of Culture
- In office 3 October 2010 – 23 June 2012
- President: Bashar al-Assad
- Prime Minister: Muhammad Naji al-Otari; Adel Safar
- Preceded by: Riyad Naasan Agha
- Succeeded by: Lubanah Mshaweh

Personal details
- Born: 11 July 1947 Damascus, Syria
- Died: 13 May 2020 (aged 72) Evanston, Illinois, United States
- Cause of death: COVID-19
- Spouse: Azzah Konbaz
- Children: 3
- Education: Damascus University, University College, Cardiff
- Profession: Dramatist, critic, director, diplomat

Mohammad Riad Hussain Ismat (Arabic: رياض عصمت) (11 July 1947 – 13 May 2020) was a Syrian writer, critic and theatre director. He served as Minister of Culture of Syria from 3 October 2010 to 23 June 2012.

== Early life, education and career ==
Ismat studied English literature at the Damascus University and graduated in 1968. In 2000, he became director of the Higher Institute of Dramatic Arts, after years of teaching at the same institution.

In 2003, Ismat became Director General of Syrian State Radio and Television, then held the post of Syrian Vice-Minister of Culture. In 2005, he was appointed Ambassador to Pakistan and, in 2010, Syrian Ambassador to Qatar. In October 2010, he was appointed Minister of Culture, serving in that post until 23 June 2012. From 2013 to 2014, he was a Buffett Center Visiting Scholar at Concordia University in River Forest, Illinois.

== Theatre ==
Ismat directed more than 15 theatrical productions, including interpretations of Shakespeare, Tennessee Williams and Frank Wedekind, as well as producing his own personal vision of The Arabian Nights. He founded the first mime troupe in Syria and taught mime, acting and directing at the Higher Institute of Dramatic Arts in Damascus. There, he taught the Stanislavsky-based method of acting.

His breakthrough as a playwright came with The Game of Love & Revolution. Among his best known dramatic works are Was Dinner Good, dear Sister; Mourning becomes Antigone; Sindbad; Shahryar's Nights; Abla & Antar; Mata Hari; The Banana Republic and In Search of Zenobia.

== Publications ==
Ismat published 35 books, including short stories and several books on Arab and World drama. He also wrote a book on the Nobel Prize laureate Naguib Mahfouz and a book on cinema. As a television script writer, he wrote the scripts for seven television serials and directed his own television trilogy for Syrian TV, The Artist & Love, 1985.

== Death ==
Ismat died from COVID-19 in Evanston, Illinois, on 13 May 2020, at age 72, during the COVID-19 pandemic in Illinois.

== See also ==
- Cabinet of Syria
- Syrian literature
