= Yarub Badr =

Syrian politician

- يعرب بدر

Minister of Transport
- Incumbent
- Assumed office 29 March 2025
- President: Ahmed al-Sharaa
- Preceded by: Bahaa Aldeen Shurm
- In office 21 February 2006 – 29 March 2011
- President: Bashar al-Assad
- Prime Minister: Mohammad Najji Outri
- Preceded by: Makram Obeid
- Succeeded by: Faisal Abbas

Personal details
- Born: 1959 (age 66–67) Latakia, Syria
- Party: Independent; Arab Socialist Ba'ath Party – Syria Region (formerly)
- Education: École nationale des ponts et chaussées
- Profession: Professor

Yarub Suleiman Badr (Arabic: يعرب سليمان بدر; born 1959) is a Syrian politician who is currently serving as Minister of Transport in the Syrian transitional government. He was previously a professor of civil engineering at Latakia University. He holds a PhD from the École nationale des ponts et chaussées in Paris, France. He is an Alawite.

Before, Bader had served as Minister of Transport from 12 February 2006 to 14 April 2011.

In August 2026, Badr agreed with Lebanese Public Works and Transport Minister Fayez Rasamny on a joint plan to develop transport and railway links between the two countries, including the formation of a joint technical team to oversee the project.

== See also ==
- Cabinet of Syria
