= Maher Marwan =

Syrian official

- ماهر مروان
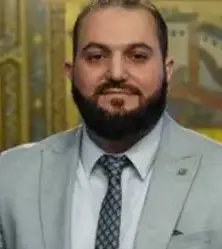
- Marwan in 2026

Governor of Damascus
- Incumbent
- Assumed office 15 December 2024
- President: Ahmed al-Sharaa
- Preceded by: Mohammad Yasser Ghazal (Acting)

Personal details
- Born: Damascus, Syria
- Relatives: Sharaa family
- Education: Bachelor's degree in Islamic Sharia

Maher Marwan Idlibi (Arabic: ماهر مروان إدلبي) is the current Governor of Damascus, appointed on 15 December 2024 following the fall of the Assad regime. He is both a cousin and brother-in-law of Ahmed al-Sharaa, the current President of Syria.

== Early life and education ==
Maher Marwan was born in Damascus, Syria. He holds a bachelor's degree in Islamic Sharia and worked for ten years in business administration.

During the early stages of the Syrian civil war in 2011, Marwan fled to Idlib due to persecution by security forces loyal to the Assad regime. There he became a vocal critic of Assad, describing him as having "built a wall between himself and the people".

== Statements on Israel ==
In December 2024, Marwan made headlines for remarks during an interview with NPR, where he stated, "We are not afraid of Israel, nor do we want to engage in anything that threatens Israel's security or any other nation's security". He later clarified his comments, emphasizing that his focus was on internal peace in Syria, not foreign relations.

Marwan also called on the United States to convey a message to Israel, expressing a desire for peace. His comments sparked reactions from both local and international analysts, with some viewing them as indicative of a pragmatic shift in Syrian policy.

== Personal life ==
Marwan has consistently denied affiliations with extremist groups such as al-Qaeda. He expressed support for the decision by Hay'at Tahrir al-Sham to sever ties with al-Qaeda, aligning with his focus on national stability and reform.

The sister of Syrian First Lady Latifa al-Droubi is reportedly married to Marwan. He is both a cousin and brother-in-law of Ahmed al-Sharaa, the current President of Syria.

== See also ==
- Syrian caretaker government
