= First Lady of Syria =

Spouse of the incumbent president of Syria

First Lady of the Syrian Arab Republic السيدة الأولى للجمهورية العربية السورية
- Emblem of Syria
- Current; Latifa al-Droubi since 29 January 2025
- Style: Her Excellency (diplomatic)
- Residence: People's Palace
- Inaugural holder: Bahira al-Dalati (wife of Shukri al-Quwatli)
- Formation: 17 August 1943

First Lady of Syria (Arabic: السيدة الأولى للجمهورية العربية السورية, romanized: al-Sayyidah al-Ūlá lil-Jumhūrīyah al-ʻArabīyah al-Sūrīyah), officially the First Lady of the Syrian Arab Republic, is the title given to the spouse of the incumbent president of Syria.

From 1971 to 2024, two consecutive first ladies came from the same ruling family, the Assad family. The current First Lady is Latifa al-Droubi, the wife of President Ahmed al-Sharaa, who has held the role since January 2025.

== List of first ladies of Syria ==
| Name | Term begins | Term ends | President |
First Syrian Republic (1943–1949)
| Bahira al-Dalati | 17 August 1943 | 30 May 1949 | Shukri al-Quwatli |
| Nouran al-Za'im | 11 April 1949 | 14 August 1949 | Husni al-Za'im |
| none | 14 August 1949 | 15 August 1949 | Sami al-Hinnawi |
Second Syrian Republic (1949–1958)
| none | 15 August 1949 | 2 December 1951 | Hashim al-Atassi |
| none | 3 December 1951 | 11 July 1953 | Fawzi Selu |
| Fatina al-Fanari | 11 July 1953 | 25 February 1954 | Adib Shishakli |
| none | 28 February 1954 | 6 September 1955 | Hashim al-Atassi |
| Bahira al-Dalati | 6 September 1955 | 22 February 1958 | Shukri al-Quwatli |
United Arab Republic (1958–1961)
| Tahia Kazem (as First Lady of the United Arab Republic) | 22 February 1958 | 14 December 1961 | Gamal Abdel Nasser |
Second Syrian Republic (1961–1963)
| Şehire al-Kudsi | 14 December 1961 | 8 March 1963 | Nazim al-Kudsi |
Ba'athist Syria (1963–2024)
| Şehire al-Kudsi | 8 March 1963 | 8 March 1963 | Nazim al-Kudsi |
| none | 9 March 1963 | 27 July 1963 | Lu'ay al-Atassi |
| Zeinab al-Hafiz | 27 July 1963 | 23 February 1966 | Amin al-Hafiz |
| Salma al-Hasibi | 25 February 1966 | 18 November 1970 | Nureddin al-Atassi |
| Anisa Makhlouf | 12 March 1971 | 10 June 2000 | Hafez al-Assad |
| Asma al-Assad | 13 December 2000 | 8 December 2024 | Bashar al-Assad |
Syria (2024–present)
| Vacant | 8 December 2024 | 29 January 2025 | Vacant (Note: Following the fall of the Assad regime, Ahmed al-Sharaa served as Syria's de facto leader as the emir of the Hay'at Tahrir al-Sham, general commander and head of the new Syrian administration until 29 January 2025, when he was appointed President of Syria by the Syrian General Command.) |
| Latifa al-Droubi | 29 January 2025 | – | Ahmed al-Sharaa |
