= Hussein al-Sharaa =

Syrian economist, researcher, and writer (born 1946)

- حسين الشرع
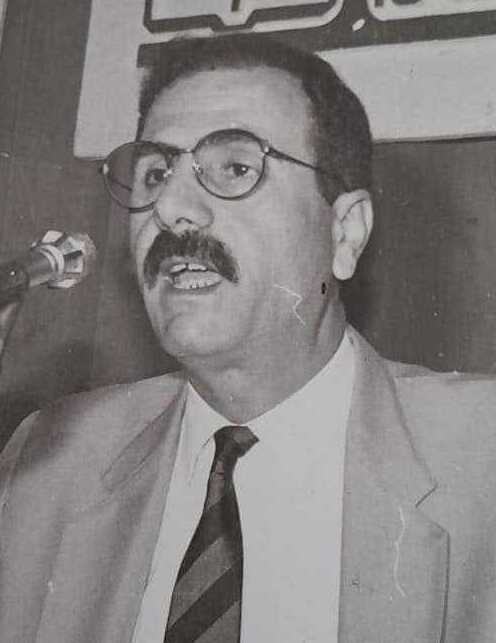
- Al-Sharaa in 1992
- Born: Hussein Ali al-Sharaa; 1946 (age 79–80); Daraa, First Syrian Republic
- Education: University of Baghdad (Ph.D)
- Occupations: Academic and economist
- Movement: Nasserism
- Spouse: Widad al-Khaled
- Children: 7, including Maher, Hazem, Ahmed, Jamal, and three daughters
- Relatives: Sharaa family

Hussein Ali al-Sharaa (Note: Arabic: حسين علي الشرع, romanized: Ḥusayn ʿAlī al-Sharaʿ) (born 1946) is a Syrian economist, researcher, and writer. He is the father of the current President of Syria, Ahmed al-Sharaa.

Born into a family in Daraa, Syrian Republic, he graduated from the University of Baghdad with a degree in economics and later earned a Ph.D. In 1961, he joined protests against the Baathists following their coup against the United Arab Republic and the Arab Socialist Ba'ath party coups in 1963. His family was displaced during the 1967 Israeli occupation. He was forced to leave Syria due to the worsening political and security situation and fled to Jordan, where he was imprisoned again. He was eventually given the choice to travel to either Saudi Arabia or Iraq, and he chose Iraq, which was then under President Abdul Salam Arif.

Al-Sharaa escaped from prison in 1971 to pursue his higher studies in Iraq. He later went to Jordan to cooperate with the Palestinian fedayeen. After returning to Syria in the 1970s, he served in the ministry of petroleum under Hafez al-Assad before eventually moving to Saudi Arabia with his family. He remained in the Syrian oil sector until 1979, when he was hired by the Saudi Ministry of Petroleum as an economic researcher. He returned to Syria in 1989 with his family and was briefly imprisoned again before serving as an advisor to the ministry of petroleum, a position he eventually left. After the Syrian civil war broke out in March 2011, al-Sharaa resettled to Egypt.

After the fall of the Assad regime, he criticized the caretaker government’s plan to privatize public institutions but later defended it, saying it had a clear vision for Syria’s future without outside influence. He also condemned Israel after an attack in Damascus and warned that Syria would not remain silent. In June 2025, al-Sharaa said that Benjamin Netanyahu underestimated Iran’s strength and referred to the destruction in occupied Palestinian cities.

== Early life and education ==
Hussein Ali al-Sharaa was born in 1946 in Daraa. His father, Ali al-Sharaa, was born in Fiq, Golan Heights, and was a landowner who owned most of Fiq. Hussein al-Sharaa’s grandfather, Muhammad ibn Khalid al-Sharaa, was a key participant in the Zoya Revolution against French rule. His uncle, Talib Abdul Majeed al-Sharaa, was one of the most prominent leaders of the Zawiya Revolution. Both were involved in resistance against French colonialism and were sentenced to death in absentia; however, the sentences were not carried out.

He studied in the Kuttab during his childhood and learned arithmetic operations. Ahmed al-Sharaa told PBS in a 2021 interview that his father was influenced by Gamal Abdel Nasser, embraced Arab nationalism, and studied political science with a specialization in oil. He graduated with a degree in economics from the University of Baghdad, where he later earned his Ph.D.

In a September 2025 interview with Syrian journalist Anas Azraq, al-Sharaa said that he first earned a degree in law before pursuing postgraduate studies in international relations. He also mentioned that he was active in debates and participated in political movements that advocated for reform and justice.

== Later years ==
=== Rebellion and Imprisonment ===
In 1961, he joined protests against the Baathists after their coup against the United Arab Republic, and he later joined demonstrations against the Arab Socialist Ba'ath party coups in 1963. The government soldiers attempted to assassinate al-Sharaa but accidentally shot and killed a girl. He took shelter in a roadside house before managing to flee to the southern part of Fiq, Syria, where he rejoined his colleagues. He and his colleagues joined anti-separatist protests and organized a movement against the “separatist government” in their region. They carried out demonstrations on every possible occasion, such as Arbor Day, the anniversary of the Balfour Declaration, and the day commemorating the partition of Palestine, which made him a target for the authorities who responded with gunfire.

After returning to school with his classmates, al-Sharaa was threatened by the principal with severe punishment. He left his classmates, confronted the principal, and urged the other students to suspend classes. Al-Sharaa and other student leaders were arrested and detained in underground military barracks before being moved to Mezzeh prison in Damascus. Local leaders and tribesmen confronted the army and demanded their release. After being freed and warned against further protests, al-Sharaa was forced to leave Syria due to the worsening political and security situation and fled to Jordan, where he was imprisoned again. In the 1960s, disagreements between Jordan and Gamal Abdel Nasser prevented an agreement for his release from prison. He was given the choice to travel to either Saudi Arabia or Iraq, and he chose Iraq, which was then led by President Abdul Salam Arif. Then he was influenced by Nasserist thought during the rise of Arab socialist nationalism in the 1960s and by the successive coups sponsored by the Ba'ath Party in Iraq and Syria. The family were displaced in 1967 after the Israeli occupation during the Six-Day War.

Al-Sharaa escaped from prison in 1971 to complete his higher studies in Iraq. During this time, he traveled to Jordan to co-operate with the Palestinian fedayeen. After returning to Syria in the 1970s, which coincided with the Corrective Revolution led by Hafez al-Assad, he became more committed to unity and opposed to partition. While working in the ministry of petroleum under Assad's rule, he ran for a seat in the Quneitra Provincial Council and won. During this period, he also attempted to secure a seat in the People's Assembly in 1973 but was unsuccessful. He later moved to Saudi Arabia with his family, where he lived from 1979 to 1988. He remained in the Syrian oil sector until 1979, when he was hired by the Saudi Ministry of Petroleum as an economic researcher, where he wrote extensively on the subject and published several books.

=== Later life and public affairs ===
He returned to Syria in 1989 with his family. After being rejected for a government position, he worked as an English teacher in Daraa and was imprisoned again before later serving as an advisor to the ministry of petroleum, a position he eventually left. He moved to the Ministry of Planning and resigned in 1999 to establish a real estate office in Mezzeh, Damascus. It is said that his family owned a shop in the upscale Mezzeh district of Damascus. After Hafez al-Assad died in 2000 and his son Bashar al-Assad succeeded him, there was a brief period known as the Damascus Spring, in which al-Sharaa was a prominent participant and one of the signatories of a document calling for elections. In 2005, he was among the signatories of the Damascus Declaration, which called for an end to Assad family's rule and a transition to a democratic system. After the Syrian civil war broke out in March 2011, al-Sharaa settled to Egypt. In March 2025, al-Sharaa was reportedly at the presidential palace in Damascus during the Eid al-Fitr prayers, where he extended his hand to his son, Ahmed al-Sharaa.

=== Political statements ===
In February 2025, al-Sharaa criticized the caretaker government’s plan to privatize public sector institutions. He condemned the initiative as a political strategy to "reshape Syria’s economic landscape," emphasizing that these institutions are "national assets built over decades." He warned against selling them to address inefficiencies, arguing that "the issue is not with the public sector itself, but with the mismanagement that has plagued it." He later defended the caretaker government, saying that they had "a clear vision and a roadmap for Syria’s future, independent of external influence."

In May 2025, al-Sharaa criticized Israel following the attack in Damascus, saying that "The Zionist enemy state threatens and attacks under the pretext of protecting Syrian Druze" and warning that "we will not remain silent. It will come to you from a place you don’t know." In June 2025, al-Sharaa commented on the Twelve-Day War, saying that "this reckless Benjamin Netanyahu thinks Iran is just Hezbollah and Hamas. He doesn’t understand that Iran is a strong state with tremendous capabilities," and added that "we’re seeing the scale of destruction in the occupied Palestinian cities."

On 21 May 2026, al-Sharaa spoke in an interview on the Al-Sharq podcast about the differences between urban and rural communities in Syria. During the interview, he said: "When I was studying in Baghdad, I found the Shawaya to be much kinder and more civilized than the monastery." He added that the monastery is characterized by noise and loud voices. He also said that the people of Abu Kamal are better than them. He spoke about the presence of a sense of superiority among some people in major cities toward rural residents, saying that the people of the Levant and Aleppo have a superior view and consider themselves to be above others. The remarks sparked widespread backlash and protests across Deir ez-Zor Governorate. Al-Sharaa issued a statement clarifying that his comments had been taken out of context. He said that he had been discussing the developmental and social disparities between urban and rural areas resulting from what he described as exclusionary policies toward rural communities, and denied intending to insult the people of Deir ez-Zor. During a call with the governor of Deir ez-Zor, Ziad al-Ayesh, Ahmed al-Sharaa apologized and said: “My father’s words hurt me before they hurt the people of the monastery... Your rights are preserved, and they can wipe them with our beard.”

Hussein al-Sharaa said in an interview on the Al-Sharq podcast that "Hafez al-Assad was very good and growth reached 7 percent," adding, "This was our rule for 30 years, and Bashar for 25 years." He pointed out that "periods of economic growth were clear" during Hafez al-Assad’s rule, but noted that "corruption, familialism, and personalization appeared and then infiltrated the system." He added that the problem was not with Hafez al-Assad and others, but rather with the imbalance of power with Israel, stressing that "the first years of Hafez al-Assad’s rule were very good." He also spoke about previous peace negotiations with Israel, saying that "President Hafez al-Assad began negotiations with the Israelis, and they almost reached an agreement," adding that the dispute revolved around "the area east of the lake," and indicating that al-Assad "refused to give it up." The interview sparked a wave of criticism, despite provisions in the 2025 Constitutional Declaration that prohibit glorification of the Assad regime.

== Personal life ==
He is the father of Ahmed, Maher, and Hazem al-Sharaa. While some reports said that Hussein al-Sharaa and Farouk al-Sharaa are related, this fact is denied by MENA Research Center. In August 2025, Hussein said on SyriaTV that the Al-Sharaa family in Daraa, to which former Syrian Vice President Farouk al-Sharaa belongs, has no direct kinship ties, but he pointed to an ancient lineage dating back to the 1930s. Hussein is married to Widad al-Khaled, who is the mother of Ahmed al-Sharaa.

== Books ==
He has published numerous books in Arabic on regional economic development, particularly focusing on natural resources and their potential contribution to education, agriculture, and military advancement. His first book was Oil and Comprehensive Development in the Arab World (1983). His second book was Economic Evaluation and the Future of Development in Saudi Arabia (1983). His third book was The Saudi Economy in the Process of Basic Infrastructure and Capacity Building (1984). His fourth book was OPEC 1960–1985: Major Transformations and Persistent Challenges (1987).
