= Abdul Salam Haykal =

Syrian politician and businessman (born 1978)

- عبد السلام هيكل

Minister of Communications and Information Technology
- Incumbent
- Assumed office 29 March 2025
- President: Ahmed al-Sharaa
- Preceded by: Hussein al-Masri

Personal details
- Born: Abdul Salam Haykal; 14 July 1978 (age 47) Damascus, Syria
- Party: Independent
- Education: American University of Beirut (BA); SOAS University of London (MA)

Abdul Salam Haykal (Arabic: عبد السلام هيكل; born 1978) is a Syrian politician and businessman who has served as Minister of Communications and Information Technology in the Syrian transitional government since 29 March 2025.

== Education ==
Haykal holds a bachelor's degree in political science from the American University of Beirut. He later earned a master's degree in international relations from the School of Oriental and African Studies (SOAS) at the University of London in the United Kingdom.

== Professional Life ==
=== Entrepreneurship ===
Abdul Salam Haykal is an entrepreneur active in the fields of media, technology, and knowledge-based services. He is the founder of several companies and initiatives that focus on Arabic-language content and digital innovation. He is the founder and executive chairman of Majarra, a knowledge platform that publishes Arabic editions of internationally recognized magazines, including Harvard Business Review, MIT Technology Review, and Popular Science. The company also operates content platforms such as Man Hom? and the Stanford Social Innovation Review in Arabic.

Haykal also founded Lubelb, a company specializing in artificial intelligence and Arabic natural language processing. Lubelb provides customized search solutions and other digital services tailored to Arabic-language content. In addition, he established Transtech Information Systems, a company that develops software solutions for enterprises, including cloud-based applications and mobile services.

=== Government Positions ===
In March 2025, Abdul Salam Haykal was appointed Minister of Communications and Information Technology in the Syrian transitional government. Upon his appointment, he outlined several priorities, including addressing citizen grievances, revitalizing the communications sector, modernizing damaged infrastructure, and responding to challenges posed by international sanctions and rapid global technological change.

== Social Activities and Advisory Roles ==
Haykal co-founded the Syrian Association for Young Entrepreneurs and served as the Chairman of its Board of Directors as of 2025. He has served on the Board of Trustees of the American University of Beirut since 2008, and is a member of the Arabic Language Advisory Council of the United Arab Emirates since 2018. He also sits on the advisory board of the Institute on AI and the Humanities at New York University Abu Dhabi. He was selected as a Young Global Leader by the World Economic Forum and has received the Innovation Award from the Arab Thought Foundation for his contributions to the fields of media and technology in the Arab world.

== Awards and recognition ==
Haykal was named a "Young Global Leader" by the World Economic Forum. He also received the Media Creativity Award from the Arab Thought Foundation in recognition of his contributions to the fields of media and technology.
