= Hazem al-Sharaa =

Syrian lawyer (born 1975)

- حازم الشرع

Vice President of the Supreme Council for Economic Development
- In office July 2025 – 8 May 2026
- President: Ahmed al-Sharaa
- Succeeded by: Vacant

Personal details
- Born: 1974 (age 51–52)
- Parent: Hussein al-Sharaa (father)
- Relatives: Sharaa family
- Education: Damascus University (LL.B., 2000); EAIU (M.A., Legal and Economic Sciences, 2007 and Ph.D., Legal and Economic Sciences, 2013)
- Occupation: Lawyer

Hazem al-Sharaa (Arabic: حازم الشرع; born 1974) is a Syrian lawyer. He was the Vice President of the Supreme Council for Economic Development and the older brother of Ahmed al-Sharaa, the current President of Syria.

== Early life and education ==
Hazem al-Sharaa was born in 1974 to Hussein al-Sharaa, a prominent economist. He studied law at Damascus University and became a registered member of the Damascus Bar Association in February 2007. He later earned a master's degree in Legal and Economic Sciences from the Egyptian American International University in January 2007, followed by a doctorate in the same field from the same institution in December 2013.

== Career ==
Al-Sharaa had held various positions in relation to management and sales, including positions at PepsiCo in Syria (Note: Through the beverage company "Joud", the exclusive franchisee of PepsiCo in Syria.) and Iraq. (Note: Through "al-Hayat" company, the exclusive franchisee of PepsiCo in the Kurdistan Region of Iraq.)

=== Syrian transitional government ===
Al-Sharaa's public profile rose when he appeared as part of a Syrian delegation to Saudi Arabia on 2 February 2025, alongside key government officials as part of Ahmed al-Sharaa's first international trip as president of Syria. His presence in this high-ranking diplomatic meeting, particularly his seating arrangement next to Foreign Minister Asaad al-Shaibani, led to speculation about his exact role in the government. Al-Sharaa appeared again during the Syrian delegation's visit to Turkey on 4 February 2025, he was again seated next to the Foreign Minister without any information about his role. Before these appearances, al-Sharaa was residing in Erbil, Kurdistan Region, Iraq, and had not been previously known for any political or diplomatic involvement, either before or after the fall of the Assad regime.

On 27 February 2025, Syrian businessmen reported a meeting between the president, Ahmed al-Sharaa, and a group of Syrian investors and business leaders. In their statements, some participants referred to Hazem al-Sharaa as the acting "Director of the Investment Agency" of Syria. Some reports said he was appointed as acting director of the Syrian Investment Agency, but a later investigation by Reuters in July 2025 showed he holds no official position.

=== Reuters Investigation ===
The Reuters investigation revealed that Hazem al‑Sharaa was supervising a covert economic committee tasked with restructuring Syria's economy following the fall of Ba'athist regime. The economy had been severely damaged by years of corruption and international sanctions. The committee operated under pseudonyms and was reported to be led by Hazem al‑Sharaa alongside an Australian businessman operating under the alias "Abu Mariam al‑Australi". (Note: "Al-Australi" in Arabic means "the Australian".) The latter was identified as Abraham Succarieh, an Australian of Lebanese descent who had been sanctioned by Australian authorities for alleged terrorism financing.

According to Reuters, the committee discreetly took control of or negotiated private settlements worth approximately US $1.6 billion in assets owned by Assad-era businessmen, including stakes in major firms such as the country's leading telecom operator. To avoid judicial disruption and to preserve economic continuity, the committee reportedly offered immunity in exchange for cash payments and corporate control, a strategy criticized for effectively replacing one oligarchy with another. Though not holding any formal public office related to the restructuring effort, Hazem al‑Sharaa is said to have overseen the operation. He was also reported to be poised to manage a newly established sovereign wealth fund created by President Ahmed al‑Sharaa in early July 2025, which would report directly to the presidency.

=== Vice President of the Supreme Council For Economic Development ===
In December 2025, the Qatari Businessmen Association received a Syrian delegation led by al-Sharaa, Vice President of the Supreme Council for Economic Development, who said that Qatar was among the first countries to invest in Syria to place it on the international investment map by strengthening international relations and attracting major companies for its reconstruction.

On 24 February 2026, Hussein al-Sharaa told Zaman al-Wasl that President Ahmed al-Sharaa intended to dismiss his brothers, Maher al-Sharaa and Hazem al-Sharaa, from their government positions. According to Zaman al-Wasl, the move was part of an effort to restructure the president’s inner circle and address criticism over nepotism. On 8 May 2026, i24NEWS reported that Hazem resigned from his role as Vice President of the Supreme Council for Economic Development.
