= International University for Science and Technology =

University in Daraa, Syria

- الْجَامِعَةُ الدَّوْلِيَّةُ الْخَاصَّةُ لِلْعُلُومِ وَالتِّكْنُولُوجِيَا
- Motto: A lifelong commitment to knowledge.
- Type: Private
- Established: 2005
- President: Prof. Dr. Amar Nasser Agha
- Academic staff: 277
- Administrative staff: --
- Location: Ghabaghib, Daraa 37km from Damascus, Syria; 33.1830078°N 36.2956869°E
- Campus: Urban
- Language: Arabic
- Website: iust.edu.sy

The International University for Science and Technology (IUST; Arabic: الْجَامِعَةُ الدَّوْلِيَّةُ الْخَاصَّةُ لِلْعُلُومِ وَالتِّكْنُولُوجِيَا, romanized: al-Jāmiʿat ad-Dawlīyat al-Khāṣṣat li l-ʿUlūm wa t-Tiknūlūjiyā) is a private university established in 2005, located in Ghabagheb, Daraa Governorate, Syria. The university has seven faculties: dentistry, pharmacy, engineering and technology, information technology, business administration and finance, arts and sciences, and Architecture. The university has a liaison office at Damascus, Al Mazzeh Eastern villas. The language of most instruction is English across all colleges, including the health sciences. All courses, including instruction, coursework, and clinical training, are conducted mostly in English.

== History ==
After the beginning of the Syrian civil war in 2011, the university headquarters moved temporarily in 2013 to Damascus city in Kiwan opposite Tishreen Park near Umayyad Square, and continued in Kiwan until 2019 when it returned to its original headquarters in Ghabagheb.

== Faculties ==
IUST includes seven faculties.

== Organisation ==
IUST comprises the following seven colleges that meet the needs and demands of the local Syrian community and the Arab and regional communities as well:

- College of Business and Finance
- College of Information Technology
- College of Engineering and Technology
- College of Dentistry
- College of Pharmacy
- College of Arts and Sciences
- College of Architecture

== Co-operation agreements ==
The university has signed several cooperation agreements with Arab and international universities, such as:

- University of Damascus
- University of Utah
- Brno University of Technology
- Montana State University
- University of Philadelphia - Jordan
- O. P. Jindal Global University - India
- University of Petra - Jordan
- Al Hawash University

== Services ==
International University for Science and Technology serves two types of services. The first one is for the students, and the second one is for the teachers.

== Electronic Education Gate ==
Edugate is a system composed of several services for visitors to the gate and the students and teachers.

== Sustainable development office ==
The sustainable development office started in 2023. The office focuses on the SDGs at the university. As a new office related to the SDG office at the university, IUST have opened an office for Social Guidance Office and Psychology since 9 December 2023. It aims at providing guidance services to students and teaching and administrative staff.

== Research ==
There are multiple scientific research projects and published articles at International University for Science and Technology. For example, published articles of Faculty of Dentistry about dental implant, frenectomy, apices, and tumors. These projects are from Faculty of Dentistry clinics at International University for Science and Technology. Other examples from the Faculty of Engineering and Technology includes artificial intelligence, diapers, designing of smiles and superconductors. Other research published by IUST is about the use of artificial intelligence (AI) for sustainable urbanisation, applications of artificial intelligence in breast diseases, and thermodynamics. In addition, the university contributes to the open access project in MENA countries. Besides, research on applications of AI in water resources management and study of climate changes. Also, applications of AI in metamaterials and metasurfaces

== International relationships of the university ==
International University for Science and Technology has multiple shared international projects and relations. For example, Moral project which is a structural project co-funded by the ERASMUS+ Programme of the European Union.
