= Mohammed Yassin Saleh =

Syrian politician and media figure

- محمد صالح
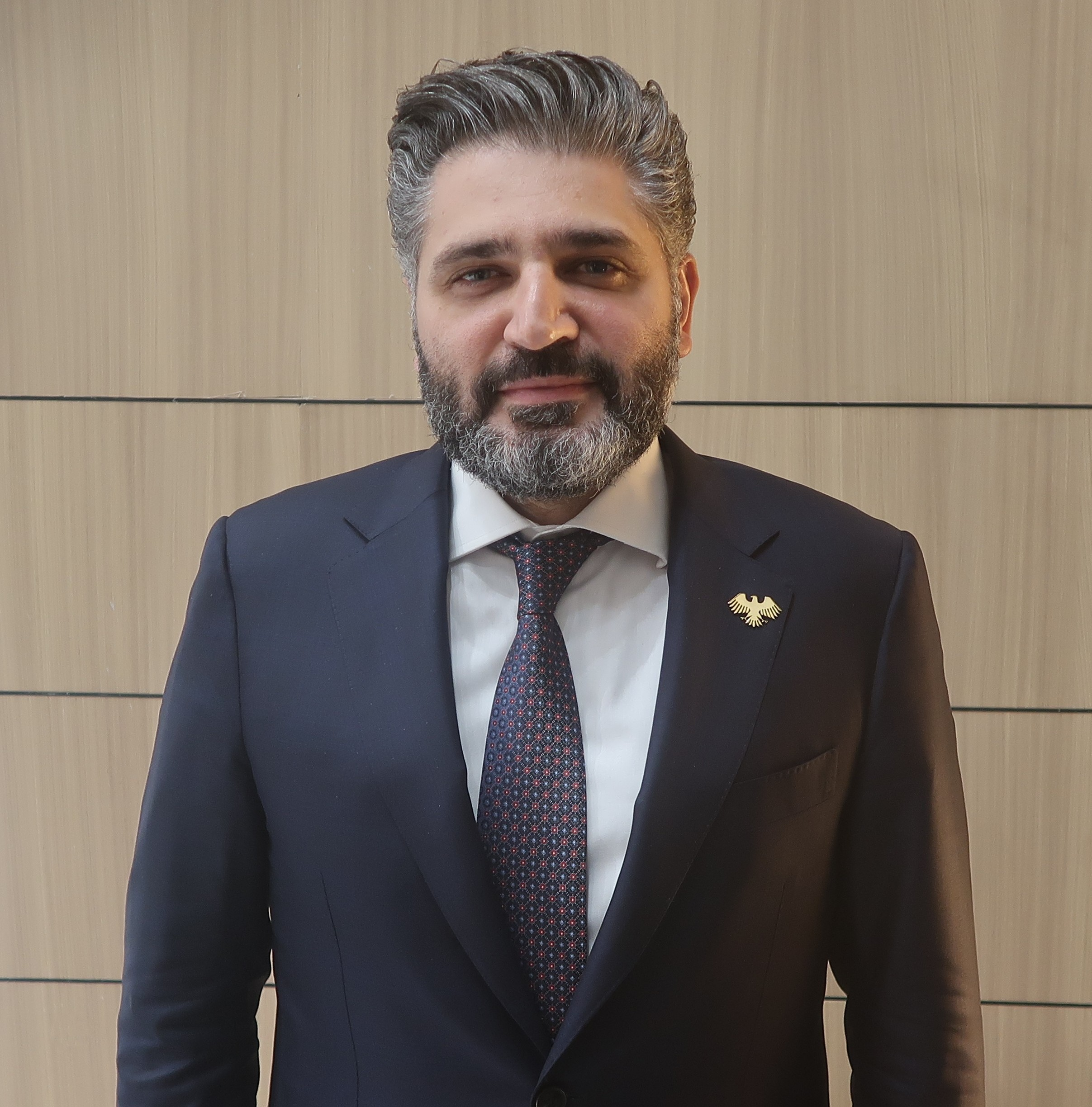
- Saleh in 2025

Minister of Culture
- Incumbent
- Assumed office 29 March 2025
- President: Ahmed al-Sharaa
- Preceded by: Diala Barakat (Note: Vacant from 10 December 2024 until 29 March 2025)

Personal details
- Born: 1985 (age 40–41)
- Party: Independent
- Education: London Metropolitan University (BA); University of Westminster (MA)
- Occupation: Journalist, media presenter, politician

Mohammed Yassin Saleh (Note: Arabic: محمد ياسين صالح, sometimes referred to as Mohammed Al-Saleh) (born 1985) is a Syrian journalist, poet and a politician who has served as Minister of Culture in the Syrian transitional government since 29 March 2025.

== Life and career ==
Born in 1985, in the Syrian city Qudsaya , Saleh holds a bachelor's degree in linguistics from London Metropolitan University and a master's degree in translation from the University of Westminster. Known for his passion for the Arabic language and its aesthetics, Saleh has worked to promote linguistic richness and literary heritage throughout his early career.

Saleh began his media career with the Qatari broadcaster Al Jazeera, where he gained recognition for presenting programs such as Al-Mir'aat al-Sahafa and Al-Marsad. He later launched Ta'amulat (Reflections), a program dedicated to literature and the Arabic language. In 2016, he won first place in Qatar's prestigious "Fasih al-Arab" (Eloquent Arab) competition.

Following the fall of the Assad regime, Saleh was appointed Minister of Culture in the country's transitional government.

In his speech before taking the oath of office, he highlighted the need for cultural policy to align with humanitarian priorities, stating that "there can be no fruitful culture during misery" and calling for engagement with Arab neighbors to dismantle barriers left by the former regime.

He met with President Ahmed al-Sharaa on 20 October 2025, where he was part of a discussion, where "arrangements related to the national anthem of the Syrian Arab Republic were addressed."

== Controversy ==
=== Al-Marsoumi's guesthouse ===
In April 2025, Saleh sparked widespread criticism after he and Jamal al-Sharaa (Ahmed al-Sharaa's brother) appeared at the guesthouse of Sheikh Farhan al-Marsoumi in Deir ez-Zor Governorate. Al-Marsoumi was widely known for his staunch allegiance to Iranian-backed militias and his alleged involvement in drug trafficking and major human rights violations against local populations. He was regarded as a key figure affiliated with Iran's Islamic Revolutionary Guard Corps (IRGC) in eastern Syria, playing a central role in recruiting youth into the Iranian-backed 47th Regiment and reinforcing Tehran's influence over both social and military structures in the region. Additionally, he has reportedly managed extensive arms and drug smuggling operations under the protection of the 4th Armoured Division, capitalizing on his close ties with Maher al-Assad.

Saleh's appearance at the gathering triggered public outrage, with many questioning how a senior government official could attend such meetings without prior vetting or knowledge of the individuals' backgrounds and affiliations. In response to the backlash, Saleh issued a public apology via a post on the social media platform X, stating: "Every day, I am asked to take hundreds of photos with people, and I cannot discern their intentions or affiliations. I extend my sincere apology to the great Syrian people for any unintended photograph with an individual associated with the former regime".

On 20 April 2025, the Syrian Presidency released a statement addressing the controversy surrounding the gathering at al-Marsoumi's guesthouse. In response to widespread discussion about the presence of government figures at the event, the presidency clarified that Jamal al-Sharaa does not hold any official government position or title and does not enjoy any formal privileges. Notably, the statement made no reference to Saleh.
