= Aladdin al-Droubi =

Syrian politician

- علاء الدين الدروبي
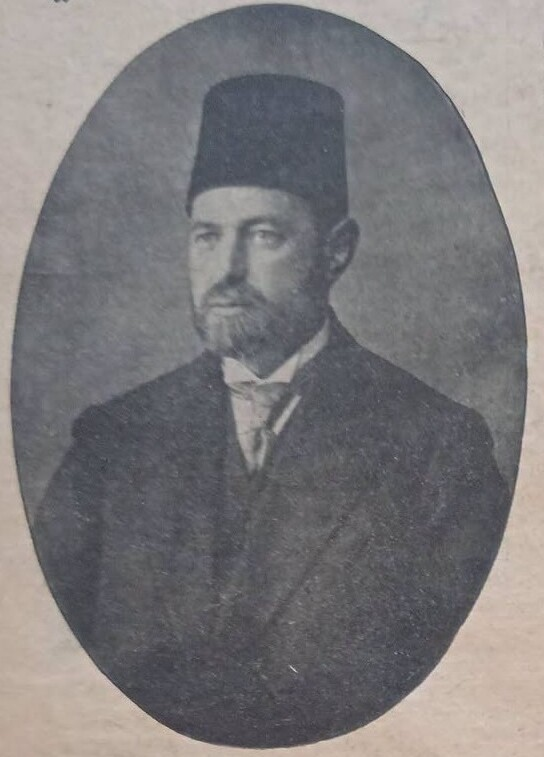

Prime Minister of Syria
- In office 26 July 1920 – 21 August 1920
- Preceded by: Rida Pasha al-Rikabi; Hashim al-Atassi (interim)
- Succeeded by: Jamil al-Ulshi

Governor of Damascus
- In office 1918–1920
- Preceded by: Office established
- Succeeded by: Vacant; Nawras al-Kilani (in 1925)

Personal details
- Born: 1870 Homs, Ottoman Syria
- Died: 21 August 1920 (aged 49–50) Khirbet Ghazaleh, Syria
- Party: Independent

Alaa al-Din Pasha bin Abdul Hamid Pasha al-Droubi (Arabic: علاء الدين باشا بن عبد الحميد باشا الدروبي; 1870 – 21 August 1920) was a Syrian politician who served as Prime Minister of Syria for a month before his assassination in 1920.

== Early life ==
Al-Droubi was born in Homs, Ottoman Syria in a well-known Sunni family with rich traditions. Together with his two brothers he studied law and politics in Istanbul, and graduated from the Galata Institute as it was called at that time. According to Sami Moubayed, he was one of the many doctors of Sultan Abdul-Hamid II.

== Career ==
Al-Droubi first served as an ambassador for the Sublime Porte in the Balkans, before being appointed wali of the Yemen vilayet and later governor of Basra on 27 March 1913. After the Ottoman Empire's fall in 1918, al-Droubi aligned himself with the Hashemite rule in Damascus, in which he was appointed wali of Damascus and consultant to military governor Rida Pasha al-Rikabi. He then became head of the Consultative Bureau to King Faisal I, a position he held throughout Faisal's reign.

Before going into exile, Faisal appointed al-Droubi as prime minister on 26 July 1920. However, al-Droubi cooperated extensively with the French administration, adopting a pro-French stance. He significantly increased taxes to support the French army, confiscated weapons from civilians, and abolished the Ministry of Foreign Affairs, stating that Syria's international relations were now under French control. His passive stance during the creation of an independent Lebanon further angered Syrians.

On 21 August 1920, al-Droubi was killed in an ambush at Khirbet Ghazaleh along with the head of the Consultative Bureau, Abd al-Rahman al-Youssef, by supporters of King Faisal while traveling by train to Hauran. His body was eventually taken to his hometown and buried on 20 September of that same year.

Following the incident, General Henri Gouraud, the High Commissioner of the Levant, sent a telegram of condolence to the members of the Syrian government and the families of al-Droubi and al-Youssef. The text is as follows:

Telegram from His Excellency General Gouraud, High Commissioner of the French Republic in Syria and Cilicia, and Commander-in-Chief of the Army of the East:

To the Members of the Government of Damascus and the Families of Aladdin al-Droubi and Abd al-Rahman Pasha al-Youssef. I was deeply saddened and shocked by the tragic deaths of Aladdin Bey al-Droubi, the Prime Minister, and Abd al-Rahman Bey al-Youssef, the President of the Consultative Bureau. I extend my sincere condolences to the members of the Government of Damascus and to their esteemed families.

Aladdin Bey al-Droubi and Abd al-Rahman Pasha al-Youssef met their fates while engaged in the honorable mission of reconciliation that they had undertaken. I offer my sympathy to all who loved and respected them among the citizens and friends, and I share the regret of all who appreciate the services they rendered to the country.

—
