= List of governors of Damascus =

Governor of Damascus
- The seal of Damascus Governorate.

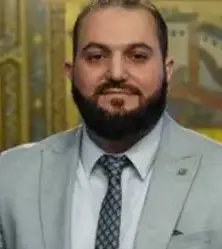
- Incumbent; Maher Marwan since 15 December 2024
- Style: His Excellency
- Appointer: President of Syria
- Term length: No term limits
- Inaugural holder: Aladdin Al-Droubi
- Formation: 1918
- Website: damascus.gov.sy

The following is a list of governors of Damascus city and governorate since 1918.

== List of officeholders (1918–present) ==
Person	Name in Arabic	Time as mayor
Aladdin Al-Droubi	علاء الدين الدروبي	1918 - 1920
Nawras al-Kilani	نورس الكيلاني	6 June 1925 - August 1926
Aref al-Khatib	عارف الخطيب	September 1926
Bahij al-Khatib	بهيج الخطيب	6 February 1936 - 2 March 1936
Tawfiq al-Hayani	توفيق الحياني	2 March 1936 - 1937
Fayez al-Shehabi	فايز الشهابي	1937 - 19 June 1940
Sofouh al-Azm	صفوح العظم	19 June 1940 - February 1942
Husni al-Barazi	حسني البرازي	February 1942 - April 1942
Aref al-Hamzawi	عارف الحمزاوي	April 1942 - December 1944
Mazhar al-Bakri	مظهر البكري	December 1944 - November 1946
Nabih al-Azma	نبيه العظمة	November 1946 - December 1946
Behjat Shehabi	بهجت شهابي	December 1946 - April 1949
Khalil Refaat	خليل رفعت	April 1949
Abdel Hamid Mardini	عبد الحميد مارديني	April 1949 - 15 October 1949
Sayed al-Yousef	سيد اليوسف	March 1950 - 26 January 1951
Rashad Jabri	رشاد جبري	1951 - 1952
Nasuh al-Ayyubi	نصوح الأيوبي	1952 - 1954
Abdel Hamid Mardini	عبد الحميد مارديني	February 1954 - April 1954
Ismail Qoli	اسماعيل قلي	April 1954 - September 1954
Mustafa Malik Noor Allah	مصطفى مالك نور الله	1954
Mokhtar Diab	مختار دياب	1954 - 1957
Bashir al-Qudmani	بشير القضماني	1957 - 1960
Abdul Salam Termanini	عبد السلام ترمانيني	1961
Majed al-Ghazi	ماجد الغازي	1961 - May 1962
Ibrahim al-Hamzawi	ابراهيم الحمزاوي	May 1962 - April 1963
Abd al-Rahman al-Mardini	عبد الرحمن المارديني	April 1963 - May 1964
Sufouh as-Sawwaf	صفوح الصواف	July 1964 - April 1966
Muhammad al-Sioufi	محمد السيوفي	November 1967 - February 1969
Muhammad Ali al-Halabi	محمد علي الحلبي	February 1969 - July 1971
Mohammed Yassin Alasta	محمد ياسين الاسطة	January 1972 - December 1974
Farouk al-Hamwi	فاروق الحموي	August 1975 - 1979
Abdul Rauf al-Kasm	عبد الرؤوف الكسم	June 1979 - March 1980
Mohammed al-Sioufi	محمد السيوفي	March 1980 - March 1982
Adnan Quli	عدنان قولي	March 1982 - May 1985
Ghassan al-Halabi	غسان الحلبي	November 1985 - November 1987
Mohammed Amin Abu Al-Shamat	محمد امين ابو الشامات	December 1987 - April 1990
Muhammad Walid Hamamiyeh	محمد وليد حمامية	May 1991 - July 1994
Mohamed Zuhair Tilbi	محمد زهير تغلبي	July 1994 - August 1999
Nabil Nasri	نبيل نصري	August 1999 - February 2001
Ghassan al-Lahham	غسان اللحام	February 2001 - September 2003
Muhammad Bashar al-Mufti	محمد بشار المفتي	22 January 2004 - 26 November 2006
Bishr al-Sabban	بشر الصبان	1 May 2006 - 26 November 2018
Adel al-Olabi	عادل العلبي	26 November 2018 - 20 July 2022
Mohammad Tariq Kreishati	محمد طارق كريشاتي	20 July 2022 - 8 December 2024
Mohammad Yasser Ghazal (acting)	محمد ياسر غزال	10 December - 15 December 2024
Maher Marwan	ماهر مروان	15 December 2024 – Present

== See also ==
- Damascus
- History of Damascus
- Timeline of Damascus
- List of governors of Aleppo
- List of governors of Homs
