= Idlib University =

Public university in Syria

Coordinates: 35.9406°N 36.6227°E

- جامعة إدلب
- Type: Public
- Established: 2 August 2015; 11 years ago
- Academic affiliations: UNAI; UNIMED
- Students: 18,603
- Location: Idlib, Syria
- Language: Arabic
- Colors: Green and Yellow
- Website: idlib.edu.sy

Idlib University (Arabic: ْجَامِعَةُ إِدْلِب, romanized: Jāmiʻatu Idlib) is a Syrian public university established in 2015. In 2026, Idlib University ranked 11080 globally (was 29478 in 2021), according to Webometrics Ranking of World Universities.

Today, the number of university students has exceeded 18,000, and the university's teaching and administrative staff has exceeded 600 people.

It initially included several colleges and institutes, then opened new branches, colleges and departments in the following years. A branch of Idlib University was opened in Al-Dana in 2020, and another branch was opened in Salqin city in 2024.

== Faculties ==
The university includes seventeen faculties distributed as follows:

- Faculty of Medicine
- Faculty of Dentistry
- Faculty of Pharmacy
- Faculty of Informatics Engineering
- Faculty of Civil Engineering
- Faculty of Architecture
- Faculty of Electrical and Electronic Engineering.
- Faculty of Mechanical Engineering
- Faculty of Agricultural Engineering
- Faculty of Health Sciences
- Faculty of Veterinary Medicine
- Faculty of Science
- Faculty of Economics and Management
- Faculty of Sharia and Law
- Faculty of Political Science and Media
- Faculty of Education
- Faculty of Arts

=== Branch of Idlib University ===
- Faculty of Economics and Management
- Faculty of Arts
- Faculty of Education

== Institutes ==
The university includes five institutes distributed as follows:

- Turkish Language Institute
- Computer Technical Institute
- Technical Institute for Medical Equipment
- Technical Institute for Financial and Administrative Sciences
- Engineering Technical Institute

=== Branch of Idlib University ===
- Turkish Language Institute
- Technical Institute for Financial and Administrative Sciences

== Medical facilities ==
- Idlib University Hospital
- Dental clinics at the Faculty of Dentistry

== See also ==
- List of universities in Syria
