= Umayyad Park =

Park in Syria

Umayyad Park in 2024

Umayyad Park (Arabic: حديقة الأمويين, romanized: Ḥadīqat al-Umawiyyīn, lit. 'Umayyads' Park'), formerly known as Tishreen Park is the largest park in Damascus, Syria. It is located near Umayyad Square and Tishreen Palace.

A large 110-meter high Syrian flagpole was installed in the park in July 2010 to mark the tenth anniversary of Bashar Al Assad becoming president.

The park hosts the annual Damascus International Flower Show, which at its peak before the war would be visited by hundreds of thousands of people per year.

A new Syrian flag was raised on 110-meter flagpole in 2025. As of December 2025, it is the 26th tallest flagpole in the world.
