= Mohammad Ghazi al-Jalali =

Prime Minister of Syria in 2024

- محمد غازي الجلالي

Prime Minister of Syria
- In office 14 September 2024 – 10 December 2024 (Note: Acting: 8 – 10 December 2024)
- President: Bashar al-Assad
- Preceded by: Hussein Arnous
- Succeeded by: Mohammed al-Bashir

Minister of Communications and Information Technology
- In office 27 August 2014 – 3 July 2016
- Prime Minister: Wael Nader al-Halqi
- Preceded by: Emad Abdul-Ghani Sabouni
- Succeeded by: Ali al-Dhafir

Deputy Minister of Communications and Information Technology
- In office May 2008 – 27 August 2014
- Minister: Emad Abdul-Ghani Sabouni

Chancellor of Syrian Private University
- In office 11 September 2023 – 14 September 2024
- Succeeded by: Prof. Dr. Edmon Saloum

Personal details
- Born: 22 March 1969 (age 57) Damascus, Syria
- Party: Independent (since 2024)
- Other political affiliations: Arab Socialist Ba'ath Party (2004–2024)
- Children: 3
- Education: University of Damascus (BCE); Ain Shams University (PhD)
- Cabinet: Second Hussein Arnous government; Mohammad Ghazi al-Jalali government; Syrian caretaker government

Mohammad Ghazi al-Jalali (Arabic: محمد غازي الجلالي; born 22 March 1969) is a Syrian politician and civil engineer who served as the prime minister of Syria from 14 September to 10 December 2024. He is the last person to serve as prime minister of Syria under the presidency of Bashar al-Assad and the last head of government of the Ba'athist regime.

Bashar al-Assad named him prime minister on 14 September 2024, following the 2024 parliamentary election. He previously held the position of minister of communications and information technology in the second government of Wael Nader al-Halqi from 27 August 2014 to 3 July 2016.

Following the fall of the Assad regime on 8 December, he remained in Damascus and managed the transfer of power from the government to the rebels before being replaced by Mohammed al-Bashir two days later.

== Early life and education ==
Mohammad Ghazi Al-Jalali was born in Damascus in 1969. He graduated with a BA in civil engineering in 1992 and completed a postgraduate diploma in civil engineering from Damascus University in 1994. He also completed a Master of Science in civil engineering in 1997, and a PhD in engineering economics from Ain Shams University, Cairo in 2000.

== Career ==
Mohammad Ghazi al-Jalali worked as an assistant to the minister of communications and technology from 2008 until he took over the ministry on 10 August 2014, and as chairman of the board of directors of the General Postal Corporation during the same period, and a member of the board of directors of the General Corporation for Road Transport from 2005 until 2013.

Jalali was also a member of the Higher Education Council at the Ministry of Higher Education from 2008 until his appointment as Minister of Communications and Technology, and he is an assistant professor at the University of Damascus.

Jalali held the position of minister of communications and technology from 10 August 2014, until 3 July 2016, in the second government of Wael al-Halqi. After leaving the ministry, he held the position of the chairman of the Board of Trustees of Arab Quality Makers since April 2019 and chancellor of the Syrian Private University from 11 September 2023 until his appointment as prime minister.

== Premiership (September–December 2024) ==
On 14 September 2024, Syrian president Bashar al-Assad issued a decree assigning Jalali to form the government in Syria, following the 2024 Syrian parliamentary election. In a later interview, Jalali recalled that in their final phone call, the night before the fall of the regime, Assad was informed of the deteriorating situation and reportedly replied, "We'll see tomorrow."

=== Fall of the Assad regime ===
On 8 December 2024, Jalali acknowledged the fall of President Assad's Baathist government and announced that he was extending his hand to the opposition, emphasizing the preservation of state institutions. Ahmed al-Sharaa, the leader of Hay'at Tahrir al-Sham, announced that Jalali would head the government on an interim basis until the formalization of a new governing arrangement. Later that day, Jalali called for democratic elections to be held so the Syrian people could choose their new leaders. He stated that Hay'at Tahrir al-Sham contacted the leaders, and the armed men promised that there would be no repression. Jalali also said that he and 18 other ministers had made their decision to stay in Damascus and not leave the country. On the same day, a video was published showing Jalali being escorted in Damascus by Southern Operations Room militia, who had taken control of the capital earlier in the day.

The following day, Mohammed al-Bashir was appointed as new prime minister of the Syrian caretaker government and Jalali withdrew from his duties.

== See also ==
- List of Prime Ministers of Syria

== Notes ==
Political offices
| Preceded by Hussein Arnous | Prime Minister of Syria; 2024 | Succeeded by Mohammed al-Bashir |
