= Damascus Governorate =

Damascus Governorate محافظة دمشق
- Governorate
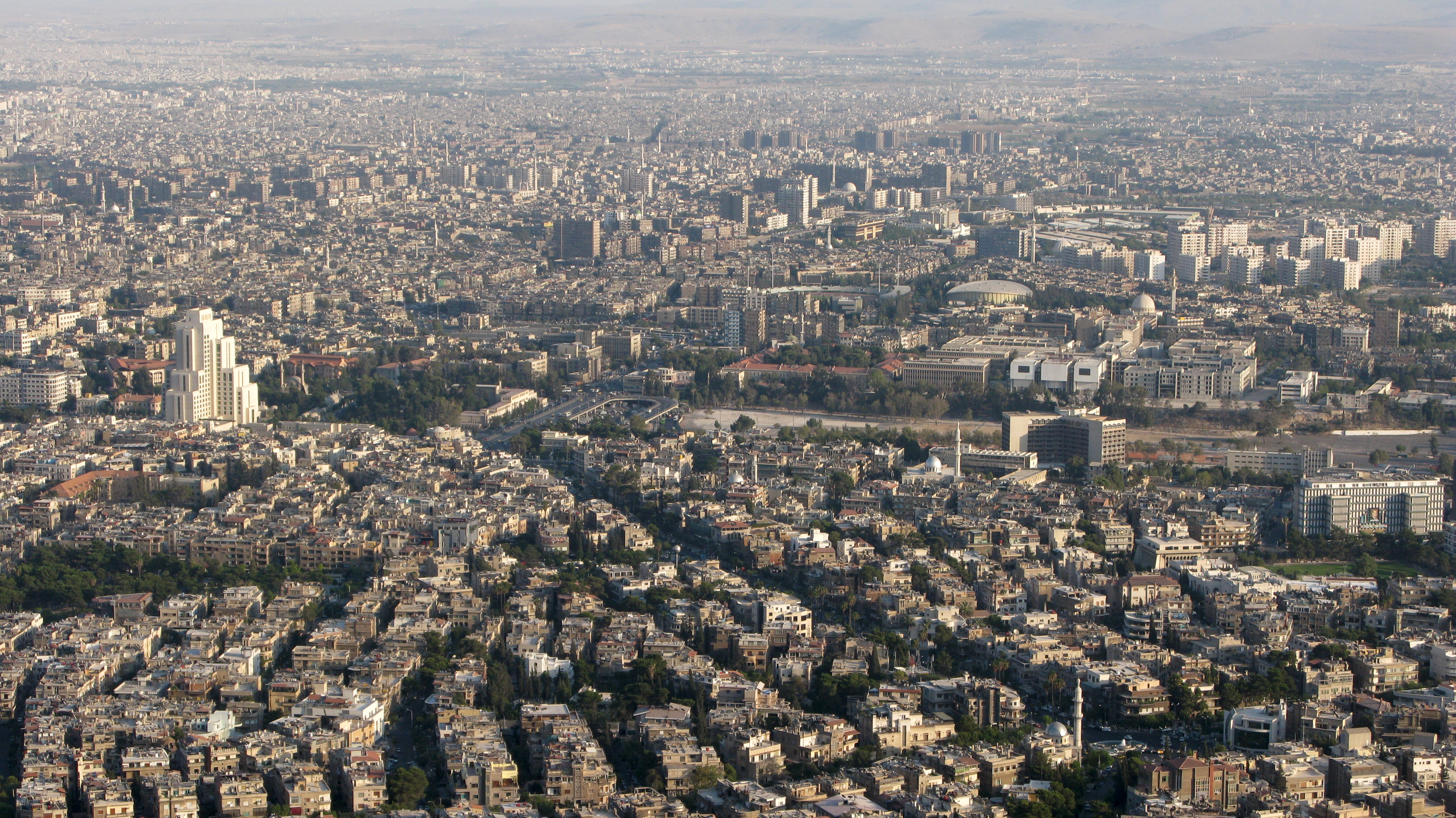

- Coat of arms

- Map of Syria with Damascus highlighted
- Interactive map of Damascus Governorate
- Coordinates (Damascus): 33.513°N 36.292°E
- Country: Syria
- Capital: Damascus

Government
  - Governor: Maher Marwan

Population (2022 est.)
  - Total: 2,685,000
- Time zone: UTC+3 (AST)
- ISO 3166 code: SY-DI
- Main language(s): Arabic

Damascus Governorate (Arabic: مُحافظة دمشق Muḥāfaẓat Dimashq) is one of the fourteen governorates (provinces) of Syria. Completely surrounded by the Rif Dimashq Governorate, it consists only of the city of Damascus, the capital of Syria.

The governorate's area is around 107 km^{2}, encompassing the area of the city of Damascus, while the population is around 2,503,000.

== Geography ==
Damascus occupies a strategic location on a plateau which rises 680 m (2,230 ft) above sea level and about 80 km (50 mi) inland from the Mediterranean, sheltered by the Anti-Lebanon mountains, supplied with water by the Barada River. The Anti-Lebanon mountains which mark the border between Syria and Lebanon, block precipitation from the Mediterranean sea, so that the region of Damascus is sometimes subject to droughts. However, in ancient times this was mitigated by the Barada River, which originates from mountain streams fed by melting snow. Damascus is surrounded by the Ghouta, an irrigated farmland where many vegetables, cereals, and fruits have been farmed since ancient times.

The governorate occupies an area of 107 km^{2}, 79 km^{2} of which is urban while the rest is occupied by Mount Qasioun which overlooks the city.

== Climate ==
Damascus has a cold desert climate (BWk) in Köppen-Geiger system, due to the rain shadow effect of the Anti-Lebanon mountains and the prevailing ocean currents. Summers are dry and hot with less humidity. Winters are cool and somewhat rainy; snowfall is infrequent. Annual rainfall is around 130 mm (5 in), occurring from October to May.

Climate data for Damascus (Damascus International Airport) 1981–2010
Month	Jan	Feb	Mar	Apr	May	Jun	Jul	Aug	Sep	Oct	Nov	Dec	Year
Record high °C (°F)	24.0 (75.2)	29.0 (84.2)	34.4 (93.9)	38.4 (101.1)	41.0 (105.8)	44.8 (112.6)	46.0 (114.8)	44.6 (112.3)	42.0 (107.6)	37.8 (100.0)	31.0 (87.8)	25.1 (77.2)	46.0 (114.8)
Mean daily maximum °C (°F)	12.6 (54.7)	14.5 (58.1)	19.0 (66.2)	24.7 (76.5)	30.1 (86.2)	34.6 (94.3)	37.0 (98.6)	36.8 (98.2)	33.9 (93.0)	28.1 (82.6)	20.1 (68.2)	14.3 (57.7)	25.5 (77.9)
Daily mean °C (°F)	6.1 (43.0)	7.7 (45.9)	11.4 (52.5)	16.2 (61.2)	20.8 (69.4)	25.0 (77.0)	27.3 (81.1)	27.0 (80.6)	24.0 (75.2)	19.0 (66.2)	12.1 (53.8)	7.5 (45.5)	17.0 (62.6)
Mean daily minimum °C (°F)	0.7 (33.3)	1.9 (35.4)	4.3 (39.7)	7.9 (46.2)	11.4 (52.5)	15.0 (59.0)	17.9 (64.2)	17.7 (63.9)	14.4 (57.9)	10.3 (50.5)	4.8 (40.6)	1.7 (35.1)	9.0 (48.2)
Record low °C (°F)	−12.2 (10.0)	−12 (10)	−8 (18)	−7.5 (18.5)	0.6 (33.1)	4.5 (40.1)	9.0 (48.2)	8.6 (47.5)	2.1 (35.8)	−3.0 (26.6)	−8 (18)	−10.2 (13.6)	−12.2 (10.0)
Average precipitation mm (inches)	25.0 (0.98)	26.0 (1.02)	20.0 (0.79)	7.0 (0.28)	4.0 (0.16)	1.0 (0.04)	0.0 (0.0)	0.0 (0.0)	0.3 (0.01)	6.0 (0.24)	21.0 (0.83)	21.0 (0.83)	131.3 (5.18)
Average precipitation days	8	8	6	3	2	0.1	0.1	0.1	0.2	3	5	7	42.5
Average snowy days	1	1	0.1	0	0	0	0	0	0	0	0	0.2	2.3
Average relative humidity (%)	76	69	59	50	43	41	44	48	47	52	63	75	56
Mean monthly sunshine hours	164.3	182.0	226.3	249.0	322.4	357.0	365.8	353.4	306.0	266.6	207.0	164.3	3,164.1
Mean daily sunshine hours	5.3	6.5	7.3	8.3	10.4	11.9	11.8	11.4	10.2	8.6	6.9	5.3	8.5
Source 1: Pogoda.ru.net
Source 2: NOAA (sunshine hours, 1961–1990)

== Demographics ==
Religious composition of Damascus Governorate (2011)
Sunnis	90%
Alawites	5%
Christians	3%
Shias	1%
Druze	0.3%
Ismailis	0.1%

Historical population
Year	Pop.	±%
2011	1,754,000	—
2018	2,211,042	+26.1%
2022	2,685,000	+21.4%
2023	2,585,000	−3.7%
2024	2,685,000	+3.9%
2025	2,800,000	+4.3%
2026	2,922,000	+4.4%

By the end of 2011, Damascus's population reached 1,754,000. This amounts to 8% of Syria's population. It is composed of 95% Arabs, 4% Kurds, and 1% other ethnicities, including Palestinians, Armenians, Assyrians, Turkmen, Circassians, and Chechens.

As for religious composition, Sunni Muslims made up the absolute majority with 90% of the governorate, while Alawites made up 5%, Christians (mainly Greek Orthodox, Greek Catholic, Syriac Orthodox, Syriac Catholic, and Armenian Orthodox) made up 3%, Twelver Shia Muslims made up 1%, the Druze made up 0.3%, and Ismaili Muslims made up 0.1%.
