= Ministry of Communications and Information Technology (Syria) =

Government ministry of Syria

- وزارة الإتصالات وتقانة المعلومات

Agency overview
- Formed: 2003
- Jurisdiction: Government of Syria
- Headquarters: Damascus
- Minister responsible: Abdulsalam Haykal
- Website: moct.gov.sy

The Ministry of Communications and Information Technology (Arabic: وزارة الإتصالات وتقانة المعلومات, romanized: Wizārat al-Ittiṣālāt wa-Taqānat al-Maʿlūmāt) in Syria is the ministry that is responsible for the enforcement of government communications and information policies.

== List of Ministers ==
=== Ba'athist Syria ===
- Radwan Martini (2000 – 13 December 2001)
- Mohammad Bashir al-Monjed (13 December 2001 – 21 February 2006)
- Amr Nazir Salem (21 February 2006 – 8 December 2007)
- Imad Abdel Ghani Sabouni (8 December 2007 – 27 August 2014)
- Mohammad Ghazi al-Jalali (27 August 2014 – 3 July 2016)
- Ali al-Dhafir (3 July 2016 – 28 November 2018)
- Iyad Mohammad al-Khatib (28 November 2018 – 8 December 2024)

=== Post-Assad Syria ===
- Iyad Mohammad al-Khatib (8 December 2024 – 10 December 2024)
- Hussein al-Masri (10 December 2024 – 29 March 2025)
- Abdulsalam Haykal (29 March 2025 – present)
