= IPA =

IPA commonly refers to:

- International Phonetic Alphabet, a system of phonetic notation
- India pale ale, a style of beer
- Isopropyl alcohol, a chemical compound

IPA may also refer to:

== Organizations ==
=== International ===
- Insolvency Practitioners Association, of the UK and Ireland
- Institute of Public Administration (disambiguation)
- International Peoples' Assembly
- International Permafrost Association
- International Phonetic Association, the organization behind the International Phonetic Alphabet
- International Play Association
- International Police Association
- International Polka Association
- International Presentation Association, a network of Presentation Sisters
- International Psychoanalytical Association
- International Publishers Association, representing book and journal publishing

=== Australia ===
- Institute of Public Accountants
- Institute of Public Affairs

=== India ===
- Indian Pharmacist Association
- Indian Polo Association

=== United Kingdom ===
- Infrastructure and Projects Authority
- Institute of Practitioners in Advertising
- Involvement and Participation Association, for employee involvement in the workplace

=== United States ===
- Independence Party of America
- Independent Pilots Association
- Independent practice association, of physicians
- Innovations for Poverty Action
- Innovative Products of America, a tool manufacturer
- Institute for Propaganda Analysis
- Island Pacific Academy, Hawaii

=== Other ===
- Independent Psychiatric Association of Russia
- Institute of Public Affairs, Poland
- Instituto Superior Autónomo de Estudos Politécnicos, Portugal
- Instituto de Profesores Artigas, a Uruguayan teacher training institute

== Science ==
- 3-Indolepropionic acid, a biological substance
- Ipa (spider), a genus of spiders

== Technology ==
- .ipa, extension for Apple iOS applications
- "Identity, policy and audit", as in FreeIPA
- Intermediate power amplifier of a radio transmitter

== Other uses ==
- Important Plant Areas, a UK programme
- Indigenous Protected Area, Australia
- Instrument for Pre-Accession Assistance, EU funding programme
- Interaction process analysis
- Interpretative phenomenological analysis to psychological qualitative research
- Investigatory Powers Act 2016, a piece of UK legislation
- IOC code used for some of the Independent Paralympians at the Paralympic Games teams
