= Civil Service College =

Civil Service College may refer to:

- Cayman Islands Civil Service College, Cayman Islands
- Civil Service College, Hong Kong
- Civil Service College, UK, fl. late nineteenth century
- Civil Service College, London, a private organisation that acquired intellectual property from the National School of Government when it closed
- Civil Service College Singapore, Singapore
- École nationale d'administration, France
- Ethiopian Civil Service University, Ethiopia
- National Academy of Governance, China
- National Institute of Public Administration (Damascus), Syria
- National School of Government, United Kingdom, formerly known as the Civil Service College, founded 1970 dissolved 2012
- School of Senior Civil Service, Ukraine

== See also ==
- Academy of Public Administration (disambiguation)
- Institute of Public Administration (disambiguation)
