= Ian Gordon =

Ian Gordon may refer to:

- Ian Gordon (athlete) (born 1950), Canadian Olympic sprinter
- Ian Gordon (footballer) (born 1933), former Australian rules footballer
- Ian Gordon (general) (born 1952), Deputy Chief of Army and Commander of UNTSO
- Ian Gordon (historian) (born 1964), professor of US history at the National University of Singapore
- Ian Gordon (ice hockey) (born 1975), German hockey player
- Ian Gordon (rower) (born 1948), Canadian Olympic rower
- Ian Gordon (rugby union) (born 1968), Canadian rugby union player
- Ian R. Gordon, British geographer and political economist
