= Innovative Products of America =

Innovative Products of America (IPA) is a family-owned and operated original equipment manufacturing and distributing company based out of Woodstock, New York.

Founded in 1991 by President Peter Vinci, an electro-mechanical engineer, the company operates through a traditional three-step distribution process and serves the automotive, fleet, industrial, and agricultural industries. IPA manufactures an array of tools, including remote testers for truck and tractor-trailer braking and electrical systems, air guns designed to clean radiators, disc brake system analyzers, tire inflation systems, and tools to unclog grease fittings. IPA won the PTEN Innovation Award in 2011 and 2012, for their automotive wiring diagnostic tool and fuel pump relay bypass switch, and the Motor Magazine Top 20 Tools Award eight times, with the most recent being in 2011 for their electrical terminal cleaners.

== History ==
IPA was originally located in Mount Tremper, New York with a manufacturing plant in Lancaster, Pennsylvania, but moved its offices and production line to a combined location in Woodstock in 2010. In 2013, IPA announced the acquisition of two new warehouses, former Simulaids buildings, that will serve as a business center with rental offices, mechanical shop, and storage area for IPA as well as other local businesses.

== Selected patents ==
- Temperature and Pressure Sensor for Cooling Systems and Other Pressurized Systems (1994)
- Voltage Probe Testing Device (1997)
- Digital Remote Gauge Assembly (1999)
- Grease Joint Cleaner (2003)
- Methods and Apparatus for Analyzing Internal Combustion Engines (2011)
- Cleaners for Male Electrical Pins (2012)
- Cleaners for Female Electrical Terminals (2012)
