= Passenger vehicles in the United States =

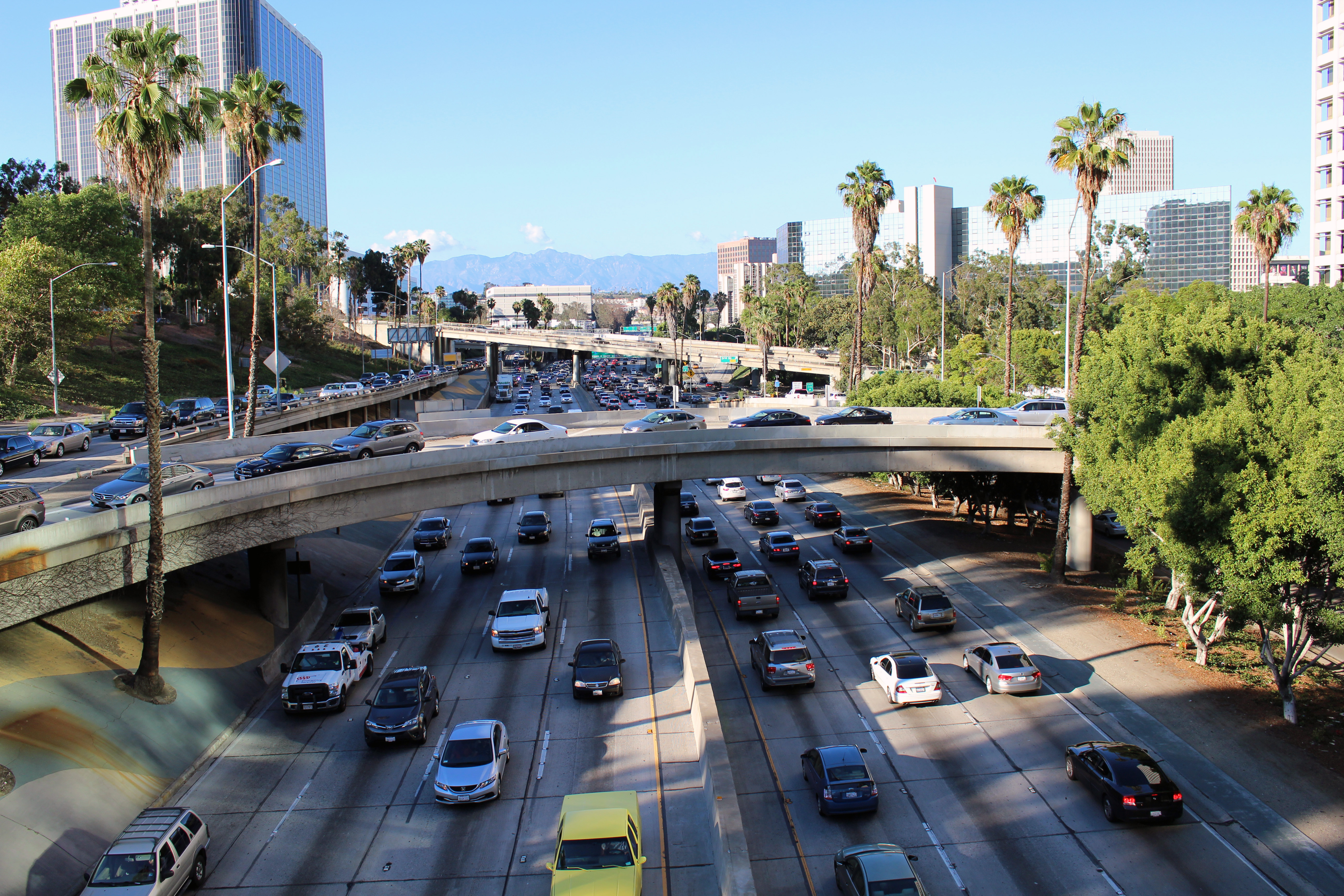
Rush hour on the Harbor Freeway in downtown Los Angeles

The United States is home to the second largest passenger vehicle market of any country in the world, second to China since 2009. In 2024, approximately 297.5 million motor vehicles were registered in the United States. This number, along with the average age of vehicles, has increased steadily since 1960. The United States is also home to three large vehicle manufacturers: General Motors, Ford Motor Company, and Chrysler, which have historically been referred to as the "Big Three".

The National Highway Traffic Safety Administration writes and enforces the Federal Motor Vehicle Safety Standards.

== Statistics ==
The United States Department of Transportation's Federal Highway Administration as well as the National Automobile Dealers Association have published data in regard to the total number of vehicles, growth trends, and ratios between licensed drivers, the general population, and the increasing number of vehicles on American roads. Overall passenger vehicles have been outnumbering licensed drivers since 1972 at an ever-increasing rate, while light trucks and vehicles manufactured by foreign makes have gained a larger share of the automotive market in the United States. In 2001, 70% of Americans drove to work in cars. New York City is the only locality in the country where more than half of all households do not own a car (the figure is even higher in Manhattan, over 75%; nationally, the rate is 8%).

=== Total number of vehicles ===
There are two types of sources for vehicle registration data, known as Vehicles in Operation (VIO): governmental sources such as the Bureau of Transportation Statistics and Federal Highway Administration (FHWA), and commercial, for-profit companies such as IHS and Hedges & Company.

According to the Bureau of Transportation Statistics for 2012, there were 254,639,386 registered vehicles. Of these, 183,171,882 were classified as "Light duty vehicle, short wheel base", while another 50,588,676 were listed as "Light duty vehicle, long wheel base". Another 8,190,286 were classified as vehicles with two axles and six or more tires and 2,469,094 were classified as "Truck, combination". There were 8,454,939 motorcycles also listed along with 764,509 buses.

According to cumulative data by the Federal Highway Administration (FHWA) the number of motor vehicles increased steadily from 1960 to 2006, only stagnating once in 1997 and declining from 1990 to 1991. Otherwise the number of motor vehicles during that period rose by an estimated 3.69 million each year since 1960 with the largest annual growth between 1998 and 1999 as well as between 2000 and 2001 when the number of motor vehicles in the United States increased by eight million. Since the study by the FHWA, the number of vehicles has increased by approximately eleven million, one of the largest recorded increases. The largest percentage increase was between the years of 1972 and 1973 when the number of cars increased by 5.88%.

There are three main reasons commercial VIO data differs from data from the US government. The first is due to variation when data is reported by states to the US government. States are required to report registrations using form FHWA-561 once per calendar year or fiscal year. Forty six states end their fiscal year on June 30 and four end in March, August or September. This data is due to the FHWA by January 1 of the following year, creating a lag time of about six months and thereby not accounting for half a year of changes. Second, the government's definitions of vehicle classifications change over time. A footnote added to FHWA datafiles states, "...Data for 2007–10 were calculated using a new methodology developed by FHWA. Data for these years are based on new categories and are not comparable to previous years". Third, the government can include vehicles not in use, or double-count vehicles that have been transferred across two states. According to the FHWA Office of Highway Policy Information, "Although many States continue to register specific vehicle types on a calendar year basis, all States use some form of the "staggered" system to register motor vehicles. Registration practices for commercial vehicles differ greatly among States. The FHWA data include all vehicles which have been registered at any time throughout the calendar year. Data include vehicles which were retired during the year and vehicles that were registered in more than one State. In some States, it is also possible that contrary to the FHWA reporting instructions, vehicles which have been registered twice in the same State may be reported as two vehicles". (All italics added for emphasis.)

=== Vehicles in Operation (VIO) ===
In the year 2001, the National Automobile Dealers Association conducted a study revealing the average age of vehicles in operation in the US. The study found that of vehicles in operation in the US, 38.3% were older than ten years, 22.3% were between seven and ten years old, 25.8% were between three and six years old, and 13.5% were less than two years old. According to this study the majority of vehicles, 60.6%, of vehicles were older than seven years in 2001. This relatively high age of automobiles in the US might be explained by unaffordable prices for comparable new replacement vehicles and a corresponding gradual decline in sales figures since 1998. Also, many Americans own three or more vehicles. The low marginal cost of registering and insuring additional older vehicles, many of which are rarely used, could cause the study to be skewed as these vehicles are still given full weight in the statistics.

The median and mean age of automobiles has steadily increased since 1969. In 2007, the overall median age for automobiles was 9.4 years, a significant increase over 1990 when the median age of vehicles in operation in the US was 6.5 years and 1969 when the mean age for automobiles was 5.1 years. Of all body styles, pick-up trucks had the highest mean age in 2001 (9.4 years), followed by cars with a mean age of 8.4 years and van with a mean age of 7.0 years. As SUVs are part of a relatively new consumer trend originating mostly in the 1990s, SUVs had the lowest mean age of any body style in the US (6.1 years). The average recreational vehicle was even older with a mean age of 12.5. For all body styles the mean vehicle age increased fairly steadily from 1969 to 2001.

In March 2009, RL Polk released a study conducted between 2007 and 2008 which indicated that the median age of passenger cars in operation in the US increased to 9.4 years, and that the median age for light trucks increased from 7.1 years in 2007 to 7.5 years in 2008. As of 2011, the median age for all vehicles in the US had risen to 10.8 years. While the age has increased the number of service/repairs has remained the same at 4.2 times per year. That number took a decline in 2010 to 3.6. This number includes the effect of the 2009 Car Allowance Rebate System program, also known as "Cash for Clunkers", in which approximately 850,000 vehicles were bought and scrapped by the federal government.

=== Sales ===
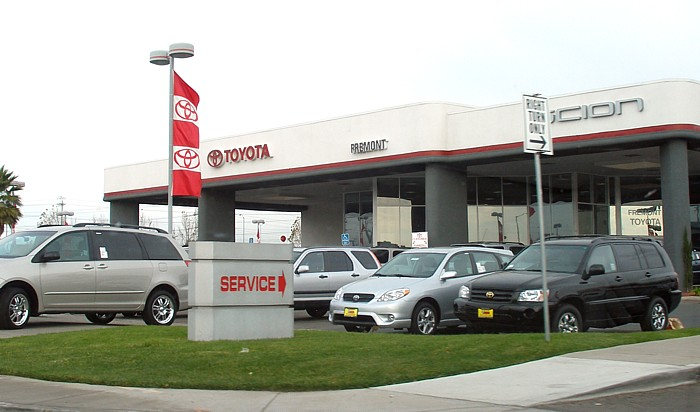
A typical American car dealership in Fremont, California. Between 2002 and 2003, the number of vehicles in the United States increased by three million.

In the year 2009, in the largest decline during economic crisis, fewer than 6 million new passenger cars were sold in the United States, and the total number of new sold and leased cars and light trucks dropped to just above 13 million from a normal pre-crisis level of 20 million. The number of cars sold in the US decreased at a continuous rate since 2000, when 9 million passenger cars were sold in the US. 1985 was a record year with cars sales totaling just over 11 million.

In 2006, the sales of vehicles made in NAFTA states totaled 5.5 million, while the sale of imported vehicles totaled 2.2 million. 923,000 vehicles were imported from Japan, making it the greatest exporter of vehicles to the US. Germany was the second largest exporter of vehicles to the US, with 534,000 units exported to the US in 2006. Imports from all other nations, except Germany and Japan, totaled 729,000.

=== Pricing ===
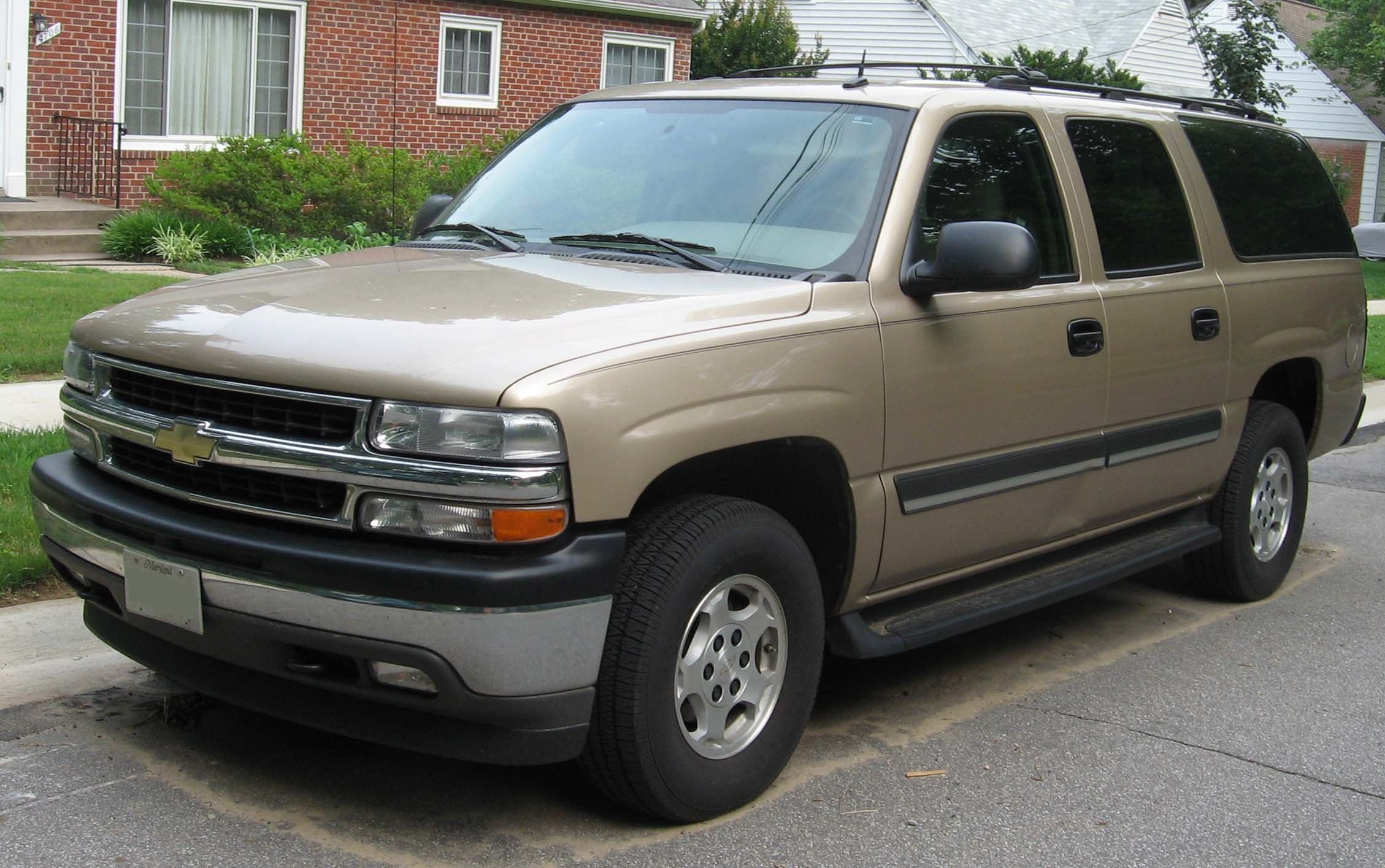
Full-size SUVs such as the Chevrolet Suburban had an average sticker price of $42k, but were sold for an average 22% discount, bringing the net price down to $33k. Overall, large non-luxury SUVs featured the largest discounts in the SUV segment (Edmunds.com).

In July 2004, Edmunds.com published a report stating that the average sticker price on a vehicle sold in the United States was $29,746. However, in the US, passenger vehicles are commonly sold at considerable discounts and customers rarely pay the sticker price or MSRP (Manufacturer's Suggested Retail Price). The discount is commonly determined by the company's marketing strategies and tends to be larger the slower selling a vehicle is. Due to what many American consumers have perceived as a declining quality among the automobiles manufactured by the "Big Three" and large fixed labor and capital costs, discounts tend to be larger on domestic vehicles. In 2003 the average discount on a domestic vehicle was 20.6% below MSRP. For Japanese and Korean vehicles the average discount was 10% and 12.8%. The lowest discounts were given on vehicles from European manufacturers, where the average discount was 7.7% below MSRP.

Overall, the average discount in July 2004 was $4,982 (16.8%), meaning that while the average MSRP was almost $30,000, the average buyer of a new car paid only $24,764. Dr. Jane Liu, the Vice President of Data Analysis for Edmunds.com further stated that, "New models are being introduced at higher price points, but the competitiveness of the market is dramatically pushing down net prices, resulting in a record average discount". The lowest discounts among all car segments were given on luxury SUVs, where buyers received an average 10% discount, resulting in a $43,725 net price, versus the sticker price of $48,586.

=== Fuel economy ===
Following the 1973 oil crisis, however, smaller vehicles, often imported from Japan, became more popular with the American public as these vehicles featured better fuel economy ratings. In 1975, the US government passed minimum fuel economy standards. From the late 1970s, American automobile manufacturers drastically downsized their cars. Only a few vehicles, such as those using the Ford Panther platform retained their original size.

With fuel prices returning to 1960s levels, many American manufacturers again increased the size of their vehicles in the 1990s.

In 2020 the average light-duty automobile, including light trucks, in the US had a fuel economy rating of 23.0 MPG or 10.2 liters per 100 kilometers. The average fuel economy for passenger vehicles in the United States remained stagnant throughout the 1990s and 2000s, peaking in 2001 and 2004. The 90s saw the slowest increase in fuel economy since 1960, with fuel economy increasing from 16.4 MPG in 1990 to 16.9 MPG in 2001. This is in contrast to the 1980s when the average fuel economy improved somewhat more significantly from 13.3 MPG in 1980 to 16.4 MPG in 1990.

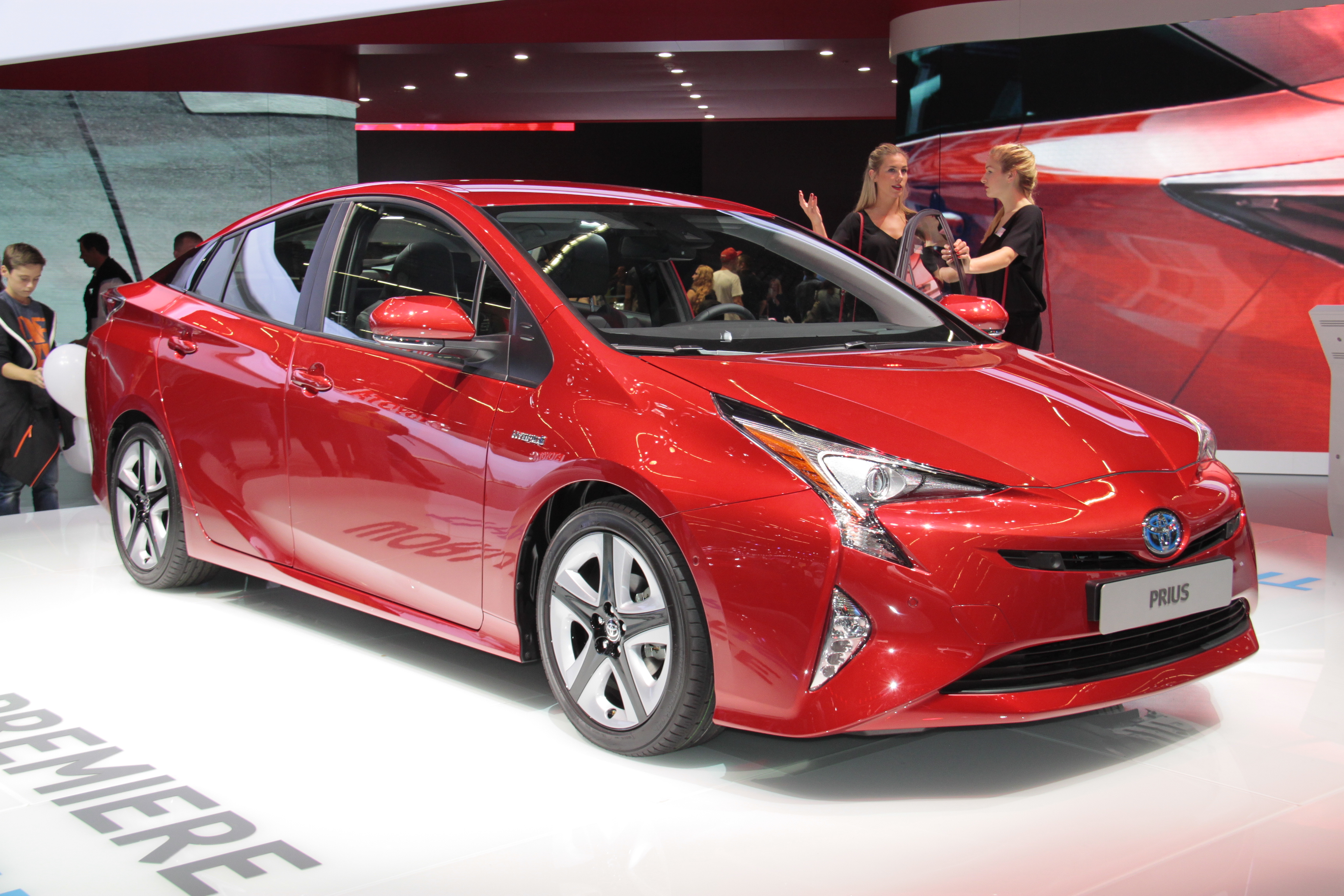
The Toyota Prius Hybrid with Eco Mode features an EPA fuel economy rating of 58 MPG city and 53 highway (4.2L/100 km), the 2nd most fuel efficient non-plug-in vehicle ever sold in the United States.

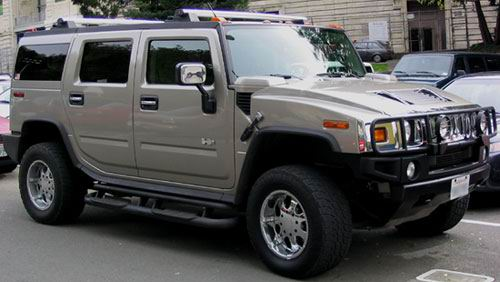
A Hummer H2, popular in the early 2000s but later discontinued, has an estimated fuel economy of 9 miles per gallon, and is often criticized by environmentalist groups for its poor fuel economy.

=== Body style and size ===
Mainstream mid-size sedans such as the Chevrolet Malibu or Ford Fusion are often perceived to be the typical and most common body style in the United States. While mid-size sedans are indeed among the country's best selling vehicles, pick-up trucks held the top positions until mid-2008, rivaling sedans in the terms of total numbers sold. In the year 2006, the best selling models were the Ford F-Series with 796,039 units sold and the Chevrolet Silverado with 636,069 units sold. The Toyota Camry, Dodge Ram, and Honda Accord held the next three positions as the best selling cars. Rising oil prices stripped pick-up trucks of the "best selling vehicle type" title in mid-2008. The Toyota Corolla currently holds the title.

By September 2017 sales of new crossover utility vehicles exceeded the combined sales of traditional cars such as sedans, hatchbacks, and sports cars.

=== VMT ===
Passenger vehicles miles traveled in the United States are included in the VMT statistics.

Americans cars have transported 3,235,752 million Passenger-Miles in the US, in 2006, according to the DoT (against 4,678 billion passenger kilometers in the EU-27).

In the US, car occupancy, is near of 1.7 people per car (against around 1.5 occupant(s) by car in EU).

== Manufacturing ==
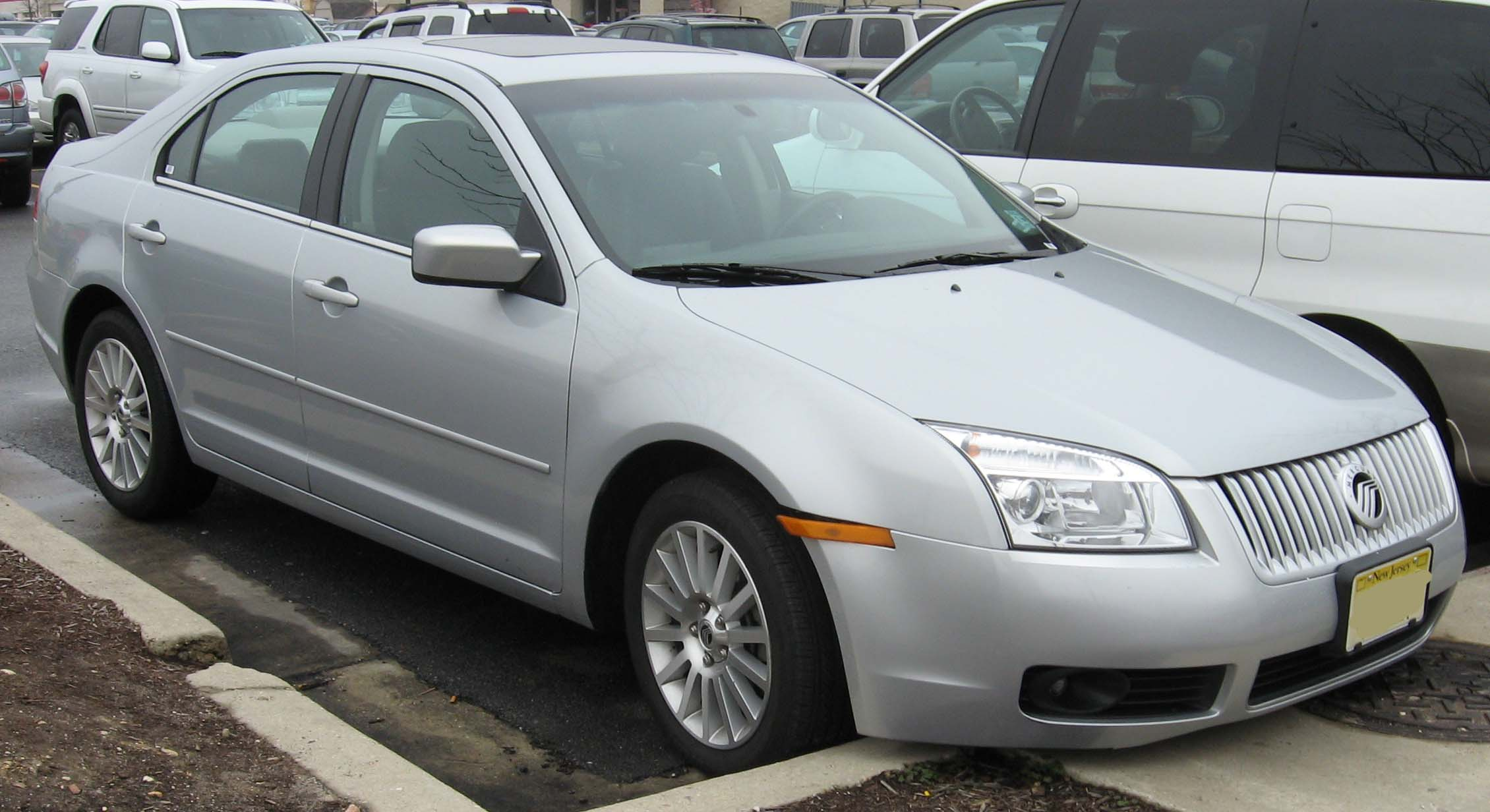
The Mercury Milan, despite being manufactured in Mexico, is still considered a domestic vehicle.

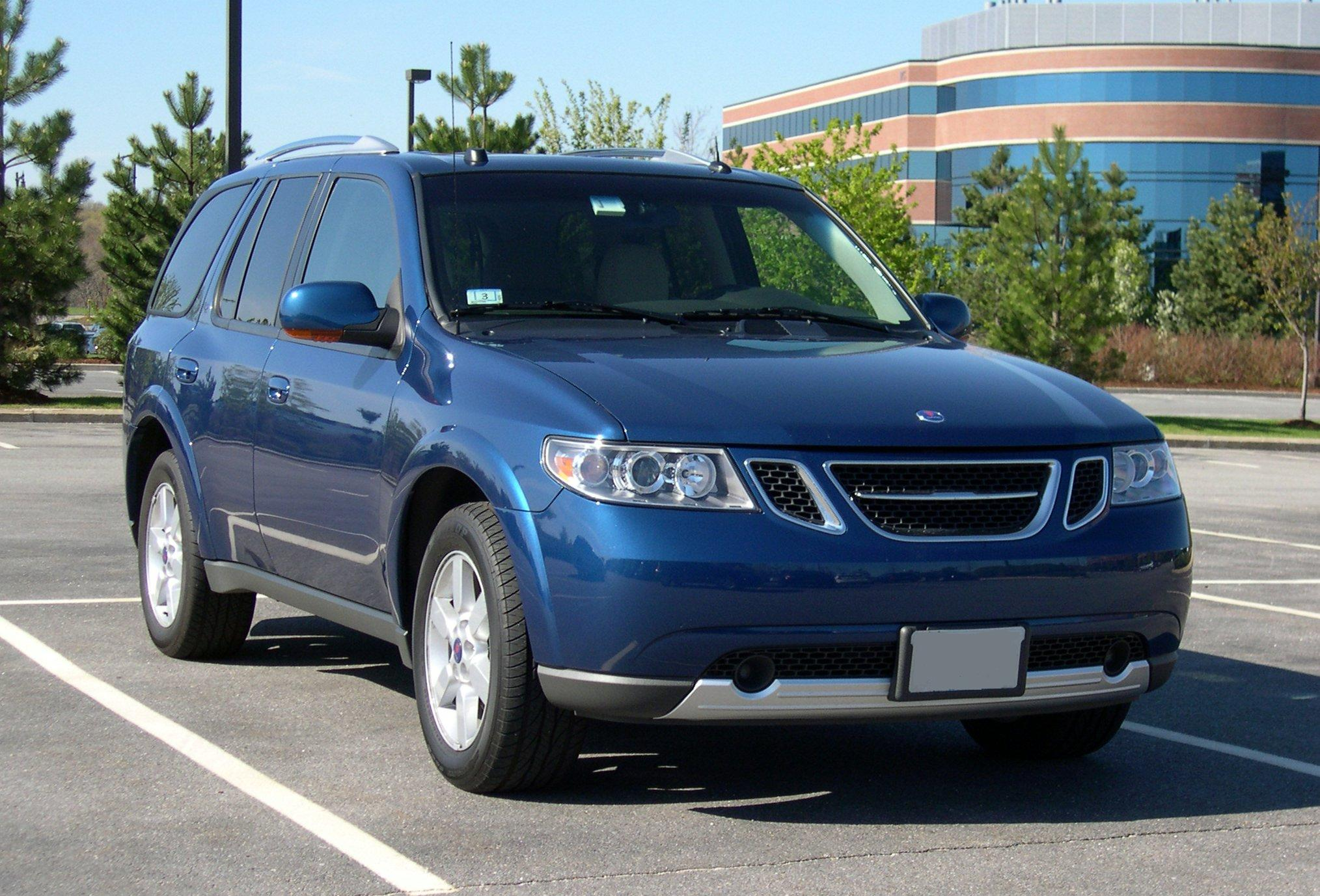
The Saab 9-7X, despite being manufactured in the US by GM, is still considered an import vehicle.

The US was the largest producer of vehicles in the world in 2003, followed by Japan and Germany. While most vehicles sold in the US were manufactured by the Big Three, foreign corporations such as Japan's Toyota Motor Company have started manufacturing in the US and are now an integrated part of the US automobile industry. For example, Toyota Motor Company now operates twelve manufacturing plants in the US, producing 1.55 million vehicles, 61.66% of the roughly 2.5 million vehicles the company sells in the US each year.

A wide variety of vehicles are manufactured in the United States, from compact cars to full-size luxury vehicles. The American automobile industry itself is probably best known for the manufacture of large cars, leading to the common public perception of American cars being larger than those from other countries and making the US well known for the production of so-called land yachts.

=== Domestic vehicles ===
While the denotation of domestic vehicle includes all vehicles made in the United States, the term Domestic vehicle in the United States is usually only applied to vehicles made by the "Big Three", their traditional makes, and Tesla Motors. The term domestic vehicle does not include vehicles sold under makes who used to be headquartered outside the United States and are now owned by the Ford Motor Company or General Motors. Vehicles made outside the US by the traditional makes of the "Big Three" are considered to be domestic vehicles, while vehicles made inside the US by foreign manufacturers are not considered domestic, but rather import vehicles.

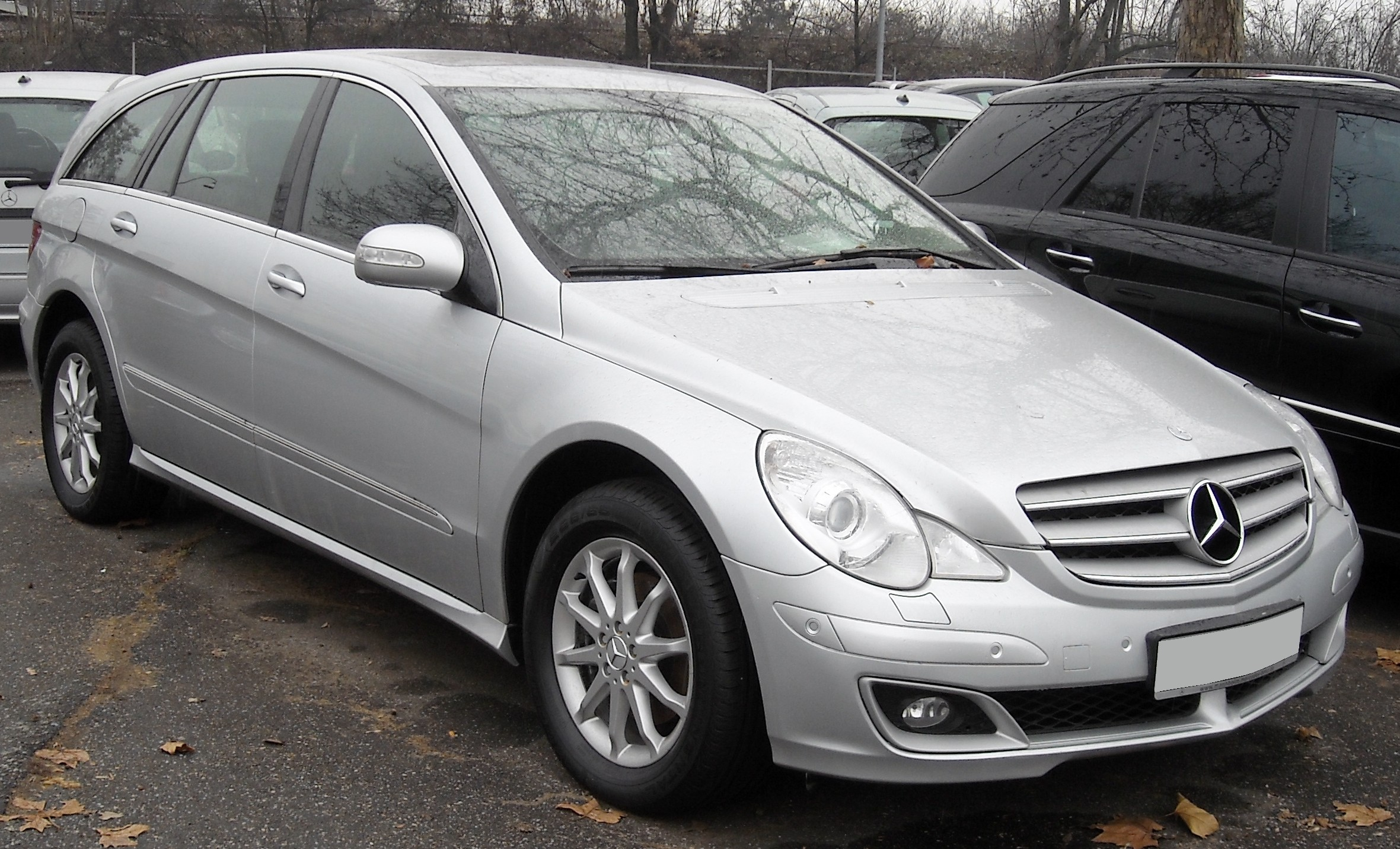
The Mercedes-Benz R-Class is one of many vehicles that is marketed as an import vehicle due to the national origin of its manufacturer, yet is manufactured in the United States.

=== Import vehicles ===
As with the term, domestic vehicles, there is a legal definition for import vehicles but popular usage of the term, and popular views of what constitutes an "import" vehicle, vary widely.

For the purposes of Federal regulations, such as Corporate Average Fuel Economy (CAFE) and the American Automobile Labeling Act of 1994 (AALA), vehicles produced in the United States, regardless of brand, are considered "domestic", while vehicles produced outside the United States are considered "imported".

However, many Americans view a Toyota vehicle made in Kentucky, a Saab built in Ohio, or a Mercedes-Benz vehicle made in Alabama as an "import" (or import make), while others view a Pontiac vehicle made in Australia as a "domestic" vehicle. This perception is due to the respective brands' longstanding association with their parent countries: Toyota with Japan, Mercedes-Benz with Germany, and Pontiac with the United States.

The country of origin of any particular vehicle can be easily determined:

- The AALA requires that passenger vehicles manufactured after October 1, 1994, must have labels specifying their percentage value of U.S./Canadian parts content, the country of assembly, and countries of origin of the engine and transmission. These are typically part of, or adjacent, to the vehicle's Monroney sticker.
- Each vehicle sold in the United States carries a Vehicle Identification Number, as required by NHTSA regulation – Title 49, Part 565 of the U.S. Code.

The VIN identifies the vehicle's country of manufacture, and the company responsible for its production. Vehicles manufactured in the United States have VINs beginning with the numbers 1, 4, and 5 – regardless of where the company is based. If a motor vehicle is manufactured in Canada, the VIN begins with the number 2. Thus, a Toyota Camry made in the U.S. will have a 1, 4, or 5 at the start of its VIN, while one imported from Japan will begin with the letter J.

In the year 2000, according to an article in the magazine Motor, BMW attempted to label its "X5" Sport utility vehicle, made in Spartanburg, South Carolina with a VIN beginning with the letter W – indicating the vehicle was made in Germany. A spokesman for the Society of Automotive Engineers, the agency responsible for assigning the three-digit "World Manufacturer Identifier" that begins the VIN label, was quoted as saying "We assign (codes) according to the dirt the plant's built on, not the headquarters of the company".

=== Big Three ===
"The Big Three" refers to the three largest automobile manufacturers headquartered in the United States. While there have been roughly 1,800 car manufacturers in the US over the course of the 20th century, only three large corporations with considerable sales numbers were left by the 1980s. The term is applied to General Motors, the Ford Motor Company, and FCA US.

==== General Motors ====
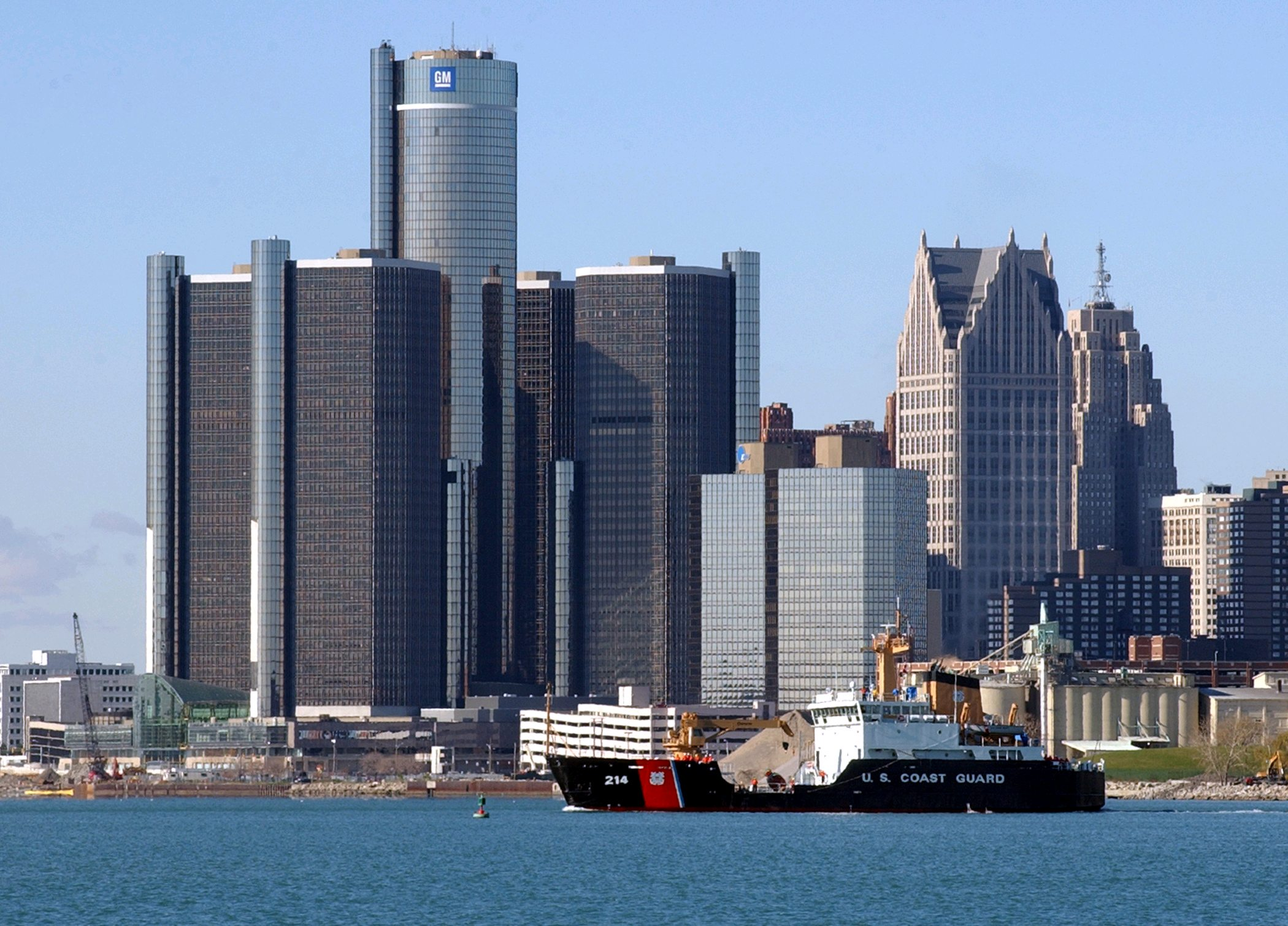
The Renaissance Center in downtown Detroit serves as the global headquarters of General Motors.

General Motors is the largest automobile manufacturer in the United States and was also the world's largest for 77 years. However, in 2008, GM was passed by Toyota. GM is headquartered at the Renaissance Center in downtown Detroit, employs approximately 216,000 people, sold 9.025 million cars worldwide, and had a US$152.35 billion revenue for the year 2015. The corporation sells its vehicles in the United States under the following divisions and subsidiaries:

- Buick
- Cadillac
- Chevrolet
- GMC
- Hummer, defunct as of 2010
- Pontiac defunct as of 2010
- Saturn Corporation defunct as of 2010–11
- Oldsmobile defunct as of 2004

==== Ford Motor Company ====
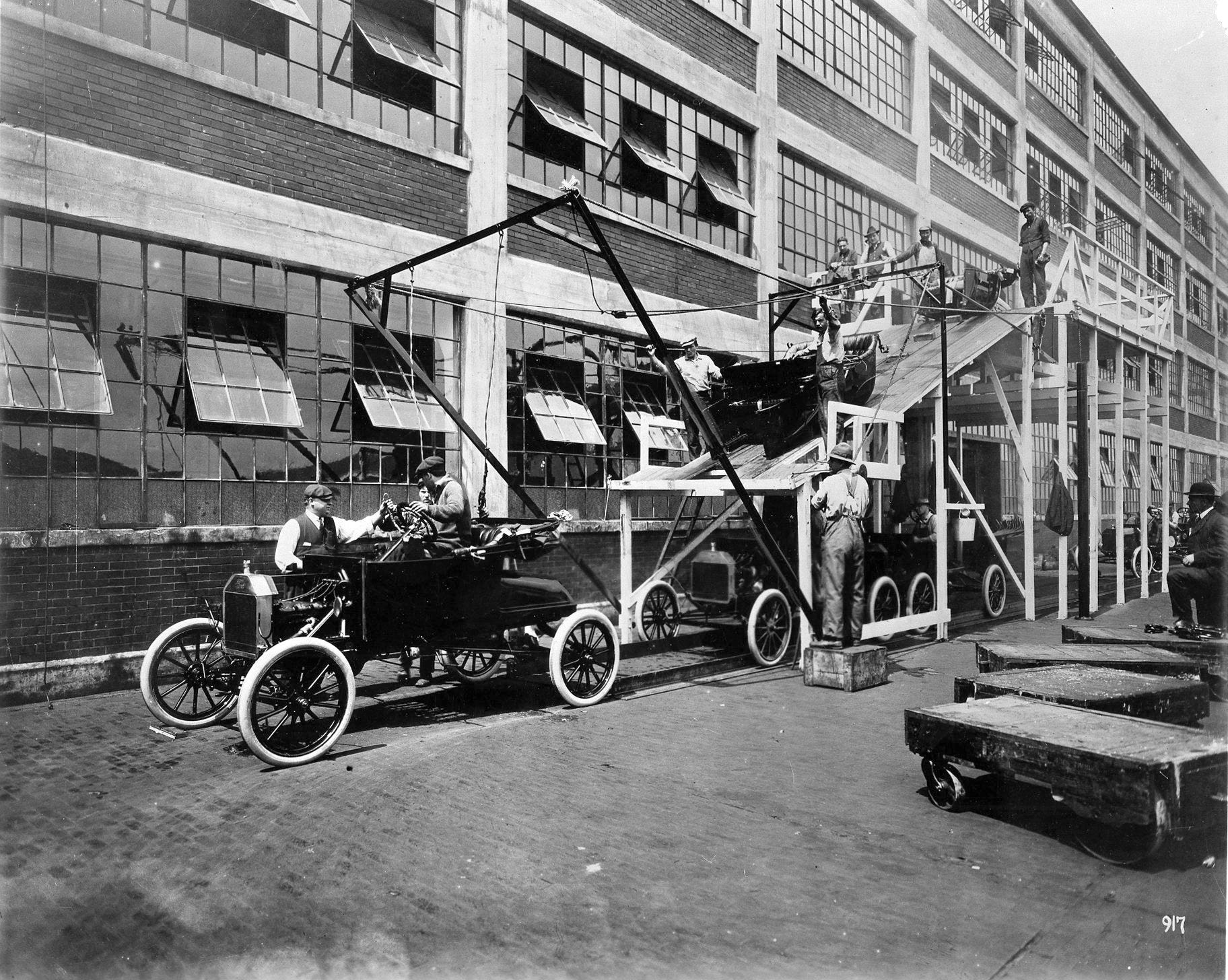
A Ford assembly line in 1913, ten years after the company was founded in 1903

The Ford Motor Company (FoMoCo) was founded in 1903 by Henry Ford, and is America's second largest and the world's fifth largest vehicle manufacturer according to total sales volume. In 2015, the Ford Motor Company had a total revenue of $149.5 billion and 199,000 employees worldwide. The corporation sells vehicles under the following brand names and subsidiaries:

- Ford Motor Company
- Lincoln
- Mercury defunct as of 2011

==== Chrysler ====
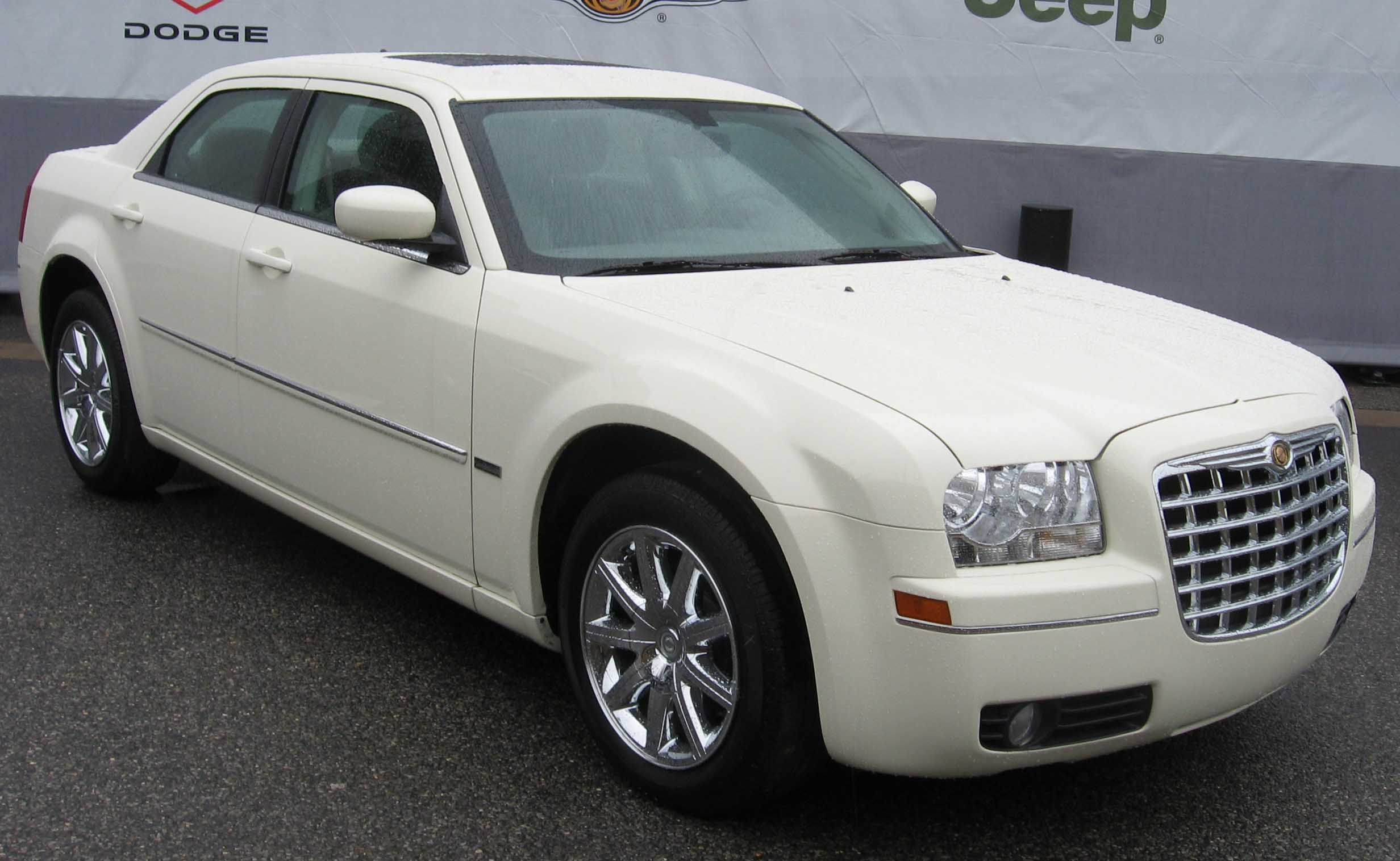
The Chrysler 300 has become one of the best selling American upscale sedans and has contributed to the Chrysler brand's revival, according to many critics.

Founded in 1925 by Walter Percy Chrysler, the Chrysler Corporation has since been one of the most important American automobile manufacturers, consistently ranking as the third-largest for most of the post-war period. The company followed GM's "move up" model, with the Chrysler brand (and the Imperial brand from 1955 to 1975) being the flagship luxury make.

In 1998, the Chrysler Corporation officially merged with Daimler-Benz of Germany, into a new entity, DaimlerChrysler (DCX), which is headquartered both in Stuttgart, Germany and Auburn Hills, Michigan (where the pre-merger headquarters of DaimlerBenz and Chrysler, respectively, were located). This raised a dispute on whether Chrysler (or, more specifically, the Chrysler Group within DCX, which consists of most former Chrysler Corporation operations and is headquartered in Auburn Hills) can still be seen as a domestic manufacturer. Nevertheless, the term "Big Three" still applied.

In 2005, the Chrysler Group employed 83,130 people and sold 2.83 million vehicles globally, generating $57.4 billion in revenue.

Chrysler entered into bankruptcy in 2008, and was then owned by the Italian car maker FIAT and the United Auto Workers Union.

With the merger of Chrysler and Fiat in 2014, the new company's name became Fiat Chrysler Automobiles (FCA) (operating in USA as FCA US LLC) in December 2014. FCA in turn merged on January 16, 2020, with French based PSA Group to form a new entity called Stellantis.

As US-american brands, Fiat Chrysler and now Stellantis manufactures and sells vehicles under the following brands:

- Chrysler
- Dodge
- Jeep (acquired in 1987 after Chrysler absorbed American Motors' business assets from its parent owner Renault)
- Ram Trucks (formerly Dodge Truck Division)

SRT was consolidated back into Dodge in 2014, and used as a sub-brand.

The company also imports and sells European Stellantis (former FCA) brands: Alfa Romeo and Fiat (Maserati USA is a separate company).

Brands owned by Chrysler resp. FCA resp. Stellantis, but no longer used in current production of new vehicles are:

- DeSoto defunct 1961
- Imperial defunct 1975
- Plymouth defunct in 2001
- AMC defunct in 1987 (remaining stock purchased by Chrysler Corporation from Renault)
- Eagle defunct in 1998 (was established as the successor to American Motors)

=== Other automakers with manufacturing operations in the United States ===
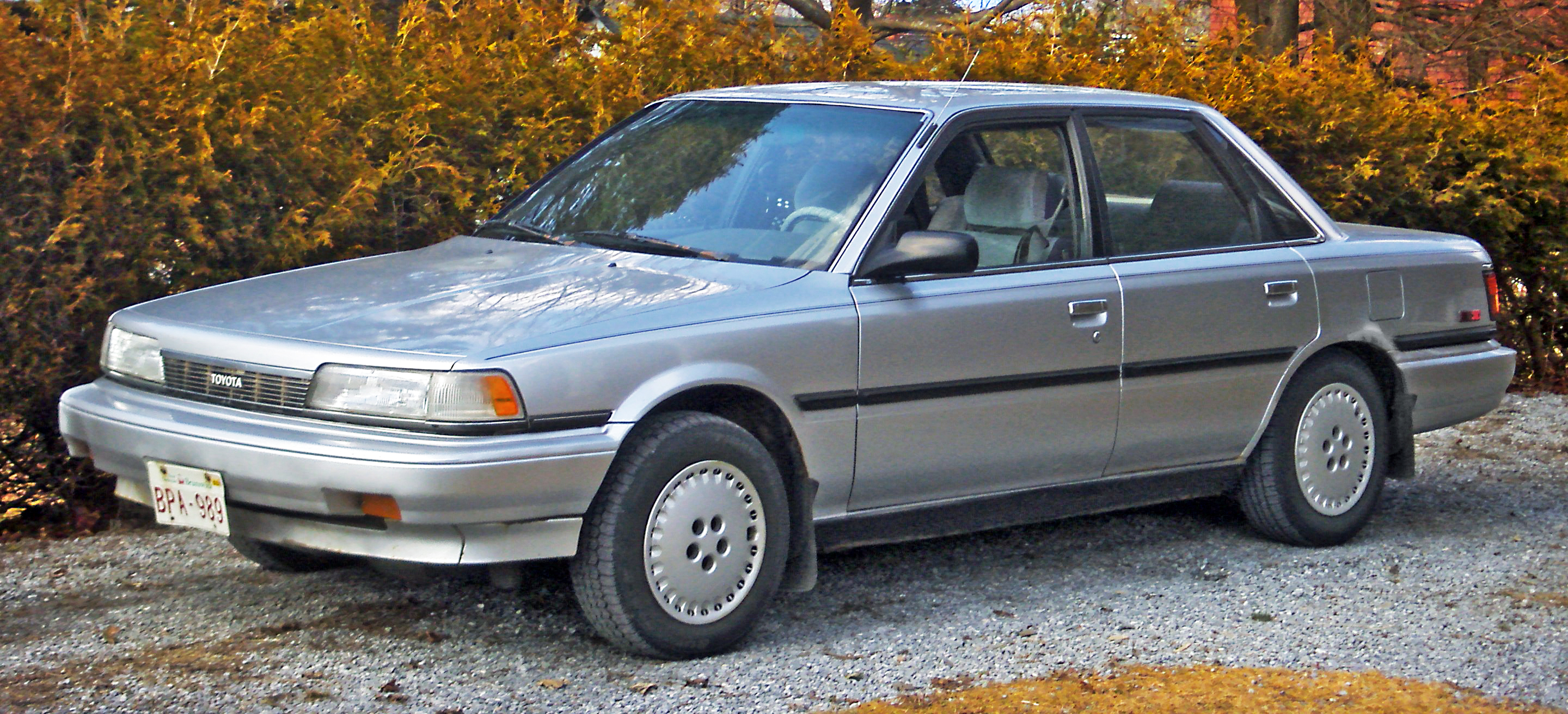
The best-selling passenger car in the United States is not one from the Big Three, but the Toyota Camry, although it is also manufactured in the US.

==== BMW ====
See BMW for a complete overview of the corporation

BMW opened its American manufacturing plant in Spartanburg, South Carolina in 1994, to manufacture the Z3 roadster, later replaced by the Z4 model. Since 2000, the plant also manufactures the X3, X5 and X6 SUV. All those models are made exclusively at Spartanburg for both the domestic market and worldwide exports (not counting CKD operations in some countries).

==== Honda ====
See Honda for a complete overview of the corporation

Honda was the first Japanese automaker to build a factory in the United States. Following the success of the Civic and Accord, the company opened a new plant in Marysville, Ohio in 1982 to assemble the model, which went on to become the most popular car in the US in 1989. Honda expanded their operations and the scope of models manufactured in the US, building the Anna engine plant and East Liberty automobile assembly plant, and in 2001 opening Honda Manufacturing of Alabama in Lincoln. Most models sold under the Honda and Acura brands in North America are currently manufactured in either the U.S. or Canada.

Others, such as the Honda Fit, Honda S2000, Acura TSX, and Acura RL, were imported from Japan. Some vehicles, such as the older CR-V (in the eastern United States) and the Civic SI hatchback, were imported from the UK. Some Accord passenger cars were imported from Mexico and starting from 2008 all CR-Vs sold in the Americas are made in Mexico. In 2009, production of 4-door Civic sedans began at a new factory in Greensburg, Indiana.

==== Hyundai ====
See Hyundai Motor Manufacturing Alabama for more detailed description

Hyundai Motor Company started manufacturing in the United States in 2005, when their plant in Montgomery, Alabama started the production of the Sonata sedan. It was joined in 2006 by the new Santa Fe SUV.

==== Kia Motors ====
See Kia Motors for more detailed description

Kia Motor Company, partially owned by Hyundai, has built a manufacturing plant in West Point, Georgia, which produces the Optima sedan and the Kia Sorento SUV.

==== Mazda ====
See AutoAlliance International for more detailed description

The last Mazda 6 rolled off the line on Friday, August 24, 2012, with Mazda discontinuing production on American soil, effectively ending the 20-year joint-venture between Mazda and Ford. Mazda moved production of the Mazda 6 back to Japan and opened a factory in Salamanca, Mexico, which builds the Toyota Yaris iA and Mazda 3 subcompact and compact cars.

On Wednesday, January 26, 2022, Mazda Toyota Manufacturing USA, a joint venture with Toyota, started production of the CX-50 crossover in Huntsville, Alabama.

==== Mercedes-Benz ====
See Mercedes-Benz U.S. International for more detailed description

In 1997, a year before the merger of Damiler-Benz and Chrysler, the former Daimler-Benz followed the steps of their Bavarian competitor and opened a plant in Tuscaloosa County, Alabama, to serve as a worldwide production location for the new M-Class. The M-Class has since then been replaced by a new generation and joined by the new R-Class and GL-Class, also manufactured exclusively in Alabama.

==== Nissan ====
See Nissan Motors for a complete overview of the corporation

Nissan opened their first factory in the 1980s in Smyrna, Tennessee, joined in the new millennium by another plant in Canton, Mississippi. Most models sold under the Nissan brand in United States, as well as Infiniti QX56, are currently manufactured there. Unlike Toyota or Honda, the company does not have any manufacturing operations in Canada. However, Nissan maintains manufacturing operations in Mexico, from which its smaller U.S.-market cars like the Sentra are imported. Most North American models are specific to this market, although some models, like the Murano and Quest, are exported to other continents.

==== Lucid Motors ====
See Lucid Motors for a more for a more detailed description

American car company Lucid based in Newark, California manufactures its luxury electric sedan the Air in Casa Grande, Arizona. With a EPA certified range of 516 miles it became the first electric vehicle in the world to achieve a range of over 500 miles.

==== Subaru ====
See Subaru of Indiana Automotive, Inc. for more detailed description

Subaru teamed up with fellow Japanese manufacturer Isuzu, forming a joint-venture called Subaru Isuzu Automotive to build and operate a manufacturing plant in Lafayette, Indiana. The plant made Subaru cars and Isuzu SUVs mostly for the American market until 2003, when Isuzu, facing faltering sales in America, decided to quit the venture selling their share to Subaru for $1 million. The plant continued to build Isuzu Rodeos under contract until the end of that vehicle's production run. From then on, the production was limited to Subaru models such as Legacy and its derivatives Outback and Baja, as well as the new B9 Tribeca. The two latter models are only built in Indiana for all markets where they are sold. After Toyota acquired a stake in Fuji Heavy Industries, the parent company of Subaru, it shifted some of the Toyota Camry production to the Lafayette plant.

==== Tesla Motors ====
See Tesla for more detailed description

Tesla is an American company based in Texas (originally based in Silicon Valley) that designs, manufactures and sells electric vehicles and, through its subsidiary SolarCity, solar power energy systems.

Tesla Motors gained widespread attention by producing the Tesla Roadster (2008), the first fully electric sports car, followed by other premium electric vehicles such as the Model S (2012) sedan, Model X (2015) SUV and Model 3 (2017).

==== Toyota Motor Corporation ====
See Toyota Motor Engineering & Manufacturing North America for more detailed description

Toyota's first foray into automobile manufacturing in the United States was NUMMI, a joint venture with General Motors based on the latter's production facility in California, which started in 1984 and has been manufacturing Toyota models and their versions branded as Geo, Chevrolet and Pontiac until GM withdrew in August 2009 and Toyota shut the doors in March 2010. Toyota went on to establish a number of wholly owned plants in states such as Kentucky, Indiana, California, Texas, West Virginia and Alabama. More than half of Toyota-branded vehicles sold in the United States come from American plants. Conversely, all Scions were imported from Japan or Mexico (iA only). Many Lexus-branded models are imported from Japan or Canada (RX only). Some are assembled in Lexington, Kentucky (ES only).

==== Volkswagen ====
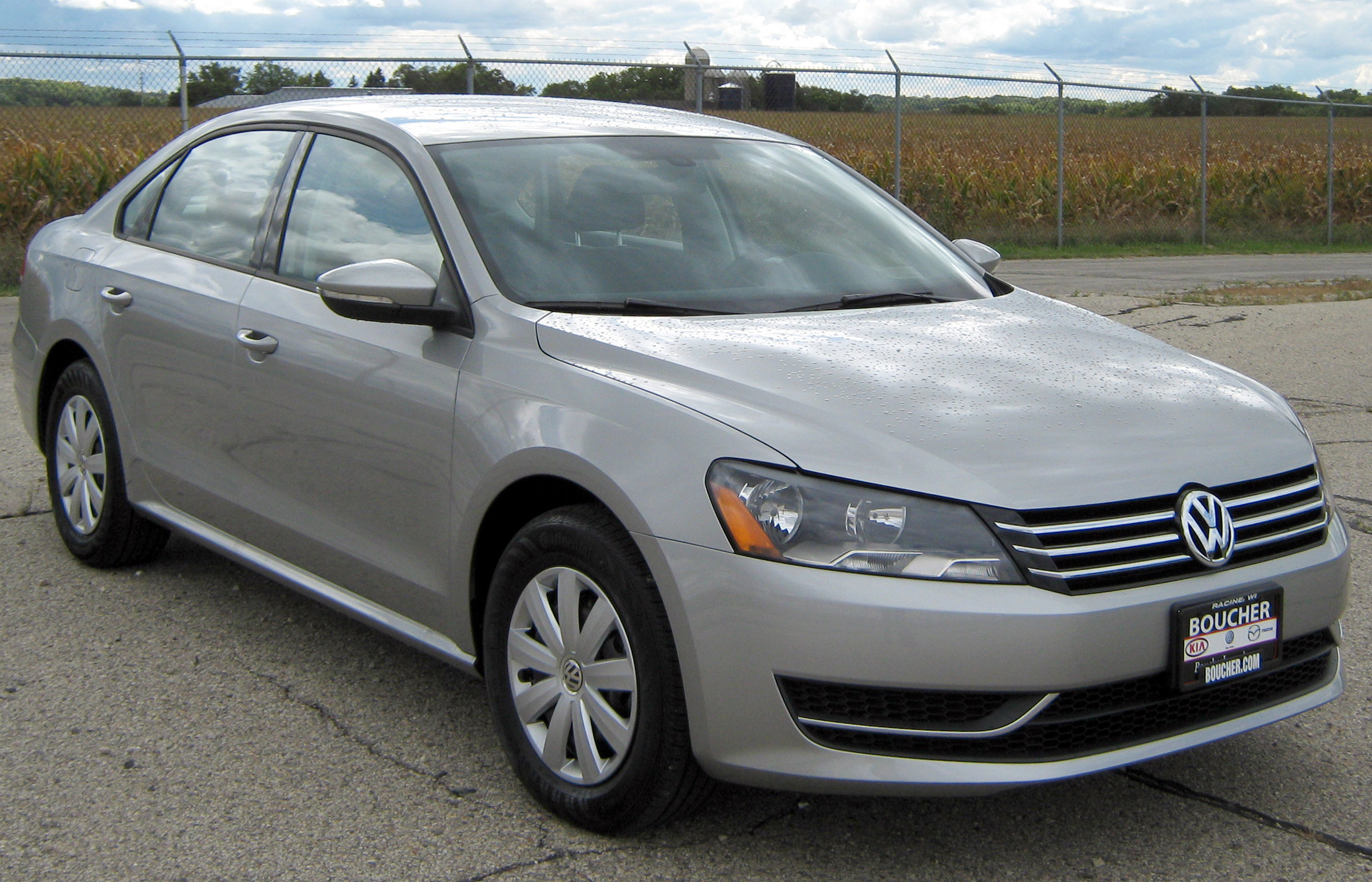
The Volkswagen Passat is named the 2012 Motor Trend Car of the Year.

See Volkswagen Group of America for more detailed description

During the late 1970s, Volkswagen of America commenced production of the MkI Golf (sold in the US as the Rabbit including its utility variant (marketed in Europe as the Caddy and the US and the Rabbit Sportruck) at its Westmoreland, Pennsylvania assembly plant until the plant ceased operations in the early 1980s. North American production after the Westmoreland closure was shifted to VW's Puebla, Mexico factory. The 2012 Volkswagen Passat is a mid-sized sedan which replaces the previous-generation Passat B6 in the North American market. The model was also shipped overseas to South Korea. The Passat NMS was officially announced in January 2011 at the Detroit Auto Show. Built at the Volkswagen Chattanooga Assembly Plant, the new Passat allows building and shipping costs to be reduced significantly over its predecessor making it more competitive to offerings from competitors at the $20K mark.

==== Volvo ====
See Volvo Cars for a complete overview of the corporation

Volvo Cars opened its first assembly plant in the United States, in Ridgeville, South Carolina. Assembly of Volvo S60s commenced there in September 2018.

== Domestic makes – Big Three ==
These makes from the Big Three are currently marketed in the U.S.

- Buick
- Cadillac
- Chevrolet
- Chrysler
- Dodge
- Ford
- GMC
- Jeep
- Lincoln
- Ram

== Domestic makes – non-Big Three ==
- Equus
- Fisker
- Karma
- Lucid
- Panoz
- Rezvani
- Rivian
- Tesla
- Saleen

== Import makes, with some assembly in the U.S. ==
Some passenger vehicles from the following import makes are currently assembled in the U.S.

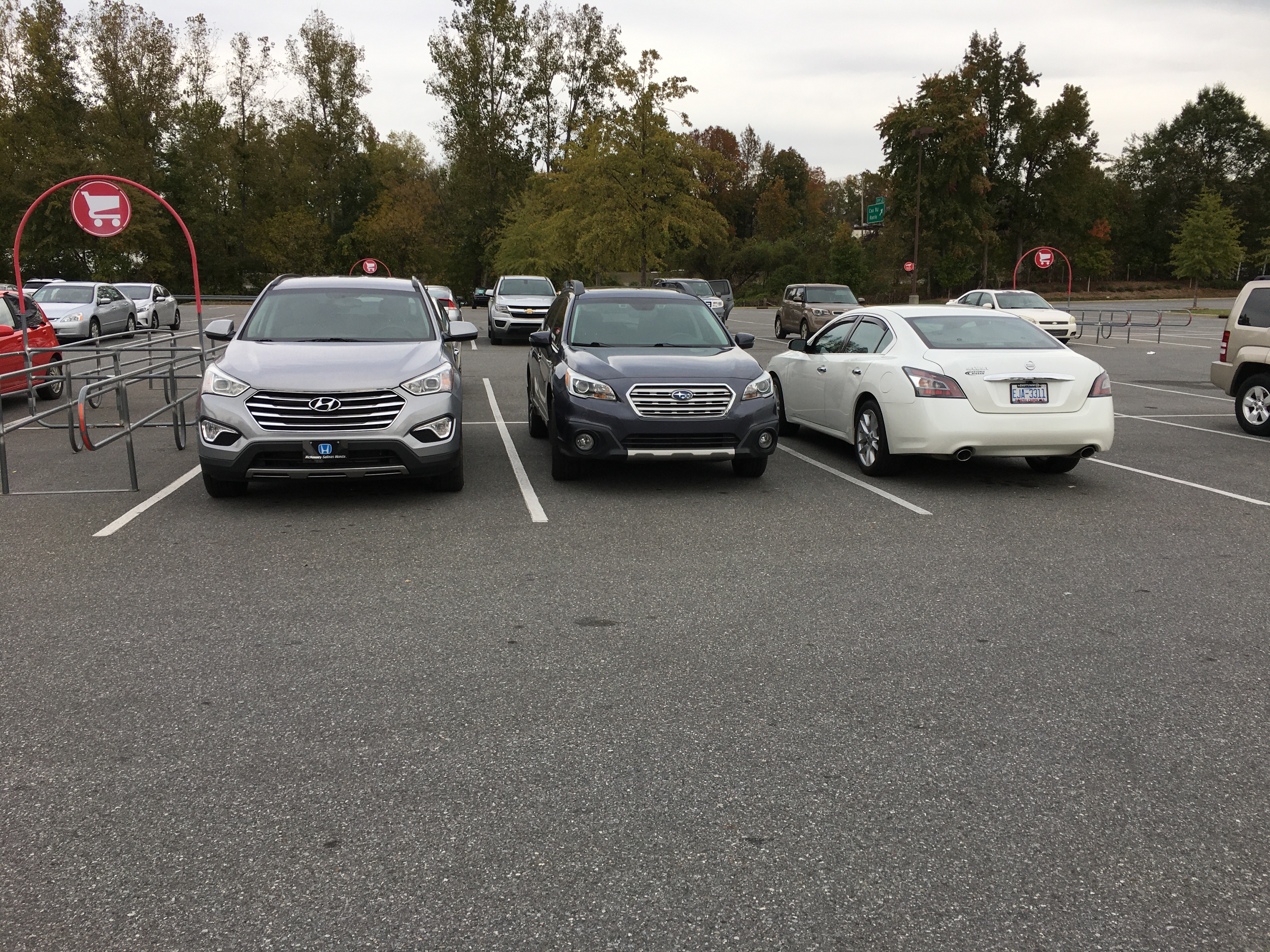
Non-American branded cars in America

- Acura
- BMW
- Honda
- Hyundai
- Infiniti
- Kia
- Lexus
- Mazda
- Mercedes-Benz
- Nissan
- Subaru
- Toyota
- Volkswagen
- Volvo

== Import-only makes ==
The following makes are currently imported to the U.S., and not assembled domestically.

- Alfa Romeo
- Aston Martin
- Audi
- Bentley
- Bugatti
- Caterham
- Ferrari
- Fiat
- Genesis
- Jaguar
- Koenigsegg
- Lamborghini
- Land Rover
- Lotus
- Maserati
- McLaren
- Mini
- Mitsubishi (previously assembled in the U.S.)
- Morgan
- Pagani
- Polestar
- Porsche
- Rolls-Royce
- Smart

== Safety ==
Safety of people using passenger vehicles is one topic of transportation safety in the United States.

== See also ==
- Automotive industry
- World Forum for Harmonization of Vehicle Regulations
- Fiat Chrysler Automobiles
- List of U.S. cars
