= Institute of Public Administration =

Institute of Public Administration may refer to:

- Institute of Public Administration Australia
- Indian Institute of Public Administration
- Institute of Public Administration (Ireland)
- National Institute of Public Administration (Malaysia)
- Institute of Public Administration, Campus The Hague, University of Leiden, Netherlands
- Institute of Public Administration New Zealand
- National Institute of Public Administration (Pakistan)
- HCM Rajasthan State Institute of Public Administration
- Korea Institute of Public Administration (South Korea)
- National Institute of Public Administration (Spain)
- National Institute of Public Administration (Damascus)
- Royal Institute of Public Administration, UK

== See also ==
- Academy of Public Administration (disambiguation)
- Civil Service College (disambiguation)
- IPA (disambiguation)
- State Institute of Public Administration and Rural Development, Agartala, Tripura, India
