= Ian R. Gordon =

British geographer and political economist (born 1944)

Ian Richard Gordon FAcSS
- Born: 1944 (age 81–82); United Kingdom
- Citizenship: British
- Occupations: Geographer; political economist
- Employer: London School of Economics and Political Science
- Known for: Urban and regional development; spatial labour markets; migration; metropolitan governance
- Awards: Fellow of the Academy of Social Sciences (2002)

Academic background
- Education: Magdalen College, Oxford

Ian Richard Gordon (born 1944) is a British geographer and political economist. He is Emeritus Professor of Human Geography in the Department of Geography and Environment at the London School of Economics and Political Science (LSE). His research focuses on urban and regional development, spatial labour markets, migration with emphasis on London and the wider South East of England.

== Education ==
Gordon read Philosophy, Politics and Economics at Magdalen College, University of Oxford, graduating with a first-class BA in 1965. He completed the full Assistant Principal course at the Civil Service College in 1970.

== Career ==
Gordon began his career in the UK civil service as a research officer for the South West Economic Planning Board and Council in Bristol from 1965 to 1973. In 1971, he was seconded to the University of Kent at Canterbury as a research fellow in economics, later becoming a lecturer in interdisciplinary studies. He was promoted to senior lecturer in 1978 and reader in regional studies in 1984, directing an urban and regional studies unit from 1974 until he left the university.

In 1989, he was appointed professor of geography at the University of Reading, serving as head of department from 1990 to 1994. He moved to the London School of Economics in 2000 as professor of human geography, was director of the LSE London research group from 2002 to 2004, and became emeritus professor in 2013.

Gordon was a member of Mayor Boris Johnson's Outer London Commission from 2009 to 2016. The Commission was created to ensure that Outer London was represented in the Mayor's policies and to examine ways of stimulating investment in suburban centres. Gordon contributed to three final reports that argued for radical changes to the London Plan to meet housing targets.

== Research ==
Gordon's research focuses on how large cities function as hubs for innovative clusters and as "escalators" for human capital acquisition and career progression. His 2015 paper in Regional Studies examined how London drives occupational advancement. Work with Tony Champion and others found that second-order English cities – including Birmingham, Manchester, Leeds, Newcastle, Bristol, Sheffield, Liverpool, Nottingham, and Leicester – increasingly lose out to London due to its stronger agglomeration economies. Later research with Champion examined how London's escalator role has changed over time amid declining internal migration.

Since the 1970s, Gordon has published extensively on international and internal migration in the UK, including analyses of housing and employment streams and the relationship between migration, employment, and unemployment. His 1982 paper developed multi-stream modelling approaches to motivation-specific migration flows. He also co-edited European Factor Mobility (1989) on labour and capital flows within the European Community.

Gordon has written on London's governance challenges, including planning in what he terms "the ungovernable city", the role of the Green Belt, and obstacles to strategic planning. He played a lead role in three collaborative projects; The London Employment Problem (1986), Divided Cities (1992), and Working Capital (2002). He examined economic, social, and political processes in London. With Tony Champion, he has argued for a more negotiated, politically aware model of strategic regional planning.

== Awards ==
Gordon was elected a Fellow of the Academy of Social Sciences (FAcSS) in 2002.

== Selected publications ==
- Gordon, Ian R. (1975). "Employment and housing streams in British inter-regional migration". Scottish Journal of Political Economy. 22 (2): 161–177. doi:10.1111/j.1467-9485.1975.tb00298.x.
- Gordon, Ian R. (1982). "The analysis of motivation-specific migration streams". Environment and Planning A. 14 (1): 5–20. doi:10.1068/a140005.
- Gordon, Ian R.; McCann, Philip (2000). "Industrial clusters: complexes, agglomerations and/or social networks?". Urban Studies. 37 (3): 513–532. doi:10.1080/0042098002096.
- Gordon, Ian R.; McCann, Philip (2005). "Innovation, agglomeration, and regional development". Journal of Economic Geography. 5 (5): 523–543. doi:10.1093/jeg/lbh072.
- Gordon, Ian R. (2015). "Ambition, human capital acquisition and the metropolitan escalator". Regional Studies. 49 (6): 1042–1055. doi:10.1080/00343404.2013.799767.
