= Academy of Public Administration =

Academy of Public Administration or National Academy of Public Administration may refer to:

- Academy of Public Administration (Belarus)
- Academy of Public Administration (Azerbaijan)
- Lal Bahadur Shastri National Academy of Administration, India
- National Academy of Public Administration (United States)
- National Academy of Public Administration (Vietnam)
- North-West Academy of Public Administration, Russia
- Russian Presidential Academy of National Economy and Public Administration

== See also ==
- Civil Service College (disambiguation)
- Institute of Public Administration (disambiguation)
