= Professional Tool & Equipment News =

- Editor: Sara Scullin
- Managing Editor: David Brierley
- Categories: Automotive Magazine
- Frequency: 10 times per year
- Circulation: 105,000
- Founder: Rudy Wolf
- Founded: 1990
- Company: Endeavor Business Media
- Country: United States
- Based in: Fort Atkinson, Wisconsin
- Language: English
- Website: www.pten.com
- ISSN: 1081-4485

Professional Tool & Equipment News (PTEN) is a tool and equipment magazine for automotive repair technicians, shop owners, repair shop managers, mechanics, shop foreman and estimators.

== Overview ==
PTEN was started in 1990. The magazine was started as a bimonthly publication and was established by Rudy Wolf. The catalog-style magazine covers new tools and equipment in auto repair through new product releases, tool reviews and literature guides. PTEN is issued 10 times per year. The magazine is part of Endeavor Business Media. The headquarters of the magazine is in Fort Atkinson, Wisconsin.

The magazine has an audited circulation of approximately 105,000 automotive aftermarket repair professionals.
