= Civil Service College (Hong Kong) =

Hong Kong civil service training institution

- 公務員學院
- Emblem of Hong Kong

Department overview
- Formed: 9 December 2021
- Preceding Department: Civil Service Training & Development Institute
- Jurisdiction: Government of Hong Kong
- Headquarters: 3/F to 5/F, North Point Government Offices, 333 Java Road, North Point, Hong Kong
- Minister responsible: Oscar Kwok Yam-shu, Head of CSC
- Deputy Minister responsible: Vacant, Deputy Head^{SPTO}
- Department executives: Janice Tam Wing-kwan & Wendy Dan Wai-chung, Principal Training Officer; Fiona Chan Siu-ling & Louise Lo Fung-ling, Assistant Principal Training Officer; Emily Ng Wai-ching, Principal Executive Officer
- Parent department: Civil Service Training Advisory Board
- Parent Department: Civil Service Bureau
- Child agencies: School of Professional Development; School of Public Sector Leadership; Centre for Research and Development; Corporate Services Office
- Key document: Civil Service Code
- Website: www.csc.gov.hk

Footnotes
- SPTO: Senior Principal Training Officer

The Civil Service College (CSC, Chinese: 公務員學院) is a Hong Kong civil service training institution established by the Hong Kong Government. It was established on December 9, 2021. The main purpose of establishing the CSC is to educate Hong Kong civil servants to understand the Constitution of China, Hong Kong National Security Law, Hong Kong Basic Law and the spirit of "one country, two systems", to ensure that civil servants are patriots who govern Hong Kong. The final goal is to implement the Chinese Communist Party (CCP)'s spirit of "patriots governing Hong Kong" pointed out by CCP general secretary Xi Jinping.

== History ==
The Civil Service Bureau (CSB) originally had a Civil Service Training & Development Institute (CSTDI), which was responsible for civil servant training. Chief Executive Carrie Lam released her first policy address in 2017, which mentioned the establishment of a brand new Civil Service College. In the policy address the following year, it was mentioned again that the college building will be located in Kwun Tong District, which is expected to be opened in 2026. The CSB established the Civil Service Training Advisory Board led by businessman Victor Fung in 2019 to prepare for the construction of a new Civil Service College. Chief Secretary for Administration Matthew Cheung stated in an interview with Shenzhen Satellite TV in 2020 that the CSC completed in the future can be like the CCP Central Party School. In 2021, the Hong Kong government plans to establish the CSC within this year and upgrade the facilities of the CSTDI in the North Point Government Offices as the temporary site of the college.

== Organization ==
Civil Service College
Head of CSC
Deputy Head
Senior Principal Training Officer
School of Professional Development	School of Public Sector Leadership	Centre for Research and Development	Corporate Services Office
Director	Director
Principal Training Officer	Principal Training Officer
Assistant Director	Director	Executive Manager
Assistant Principal Training Officer	Assistant Principal Training Officer	Principal Executive Officer
Foundation Training	Continuous Development	Research and Collaboration	Business Development	Finance and Procurement

== List of heads ==
- Oscar Kwok Yam-shu, Chinese: 郭蔭庶 (5 July 2022 - incumbent)

== See also ==
- Central Party School
  - National Academy of Governance
