= School of Senior Civil Service =

School of Senior Lever of the State Service
- Школа вищого корпусу державної служби

Agency overview
- Formed: 27 October 2008
- Jurisdiction: Government of Ukraine
- Headquarters: Kyiv
- Employees: 21
- Agency executives: Tetyana Kovtun, Director; Volodymyr Buyalsky, Deputy Director; Olha Horunenko, Deputy Director
- Parent agency: Main Department of the Civil Service of Ukraine
- Website: http://www.school.gov.ua

School of Senior Lever of the State Service (Ukrainian: Школа вищого корпусу державної служби) was established in October 2008 to promote the formation and development of senior civil service and also provide support for public management reform. The School has been created under the auspice of the Main Department of Civil Service of Ukraine.

== Outputs ==
The Management Development Programme is one of the School's earliest pilot outputs. It was drafted in cooperation with European partners after a thorough analysis of senior servants' training needs had been undertaken. The Programme includes a series of short training sessions, which take place in October, November and December 2009. It covers the following topics:

- Change management in public sector
- The art of communication in public management
- Strategic management
- Management
- Leadership
- Human Resource Management (HRM)

== Information Resource Centre ==
The Information Resource Centre seeks to provide trainees of the School of Senior Civil Service with necessary information and meet their intellectual needs to ensure better understanding of various ideas that are given rise to during training. A collection of books, electronic resources and professional support from a librarian are at trainees' disposal.

The Information Resource Centre of the School of Senior Civil Service contains around 1,500 books, scientific works, training cases, and leading periodicals. It provides authorized School trainees with the access to electronic archives and training materials.

== Partners ==
The School cooperates with schools of public administration, in particular the Dutch Institute for Public Administration (ROI), the Danish School of Public Administration (DSPA), the Bavarian Administration School (BVS), and other European training institutions that have experience in professional training of civil servants.

== See also ==
Center for Adaptation of Civil Service to the Standards of EU - public institution established by the Decree of Cabinet of Ministers of Ukraine to facilitate administrative reform in Ukraine and to enhance the adaptation of the civil service to the standards of the European Union.
