= Ipa (spider) =

Scientific classification
- Kingdom: Animalia
- Phylum: Arthropoda
- Subphylum: Chelicerata
- Class: Arachnida
- Order: Araneae
- Infraorder: Araneomorphae
- Family: Linyphiidae
- Genus: Ipa; Saaristo, 2007

Type species
- I. keyserlingi (Ausserer, 1867)

Species
- 4, see text

Genus of spiders

Ipa is a genus of dwarf spiders that was first described by Michael I. Saaristo in 2007.

== Species ==
As of May 2019 it contains four species, found in the Czech Republic, France, Kazakhstan, Mongolia, Russia, Slovakia, Turkey, Turkmenistan, and Ukraine:

- Ipa keyserlingi (Ausserer, 1867) (type) – Europe, Caucasus
- Ipa pepticus (Tanasevitch, 1988) – Kazakhstan, Turkmenistan, Mongolia
- Ipa spasskyi (Tanasevitch, 1986) – Turkey, Ukraine, Russia (Europe, West Siberia), Kazakhstan
- Ipa terrenus (L. Koch, 1879) – France, Czech Republic, Slovakia, Eastern Europe, Caucasus, Russia (Europe to South Siberia)
