= Instituto Superior Autónomo de Estudos Politécnicos =

Coordinates: 38°42′30″N 9°8′58″W

IPA
- Instituto Superior Autónomo de Estudos Politécnicos
- Type: Private
- Established: 1990
- Director: António Alves Vieira
- Location: Lisbon, Portugal
- Website: http://www.ipa.univ.pt/

Instituto Superior Autónomo de Estudos Politécnicos (IPA) is a private polytechnic institution, located in Lisbon that offers courses in arts, technology and innovation.

== See also ==
- List of colleges and universities in Portugal
- Higher education in Portugal
