= Involvement and Participation Association =

The Involvement and Participation Association (IPA) is an organisation in the United Kingdom that promotes employee involvement and voice in the workplace.

== History ==
The first predecessor of IPA was known as the Labour Association and was founded in 1884 in the Central Cooperative Hall at Derby. Its full name was the "Labour Association for Promoting Co-Operative Production based on the Co-Partnership of the Workers".

In 1901 it changed its name to the Labour Co-Partnership Association. In 1928 it rebranded again to the Industrial Co-Partnership Association. In 1972 it then became the Industrial Participation Association. Finally in 1989 it was named the Involvement and Participation Association.

In May 2023, IPA merged with the Institute for Employment Studies (IES) and became an independent team within IES.

== See also ==
- UK labour law
