= Indian Pharmacist Association =

Indian Pharmacist Association (IPA)
- Indian Pharmacist Association logo

- Location of the organization Indian Pharmacist Association (Asia)
- Formation: 2011
- Established: 2011
- Headquarters: Delhi, India
- Location: B-18, Lane 7, Shashi Garden, Mayur Vihar Phase 1, Delhi, 110091
- Coordinates: 28.606040175008026°N 77.29302857360491°E
- Official language: English, Hindi
- National President: Abhay Kumar
- National Secretary General: Bhupendra Kumar
- Main organ: Global Health Workforce Allinace (WHO)
- Website: www.ipa-india.in

The Indian Pharmacist Association (IPA) is the professional body for pharmacists of India. Members include hospital pharmacists, manufacturing pharmacists, teachers and clinical pharmacists. Founded in 2011, the association is a member of the Global Health Workforce Alliance (WHO). The IPA is at present the largest organizations of pharmacists in India with more than 3.72 lakhs active members across India. The Association has its State branch in Jammu & Kashmir, Himachal Pradesh, Punjab, Gujrat, Rajasthan, Uttar Pradesh, Bihar, Tripura, Telangana, Andhra Pradesh, Chhattisgarh, Madhya Pradesh, Maharashtra, Manipur, Andaman & Nicobar Islands. The main objective of IPA is to Strengthen The Pharmacy Profession by proper placement of pharmacists to play a role in the health care sector in India.

Indian Pharmacist Association (IPA) recently organised a national conference on Indian pharmacists at Maulana Azad Institute of Dental Sciences in Delhi. The theme for the conference was ‘Challenges Today and Tomorrow.’ Different associations representing various states participated in the conference.
