= Motor (American magazine) =

MOTOR Magazine
- Editor: John Lypen
- Categories: Trade magazine
- Frequency: Monthly
- Founder: William Randolph Hearst
- Founded: 1903
- Company: Hearst Business Publishing
- Country: United States
- Based in: Troy, Michigan
- Language: English
- Website: www.motor.com/magazine
- ISSN: 0027-1748

MOTOR Magazine was founded in 1903 by William Randolph Hearst, published by Hearst Corp. What began as a relatively small magazine for wealthy motorists transformed over the years into the leading monthly service and repair publication for shops and technicians.

In 2021, MOTOR Magazine evolved into a digital publication with an expanded audience base, providing valuable information across the wide variety of automotive industries served by its parent company, MOTOR Information Systems.

MOTOR Magazine is headquartered in Troy, Michigan.
