= National Institute of Public Administration (Damascus) =

Government school

Coordinates: 33°35′59.89″N 36°19′36.36″E

The National Institute of Public Administration, (Arabic: الْمَعْهَدُ الْوَطَنيٍّ لِلْإِدَارَةِ الْعَامَّةِ, romanized: al-Maʿhad al-Waṭanī li l-ʾIdārat al-ʿAmmāh; French: Institut national d'administration) is a Syrian government school responsible for the training of civil servants in management and administration. Its main office and training center is located in At-Tal, near Damascus.

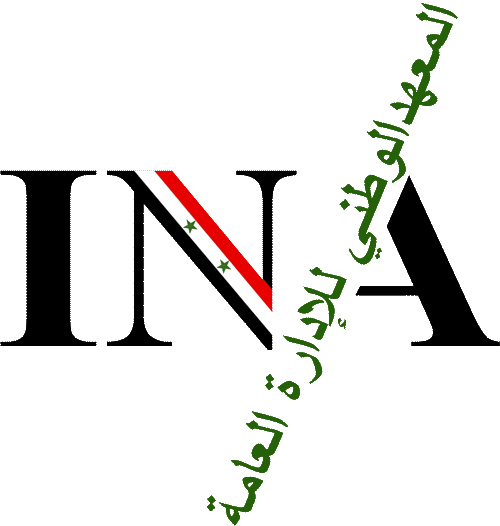
Logo of INA.

== History ==
The Institute was created in 2002 to support the modernization of civil service in Syria. INA was the fruit of cooperation between France and Syria. The French École nationale d'administration provided technical assistance from 2001 to 2011.

== Mission ==
The founding principle of the Institute National d'Administration (INA) is to provide professional training for senior civil servants.

The Institute emphasizes the ethics of government service, based on the values of responsibility, political neutrality and service. INA uses a broad approach that cuts across ministerial or specialist lines and includes law, public finance, applied economics, Arab, regional and international issues, local regions and e-government. public-sector management, including team and project management, monitoring and evaluating efforts involving multiple agencies, and human resources management, all in a constantly changing environment.

== Areas of expertise ==
- A core curriculum for high-level civil servants
- Continuing education programmes and advanced training for Syrian civil servants through short and long training courses
- Bilateral and international relations in the areas of governance and public administration
- Offering consultancy and expertise services to public services in Syria on administrative modernization issues

== Recruitment procedure ==
Admission to INA is based on a competitive examination that people take after completing university studies. It is open to civil servants and non-civil servants and proceeded by a preparation cycle of seven months. The competitive exam includes essays on:

- the economy and administration,
- general knowledge,
- an exam on foreign language (French or English),
- an exam on the multiple choices method on the three disciplines mentioned above.

An oral exam, taken by those with the highest marks in the written exam, covering:

- A discipline chosen by the candidate (law, economy, general knowledge),
- One or two foreign languages (French or English).
