= Adel Safar government =

2011–2012 Syrian government

- 89th government of the Syrian Arab Republic
- Date formed: 14 April 2011
- Date dissolved: 23 June 2012

People and organisations
- President: Bashar al-Assad
- Prime Minister: Adel Safar
- No. of ministers: 30
- Member parties: ▌Ba'ath Party; ▌Socialist Unionist; ▌Arab Socialist Movement; ▌SSNP
- Status in legislature: Majority coalition government

History
- Legislature term: 9th People's Assembly
- Predecessor: al-Otari
- Successor: Hijab

The Adel Safar government was the eighty-ninth government since the establishment of the modern Syrian state in 1918 and the third government to serve under the presidency of Bashar al-Assad. On 2 April 2011, President Bashar al-Assad issued Decree No. 134 designating Adel Safar to form a new Government. On 14 April 2011, the new Government was announced through Decree No. 146.

The government was established in the early stages of the Syrian civil war, following the resignation of the Muhammad Naji al-Otari government amid nationwide anti-government protests that began in March 2011. Comprising thirty ministers, half of whom had served in the previous government, it introduced significant changes to the economic, service, and security portfolios. Shortly before its formation, the Ministry of Expatriates was merged with the Ministry of Foreign Affairs to create the Ministry of Foreign Affairs and Expatriates.

During its tenure, the government oversaw a series of legislative and administrative reforms, including the lifting of the state of emergency that had been in force since 1963, the abolition of the Supreme State Security Court, the adoption of new laws on public demonstrations, elections, local administration, and the media, and the implementation of a presidential amnesty for political detainees. It also introduced a number of economic measures, including adjustments to fuel subsidies and prices, the creation of an agricultural drought relief fund, and the suspension of the free trade agreement with Turkey.

The government operated during a period of escalating unrest and international isolation. Its prime minister and several senior ministers were subjected to sanctions by the United States, the European Union, and Canada, while the Arab League imposed sanctions on the Syrian government as part of efforts to secure its acceptance of an Arab peace initiative aimed at resolving the crisis.

== Composition ==
Portfolio	Minister	Took office	Left office	Party
Prime Minister	Adel Safar	14 April 2011	23 June 2012	Ba'ath Party
Minister of Defense	Ali Habib Mahmud	3 June 2009	8 August 2011	Ba'ath Party
Minister of Defense	Dawoud Rajiha	8 August 2011	23 June 2012	Ba'ath Party
Minister of Foreign Affairs and Expatriates	Walid Muallem	21 February 2006	23 June 2012	Ba'ath Party
Minister of Oil and Mineral Resources	Sufian Allaw	21 February 2006	23 June 2012	
Minister of Communications and Technology	Emad Sabouni	8 December 2007	23 June 2012	
Minister of Endowments	Mohammed Abdul Sattar	8 December 2007	23 June 2012	Ba'ath Party
Minister of Local Administration	Omar Ibrahim Ghalawanji	14 April 2011	23 June 2012	
Minister of Presidential Affairs	Mansour Azzam	23 April 2009	23 June 2012	
Minister of Tourism	Lamia Assi	14 April 2011	23 June 2012	
Minister of Culture	Riad Ismat	3 October 2010	23 June 2012	
Minister of Irrigation	George Malki Soumi	3 October 2010	23 June 2012	
Minister of Justice	Tayseer Qala Awwad	14 April 2011	23 June 2012	
Minister of Agriculture and Agrarian Reform	Riyad Farid Hijab	14 April 2011	23 June 2012	Ba'ath Party
Minister of Social Affairs and Labor	Radwan al-Habib	14 April 2011	23 June 2012	
Minister of Higher Education	Abdul-Razzaq Sheikh Issa	14 April 2011	23 June 2012	
Minister of Interior	Mohammad al-Shaar	14 April 2011	23 June 2012	Ba'ath Party
Minister of Finance	Mohammad al-Jililati	14 April 2011	23 June 2012	
Minister of Economy and Trade	Mohammad Nidal al-Shaar	14 April 2011	23 June 2012	
Minister of Education	Saleh al-Rashed	14 April 2011	23 June 2012	
Minister of Health	Wael Nader al-Halqi	14 April 2011	23 June 2012	Ba'ath Party
Minister of Housing and Construction	Hala Mohammad al-Nasser	14 April 2011	23 June 2012	Ba'ath Party
Minister of Transport	Fayssal Abbas	14 April 2011	23 June 2012	
Minister of Electricity	Imad Khamis	14 April 2011	23 June 2012	Ba'ath Party
Minister of Information	Adnan Hassan Mahmoud	14 April 2011	23 June 2012	
Minister of Industry	Adnan Salkho	14 April 2011	23 June 2012	
Minister of State for Environmental Affairs	Kawkab Sabah al-Daya	23 April 2009	23 June 2012	Ba'ath Party
Minister of State	Yousef Suleiman al-Ahmad	14 April 2011	23 June 2012	
Minister of State	Ghiath Jeraatli	14 April 2011	23 June 2012	
Minister of State	Hussein Mahmoud Farzat	14 April 2011	23 June 2012	Arab Socialist Movement
Minister of State	Joseph Sweid	14 April 2011	23 June 2012	SSNP
Minister of State	Hassan al-Sari	14 April 2011	23 June 2012	Socialist Unionist

== See also ==
- Council of Ministers (Syria)
- List of Syrian governments
- Government ministries of Syria
- List of prime ministers of Syria
