= Muhammad Naji al-Otari government =

2003–2011 Syrian government

- 88th government of the Syrian Arab Republic

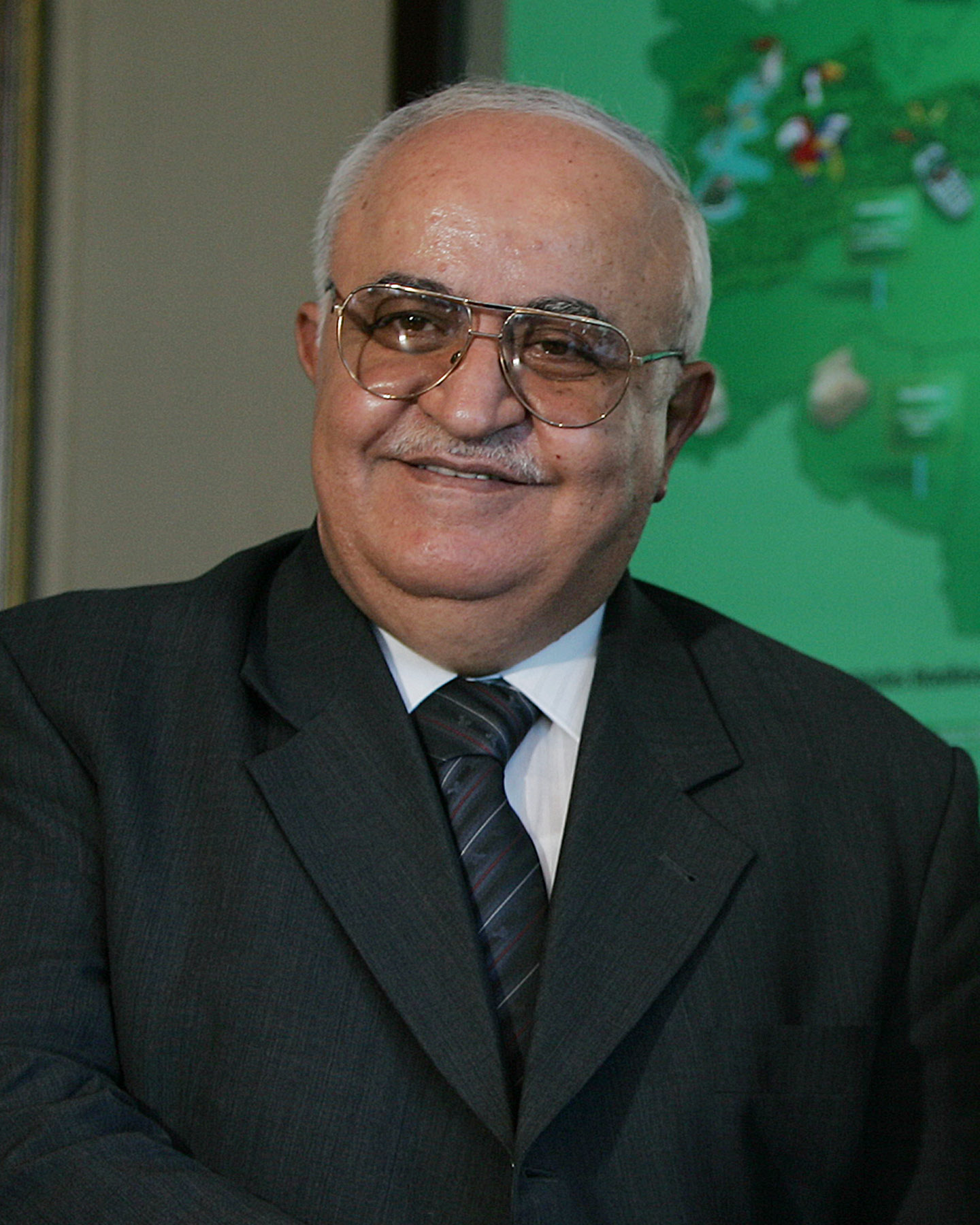
- Date formed: 10 September 2003
- Date dissolved: 29 March 2011

People and organisations
- President: Bashar al-Assad
- Prime Minister: Muhammad Naji al-Otari
- Deputy Prime Minister: Abdullah Dardari
- Member parties: ▌Ba'ath Party; ▌Socialist Unionist; ▌Arab Socialist Movement; ▌SSNP
- Status in legislature: Majority coalition government

History
- Outgoing election: 2007
- Legislature terms: 8th and 9th People's Assemblies
- Predecessor: Mero II
- Successor: Safar

The Muhammad Naji al-Otari government was the second Syrian government formed during the presidency of Bashar al-Assad. It was announced on 10 September 2003, by Prime Minister Muhammad Mustafa Mero. The government lasted until 29 March 2011, and resigned in the wake of the Syrian Civil War.

== Composition ==
Portfolio	Minister	Took office	Left office	Party
Prime Minister	Muhammad Naji al-Otari	18 September 2003	29 March 2011	Ba'ath Party
Deputy Prime Minister for Economic Affairs	Abdullah Dardari	14 June 2005	29 March 2011	
Minister of Foreign Affairs	Farouk al-Sharaa	11 March 1984	21 February 2006	Ba'ath Party
Minister of Foreign Affairs	Walid Muallem	21 February 2006	29 March 2011	Ba'ath Party
Minister of Finance	Mohammed al-Hussein	18 September 2003	29 March 2011	Ba'ath Party
Minister of Defense	Mustafa Tlass	22 March 1972	12 May 2004	Ba'ath Party
Minister of Defense	Hasan Turkmani	12 May 2004	3 June 2009	Ba'ath Party
Minister of Defense	Ali Habib Mahmud	3 June 2009	29 March 2011	Ba'ath Party
Minister of Higher Education	Hani Murtada	18 September 2003	21 February 2006	
Minister of Higher Education	Ghayath Barakat	21 February 2006	29 March 2011	
Minister of Local Administration	Hilal al-Atrash	13 December 2001	23 April 2009	
Minister of Local Administration	Tamer al-Hajjeh	23 April 2009	29 March 2011	
Minister of Tourism	Saadallah Agha al-Qalaa	13 December 2001	29 March 2011	
Minister of Agriculture and Agrarian Reform	Adel Safar	18 September 2003	29 March 2011	Ba'ath Party
Minister of Expatriates	Bouthaina Shaaban	18 September 2003	30 July 2008	Ba'ath Party
Minister of Expatriates	Joseph Sweid	30 July 2008	29 March 2011	SSNP
Minister of Education	Ali Saad	18 September 2003	29 March 2011	Ba'ath Party
Minister of Economy and Trade	Ghassan al-Rifai	13 December 2001	4 October 2004	
Minister of Economy and Trade	Amer Husni Lutfi	4 October 2004	19 January 2010	
Minister of Economy and Trade	Lamia Assi	19 January 2010	29 March 2011	
Minister of Health	Muhammad Iyad al-Shatti	1 November 1987	4 October 2004	
Minister of Health	Maher Hammami	4 October 2004	23 April 2009	
Minister of Health	Rida Said	23 April 2009	29 March 2011	
Minister of Justice	Nizar Assi	18 September 2003	4 October 2004	
Minister of Justice	Muhammad al-Ghafri	4 October 2004	23 April 2009	
Minister of Justice	Ahmad Younes	23 April 2009	29 March 2011	
Minister of Endowments	Muhammad Ziyada	13 March 2000	4 October 2004	
Minister of Endowments	Ziyad al-Din al-Ayyubi	4 October 2004	8 December 2007	Independent
Minister of Endowments	Mohammed Abdul Sattar	8 December 2007	29 March 2011	Ba'ath Party
Minister of Irrigation	Nader Bunni	18 September 2003	3 October 2010	
Minister of Irrigation	George Malki Soumi	3 October 2010	29 March 2011	
Minister of Social Affairs and Labor	Siham Dello	18 September 2003	4 October 2004	
Minister of Social Affairs and Labor	Diala al-Hajj Aref	4 October 2004	29 March 2011	
Minister of Oil and Mineral Reserves	Ibrahim Haddad	13 December 2001	21 February 2006	
Minister of Oil and Mineral Reserves	Sufian Allaw	21 February 2006	29 March 2011	
Minister of Interior	Ali Hammoud	13 December 2001	4 October 2004	
Minister of Interior	Ghazi Kanaan	4 October 2004	21 February 2006	
Minister of Interior	Bassam Abdel Majeed	21 February 2006	23 April 2009	
Minister of Interior	Said Mohammad Sammour	23 April 2009	29 March 2011	
Minister of Information	Ahmad Hassan	18 September 2003	4 October 2004	
Minister of Information	Mahdi Dakhlallah	4 October 2004	21 February 2006	
Minister of Information	Muhsen Bilal	21 February 2006	29 March 2011	Ba'ath Party
Minister of Culture	Mahmoud Sayyed	18 September 2003	21 February 2006	
Minister of Culture	Riyad Naasan Agha	21 February 2006	3 October 2010	
Minister of Culture	Riad Ismat	3 October 2010	29 March 2011	
Minister of Electricity	Munib Saem al-Dahr	13 March 2000	21 February 2006	
Minister of Electricity	Ahmad Khaled al-Ali	21 February 2006	18 September 2008	
Minister of Electricity	Ahmad Qusay Kayyali	18 September 2008	29 March 2011	
Minister of Housing and Construction	Nihad Mshantat	18 September 2003	21 February 2006	
Minister of Housing and Construction	Hammoud al-Hussein	21 February 2006	18 September 2008	
Minister of Housing and Construction	Omar Ibrahim Ghalawanji	18 September 2008	29 March 2011	
Minister of Transport	Makram Obeid	13 December 2001	21 February 2006	
Minister of Transport	Yarub Badr	21 February 2006	29 March 2011	
Minister of Industry	Muhammad Safi Abu Dan	18 September 2003	4 October 2004	
Minister of Industry	Ghassan Tayyara	4 October 2004	21 February 2006	
Minister of Industry	Fuad Issa al-Jouni	21 February 2006	29 March 2011	
Minister of Communication and Technology	Muhammad Bashir Monjed	13 December 2001	21 February 2006	
Minister of Communication and Technology	Amr Nazir Salem	21 February 2006	8 December 2007	
Minister of Communication and Technology	Emad Sabouni	8 December 2007	29 March 2011	
Minister of State for Presidential Affairs	Ghassan al-Lahham	18 September 2003	23 April 2009	
Minister of State for Presidential Affairs	Mansour Azzam	23 April 2009	29 March 2011	
Minister of State for Administrative Development	Yousef Suleiman al-Ahmad	18 September 2003	29 March 2011	
Minister of State for the Syrian Arab Red Crescent	Bashar al-Shaar	18 September 2003	29 March 2011	
Minister of State for Vital Projects	Muhammad Kharrat	18 September 2003	21 February 2006	
Minister of State for Vital Projects	Hussein Mahmoud Farzat	21 February 2006	29 March 2011	Arab Socialist Movement
Minister of State for Population Affairs	Ghayyath Jaraatly	18 September 2003	29 March 2011	
Minister of State for Parliamentary Affairs	Hussam al-Asswad	18 September 2003	21 February 2006	
Minister of State for Parliamentary Affairs	Joseph Sweid	21 February 2006	30 July 2008	SSNP
Minister of State for International Relations	Hassan al-Sari	21 February 2006	29 March 2011	Socialist Unionist
Minister of State of the Environment	Kawkab Sabah al-Daya	23 April 2009	29 March 2011	

== See also ==
- Council of Ministers (Syria)
- List of Syrian governments
- Government ministries of Syria
- List of prime ministers of Syria
