= First Wael al-Halqi government =

2012–2014 Syrian government

- 91st government of the Syrian Arab Republic

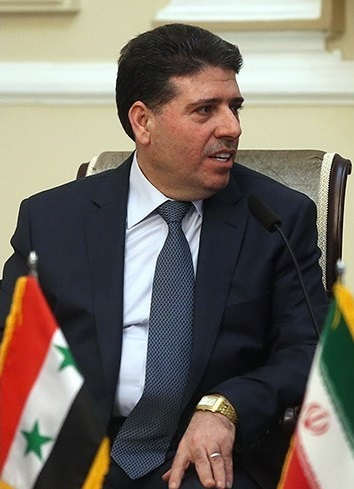
- Wael Nader al-Halqi
- Date formed: 9 August 2012
- Date dissolved: 10 August 2014

People and organisations
- President: Bashar al-Assad
- Prime Minister: Wael Nader al-Halqi
- Member parties: ▌Ba'ath Party; ▌Arab Socialist Union; ▌Communist Party (Unified); ▌Communist Party (Bakdash); ▌SSNP; ▌Socialist Unionist; ▌People's Will
- Status in legislature: National unity government

History
- Election: 2012
- Legislature term: 1st People's Assembly
- Predecessor: Hijab
- Successor: al-Halqi II

The First Wael al-Halqi government was the ninety-first government since the establishment of the modern Syrian state in 1918 and the fifth government to serve under the presidency of Bashar al-Assad. Although formally established on 9 August 2012, it was a continuation of the Riyad Hijab government following Hijab's defection from Syria during the Syrian civil war. After Hijab was dismissed by presidential decree on 6 August 2012, Deputy Prime Minister Omar Ibrahim Ghalawanji served as acting Prime Minister until Wael Nader al-Halqi was appointed to head the government.

The government remained in office until 10 August 2014, when al-Halqi was tasked with forming a new government following the 2014 Syrian presidential election. During its tenure, the government underwent several reshuffles, including appointments to the ministries of Industry, Justice, Health, Higher Education, Economy and Foreign Trade, Tourism, and Internal Trade and Consumer Protection.

One of the most significant events during the government's tenure was the dismissal of Deputy Prime Minister for Economic Affairs Qadri Jamil on 29 October 2013. The Syrian government stated that he had been removed for failing to attend his official duties and conducting unauthorised political meetings abroad during the ongoing conflict. Jamil, who represented the People's Will Party, rejected the government's explanation, stating that his political activities were conducted independently of the government and that his party had always maintained its autonomy within the government.

The government continued to administer Syria during one of the most intense phases of the civil war, overseeing state institutions while confronting mounting military, political, and economic challenges.

== Composition ==
Portfolio	Minister	Took office	Left office	Party
Prime Minister	Wael al-Halqi	9 August 2012	3 July 2016	Ba'ath Party
Deputy Prime Minister	Walid Muallem	23 June 2012	16 November 2020	Ba'ath Party
Deputy Prime Minister for Services Affairs	Omar Ibrahim Ghalawanji	23 June 2012	22 June 2016	Independent
Deputy Prime Minister for Economic Affairs	Qadri Jamil	23 June 2012	29 October 2013	People's Will Party
Minister of Defense	Fahd Jassem al-Freij	18 July 2012	1 January 2018	Ba'ath Party
Minister of Foreign Affairs and Expatriates	Walid Muallem	21 February 2006	16 November 2020	Ba'ath Party
Minister of Interior	Mohammad al-Shaar	14 April 2011	26 November 2018	Ba'ath Party
Minister of Presidential Affairs	Mansour Fadlallah Azzam	23 June 2012	13 December 2023	Independent
Minister of Justice	Radwan al-Habib	23 June 2012	16 August 2012	Ba'ath Party
Minister of Justice	Najm Hamad al-Ahmad	16 August 2012	29 March 2017	Ba'ath Party
Minister of Finance	Mohammad al-Jililati	14 April 2011	27 August 2014	Ba'ath Party
Minister of Local Administration	Omar Ibrahim Ghalawanji	14 April 2011	22 June 2016	Independent
Minister of Endowments	Mohammed Abdul Sattar	8 December 2007	10 December 2024	Ba'ath Party
Minister of Education	Hazwan al-Waz	23 June 2012	26 November 2018	Ba'ath Party
Minister of Higher Education	Muhammad Yahya Mualla	23 June 2012	22 August 2013	Independent
Minister of Higher Education	Malek Ali	22 August 2013	27 August 2014	Independent
Minister of Health	Wael Nader al-Halqi	14 April 2011	16 August 2012	Ba'ath Party
Minister of Health	Saad Abdel-Salam	16 August 2012	27 August 2014	Ba'ath Party
Minister of Social Affairs and Labor	Jassem Mohammad Zakaria	9 August 2012	27 August 2014	Ba'ath Party
Minister of Water Resources	Bassam Hanna	23 June 2012	27 August 2014	Independent
Minister of Agriculture and Agrarian Reform	Subhi Ahmad al-Abdullah	23 June 2012	27 August 2014	Ba'ath Party
Minister of Industry	Fuad Shukri Kurdi	23 June 2012	16 August 2012	Independent
Minister of Industry	Adnan Abdo al-Sukhni	16 August 2012	22 August 2013	Ba'ath Party
Minister of Industry	Kamal Eddin Tu'ma	22 August 2013	3 July 2016	Independent
Minister of Internal Trade and Consumer Protection	Qadri Jamil	23 June 2012	22 August 2013	People's Will Party
Minister of Internal Trade and Consumer Protection	Samir Izzat Qadi Amin	22 August 2013	27 August 2014	Independent
Minister of Economy and Foreign Trade	Mohamed Dhafer Mahbek	23 June 2012	22 August 2013	Independent
Minister of Economy and Foreign Trade	Khodr Orfali	22 August 2013	27 August 2014	Independent
Minister of Electricity	Imad Khamis	14 April 2011	3 July 2016	Ba'ath Party
Minister of Oil and Mineral Resources	Said Heneidy	23 June 2012	27 August 2014	Independent
Minister of Transport	Mahmoud Ibrahim Saeed	23 June 2012	27 August 2014	Independent
Minister of Communications and Technology	Emad Sabouni	8 December 2007	27 August 2014	Ba'ath Party
Minister of Housing and Urban Development	Safwan al-Assaf	9 August 2012	27 August 2014	Independent
Minister of Public Works	Yasser al-Seba'ei	9 August 2012	27 August 2014	Independent
Minister of Information	Omran al-Zoubi	23 June 2012	3 July 2016	Ba'ath Party
Minister of Culture	Lubanah Mshaweh	23 June 2012	27 August 2014	Independent
Minister of Tourism	Hala Mohammad al-Nasser	23 June 2012	22 August 2013	Ba'ath Party
Minister of Tourism	Bishr al-Yaziji	22 August 2013	26 November 2018	Independent
Minister of State for National Reconciliation Affairs	Ali Haidar	23 June 2012	26 November 2018	SSNP
Minister of State for Environmental Affairs	Nazira Farah Sarkis	23 June 2012	3 July 2016	Independent
Minister of State	Abdullah Khalil Hussein	23 June 2012	3 July 2016	Independent
Minister of State	Hussein Mahmoud Farzat	9 August 2012	27 August 2014	Arab Socialist Movement
Minister of State	Joseph Sweid	14 April 2011	27 August 2014	Independent
Minister of State	Jamal Shaaban Shahin	23 June 2012	27 August 2014	Socialist Unionist
Minister of State	Muhammad Turki al-Sayyed	23 June 2012	9 January 2014	ASU
Minister of State	Najm al-Din Khreit	23 June 2012	22 August 2013	Independent
Minister of State	Hasib Ilyas Shammas	22 August 2013	3 July 2016	Independent

== See also ==
- Council of Ministers (Syria)
- List of Syrian governments
- Government ministries of Syria
- List of prime ministers of Syria
