= Riyad Hijab government =

June 2012–August 2012 Syrian government

- 90th government of the Syrian Arab Republic

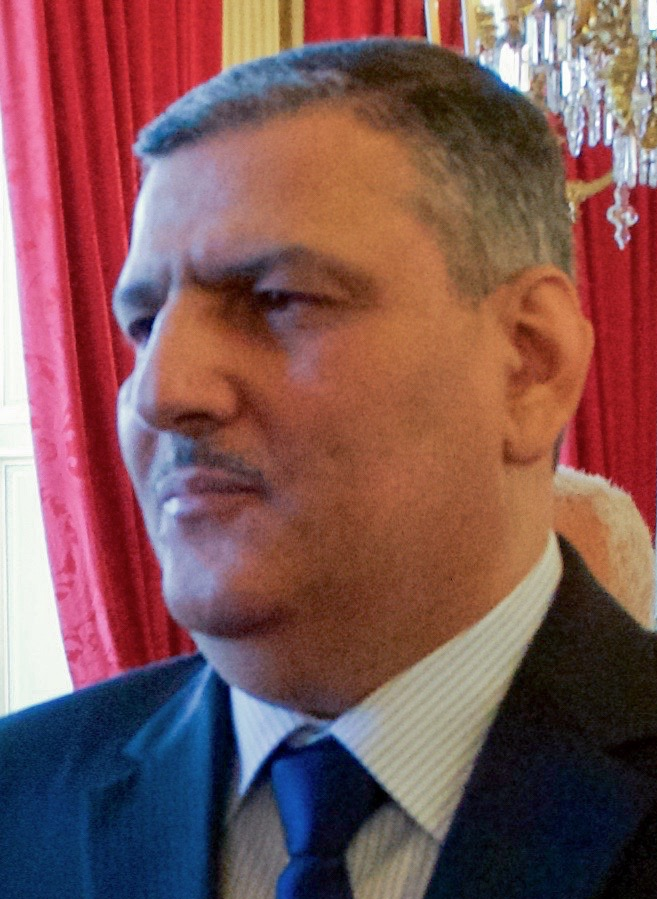
- Date formed: 23 June 2012
- Date dissolved: 6 August 2012

People and organisations
- President: Bashar al-Assad
- Prime Minister: Riyad Farid Hijab
- Member parties: ▌Ba'ath Party; ▌Arab Socialist Union; ▌Communist Party (Unified); ▌Communist Party (Bakdash); ▌SSNP; ▌Socialist Unionist; ▌People's Will
- Status in legislature: National unity government

History
- Election: 2012
- Legislature term: 1st People's Assembly
- Predecessor: Safar
- Successor: al-Halqi I

The Riyad Hijab government was the fourth Syrian government formed during the presidency of Bashar al-Assad. It was formed on 23 June 2012 and dissolved on 6 August 2012 after Prime Minister Riyad Farid Hijab defected. He was later succeeded by Wael Nader al-Halqi.

The Riyad Hijab government was the ninetieth government since the establishment of the modern Syrian state in 1918 and the fourth government to serve under the presidency of Bashar al-Assad. Formed on 23 June 2012 by Decree No. 210, the government was headed by Riyad Hijab and succeeded the Adel Safar government during the escalating Syrian civil war.

The government was formed following the resignation of the Adel Safar government on 7 June 2012. It included eleven new ministers, introduced changes to several ministerial portfolios, created a new ministry, and added two Ministers of State, reflecting an effort to reorganise the government amid the ongoing conflict.

The government remained in office for only six weeks. On 6 August 2012, Prime Minister Riad Hijab defected from the Syrian government and joined the opposition, becoming the highest-ranking civilian official to do so during the civil war. Following his defection, Deputy Prime Minister Omar Ibrahim Ghalawanji served as acting Prime Minister until Wael Nader al-Halqi was appointed Prime Minister on 9 August 2012, bringing the Hijab government to an end.

== Composition ==
Portfolio	Minister	Took office	Left office	Party
Prime Minister	Riyad Farid Hijab	23 June 2012	6 August 2012	Ba'ath Party
Deputy Prime Minister	Dawoud Rajiha	23 June 2012	18 July 2012	Ba'ath Party
Deputy Prime Minister	Walid Muallem	23 June 2012	6 August 2012	Ba'ath Party
Deputy Prime Minister for Economic Affairs	Qadri Jamil	23 June 2012	6 August 2012	People's Will Party
Minister of Internal Trade and Consumer Protection	Qadri Jamil	23 June 2012	6 August 2012	People's Will Party
Deputy Prime Minister for Services Affairs	Omar Ibrahim Ghalawanji	23 June 2012	6 August 2012	Independent
Minister of Local Administration and Environment	Omar Ibrahim Ghalawanji	14 April 2011	6 August 2012	Independent
Minister of Presidential Affairs	Mansour Fadlallah Azzam	23 June 2012	6 August 2012	Independent
Minister of Agriculture and Agrarian Reform	Subhi Ahmad al-Abdullah	23 June 2012	6 August 2012	Ba'ath Party
Minister of Communications and Information Technology	Emad Sabouni	8 December 2007	6 August 2012	Ba'ath Party
Minister of Defense	Dawoud Rajiha	8 August 2011	18 July 2012	Ba'ath Party
Minister of Defense	Fahd Jassem al-Freij	18 July 2012	6 August 2012	Ba'ath Party
Minister of Economy and Foreign Trade	Mohamned Dhafer Mahbek	23 June 2012	6 August 2012	Independent
Minister of Education	Hazwan al-Wuz	23 June 2012	6 August 2012	Independent
Minister of Endowments	Mohammed Abdul Sattar	8 December 2007	6 August 2012	Ba'ath Party
Minister of Electricity	Imad Khamis	14 April 2011	6 August 2012	Ba'ath Party
Minister of Finance	Mohammad al-Jililati	14 April 2011	6 August 2012	Ba'ath Party
Minister of Foreign Affairs and Expatriates	Walid Muallem	21 February 2006	6 August 2012	Ba'ath Party
Minister of Higher Education and Scientific Research	Muhammad Yahya Mualla	23 June 2012	6 August 2012	Independent
Minister of Social Affairs and Labor	Jassem Mohammad Zakaria	14 April 2011	6 August 2012	Ba'ath Party
Minister of Public Works and Housing	Mansour Fadlallah Azzam	23 June 2012	6 August 2012	Independent
Minister of Information	Omran al-Zoubi	23 June 2012	6 August 2012	Ba'ath Party
Minister of Health	Wael Nader al-Halqi	14 April 2011	6 August 2012	Ba'ath Party
Minister of Interior	Mohammad al-Shaar	14 April 2011	6 August 2012	Ba'ath Party
Minister of Industry	Fuad Shukri Kurdi	23 June 2012	6 August 2012	Independent
Minister of Justice	Radwan al-Habib	23 June 2012	6 August 2012	Ba'ath Party
Minister of Oil and Mineral Resources	Said Heneidy	23 June 2012	6 August 2012	Independent
Minister of Transport	Mahmoud Ibrahim Saeed	23 June 2012	6 August 2012	Independent
Minister of Water Resources	Bassam Hanna	23 June 2012	6 August 2012	Independent
Minister of Culture	Lubanah Mshaweh	23 June 2012	6 August 2012	Independent
Minister of Tourism	Hala Mohammad al-Nasser	23 June 2012	6 August 2012	Ba'ath Party
Minister of State for National Reconciliation Affairs	Ali Haidar	23 June 2012	6 August 2012	SSNP
Minister of State for Environmental Affairs	Nazira Farah Sarkis	23 June 2012	6 August 2012	Independent
Minister of State	Joseph Sweid	14 April 2011	6 August 2012	SSNP
Minister of State	Mohammad Turki al-Sayyed	23 June 2012	6 August 2012	ASU
Minister of State	Najm al-Din Khreit	23 June 2012	6 August 2012	Communist (Unified)
Minister of State	Abdullah Khaleel Hussein	23 June 2012	6 August 2012	Communist (Bakdash)
Minister of State	Jamal Shaaban Shaheen	23 June 2012	6 August 2012	Socialist Unionist

== See also ==
- Cabinet of Syria
- Government ministries of Syria
- List of prime ministers of Syria
- Ministry of Defense (Syria)
- List of foreign ministers of Syria
