= Second Wael al-Halqi government =

2014–2016 Syrian government

- 92nd government of the Syrian Arab Republic

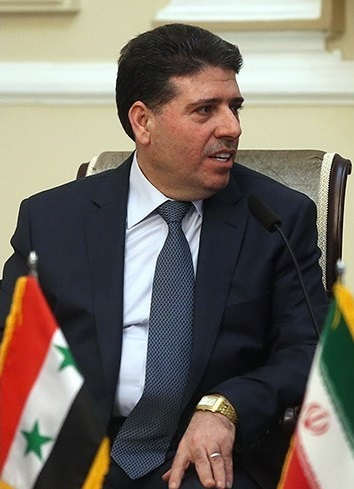
- Wael Nader al-Halqi
- Date formed: 10 August 2014
- Date dissolved: 22 June 2016

People and organisations
- President: Bashar al-Assad
- Prime Minister: Wael Nader al-Halqi
- Prime Minister's history: al-Halqi I
- Member parties: ▌Ba'ath Party; ▌Arab Socialist Union; ▌Communist Party (Unified); ▌SSNP; ▌Socialist Unionist
- Status in legislature: National unity government

History
- Legislature term: 1st People's Assembly
- Predecessor: al-Halqi I
- Successor: Khamis

The Second Wael al-Halqi government was the ninety-second government since the establishment of the modern Syrian state in 1918 and the sixth government to serve under the presidency of Bashar al-Assad. Formed on 28 August 2014 by Decree No. 273, the government followed Bashar al-Assad's re-election in the 2014 Syrian presidential election after Wael al-Halqi had been tasked with forming a new government on 10 August 2014.

The government introduced several changes to the structure of the Syrian executive. The Ministry of Social Affairs and Labour was divided into two separate ministries—the Ministry of Social Affairs and the Ministry of Labour—and a new Ministry of Administrative Development was established. The new ministry was tasked with improving public administration, modernising the civil service, enhancing government performance and public services, updating administrative legislation, developing state institutions, training public-sector personnel, promoting the use of information technology, and combating administrative corruption.

The government continued to govern Syria during the ongoing Syrian civil war, overseeing state administration, economic management, and public services amid the country's continuing political, military, and humanitarian challenges. It remained in office until July 2016, when it was succeeded by the Imad Khamis government following the 2016 parliamentary elections.

== Composition ==
Portfolio	Minister	Took office	Left office	Party
Prime Minister	Wael al-Halqi	9 August 2012	3 July 2016	Ba'ath Party
Deputy Prime Minister	Walid Muallem	23 June 2012	3 July 2016	Ba'ath Party
Deputy Prime Minister for Services Affairs	Omar Ibrahim Ghalawanji	23 June 2012	22 June 2016	Independent
Minister of Defense	Fahd Jassem al-Freij	18 July 2012	3 July 2016	Ba'ath Party
Minister of Foreign Affairs and Expatriates	Walid Muallem	21 February 2006	3 July 2016	Ba'ath Party
Minister of Interior	Mohammad al-Shaar	14 April 2011	3 July 2016	Ba'ath Party
Minister of Presidential Affairs	Mansour Fadlallah Azzam	23 June 2012	3 July 2016	Independent
Minister of Justice	Najm Hamad al-Ahmad	16 August 2012	3 July 2016	Ba'ath Party
Minister of Finance	Ismail Ismail	27 August 2014	3 July 2016	Independent
Minister of Local Administration	Omar Ibrahim Ghalawanji	14 April 2011	22 June 2016	Independent
Minister of Endowments	Mohammed Abdul Sattar	8 December 2007	3 July 2016	Ba'ath Party
Minister of Education	Hazwan al-Waz	23 June 2012	3 July 2016	Ba'ath Party
Minister of Higher Education	Muhammad Amer Mardini	27 August 2014	3 July 2016	Independent
Minister of Health	Nizar Wahbeh Yazigi	27 August 2014	3 July 2016	Ba'ath Party
Minister of Social Affairs	Kinda al-Shammat	27 August 2014	20 August 2015	Independent
Minister of Social Affairs	Rima al-Qadiri	20 August 2015	3 July 2016	Ba'ath Party
Minister of Labor	Khalaf Suleiman al-Abdullah	27 August 2014	3 July 2016	Independent
Minister of Administrative Development	Hassan al-Nouri	27 August 2014	3 July 2016	NIACS
Minister of Water Resources	Kamal al-Sheikha	27 August 2014	3 July 2016	Independent
Minister of Agriculture and Agrarian Reform	Ahmad al-Qadiri	27 August 2014	3 July 2016	Ba'ath Party
Minister of Industry	Kamal Eddin Tu'ma	22 August 2013	3 July 2016	Independent
Minister of Internal Trade and Consumer Protection	Hassan Safiyeh	27 August 2014	20 August 2015	Independent
Minister of Internal Trade and Consumer Protection	Jamal Shaaban Shahin	20 August 2015	3 July 2016	Socialist Unionist
Minister of Economy and Foreign Trade	Humam al-Jazaeri	27 August 2014	3 July 2016	Independent
Minister of Electricity	Imad Khamis	14 April 2011	3 July 2016	Ba'ath Party
Minister of Oil and Mineral Resources	Suleiman al-Abbas	27 August 2014	3 July 2016	Ba'ath Party
Minister of Transport	Ghazwan Khairbek	27 August 2014	3 July 2016	Ba'ath Party
Minister of Communications and Technology	Mohammad Ghazi al-Jalali	27 August 2014	3 July 2016	Independent
Minister of Housing and Urban Development	Mohammad Walid Ghazal	27 August 2014	3 July 2016	Ba'ath Party
Minister of Public Works	Hussein Arnous	27 August 2014	3 July 2016	Ba'ath Party
Minister of Information	Omran al-Zoubi	23 June 2012	3 July 2016	Ba'ath Party
Minister of Culture	Issam Khalil	27 August 2014	3 July 2016	Ba'ath Party
Minister of Tourism	Bishr al-Yaziji	27 August 2014	3 July 2016	Ba'ath Party
Minister of State for National Reconciliation Affairs	Ali Haidar	23 June 2012	3 July 2016	SSNP
Minister of State for Environmental Affairs	Nazira Farah Sarkis	23 June 2012	3 July 2016	Ba'ath Party
Minister of State	Jamal Shaaban Shahin	23 June 2012	3 July 2016	Socialist Unionist
Minister of State	Abdullah Khalil Hussain	23 June 2012	3 July 2016	Communist (Unified)
Minister of State	Hasib Ilyas Shammas	22 August 2013	3 July 2016	Independent
Minister of State	Muhammad Muti' Muayyad	27 August 2014	3 July 2016	ASU

== See also ==
- Council of Ministers (Syria)
- List of Syrian governments
- Government ministries of Syria
- List of prime ministers of Syria
