= List of members of the People's Assembly (Syria), 2007–2012 =

This is a list of members elected to the 9th People's Assembly, following the 2007 parliamentary election.

== Composition ==
Party		Members		
Party		Elected in 2007	At dissolution	Difference
NPF	Ba'ath Party	135 / 250 (54%)	135 / 250 (54%)	Steady
NPF	Socialist Unionist Party	18 / 250 (7%)	17 / 250 (7%)	▼1
NPF	Communist (Bakdash)	8 / 250 (3%)	8 / 250 (3%)	Steady
NPF	Arab Socialist Union Party	3 / 250 (1%)	4 / 250 (2%)	▲1
NPF	National Covenant Party	3 / 250 (1%)	3 / 250 (1%)	Steady
NPF	Syrian Social Nationalist Party	2 / 250 (0.8%)	2 / 250 (0.8%)	Steady
Independent		81 / 250 (32%)	81 / 250 (32%)	Steady

== Members ==
No.	Electoral district	Sector	Name	Party
1	Damascus	A	Muhammad Farouk Abu al-Shamat	Ba'ath Party
2	Damascus	A	Muhammad Ammar Saati	Ba'ath Party
3	Damascus	A	Munther Karkoutly	Ba'ath Party
4	Damascus	A	Huda Mleihi	Ba'ath Party
5	Damascus	A	Atif al-Zaybaq	Ba'ath Party
6	Damascus	A	Rama Aziz	Independent
7	Damascus	A	Abd al-Salam Rajeh	Independent
8	Damascus	A	Ghalib Aneez	Independent
9	Damascus	A	Muhammad al-Habash	Independent
10	Damascus	A	Nabil Dawoud	Independent
11	Damascus	B	Mahmoud al-Abrash	Ba'ath Party
12	Damascus	B	Suleiman Haddad	Ba'ath Party
13	Damascus	B	Huda al-Homsi	Ba'ath Party
14	Damascus	B	Muhammad Zuhair Taghlabi	Ba'ath Party
15	Damascus	B	Marwan al-Bunni	Socialist Unionist
16	Damascus	B	Haneen Nimr	Communist (Bakdash)
17	Damascus	B	Hazar al-Daqar	Ba'ath Party
18	Damascus	B	Muhammad Nabil al-Khatib	Ba'ath Party
19	Damascus	B	Ammar Bakdash	Communist (Bakdash)
20	Damascus	B	Joseph Sweid	SSNP
21	Damascus	B	Muhammad Hamsho	Independent
22	Damascus	B	Muhammad Sabah al-Ubayd	Independent
23	Damascus	B	Baha al-Din al-Hassan	Independent
24	Damascus	B	Samer al-Dibs	Independent
25	Damascus	B	Adnan al-Dakhakhni	Independent
26	Damascus	B	Muhammad Radwan al-Masri	Independent
27	Damascus	B	Muhammad Zaher Daabul	Independent
28	Damascus	B	Amer al-Homsi	Independent
29	Damascus	B	Hashem al-Aqqad	Independent
30	Rif Dimashq	A	Hamza Munther	Ba'ath Party
31	Rif Dimashq	A	Salah Taame	Ba'ath Party
32	Rif Dimashq	A	Ghiyath Ghazzal	Ba'ath Party
33	Rif Dimashq	A	Ahmad Sarhan	Ba'ath Party
34	Rif Dimashq	A	Diab Youssef	Socialist Unionist
35	Rif Dimashq	A	Salah Abla	Ba'ath Party
36	Rif Dimashq	A	Mustafa al-Sayyid Hamoud	Socialist Unionist
37	Rif Dimashq	A	Abdallah Sharha	Arab Socialist Union Party
38	Rif Dimashq	A	Abd al-Aziz Maqali	Independent
39	Rif Dimashq	A	Muhammad Barmou	Independent
40	Rif Dimashq	B	Nazih Abboud	Ba'ath Party
41	Rif Dimashq	B	Thuraya Muslimaniyya	Ba'ath Party
42	Rif Dimashq	B	Muhammad Osama Burhan	Ba'ath Party
43	Rif Dimashq	B	Ihsan Ataya	Ba'ath Party
44	Rif Dimashq	B	Ilham al-Hallaq	Ba'ath Party
45	Rif Dimashq	B	Adnan Arabsh	Ba'ath Party
46	Rif Dimashq	B	Munther Izz al-Din	Ba'ath Party
47	Rif Dimashq	B	Hussam al-Din Mustafa	Independent
48	Rif Dimashq	B	Mowaffaq al-Habashi	Independent
49	Aleppo	A	Muhammad Walid Ghazzal	Ba'ath Party
50	Aleppo	A	Muhammad Shaban Azzouz	Ba'ath Party
51	Aleppo	A	Iman Babelly	Ba'ath Party
52	Aleppo	A	Jumana Radwan	Communist (Bakdash)
53	Aleppo	A	Ramadan Hadleh	Arab Socialist Union Party
54	Aleppo	A	Abd al-Aziz al-Shami	Independent
55	Aleppo	A	Hilal Zayn al-Din	Independent
56	Aleppo	B	Muhammad Naji al-Otari	Ba'ath Party
57	Aleppo	B	Adnan al-Sukhni	Ba'ath Party
58	Aleppo	B	Ferya Siris	Ba'ath Party
59	Aleppo	B	Suhail Farah	Ba'ath Party
60	Aleppo	B	Abd al-Fattah Azzouz	Socialist Unionist
61	Aleppo	B	Ahmad Sajee	Communist (Bakdash)
62	Aleppo	B	Edward Makrabneh	Independent
63	Aleppo	B	Sonbol Sonbolian	Independent
64	Aleppo	B	Khaled Alabi	Independent
65	Aleppo	B	Al Hassan Berri	Independent
66	Aleppo	B	Muhammad Dalil	Independent
67	Aleppo	B	Muhammad Saleh al-Mallah	Independent
68	Aleppo	B	Abd al-Karim al-Sayyid	Independent
69	Districts of Aleppo Governorate	A	Ismat Mahalli	Ba'ath Party
70	Districts of Aleppo Governorate	A	Ahmad al-Abed	Ba'ath Party
71	Districts of Aleppo Governorate	A	Mustafa al-Oweid	Ba'ath Party
72	Districts of Aleppo Governorate	A	Riad Khallou	Ba'ath Party
73	Districts of Aleppo Governorate	A	Muhammad al-Muhammad	Ba'ath Party
74	Districts of Aleppo Governorate	A	Aqil al-Alawi	Ba'ath Party
75	Districts of Aleppo Governorate	A	Hassan Salloum	Ba'ath Party
76	Districts of Aleppo Governorate	A	Yahya Taleb	Socialist Unionist
77	Districts of Aleppo Governorate	A	Ikhlas Badawi	Ba'ath Party
78	Districts of Aleppo Governorate	A	Muhammad al-Ali	Ba'ath Party
79	Districts of Aleppo Governorate	A	Hussein Hassoun	Ba'ath Party
80	Districts of Aleppo Governorate	A	Ziad Mohsen	Ba'ath Party
81	Districts of Aleppo Governorate	A	Diab al-Mashi	Independent
82	Districts of Aleppo Governorate	A	Kamal Al Ammo	Independent
83	Districts of Aleppo Governorate	A	Aql al-Ibrahim	Independent
84	Districts of Aleppo Governorate	A	Hussein al-Haj Hamada	Independent
85	Districts of Aleppo Governorate	A	Fahmi Hassan	Independent
86	Districts of Aleppo Governorate	B	Abdo Muhammad	Ba'ath Party
87	Districts of Aleppo Governorate	B	Ahmad Haj Suleiman	Ba'ath Party
88	Districts of Aleppo Governorate	B	Muhammad Dib	Ba'ath Party
89	Districts of Aleppo Governorate	B	Ahmad Munir Muhammad	Ba'ath Party
90	Districts of Aleppo Governorate	B	Radwan al-Habib	Ba'ath Party
91	Districts of Aleppo Governorate	B	Mahmoud Youssef	Ba'ath Party
92	Districts of Aleppo Governorate	B	Ahmad Haji Mahmoud	Ba'ath Party
93	Districts of Aleppo Governorate	B	Ali al-Zwein	Ba'ath Party
94	Districts of Aleppo Governorate	B	Muhammad Nafeh Bouzan	Communist (Bakdash)
95	Districts of Aleppo Governorate	B	Farouk Haj Ali al-Jassem	Independent
96	Districts of Aleppo Governorate	B	Abd al-Qadir Shahada	Independent
97	Districts of Aleppo Governorate	B	Khalil al-Ubayd	Independent
98	Districts of Aleppo Governorate	B	Muhammad Shaheen	Independent
99	Districts of Aleppo Governorate	B	Abd al-Hamid al-Ghabari	Independent
100	Districts of Aleppo Governorate	B	Muhammad Jumaa	Independent
101	Homs	A	Najat Attallah	Ba'ath Party
102	Homs	A	Abd al-Muati Mashlab	Ba'ath Party
103	Homs	A	Hassan al-Ikhwan	Ba'ath Party
104	Homs	A	Maher al-Jajeh	Communist (Bakdash)
105	Homs	A	Abdallah Taqtaq	Ba'ath Party
106	Homs	A	Muhammad Abbas	Ba'ath Party
107	Homs	A	Imad Ghalayoun	National Covenant
108	Homs	A	Firas al-Salloum	Independent
109	Homs	A	Abd al-Aziz al-Mulhim	Ba'ath Party
110	Homs	A	Mahmoud al-Fadous	Independent
111	Homs	A	Zuhair Tarraf	Independent
112	Homs	B	Ahmad Qasham	Ba'ath Party
113	Homs	B	Fadia Dib	Ba'ath Party
114	Homs	B	Muhammad al-Assad	Ba'ath Party
115	Homs	B	Hussein Rahma	Socialist Unionist
116	Homs	B	Fajr al-Issa	Ba'ath Party
117	Homs	B	Hassan al-Saqqa	Ba'ath Party
118	Homs	B	Muhammad Farhan Sahloul	SSNP
119	Homs	B	Shahadi Mayhoub	Independent
120	Homs	B	Muhammad Safouq al-Naseef	Independent
121	Homs	B	Abdo al-Najib	Independent
122	Homs	B	Wael Mulhem	Independent
123	Homs	B	Ahmad al-Sheikh	Independent
124	Hama	A	Sahar al-Hassoun	Ba'ath Party
125	Hama	A	Matanyous Issa	Ba'ath Party
126	Hama	A	Kulthoum Wardeh	Ba'ath Party
127	Hama	A	Nadim Maryam	Ba'ath Party
128	Hama	A	Bilal Deeb	Ba'ath Party
129	Hama	A	Souad al-Sheikh Bakkour	Ba'ath Party
130	Hama	A	Nouri al-Hamoud al-Hassan al-Khalil	Socialist Unionist
131	Hama	A	Akram Hour	National Covenant
132	Hama	A	Abd al-Aziz al-Hassan	Ba'ath Party
133	Hama	A	Ibrahim al-Khalil	Independent
134	Hama	A	Abd al-Karim al-Ismail	Independent
135	Hama	A	Hashem Isbar	Independent
136	Hama	A	Khaled Muhammad	Independent
137	Hama	B	Maan Ali	Ba'ath Party
138	Hama	B	Bashar Junaid	Ba'ath Party
139	Hama	B	Muhammad Said Tabash	Ba'ath Party
140	Hama	B	Joseph al-Maghout	Ba'ath Party
141	Hama	B	Jihad Murad	Ba'ath Party
142	Hama	B	Ghazi al-Khattab	Socialist Unionist
143	Hama	B	Ali al-Amouri	Independent
144	Hama	B	Ibrahim al-Asmar	Independent
145	Hama	B	Fouad al-Shalli	Independent
146	Latakia	A	Kamal Salameh	Ba'ath Party
147	Latakia	A	Hassan Ali	Ba'ath Party
148	Latakia	A	Adnan Beitar	Ba'ath Party
149	Latakia	A	Mahasin Fateh	Ba'ath Party
150	Latakia	A	Ibrahim Baddour	Ba'ath Party
151	Latakia	A	Muhammad Ajil	Ba'ath Party
152	Latakia	A	Saer Qudsiya	Ba'ath Party
153	Latakia	A	Fawaz Nassour	Independent
154	Latakia	A	Zakaria Salwayeh	Independent
155	Latakia	B	Jaafar al-Khair	Ba'ath Party
156	Latakia	B	Salim Abboud	Ba'ath Party
157	Latakia	B	Fatima Fwaiti	Ba'ath Party
158	Latakia	B	Khaldoun Qassam	Ba'ath Party
159	Latakia	B	Nawfal Nawfal	Arab Socialist Union Party
160	Latakia	B	Abd al-Razzaq Darji	Communist (Bakdash)
161	Latakia	B	Sari Haddad	Socialist Unionist
162	Latakia	B	Mahdi Khairbek	Independent
163	Idlib	A	Sobhi al-Abdallah	Ba'ath Party
164	Idlib	A	Muhammad Sharhouli	Ba'ath Party
165	Idlib	A	Sameer Baydoun	Ba'ath Party
166	Idlib	A	Muhammad Zaher al-Yousefi	Socialist Unionist
167	Idlib	A	Huda Hijazi	Ba'ath Party
168	Idlib	A	Iman Khan Sheikhouni	Ba'ath Party
169	Idlib	A	Ibrahim Haj Abd al-Aziz	Ba'ath Party
170	Idlib	A	Ahmad al-Mubarak	Ba'ath Party
171	Idlib	A	Safwan Qarbi	Ba'ath Party
172	Idlib	A	Muhammad Muti Mouayyad	Socialist Unionist
173	Idlib	A	Muhammad al-Omar	Independent
174	Idlib	A	Abd al-Razzaq al-Yousef	Independent
175	Idlib	B	Sobhi Hamida	Ba'ath Party
176	Idlib	B	Muhammad Salim Zakour	Ba'ath Party
177	Idlib	B	Muhammad Haj Hamida Beitar	Socialist Unionist
178	Idlib	B	Muhammad Zuhair al-Yousef	Ba'ath Party
179	Idlib	B	Muhammad Akram al-Jundi	Independent
180	Idlib	B	Samer Habal	Independent
181	Tartus	A	Ali Ali	Ba'ath Party
182	Tartus	A	Fahima Arous	Ba'ath Party
183	Tartus	A	Abd al-Karim Mustafa	Ba'ath Party
184	Tartus	A	Rami Saleh	Ba'ath Party
185	Tartus	A	Ibrahim Suleiman	Ba'ath Party
186	Tartus	A	Numan Hamoud	Independent
187	Tartus	B	Imran al-Zawi	Ba'ath Party
188	Tartus	B	Bassam Dakrouj	Ba'ath Party
189	Tartus	B	Mona al-Dayaa	Ba'ath Party
190	Tartus	B	Mai Issa	Socialist Unionist
191	Tartus	B	Jamal Akrah	Socialist Unionist
192	Tartus	B	Khadr Hussein	Independent
193	Tartus	B	Ahmad Fahl	Independent
194	Raqqa	A	Hind al-Tarif	Ba'ath Party
195	Raqqa	A	Ali al-Ali al-Jasham	Ba'ath Party
196	Raqqa	A	Haitham Mashouh	Ba'ath Party
197	Raqqa	A	Abd al-Mohsen al-Rakan	Independent
198	Raqqa	B	Aziz al-Faza	Ba'ath Party
199	Raqqa	B	Khadr al-Sheikh al-Hussein	Ba'ath Party
200	Raqqa	B	Ismail al-Moussa	Socialist Unionist
201	Raqqa	B	Muhammad al-Huwaidi	Independent
202	Deir ez-Zor	A	Hamid Sheihan	Ba'ath Party
203	Deir ez-Zor	A	Ahmad al-Muhammad	Ba'ath Party
204	Deir ez-Zor	A	Riad al-Ismail	Ba'ath Party
205	Deir ez-Zor	A	Fayyad al-Sheikh	Ba'ath Party
206	Deir ez-Zor	A	Farha al-Alwan	Ba'ath Party
207	Deir ez-Zor	A	Ramadan al-Khalaf	Independent
208	Deir ez-Zor	A	Faisal Sheikh Fayyad	Independent
209	Deir ez-Zor	A	Najm al-Abdallah	Independent
210	Deir ez-Zor	B	Ishaq al-Saleh al-Jassem	Ba'ath Party
211	Deir ez-Zor	B	Ghassan al-Yousef	National Covenant
212	Deir ez-Zor	B	Sobhi Khadr al-Hammadi	Socialist Unionist
213	Deir ez-Zor	B	Muhammad al-Futaih	Ba'ath Party
214	Deir ez-Zor	B	Khalil al-Hafl	Independent
215	Deir ez-Zor	B	Faisal al-Najras	Independent
216	Al-Hasakah	A	Abdallah Khalil	Communist (Bakdash)
217	Al-Hasakah	A	Taha Shalash	Ba'ath Party
218	Al-Hasakah	A	Hammouda Sabbagh	Ba'ath Party
219	Al-Hasakah	A	Abboud al-Shawakh	Ba'ath Party
220	Al-Hasakah	A	Hammad al-Saud	Ba'ath Party
221	Al-Hasakah	A	Najah Kouriya	Ba'ath Party
222	Al-Hasakah	A	Sattam al-Dandah	Ba'ath Party
223	Al-Hasakah	A	Ziya Malek Ismail	Independent
224	Al-Hasakah	B	Khalaf al-Fallaj	Ba'ath Party
225	Al-Hasakah	B	Ahmad al-Wakkaa	Ba'ath Party
226	Al-Hasakah	B	Abd al-Rahman Issa	Socialist Unionist
227	Al-Hasakah	B	Muhammad Abd al-Rahman	Independent
228	Al-Hasakah	B	Muhammad al-Musallat al-Melhem	Independent
229	Al-Hasakah	B	Abd al-Razzaq al-Issa	Independent
230	Daraa	A	Mahmoud Khair al-Zoubi	Ba'ath Party
231	Daraa	A	Ali Arafat	Ba'ath Party
232	Daraa	A	Ahmad al-Miqdad	Ba'ath Party
233	Daraa	A	Khaled al-Abboud	Socialist Unionist
234	Daraa	A	Youssef Abu Rumiya al-Saadi	Independent
235	Daraa	B	Fawaz al-Mahamid	Ba'ath Party
236	Daraa	B	Raida al-Ghanem	Ba'ath Party
237	Daraa	B	Abdallah al-Nasrallah	Independent
238	Daraa	B	Khalil al-Rifaei	Independent
239	Daraa	B	Naser al-Hariri	Independent
240	Suwayda	A	Siham al-Jabr Abu Fakhr	Ba'ath Party
241	Suwayda	A	Sameer Hassoun	Ba'ath Party
242	Suwayda	A	Fares Abd al-Din	Ba'ath Party
243	Suwayda	A	Abdallah al-Atrash	Independent
244	Suwayda	B	Mufid Abu Hamdan	Ba'ath Party
245	Suwayda	B	Kamal Amer	Independent
246	Quneitra	A	Moussa Ahmad	Ba'ath Party
247	Quneitra	A	Leifen Shourah	Ba'ath Party
248	Quneitra	A	Jihad Ismail	Independent
249	Quneitra	B	Ismail Marai	Ba'ath Party
250	Quneitra	B	Nasr al-Din Khairallah	Ba'ath Party

== By-elections ==
Electoral district	Date	Previous incumbent	Party	Winner	Party	Cause
Aleppo	7 September 2007	Abd al-Aziz al-Shami	Independent	Mohammed Anas al-Shami	Independent	Death.
Aleppo	7 September 2007	Hilal Zayn al-Din	Independent	Alaa Zayn al-Din	Independent	Death.
Deir ez-Zor	25 June 2008	Faisal al-Najras	Independent	Safouk al-Najras	Independent	Death.
Rif Dimashq	18 August 2008	Abdallah Sharha	ASU	Fayez al-Safadi	ASU	Death.
Deir ez-Zor	9 May 2009	Ramadan al-Khalaf	Independent	Ziad al-Khalaf	Independent	Death.
Damascus	11 May 2011	Huda al-Homsi	Ba'ath Party	Majda Qteit	Ba'ath Party	Resigned after being appointed an ambassador to Greece.
Districts of Aleppo Governorate	1 November 2009	Diab al-Mashi	Independent	Mohammed Khair al-Mashi	Independent	Death.
Damascus	27 December 2009	Muhammad Nabil al-Khatib	Ba'ath Party	Salah al-Din al-Sadat	Ba'ath Party	Resigned after being appointed head of the Central Authority for Supervision and Inspection.
Aleppo	20 April 2010	Abd al-Fattah Azzouz	Socialist Unionist	Thanaa Fakhr al-Din	ASU	Death.
Deir ez-Zor	2 May 2010	Faisal Sheikh Fayyad	Independent	Mahna Sheikh Fayyad	Independent	Death.
Aleppo	9 May 2010	Adnan al-Sukhni	Ba'ath Party	Muhammad Zaki Hakim	Ba'ath Party	Resigned after being appointed governor of Raqqa.
