= List of members of the People's Assembly (Syria), 2003–2007 =

This is a list of members elected to the 8th People's Assembly, following the 2003 parliamentary election.

== Members ==
No.	Electoral district	Sector	Name	Party
1	Damascus	A	Suleiman Haddad	Ba'ath Party
2	Damascus	A	Amira Urabi	
3	Damascus	A	Huda al-Homsi	Ba'ath Party
4	Damascus	A	Muhammad Khaled Najati	
5	Damascus	A	Huda Mleihi	Ba'ath Party
6	Damascus	A	Muhammad Ammar Saati	Ba'ath Party
7	Damascus	A	Nabil Dawoud	Independent
8	Damascus	A	Muhammad al-Habash	Independent
9	Damascus	A	Basil Dahdouh	
10	Damascus	A	Ghalib Aneez	Independent
11	Damascus	B	Muhammad Farouk Abu al-Shamat	Ba'ath Party
12	Damascus	B	Muhammad Issam al-Jammal	
13	Damascus	B	Muhammad al-Hallaq	
14	Damascus	B	Mai al-Muhaini	
15	Damascus	B	Haneen Nimr	Communist (Bakdash)
16	Damascus	B	Marwan al-Bunni	Socialist Unionist
17	Damascus	B	Zakaria Mir Alam	
18	Damascus	B	Ammar Bakdash	Communist (Bakdash)
19	Damascus	B	Mahmoud al-Abrash	Ba'ath Party
20	Damascus	B	Abd al-Qadir Qaddura	Ba'ath Party
21	Damascus	B	Muhammad Hamsho	Independent
22	Damascus	B	Muhammad Zaher Daabul	Independent
23	Damascus	B	Muhyi al-Din al-Habboush	
24	Damascus	B	Joseph Sweid	SSNP
25	Damascus	B	Adnan al-Dakhakhni	Independent
26	Damascus	B	Baha al-Din al-Hassan	Independent
27	Damascus	B	Ghassan al-Nahhas	
28	Damascus	B	Hashem al-Aqqad	Independent
29	Damascus	B	Muhammad Radwan al-Masri	Independent
30	Rif Dimashq	A	Salah Taame	Ba'ath Party
31	Rif Dimashq	A	Ibrahim Shamieh	
32	Rif Dimashq	A	Sabah Hammoudeh	
33	Rif Dimashq	A	Jadallah Qaddour	Arab Socialist Movement
34	Rif Dimashq	A	Mustafa Jabr	
35	Rif Dimashq	A	Sameera Kashka	
36	Rif Dimashq	A	Izdihar Maatouq	
37	Rif Dimashq	A	Hamza Munther	Ba'ath Party
38	Rif Dimashq	A	Abd al-Aziz Maqali	Independent
39	Rif Dimashq	A	Muhammad Anwar Ubayd	
40	Rif Dimashq	B	Adnan Arabsh	
41	Rif Dimashq	B	Nizar al-Assassi	
42	Rif Dimashq	B	Ahmad Ahmad al-Dalati	Independent
43	Rif Dimashq	B	Ahmad Khalil	Ba'ath Party
44	Rif Dimashq	B	Maan Barakat	
45	Rif Dimashq	B	Atif al-Naddaf	Ba'ath Party
46	Rif Dimashq	B	Abd al-Rahman al-Ahmar	Independent
47	Rif Dimashq	B	Muhammad Omar Buqai	
48	Rif Dimashq	B	Omar al-Hallaq	
49	Aleppo	A	Muhammad Shaban Azzouz	Ba'ath Party
50	Aleppo	A	Muhammad Safi Abu Dan	
51	Aleppo	A	Suhail Muhmandar	
52	Aleppo	A	Ferial Siris	
53	Aleppo	A	Ahmad Dabbas	
54	Aleppo	A	Abd al-Aziz al-Shami	Independent
55	Aleppo	A	Abd al-Rahman Salqini	
56	Aleppo	B	Adnan al-Sukhni	
57	Aleppo	B	Mahmoud Mumtaz Sultan	
58	Aleppo	B	Muhammad Naji al-Otari	Ba'ath Party
59	Aleppo	B	Haitham Sousli	
60	Aleppo	B	Mahmoud al-Wahab	
61	Aleppo	B	Edward Khouly	
62	Aleppo	B	Sonbol Sonbolian	Independent
63	Aleppo	B	Abdallah Mousalli	
64	Aleppo	B	Khaled Alabi	Independent
65	Aleppo	B	Ahmad Berri	
66	Aleppo	B	Muhammad Adel Jamous	
67	Aleppo	B	Hisham Khankan	
68	Aleppo	B	Muhammad Saleh al-Mallah	
69	Districts of Aleppo Governorate	A	Muhammad Hassan Rashid	
70	Districts of Aleppo Governorate	A	Badriya Sheihan	
71	Districts of Aleppo Governorate	A	Muhammad al-Sattam	
72	Districts of Aleppo Governorate	A	Muhammad Hilal	
73	Districts of Aleppo Governorate	A	Mustafa al-Oweid	Ba'ath Party
74	Districts of Aleppo Governorate	A	Muhammad Jamal Hassou	
75	Districts of Aleppo Governorate	A	Abdo Assaf	
76	Districts of Aleppo Governorate	A	Hassan Taleb	
77	Districts of Aleppo Governorate	A	Aqil al-Alawi	Ba'ath Party
78	Districts of Aleppo Governorate	A	Eid Muhammad	
79	Districts of Aleppo Governorate	A	Muhammad Asaad al-Asaad	
80	Districts of Aleppo Governorate	A	Hassan Salloum	Ba'ath Party
81	Districts of Aleppo Governorate	A	Diab al-Mashi	Independent
82	Districts of Aleppo Governorate	A	Abidin Arabo	
83	Districts of Aleppo Governorate	A	Khalil al-Safouk	
84	Districts of Aleppo Governorate	A	Riad Haj Hassan	
85	Districts of Aleppo Governorate	A	Muhammad al-Bish	
86	Districts of Aleppo Governorate	B	Ismat Mahalli	Ba'ath Party
87	Districts of Aleppo Governorate	B	Abdullah Sallum Abdullah	Socialist Unionist
88	Districts of Aleppo Governorate	B	Fatinah al-Ahmad	
89	Districts of Aleppo Governorate	B	Sawsan Hudhaifa	
90	Districts of Aleppo Governorate	B	Ahmad Haj Suleiman	Ba'ath Party
91	Districts of Aleppo Governorate	B	Nasser Qaddour	
92	Districts of Aleppo Governorate	B	Ahmad Haji Mahmoud	Ba'ath Party
93	Districts of Aleppo Governorate	B	Ahmad Munir Muhammad	Ba'ath Party
94	Districts of Aleppo Governorate	B	Radwan al-Habib	Ba'ath Party
95	Districts of Aleppo Governorate	B	Ismat Ghabari	
96	Districts of Aleppo Governorate	B	Abd al-Qadir Nanaa	
97	Districts of Aleppo Governorate	B	Muhammad Melhem	
98	Districts of Aleppo Governorate	B	Abd al-Hadi al-Jammal	
99	Districts of Aleppo Governorate	B	Muhammad Safwan Khallou	
100	Districts of Aleppo Governorate	B	Muhammad Naasan	
101	Homs	A	Ibtisam al-Sayyid Suleiman	
102	Homs	A	Bushra Masouh	
103	Homs	A	Muhadhdhab Rajoub	
104	Homs	A	Muhammad Ghassan al-Masri	
105	Homs	A	Ammar Daraq al-Sibai	
106	Homs	A	Muhammad Hassan al-Daroubi	
107	Homs	A	Umaima Khaddour	
108	Homs	A	Mahmoud al-Fadous	Independent
109	Homs	A	Abd al-Karim al-Melhem	
110	Homs	A	Abd al-Aziz al-Mulhim	Ba'ath Party
111	Homs	A	Zuhair Tarraf	Independent
112	Homs	B	Muhammad al-Asaad	Ba'ath Party
113	Homs	B	Adnan al-Ahdab	
114	Homs	B	Jirjis al-Shannour	
115	Homs	B	Khadr al-Naim	
116	Homs	B	Shaban Shaheen	
117	Homs	B	Motaz Ebara	
118	Homs	B	Ahmad Qasham	Ba'ath Party
119	Homs	B	Abdallah Tlass	
120	Homs	B	Shahadeh Mayhoub	Independent
121	Homs	B	Ahmad al-Sheikh	Independent
122	Homs	B	Abdo al-Najib	Independent
123	Homs	B	Muhammad Zuhair Ghanoum	
124	Hama	A	Nadim Maryam	Ba'ath Party
125	Hama	A	Sameer Qandaji	
126	Hama	A	Souad al-Sheikh Bakkour	Ba'ath Party
127	Hama	A	Kulthoum Wardeh	Ba'ath Party
128	Hama	A	Muhammad Said	
129	Hama	A	Ahmad al-Shami	
130	Hama	A	Abd al-Hadi Abd al-Karim	
131	Hama	A	Seifo Ahmad	
132	Hama	A	Ibrahim Ali Ibrahim	
133	Hama	A	Hashem al-Zaeem	
134	Hama	A	Ibrahim Khalil	
135	Hama	A	Abd al-Karim al-Ismail	Independent
136	Hama	A	Khaled Muhammad	Independent
137	Hama	B	Jihad Murad	Ba'ath Party
138	Hama	B	Hussein Farzat	Arab Socialist Movement
139	Hama	B	Younes Nassif	
140	Hama	B	Walid Fares	
141	Hama	B	Faisal Kulthoum	
142	Hama	B	Mona Salameh	
143	Hama	B	Ibrahim al-Asmar	Independent
144	Hama	B	Muhammad al-Hamido	
145	Hama	B	Ahmad al-Khattab	
146	Latakia	A	Youssef Hassan	
147	Latakia	A	Yahya Ayyash	
148	Latakia	A	Adnan Beitar	Ba'ath Party
149	Latakia	A	Ahmad Diwani	
150	Latakia	A	Abd al-Qadir Bazido	
151	Latakia	A	Bilal Mathbout	
152	Latakia	A	Rafiq Darwish	
153	Latakia	A	Fawaz Nassour	Independent
154	Latakia	A	Nizar Ismail	
155	Latakia	B	Jamil al-Assad	Ba'ath Party
156	Latakia	B	Mahmoud Alio	
157	Latakia	B	Ibrahim Baddour	Ba'ath Party
158	Latakia	B	Suhair Reis	
159	Latakia	B	Labib Alia	
160	Latakia	B	Josephine Nassar	
161	Latakia	B	Namir Ghanem	
162	Latakia	B	Suhail Othman	
163	Idlib	A	Marwan al-Najm	
164	Idlib	A	Ahmad Shafi Kayyali	Ba'ath Party
165	Idlib	A	Abbas al-Faris	
166	Idlib	A	Huda Hijazi	Ba'ath Party
167	Idlib	A	Sobhi al-Abdallah	Ba'ath Party
168	Idlib	A	Nafidha Nibal al-Muallem	
169	Idlib	A	Abd al-Qadir Hanas	
170	Idlib	A	Ahmad Yousfi	
171	Idlib	A	Ahmad al-Mubarak	Ba'ath Party
172	Idlib	A	Ihsan Mohsen	
173	Idlib	A	Abd al-Razzaq al-Yousef	Independent
174	Idlib	A	Salah al-Din Ali al-Sheikh	
175	Idlib	B	Muhammad Nihad Mishantat	
176	Idlib	B	Safwan Qarbi	Ba'ath Party
177	Idlib	B	Abd al-Nasser Hamidan	
178	Idlib	B	Muhammad Jamal Ghazzal	
179	Idlib	B	Muhammad Akram al-Jundi	Independent
180	Idlib	B	Abd al-Basit al-Hishoum	
181	Tartus	A	Ramadan Atiya	
182	Tartus	A	Hisham Tayyara	
183	Tartus	A	Ibrahim Suleiman	Ba'ath Party
184	Tartus	A	Waad Khaddam	
185	Tartus	A	Riham Bashour	
186	Tartus	A	Inam Abbas	
187	Tartus	B	Izz al-Din Imran	
188	Tartus	B	Najah Younes	
189	Tartus	B	Ahmad Ghazil	
190	Tartus	B	Wajih Hashem	
191	Tartus	B	George Jabbour	
192	Tartus	B	Khadr Hussein	Independent
193	Tartus	B	Muhammad Suleiman	Ba'ath Party
194	Raqqa	A	Nadwa al-Salloum	
195	Raqqa	A	Ali al-Ali al-Jasham	Ba'ath Party
196	Raqqa	A	Khalil al-Moussa	
197	Raqqa	A	Muhammad al-Ayed al-Bari	
198	Raqqa	B	Abdallah al-Hassan	
199	Raqqa	B	Khalaf al-Khalaf al-Allan	
200	Raqqa	B	Ismail al-Ubayd al-Abd al-Hajou	
201	Raqqa	B	Muhammad al-Huwaidi	Independent
202	Deir ez-Zor	A	Hadiya Abbas	Ba'ath Party
203	Deir ez-Zor	A	Abboud al-Saleh	Ba'ath Party
204	Deir ez-Zor	A	Ahmad al-Hammad	
205	Deir ez-Zor	A	Nasser Ubayd al-Nasser	
206	Deir ez-Zor	A	Ziad Baaj	
207	Deir ez-Zor	A	Naji al-Sheikh Fares	
208	Deir ez-Zor	A	Saleh al-Bashir	
209	Deir ez-Zor	A	Ayman Raja al-Muhammad al-Dandal	
210	Deir ez-Zor	B	Hamoud al-Hussein	
211	Deir ez-Zor	B	Fayyad al-Sheikh	Ba'ath Party
212	Deir ez-Zor	B	Fouad Battah	
213	Deir ez-Zor	B	Abd al-Razzaq al-Awwad	
214	Deir ez-Zor	B	Khalil al-Hafl	Independent
215	Deir ez-Zor	B	Faisal al-Najras	Independent
216	Al-Hasakah	A	Nasser Abd al-Aziz	
217	Al-Hasakah	A	Ahmad al-Attiya	
218	Al-Hasakah	A	Abdallah Bazou	
219	Al-Hasakah	A	Hamoud al-Shabib	
220	Al-Hasakah	A	Elizabeth Maliki	
221	Al-Hasakah	A	Muhammad Shams al-Din	
222	Al-Hasakah	A	Hussein al-Muhammad	
223	Al-Hasakah	A	Ali al-Aazel	
224	Al-Hasakah	B	Muhammad al-Ali	
225	Al-Hasakah	B	Shifan al-Ali	
226	Al-Hasakah	B	Suhail Arousi	
227	Al-Hasakah	B	Issam Baghdadi	
228	Al-Hasakah	B	Hatem al-Zaher	
229	Al-Hasakah	B	Muhammad al-Musallat al-Melhem	Independent
230	Daraa	A	Ibtisam al-Samadi	
231	Daraa	A	Ali Arafat	Ba'ath Party
232	Daraa	A	Farid al-Akka	
233	Daraa	A	Khaled al-Abboud	Socialist Unionist
234	Daraa	A	Farouq al-Hamadi	
235	Daraa	B	Muhammad al-Harib	
236	Daraa	B	Nayef Abazid	
237	Daraa	B	Moussa al-Zoubi	
238	Daraa	B	Qassem Idris	
239	Daraa	B	Khalil al-Rifaei	Independent
240	Suwayda	A	Hamad Abu Tafesh	
241	Suwayda	A	Sabir Falhout	Ba'ath Party
242	Suwayda	A	Hassan Azzam	
243	Suwayda	A	Abdallah al-Atrash	Independent
244	Suwayda	B	Hanan Amro	
245	Suwayda	B	Kamal Amer	Independent
246	Quneitra	A	Muhammad al-Fashtaki	
247	Quneitra	A	Sharaf al-Din Abaza	
248	Quneitra	A	Muhammad al-Issa	
249	Quneitra	B	Nasr al-Din Khairallah	Ba'ath Party
250	Quneitra	B	Ismail Marai	Ba'ath Party

== By-elections ==
Electoral district	Date	Previous incumbent	Party	Winner	Party	Cause
Aleppo	25 February 2005	Ahmad Berri		Majd al-Din Hawi		Death.
Latakia	5 March 2005	Jamil al-Assad	Ba'ath Party	Jaafar al-Khair	Ba'ath Party	Death.
Rif Dimashq	11 May 2005	Ahmad Khalil		Imad al-Azab		Resigned after being appointed governor of Rif Dimashq
Rif Dimashq	11 May 2005	Abd al-Rahman al-Ahmar	Independent	Mowaffaq al-Habashi	Independent	Death.
Rif Dimashq	27 September 2005	Atif al-Naddaf	Ba'ath Party	Nazih Abboud	Ba'ath Party	Resigned after being appointed governor of Idlib.
Deir ez-Zor	4 March 2006	Naji al-Sheikh Fares		Nayef al-Sheikh Fares		Death.
