= 9th People's Assembly of Syria =

Legislative term of Syria's parliament from 2007 to 2012

9th People's Assembly
←	8th	1st	→

Overview
- Legislative body: People's Assembly
- Jurisdiction: Syria
- Meeting place: People's Assembly Building, Damascus
- Term: 7 May 2007 – 14 May 2012
- Election: 2007
- Government: al-Otari (until 14 April 2011); Safar (from 14 April 2011)
- Members: 250
- Speaker: Mahmoud al-Abrash (Ba'ath Party)

Sessions
- 1st: ? – ?
- 2nd: ? – ?
- 3rd: ? – ?
- 4th: ? – ?
- 5th: ? – ?
- 6th: ? – ?
- 7th: ? – ?
- 8th: ? – ?
- 9th: ? – ?
- 10th: ? – ?
- 11th: ? – ?
- 12th: ? – ?
- 13th: ? – ?

Special sessions
- 1st: 7 May 2007 – ?

The Ninth People's Assembly (Arabic: مجلس الشعب للدور التشريعي التاسع, romanized: Majlis al-Shaʿb lil-dawr al-tashrīʿī al-tāsiʿ) was the ninth legislative term of the People's Assembly of Syria, and the eighteenth in Syria's republican history. It sat from 7 May 2007 until 14 May 2012 and was the final parliament elected under the 1973 Constitution.

== Elections and formation ==
Legislative elections were held on 22–23 April 2007. The newly elected assembly, composed of 250 members including 31 women, convened for its first session on 7 May 2007. Its membership represented the parties of the National Progressive Front, including the Arab Socialist Ba'ath Party, the Syrian Communist Party (Bakdash), the Syrian Communist Party (Unified), the Arab Socialist Union, the Socialist Unionists, the Democratic Socialist Unionist Party, the Arab Socialist Movement, the Arab Democratic Union Party, the Syrian Social Nationalist Party, the National Covenant Party, as well as independent deputies.

== Bureau ==
Position	Name	Party	Tenure
Speaker	Mahmoud al-Abrash	Ba'ath Party	7 May 2007 – 14 May 2012
Deputy Speaker	Radwan al-Habib	Ba'ath Party	7 May 2007 – 14 May 2012
Secretary	Hassan al-Saqqa	Ba'ath Party	7 May 2007 – 14 May 2012
Secretary	Haneen Nimr	Communist (Bakdash)	7 May 2007 – 17 May 2008
Secretary	Khaled al-Abboud	Socialist Unionist	18 May 2008 – 14 May 2012
Overseer	Muhammad al-Habash	Independent	7 May 2007 – 17 May 2008
Overseer	Mahdi Khairbek	Independent	7 May 2007 – 14 May 2012
Overseer	Abdallah al-Atrash	Independent	18 May 2008 – 14 May 2012

== Political developments ==
The legislative term coincided with major political developments in Syria. In March 2011, protests began as part of the broader regional upheavals, prompting a series of legislative and constitutional reforms. President al-Assad addressed the assembly on 30 March 2011 regarding the internal situation and regional developments.

In November 2011, a national committee was established to draft a new constitution. A constitutional referendum was held on 26 February 2012, and the new constitution entered into force the following day, replacing the 1973 Constitution.

== Major Legislation ==
- Law No. 33 of 9 December 2007 issuing the Commercial Law
- Law No. 41 of 21 December 2007 establishing the General Authority for Taxes and Fees
- Law No. 2 of 10 March 2008 issuing the Consumer Protection Law
- Law No. 15 of 9 July 2008 establishing the Real Estate Development and Investment Authority
- Law No. 2 pf 11 January 2009 regulating Tourism Offices
- Law No. 27 of 2 November 2009establishing the Syrian Exporters Union
- Law No. 1 of 5 January 2010 amending the Code of Civil Procedure

== Extension of the term ==
The assembly's term was originally scheduled to expire in May 2011. However, its mandate was extended beyond its constitutional duration due to the failure to hold legislative elections on schedule. In accordance with Article 58 of the 1973 Constitution, which provides that an assembly remains in session until a successor is seated, the body automatically retained its authority. It resumed its sessions in August 2011 and remained in office until a new assembly was elected in May 2012.
