= George Soumi =

Syrian politician (born 1943)

George Malki Soumi

Minister of Irrigation
- In office 14 April 2011 – 23 June 2012
- Prime Minister: Adel Safar
- Preceded by: self
- Succeeded by: none, office abolished

Minister of Irrigation
- In office 3 October 2010 – 29 March 2011
- President: Bashar al-Assad
- Prime Minister: Muhammad Naji al-Otari
- Preceded by: Nader al-Bunni
- Succeeded by: self

Personal details
- Born: 1943 (age 82–83) Qamishli, Syria
- Party: Syrian Regional Branch of the Arab Socialist Ba'ath Party
- Children: three
- Education: Moscow Scientific Research Institute of Hydrotechnics and Land Reclamation

George Malki Soumi (born 1943) is a Syrian government appointee, who served as the Minister of Irrigation of Syria (2010-2012). He is an expert in irrigation and land reclamation.

== Early life, education and career ==
Soumi was born in Qamishli in 1943. He earned a PhD. in Technical Sciences in the field of irrigation and land reclamation at the Moscow Scientific Research Institute of Hydrotechnics and Land Reclamation in 1975.

- Director of Irrigation and Water Use Directorate at the Ministry of Agriculture, 1986-2003
- Member of the Board of Trustees of the International Center for Agricultural Research in the Dry Areas (ICARDA)
- Head of the Arab Team for Rationalization of Water Use in Arab Agriculture of the Arab Organization for Agricultural Development
- Expert at the UN in the field of Integrated Management of Water Resources
- Expert at the State Planning Commission
- Worked with the International Fund for Agricultural Development on water situation in the Northeastern region
- Worked as consultant at the Irrigation Committee at the People's Assembly
- Has over 265 publications in the field of water research

His second term was ended when The Ministry of Irrigation was abolished on June 23, 2012, by Legislative Decree No. 44/2012, which created the Ministry of Water Resources as its successor.

In 2025 the Ministry of Water Resources was merged together with the Oil/Minerals into a new Ministry of Energy.

== Personal life ==
Soumi is married and has a son Marvin and two daughters Marina and Georgette.

== See also ==
- Cabinet of Syria
