= Hala Mohammad al-Nasser =

Syrian politician (born 1964)

Minister of Housing and Construction
- In office 14 April 2011 – 23 June 2012
- Prime Minister: Adel Safar
- Preceded by: Omar Ibrahim Ghalawanji
- Succeeded by: Mansour Fadlallah Azzam

Personal details
- Born: 1964 (age 61–62) Raqqa Governorate, Syria
- Party: Baath Arab Socialist Party
- Children: Three
- Education: University of Aleppo
- Profession: Civil engineer

Hala Mohammad al-Nasser (Arabic: هلا محمد الناصر; born 1964) is the former Minister of Housing and Construction of Syria, having served between 2011 and 2012.

== Early life, education and career ==
Al-Nasser was born in the Raqqa Governorate in 1964. She earned a degree in civil engineering from the University of Aleppo in 1991. She became assistant director of technical services in Raqqa in 1992. On 26 December 2009 she was appointed Chief Engineer of Syria.

She is a member of the Branch Association of Engineers, a member of the General Federation of Women's Council, and a member of the General Conference of the Association of Engineers. She became a member of the Raqqa Branch leadership of the Arab Socialist Ba'ath Party in 2002, and a member of the Committee Central to the Ba'ath Party in 2005.

== Personal life ==
Al-Nasser is married and has three children.

== See also ==
- Cabinet of Syria
