= Mansour Fadlallah Azzam =

Syrian politician (born 1960)

Mansour Fadlallah Azzam منصور فضل الله عزام

Minister of Presidential Affairs
- In office 14 April 2011 – 13 December 2023
- Prime Minister: Adel Safar; Riyad Farid Hijab; Wael Nader al-Halqi; Imad Khamis; Hussein Arnous
- Preceded by: Himself
- Succeeded by: Ministry abolished
- In office 23 April 2009 – 29 March 2011
- President: Bashar al-Assad
- Prime Minister: Mohammad Najji Outri
- Succeeded by: Himself

Minister of Public Works and Housing
- In office 23 June 2012 – 9 February 2013
- Prime Minister: Riyad Farid Hijab; Wael Nader al-Halqi
- Preceded by: Office Established
- Succeeded by: Hussein Arnous

Personal details
- Born: 1960 (age 65–66) As-Suweida, As-Suwayda Governorate, UAR
- Children: Three
- Education: University of Damascus

Mansour Fadlallah Azzam (born 1960) was the Minister of Presidential Affairs of Syria, between 2009 and 2023.

== Early life, education and career ==
Azzam is a Syrian Druze born in Sweida. He earned a bachelor's degree in French literature from the University of Damascus in 1983, followed by a Diploma in Translation and Arabization in the French language from the same school in 1985. He also earned a Diploma in International Relations from the National Institute of Public Administration in Paris.

In 1994, he took a diplomatic post in the Ministry of Foreign Affairs. From 1995 to 2000 he worked at the Embassy of Syria, Washington, D.C. as administrator of cultural affairs and U.S. Congress affairs. From 2000 to 2002 he was an adviser in the Ministry of Foreign Affairs and deputy director of Protocol. From 2003 to 2008 he was deputy director of the Presidency of the ceremony, and then appointed Secretary of the Presidency.

His term as minister of public works ended on 9 February 2013.

== Personal life ==
Azzam is married and has three daughters.

== See also ==
- Cabinet of Syria
