= Ministry of Electricity (Syria) =

Government ministry of Syria

- وزارة الكهرباء

Agency overview
- Formed: 1976
- Dissolved: 2025
- Superseding agency: Ministry of Energy
- Jurisdiction: Government of Syria
- Headquarters: Damascus
- Website: www.moe.gov.sy

The Ministry of Electricity (Arabic: وزارة الكهرباء, romanized: Wizārat al-Kahrabāʼ) was a department of the Government of Syria. The ministry was responsible for managing the electric energy and renewable energy sector in Syria, and a number of governmental institutions and companies were affiliated to it. On 29 March 2025, as a result of the formation of the Syrian transitional government, the Ministry of Electricity, the Ministry of Water Resources and the Ministry of Oil and Mineral Resources were replaced by and merged into the Ministry of Energy.

In Syria, the production of electricity has been entirely nationalized. By the end of the 1990s, the Ministry of Electricity managed 74,9% of the production of electricity nationwide. The country was planning to become self-sufficient in electricity supply by 1998. For this reason, the Ministry never seriously considered renewable energies because they take a longer time to deploy. By 2010, the government encouraged private investors to develop the electric capacity of the country, but the war broke out.

In November 2021, the Ministry of Electricity annulled dozens of renewable energy licences.

== Ministers ==
Minister	Government	Term
Minister of Electricity
Ahmed Omar Youssef (first)	Abdul Rahman Khleifawi government Muhammad Ali al-Halabi government Abdul Rauf al-Kasm government	1976 to 1984
Kamel Selim al-Baba	Abdul Rauf al-Kasm government Mahmoud al-Zoubi government	1984 to 2000
Munib Saim ad-Dahr	First Mustafa Mero government Second Mustafa Mero government Muhammad Naji al-Otari government	2000 to 2006
Ahmed Khaled al-Ali	Muhammad Naji al-Otari government	2006 to 2008
Ahmed Qusay Kayali	Muhammad Naji al-Otari government	2008 to 2011
Imad Khamis	Adel Safar government Riyad Hijab government First Wael al-Halqi government Second Wael al-Halqi government	2011 to 2016
Muhammad Zuhair al-Kharbutli	Imad Khamis government	2016 to 2020
Ghassan al-Zamel	First Hussein Arnous government Second Hussein Arnous government	2020 to 2024
Sinjar Taama	Mohammad Ghazi al-Jalali government	September 2024 to December 2024
Omar Shaqrouq (last)	Syrian caretaker government	December 2024 to 29 March 2025

== See also ==
- Council of Ministers (Syria)
