= Ghiath Jeraatli =

Minister of State
- In office 14 April 2011 – incumbent
- President: Bashar al-Assad
- Prime Minister: Adel Safar

Personal details
- Born: 1950 (age 75–76) Salamiyah, Syria
- Education: University of Aleppo
- Profession: architect

Ghiath Jeraatli (born 1950) has been a Syrian Minister of State since 2011.

== History ==
Jeraatli was born in 1950. He earned a degree in architecture at the University of Aleppo in 1975. He worked in an enterprise investment in the Euphrates basin in 1975, and practiced engineering work in his own office since 1981. He is a member of the General Conference of the Syndicate of Engineers, a member of the Department of Architecture and a member of the Committee on Media and Publishing in the union branch in Aleppo. He holds the rank of engineer opinion by resolution 1997 of the Engineers Association.

== See also ==
- Cabinet of Syria
