= Abdul-Razzaq Sheikh Issa =

Abdul-Razzaq Sheikh Issa عبد الرزاق شيخ عيسى

Minister of Higher Education
- In office 14 April 2011 – 23 June 2012
- President: Bashar al-Assad
- Prime Minister: Adel Safar
- Preceded by: Ghiath Barakat

Personal details
- Born: 1955 (age 70–71) Damascus, Syria
- Children: five
- Education: University of Lyon

Abdul-Razzaq Sheikh Issa (Arabic: عبد الرزاق شيخ عيسى) (born 1955) is the current president of Syrian Private University and a former Minister of Higher Education for Syria, serving from April 14, 2011, till June 23, 2012.

== Early life, education and career ==
Issa was born in Damascus in 1955.

- PhD in the Physiology of Digestion, 1988
- Diploma in Intensive Studies of Nutrition
- Awarded the Order of Academic Palms from France
- Secretary of Medicine Faculty, Damascus University, 1996-200
- Assistant Higher Education Minister, 2006-2008

== Personal life ==
Issa is married and has five children, two daughters and three sons.

== See also ==
- Cabinet of Syria
