= Saad Abdel-Salam al-Nayef =

Saad Abdel-Salam al-Nayef (born 1959) was the Minister of Health of Syria from August 25, 2012 to December 2024 when the Assad regime collapsed. He was appointed to the position after his predecessor, Wael Nader Al-Halqi, was appointed prime minister on 9 August 2012.

== Sanctions ==
On May 16, 2013, the United States Treasury Department designated four senior Syrian officials, including al-Nayef, for "backing the government of Bashar Al-Assad in suppressing people or involvement in terrorism".

== See also ==
- Cabinet of Syria
