= Kawkab Sabah al-Daya =

Minister of State for Environment Affairs
- In office 14 April 2011 – 23 June 2012
- President: Bashar al-Assad
- Prime Minister: Adel Safar
- Preceded by: self

Minister of State for Environment Affairs
- In office 23 April 2009 – 29 March 2011
- President: Bashar al-Assad
- Prime Minister: Mohammad Najji Outri
- Succeeded by: self

Personal details
- Born: Banias, Syria
- Party: Syrian Regional Branch of the Arab Socialist Ba'ath Party
- Children: three
- Education: University of Damascus

Kawkab Sabah al-Daya is a former Minister of State for Environment Affairs for Syria.

== Early life, education and career ==
Al-Daya was born in the Banias in 1962. She earned a pharmacy degree and a doctorate from the University of Damascus. She was a professor at the University of Damascus, appointed Associate Minister of Health in 1993, and Director of Health, Environment and Population Bureau in the General Federation of Women. She was appointed the first Minister of State for Environment Affairs on 23 April 2009, the day after Earth Day.

== Personal life ==
Al-Daya is married and has three children.

== See also ==
- Cabinet of Syria
