= Ministry of Irrigation (Syria) =

Government ministry of Syria

- وزارة الري

Agency overview
- Formed: 1982
- Preceding agency: Ministry of Euphrates Dam
- Dissolved: June 2012
- Superseding agency: Ministry of Water Resources
- Headquarters: Damascus
- Website: www.irrigation.gov.sy

The Ministry of Irrigation (Arabic: وزارة الري) of Syria was responsible managing Syria's water policies. It was established in 1982 as a replacement to the Ministry of Euphrates Dam. The ministry was abolished in June 2012, its agenda was taken over by the Ministry of Water Resources.

== Ministers of Irrigation ==
- Abdul Rahman al-Madani, (1982–2000)
- Taha al-Atrash, (2000 – 13 December 2001)
- Muhammad Radwan Martini (13 December 2001 – 10 September 2003)
- Nader al-Bunni (10 September 2003 – 3 October 2010)
- George Soumi (3 October 2010 – 23 June 2012)
