= Hassan al-Sari =

Minister of State

- حسان رشيد الصاري

Minister of State for Investment Affairs
- In office 14 April 2011 – 2012
- President: Bashar al-Assad
- Prime Minister: Adel Safar

Personal details
- Born: 1953 (age 72–73) Hama
- Party: Socialist Unionists
- Children: One
- Education: University of Damascus
- Profession: Poet, writer

Hassan Rashid al-Sari (born 1953) is a Syrian poet and writer who was a former Syrian Minister of State for investment affairs, who served sometime during 2006 and sometime starting from 2011 until 2012.

Al-Sari was born in 1953 in Hama. He earned a degree in Arabic at the University of Damascus in 1979. He is a poet and a member of the Arab Writers Union. He is a member of the Amin Hama branch of the Socialist Unionist Party and a member of the CPC Central Committee.

Al-Sari is married and has one child.

== See also ==
- Cabinet of Syria
