= Ghassan al-Zamel =

Syrian politician

His Excellency Ghassan al-Zamel
- غسان الزامل

Minister of Electricity
- In office 10 August 2020 – 23 September 2024
- President: Bashar al-Assad
- Prime Minister: Hussein Arnous
- Preceded by: Mohammad Zuhair Al-Kharbutli

Personal details
- Born: 1963 (age 62–63) Damascus, Damascus Governorate, Syria
- Education: Damascus University
- Profession: Politician, Civil servant

Ghassan al-Zamel (Arabic: غسان الزامل) (born 1963) is a Syrian politician who served as Minister of Electricity in the Second Hussein Arnous government.

== Early life, education and career ==
He was born in Damascus in 1963. A professor in electrical engineering from Damascus University in 1993.

He started his career at the General Company of Electricity in Daraa in 1995, served as Head of the Mediterranean Emergency Maintenance Service from 2000 to 2011 and a Director of Operation in 2012 and an Assistant Director of the Electricity Company in Daraa in 2014 and General Manager of the Electricity Company in Daraa Governorate from 2017 to 2020.

== Personal life ==
Ghassan al-Zamel is married with three sons.
