= Muhammad al-Ghafri =

Syrian judge

- محمد الغفري

Minister of Justice
- In office 4 October 2004 – 23 April 2009
- President: Bashar al-Assad
- Prime Minister: Muhammad Naji al-Otari
- Preceded by: Nizar Al Assi
- Succeeded by: Ahmad Younes

Personal details
- Party: Ba'ath Party

Muhammad al-Ghafri (Arabic: محمد الغفري) is a Syrian judge who served as justice minister from 2004 to 2009.

== Career ==
Ghafri was a counsellor at Syrian state council. He served as justice minister from October 2004 to April 2009 in the cabinet headed by then prime minister Mohammad Naji Al Otari, replacing Nizar Al Issa in the post. Ghafri was in office until April 2009 and succeeded by Ahmad Younes as justice minister. Then he was appointed head of the corruption combating committee
