= Mohammad al Jililati =

Syrian politician (born 1945)

Minister of Finance
- In office 14 April 2011 – 9 February 2013
- Prime Minister: Adel Safar; Riyad Farid Hijab; Wael Nader al-Halqi
- Preceded by: Mohammad Al Hussein
- Succeeded by: Ismael Ismael

Executive Director of the Damascus Securities Exchange
- In office February 2009 – 14 April 2011

Personal details
- Born: 1945 (age 80–81) Damascus
- Party: Syrian Regional Branch of the Arab Socialist Ba'ath Party
- Education: University of Damascus

Mohammad al Jililati (born 1945) is a Syrian economist and financial expert, who served as the minister of finance from April 2011 to 9 February 2013.

== Early life and education ==
Jillati was born in Damascus in 1945. He earned a bachelor's degree in economics from the Damascus University in 1967, and a PhD in economics and finance from the former Soviet Union in 1975.

== Career ==
Jillati was a professor at the faculty of economics of Damascus University beginning in 1975 and chairman of the accounting department where for ten years, he participated in several committees of government economic reform plans in the public sector, in addition to the supervision of many doctoral dissertations.

He served as chairman of the society of chartered accountants in Syria for four years and vice chairman of the board of commissioners of the securities commission and the Syrian financial markets from 2005 to 2009. He was acting executive director of the Damascus Securities Exchange from the establishment of the market in February 2009 to 2011.

In April 2011, he was appointed minister of finance in the cabinet of Adel Safar. His term ended on 9 February 2013.

== Personal life ==
Al-Jillati is married and has 5 children.

Political offices
Preceded by Mohammed Al Hussein	Finance Minister of Syria; 2011–2013	Succeeded by Ismael Ismael
