= Yousef Suleiman al-Ahmad =

Syrian economist and politician

Minister of State
- In office 14 April 2011 – 2012
- President: Bashar al-Assad
- Prime Minister: Adel Safar

Personal details
- Born: 1956 (age 69–70) Hasaka
- Party: Syrian Communist Party
- Education: University of Damascus

Yousef Suleiman al Ahmad (born 1956) is a Syrian economist and politician. He is the former minister of state.

== Early life and education ==
Ahmad was born in Hasaka in 1956. He earned a degree in economics from the University of Damascus in 1990, and a degree from the Institute of Social Sciences in Moscow.

== Career ==
Ahmad was a member of the People's Assembly in 1994, and deputy head of the financial laws committee. He has been a member of the Politburo of the Syrian Communist Party since 1995. He served as minister of state in charge of administrative development affairs.

=== Sanctions ===
The UK government included Ahmad in the list of Syrian individuals on 26 March 2013 whose assets were frozen.
