= Hussein Mahmoud Ferzat =

- حسين محمود فرزات

Former Minister of State
- In office 14 April 2011 – August 2014
- Prime Minister: Adel Safar; Riyad Farid Hijab; Wael Nader al-Halqi

Personal details
- Born: 1957 (age 68–69) Hama
- Party: Arab Socialist Movement
- Children: five
- Education: University of Aleppo
- Profession: architect

Hussein Mahmoud Ferzat (Arabic: حسين محمود فرزات; born 1957) Former Minister of State in Syria, in office until at least 2014. As former Government Minister, shares responsibility for the regime's violent repression against the civilian population.

Ferzat was born in 1957 in Hama. He earned a degree in architecture at the University of Aleppo in 1980. He was a member of the Hama City Council for three sessions. He has been a member of Parliament, a member of the Engineers Syndicate in Damascus, branch secretary of the Arab Socialist Movement Hama, a member of the Political Bureau, and Chief of the Office of the movement organization

Ferzat is married and has two sons and three daughters.

He is the owner and director of the "Farzat Real Estate Development and Investment Company" in the Syrian Arab Republic, and owns 100% of the shares in the company, with a value of 50,000,000 Syrian pounds.

== See also ==
- Cabinet of Syria
