= Mustafa Abdul Razzaq =

Syrian politician (born 1989)

- مصطفى عبد الرزاق

Minister of Public Works and Housing
- Incumbent
- Assumed office December 2024
- President: Ahmed al-Sharaa
- Preceded by: Hamza Ali

Personal details
- Born: 1989

Mustafa Abdul Razzaq (Arabic: مصطفى عبد الرزاق; born 1989) is a Syrian engineer and politician currently serving as the minister of public works and housing in the transitional government under President Ahmed al-Sharaa.

== Education and early career ==
Abdul Razzaq graduated with a bachelor's degree in civil engineering from the University of Aleppo in 2011. He later obtained a specialized diploma in public administration, project management, and institutional development.

== Professional career ==
From 2017 to 2019, Abdul Razzaq worked in the engineering projects department at the Bab al-Hawa Border Crossing, where he oversaw the implementation of many service and infrastructure projects in northwestern Syria under challenging conditions amidst the Syrian civil war. Between 2024 and 2025, he served as the Director General of the General Directorate of Works and Roads within the Syrian Salvation Government.

== Minister of Public Works and Housing ==
Abdul Razzaq was in the Syrian caretaker government.

In his speech upon his appointment in the same ministerial position in the Syrian transitional government, Abdul Razzaq emphasized that the ministry would adopt sustainable urban planning frameworks in its reconstruction efforts. He outlined a vision focused on achieving urban and economic development, enhancing transparency throughout all implementation stages, and developing the national urban map.

He also stressed the importance of fostering a favorable environment for partnerships with both local and international investors, and pledged to formulate the necessary legal frameworks to support this direction. His approach aims to guide Syria’s reconstruction according to modern, sustainable standards.
