= Walid Muallem =

Syrian politician and diplomat (1941–2020)

- وليد المعلم
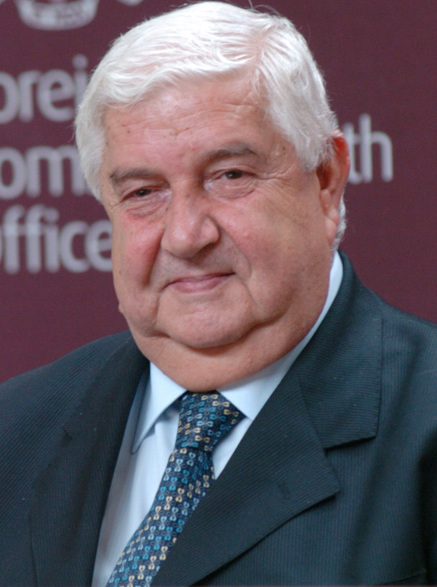
- Muallem in 2009

Deputy Prime Minister of Syria
- In office 23 June 2012 – 16 November 2020
- Prime Minister: Riyad Farid Hijab; Wael Nader al-Halqi; Imad Khamis; Hussein Arnous
- Preceded by: Abdullah al-Dardari
- Succeeded by: Ali Abdullah Ayyoub

Minister of Foreign Affairs and Expatriates
- In office 14 April 2011 – 16 November 2020
- Prime Minister: Adel Safar; Riyad Farid Hijab; Wael Nader al-Halqi; Imad Khamis; Hussein Arnous
- Preceded by: Himself (as Minister of Foreign Affairs); Joseph Sweid (as Minister of Expatriates)
- Succeeded by: Faisal Mekdad

Minister of Foreign Affairs
- In office 21 February 2006 – 29 March 2011
- Prime Minister: Muhammad Naji al-Otari
- Preceded by: Farouk al-Sharaa
- Succeeded by: Himself (as Minister of Foreign Affairs and Expatriates)

Ambassador of Syria to the United States
- In office 1 January 1990 – 31 December 2000
- President: Hafez al-Assad; Abdul Halim Khaddam (Acting); Bashar al-Assad
- Preceded by: Rafic Jouejati
- Succeeded by: Rustum Al-Zubi

Personal details
- Born: Walid Mohi Edine al Muallem; 13 January 1941 Damascus, Syria
- Died: 16 November 2020 (aged 79) Damascus, Syria
- Party: Ba'ath Party
- Other political affiliations: National Progressive Front
- Spouse: Sawsan Khayat
- Children: 3
- Nickname: Abu Tarek

Walid Mohi Edine al Muallem (Arabic: وليد محيي الدين المعلم, romanized: Walīd Muḥīyy ad-Dīn al-Muʿallem; 13 January 1941 – 16 November 2020) was a Syrian diplomat and Ba'ath Party member who served as foreign minister from 2006 until his death in 2020. He was also a deputy prime minister.

== Early life and education ==
Walid Muallem was born into a Sunni family on 13 January 1941 in Damascus. He received primary and secondary education in public schools from 1948 to 1960, then obtaining a Bachelor of Arts degree in economics from Cairo University in 1963.

== Career ==
Muallem was a member of the Syrian Regional Branch of the Arab Socialist Ba'ath Party. Muallem began his career at foreign ministry in 1964 and served in Syrian missions to Tanzania, Saudi Arabia, Spain and the United Kingdom. During his tenure in Saudi Arabia Muallem was a political attache. In May 1967 he and another Syrian political attache in Saudi Arabia, Jaber Bajbuj, were declared persona non grata by the Saudi authorities due to their alleged contacts with Ba'ath agents in Saudi Arabia, and both were ordered to leave the country within 24 hours.

He served as Syria's Ambassador to Romania from 1975 to 1980. Next he became the head of authentication and translation department at the foreign ministry in 1980 and his term ended in 1984. Later he served as the head of private offices department from 1984 to 1990. Muallem served as Syria's ambassador to the United States from 1990 to 2000, and was present at the signing of the Oslo Accords in 1993. He was then named as assistant foreign minister in 2000. He was appointed deputy foreign minister in 2005 and given the Lebanese file by president Bashar al-Assad.

He was appointed as minister of foreign affairs on 11 February 2006 during a cabinet reshuffle in which his predecessor Farouk al-Sharaa became vice-president. Muallem stated in August 2006, "I am ready to be one of Hassan Nasrallahʹs soldiers." He also stated that Syria has a special relationship with Iran. He was involved in Israeli-Syrian negotiations, both before and during his tenure as foreign minister.

=== Syrian civil war ===
Early on in the Syrian civil war, Muallem held frequent press conferences with Syrian media and Arab outlets. In August 2012, Muallem gave his first interview with a Western journalist since the start of the civil war, in English, saying that "I tell the Europeans: '... I don't understand your slogan of fighting international terrorism when you are supporting this terrorism in Syria'" and stating the government's position that the United States was "the major player against Syria" as it sought to contain Iran. He denied the existence of the Shabiha, pro-government, paid militiamen alleged to have committed atrocities early on during the civil war while blaming 60% of Syria's violence on Turkey, Qatar and Saudi Arabia "with the United States exercising its influence over all others." That year, he was sanctioned by the European Union, which said that as a government minister, he "shares responsibility for the Syrian regime's violent repression of the civilian population".

In October 2012, after United Nations Secretary-General Ban Ki-moon urged Syria to show compassion in light of the growing humanitarian crisis, Muallem spoke at the United Nations and blamed the United States, France, Turkey, Saudi Arabia, and Qatar for "aid[ing] terror" and "blatant interference" in Syria's affairs, mainly by supplying rebel groups with arms and money calling for Bashar al-Assad to step down. He called Western concerns over chemical weapons use "a joke" and a pretext for an Iraq War-like campaign. Later that month, Muallem also rejected calls by Ban to declare a unilateral ceasefire, insisting that governments that "finance, train and deliver weapons to the armed groups, notably Saudi Arabia, Qatar and Turkey" be stopped. In December 2012, he further blamed United States and European Union sanctions for the suffering in Syria.

In January 2013, after United Nations and Arab League envoy Lakhdar Brahimi said Bashar al-Assad should not take part in a transitional government, Muallem called on opposition groups to join a new cabinet under al-Assad, so long as they "reject foreign intervention."

During his speech during the Sixty-eighth session of the United Nations General Assembly in September 2013, Muallem claimed that "terrorists from more than 83 countries" are killing Syrian soldiers and civilians and compared the recent events of the Syrian civil war to the September 11, 2001 attacks in the United States. In a separate interview with BBC correspondent Jeremy Bowen, Muallem said that the international peace talks were vital for Syria's future while these talks in Geneva "cannot succeed" while Turks, Saudis and Qataris supported the rebels.

In January 2014, Muallem participated in the Geneva II Conference on Syria at Montreux. He described the opposition as traitors and terrorists in his initial speech while accusing a number of states of supporting terrorism and deliberately attempting to destabilize Syria. Despite the conference rules permitting only ten minutes to each speaker, Muallem talked for over forty minutes before finishing and repeatedly ignored Ban Ki-moon attempts to conclude his speech.

In February 2016, after Saudi Arabia was planning to send its troops to Syria in order to fight against the Islamic State, Muallem warned that any foreign army soldiers who enter Syria without government consent would "return home in wooden coffins".

Following the September 2016 Deir ez-Zor air raid which killed up to 100 Syrian soldiers, Muallem said that the Syrian government "holds the United States fully responsible because facts show that it was an intentional attack, and not an error, even if the United States claims otherwise."

== Personal life and death ==
Muallem was married to Sawsan Khayat and had three children, Tarek, Shatha and Khaled.

He died on the morning of 16 November 2020, at the age of 79, at Shami Hospital in Damascus. The cause of his death was not disclosed, but Muallem had been suffering from heart problems for years. He was buried at Mezzeh Cemetery.

== See also ==
- Foreign relations of Syria
- List of foreign ministers in 2017

Political offices
Preceded by Farouk al-Sharaa	Minister of Foreign Affairs and Expatriates of Syria; 2006–2020	Succeeded by Faisal Mekdad
