= Abdullah Dardari =

Syrian economist (born 1963)

Abdullah al-Dardari
- عبد الله الدردري
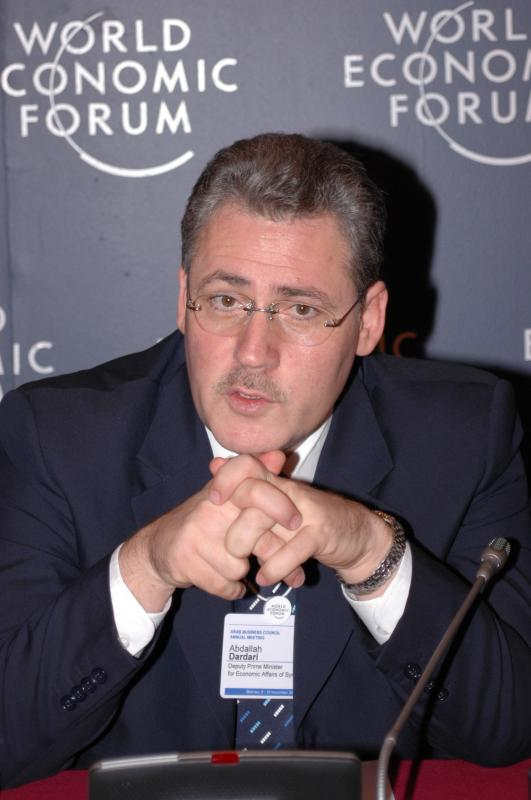

Deputy Prime Minister of Syria for Economic Affairs
- In office 14 June 2005 – 29 March 2011
- President: Bashar al-Assad
- Prime Minister: Mohammed Naji al-Otari
- Succeeded by: Office abolished

Personal details
- Born: 1963 (age 62–63) Damascus, Syria
- Party: Ba'ath Party
- Education: University of Southern California; Richmond International University; University of Grenoble
- Occupation: Economist, Journalist

Abdullah Abdel Razzaq al-Dardari (Arabic: عبدالله عبدالرزاق الدردري; born 1963) is a United Nations Assistant Secretary-General and the United Nations Development Program Assistant Administrator and Director, Regional Bureau for Arab States. Prior to his appointment in 2023, he was the United Nations Development Program's Resident Representative in Kabul, Afghanistan. Previously, he worked for the World Bank. He has also served in several positions in the government of the Syrian Arab Republic.

In September 2014, he was appointed as Deputy Executive Secretary of Economic and Social Commission for Western Asia. On this occasion, he has been criticized for never publicly criticizing Bashar al-Assad’s current Syrian government. He has also been accused of maintaining ambiguous relationships with both the various rebel groups and the Syrian Government.

== Early life and education ==
Mr. Al Dardari was born in 1963 in Damascus, Syria. He is the son of Major General Abdul Razzaq Dardari, commander of the Operations Division in the war of 1973. He holds a Masters in International Political Economy from The University of Southern California, a Bachelors in Economics from the Richmond University and conducted Post Graduate Research at the London School of Economics. He was awarded an Honorary Doctorate from Yalova University in Istanbul.

== Career ==
Mr. Al Dardari began his career as a journalist in Alhayat, pan-Arab daily. Then he became UNDP's Assistant Resident Representative in Syria from 2001 to 2003. He was brought to the government first as Head of the State Planning Commission where he served in from 2003 to 2005. It was there that he started authoring Syria's 10th five-year plan, seen as the blueprint of reforms in Syria from 2006 to 2011. In 2005, Dardari was appointed Deputy Prime Minister of Economic Affairs. Mr. Al Dardari also served as minister of planning from 2006 to 2008. His term ended in March 2011. The office, deputy premiership for economic affairs, was also abolished. He was removed from office due to his conflict with Rami Makhlouf, Bashar al-Assad's cousin. Mr. Al Dardari joined the United Nations's Economic and Social Commission for Western Asia (ESCWA) in September 2011 he began to serve as the Director of the Economic Development and Globalization Division (EDGD) and Chief Economist.

== Personal life ==
Mr. Al Dardari is married and has three children. He speaks fluent Arabic, English, and French, with an understanding of Russian and Turkish.
