= Ministry of Water Resources (Syria) =

Government ministry of Syria

- وزارة الموارد المائية

Agency overview
- Formed: 2012
- Preceding agency: Ministry of Irrigation
- Dissolved: 2025
- Superseding agency: Ministry of Energy
- Jurisdiction: Government of Syria
- Headquarters: Harasta, Rif Dimashq, Syria (last known)

The Ministry of Water Resources (Arabic: وزارة الموارد المائية, romanized: Wizārat al-Mawārid al-Māʼīyah) was a department of the Syrian government. On 29 March 2025, it was merged with the Ministry of Electricity and the Ministry of Oil and Mineral Resources to become the Ministry of Energy.

== History ==
The Ministry of Irrigation was created by Law No. 16 of 1982 as a process of compiling the tasks that were distributed to a number of public agencies (the Ministry of Public Works and Water Resources - the Ministry of the Euphrates Dam) and then attached to them.

The quality institutions in the Euphrates basin that were created after the completion of the dam, which is the Public Institution for Land Reclamation and The General Authority for Investment and Development of the Euphrates Basin, as attached to it by the General Corporation for the Euphrates Dam, the General Company for Water Projects and the General Company for Water Studies were attached to the ministry.

In 2005, with the aim of developing the planning process for the water sector in Syria, it created the “General Authority for Water Resources to replace the general irrigation directorates.” In 2012, the Ministry of Water Resources was created to replace the Ministry of Irrigation, and drinking water institutions and sewage companies in the governorates were linked to it.

== Directorates and bodies ==
- Directorate of Systems and Technology
- Directorate of Human Resources
- Directorate of Irrigation and Drainage
- Directorate of Planning and International Cooperation
- Directorate of Legal Affairs
- Drinking Water Directorate
- Administrative Development Directorate
- Directorate of Equipment and Energy Rationalization
- Sanitation Directorate
- Directorate of International Waters and Dams

== List of ministers ==
Minister	Government	Term
Minister for Water Resources
Bassam Hanna (first)	Riyad Hijab government First Wael al-Halqi government	2012 to 2014
Kamal Sheikha	Second Wael al-Halqi government	2014 to 2016
Nabil Al-Hassan	Imad Khamis government	2016 to 2018
Hussein Arnous	Imad Khamis government	2018 to 2020
Tammam Raad	First Hussein Arnous government Second Hussein Arnous government	2020 to 2023
Hussein Makhlouf	Second Hussein Arnous government	2023 to 2024
Moataz Qattan	Mohammad Ghazi al-Jalali government	2024
Osama Abu Zaid (last)	Syrian caretaker government	2024 to 2025

== See also ==
- Water supply and sanitation in Syria
- Water resources management in Syria
- Water management in Greater Damascus
