= Khalil al-Rifaei =

Syrian politician

Khalil al-Rifaei is a former member of the People's Assembly of Syria from Daraa. Along with fellow parliamentarian Naser al-Hariri, also from Daraa, he resigned from his seat in protest at the "continued killings of protesters during the 2011 protests in Syria".
