= Hilal al-Atrash =

Syrian engineer and politician

Hilal Al Atrash

Minister of Local Administration
- In office December 2000 – April 2009
- President: Bashar al-Assad
- Prime Minister: Mohammed Mustafa Mero
- Succeeded by: Tamer Al Hijeh

Personal details
- Party: Syrian Regional Branch of the Arab Socialist Ba'ath Party

Hilal Al Atrash is a Syrian engineer and politician who served as minister of local administration and environment from 2001 to 2009.

== Career ==
Atrash is an engineer by training. In November 2000, he was appointed governor of the Quneitra province, which was his first governorship. He was a member of the Baath party, being part of the reformist wing. He was appointed minister of local administration on 13 December 2000 to the cabinet headed by then prime minister Mohammed Mustafa Mero, which was reshuffled after Hafez al-Assad's death. Atrash's term ended in a cabinet reshuffle in April 2009 and he was succeeded by Tamer Al Hijeh. Then he was named Syrian ambassador to Libya.
