= Joseph Sweid =

Syrian politician

- جوزيف سويد

Minister of State
- In office 14 April 2011 – 10 August 2014
- Prime Minister: Adel Safar; Riyad Farid Hijab; Wael Nader al-Halqi

2nd Minister of Expatriates
- In office 30 July 2008 – 29 March 2011
- President: Bashar al-Assad
- Prime Minister: Mohammad Najji Outri
- Preceded by: Bouthaina Shaaban
- Succeeded by: Walid Muallem

Personal details
- Born: 1958 (age 67–68) Damascus, United Arab Republic
- Party: Syrian Social Nationalist Party
- Children: 2
- Education: University of Damascus
- Profession: Lawyer

Joseph Sweid (Arabic: جوزيف سويد; born in 1958) is a retired Syrian politician. Between 2011 and 2014, he was Syrian Minister of State and a member of the Syrian Social Nationalist Party. He has served as the Minister of Expatriates.

Sweid was born in Damascus in 1958. He earned his LLB degree at the University of Damascus in 1983, afterwards practicing law.

Sweid became a member of the People's Assembly in 2003, serving on the Committees of Foreign Affairs. He was also Constitutional Secretary of the Political Bureau of the Syrian Social Nationalist Party. He is married and has two children.

== See also ==
- Cabinet of Syria
