= Omar Ibrahim Ghalawanji =

Acting Prime minister of Syria (2012)

- عمر ابراهيم غلاونجي

Prime Minister of Syria Acting
- In office 6 August 2012 – 9 August 2012
- President: Bashar al-Assad
- Preceded by: Riyad Farid Hijab
- Succeeded by: Wael Nader al-Halqi

Deputy Prime Minister for Service Affairs
- In office 23 June 2012 – 22 June 2016
- Prime Minister: Adel Safar; Riyad Farid Hijab; Wael Nader al-Halqi

Minister of Local Administration
- In office 14 April 2011 – 22 June 2016
- Prime Minister: Adel Safar; Riyad Farid Hijab; Wael Nader al-Halqi
- Preceded by: Hammoud al-Hussein
- Succeeded by: Hussein Makhlouf

Personal details
- Born: 1954 (age 71–72) Tartus, Syria
- Party: Independent
- Education: Tishreen University

Omar Ibrahim Ghalawanji (Arabic: عمر ابراهيم غلاونجي, romanized: 'Umar Ibrāhīm Ğalāwanjī; born 1954) is a Syrian politician who was the caretaker prime minister of Syria in August 2012, following the defection of Riyad Farid Hijab.

== Early life and education ==
Ghalawanji was born in 1954 to a Sunni family residing in the Tartus Governorate. He earned a degree in civil engineering from the Tishreen University in 1978.

== Career ==
Ghalawanji was the director of a number of the Military Housing Establishment's directorates from 1978 to 2000. He was also the deputy chairman of Lattakia City Council from 1997 to 2000. He served as the director of the General Housing Establishment, a member of the Advisory Committee of the Arab Housing Ministers Council and of the Board of Directors of the Arab Union Contracting Company.

== Prime minister ==
On 6 August 2012, Ghalawanji was announced as the head of a Syrian caretaker government, succeeding prime minister Riyad Farid Hijab.

== See also ==
- Cabinet of Syria

Political offices
Preceded by Riyad Farid Hijab	Prime Minister of Syria; Acting; 2012	Succeeded by Wael Nader al-Halqi
