= Nazira Farah Sarkis =

Syrian politician

Minister of Environment Affairs
- President: Bashar al-Assad

Personal details
- Born: 1962 (age 63–64) Aleppo, Syria
- Education: University of Aleppo (PhD)

Nazira Farah Sarkis is a Syrian politician and the State Minister for Environment Affairs of Syria. She is an ethnic Armenian.

== Early life ==
Nazira Farah Sarkis was born in 1962 in Aleppo, Syria. She completed her Bachelor of Arts in chemical sciences and Master's degree in analytical chemistry. She also has a diploma in analytical chemistry. He finished her PhD from University of Aleppo in chemical sciences.

== Career ==
Nazira Farah Sarkis worked in the Pharmacy College at University of Aleppo where she was the head of the teachers' union. She was the head of the Analytical Chemistry Department at University of Aleppo. She was appointed the Minister of Environment Affairs on 23 June 2012 by President Bashar al-Assad. She has been added to the Specially Designated Nationals by the Office of Foreign Assets Control of the United States along with other Syrian government officials. On 11 May 2015 she organized an event in celebration of World Migratory Birds Day in collaboration with the Syrian Society for the Conservation of Wildlife in the National Museum Hall in Damascus, Syria.
