= 2007 Syrian parliamentary election =

- 22 April 2007

All 250 seats in the Parliament of Syria 126 seats needed for a majority
- Registered: 7,805,994
- Turnout: 56.12% (▼7.33pp)
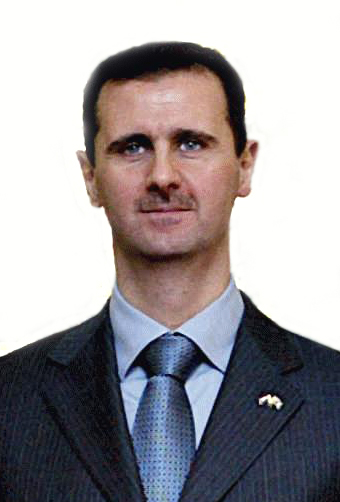
	First party	Second party
		IND
Leader	Bashar al-Assad	Independent politicians
Party	Ba'ath Party	Independents
Alliance	NPF
Last election	167	83
Seats won	169	81
Seat change	▲2	▼2
Speaker before election
Mahmoud al-Abrash
Ba'ath Party
Elected Speaker
Mahmoud al-Abrash
Ba'ath Party

Parliamentary elections were held in Syria on 22 April 2007. The number of seats reserved for the parties in the National Progressive Front was increased to 170 from 167, decreasing the seats for independents to 80 from 83. The election was boycotted by the opposition in exile, who described it as a "farce".

== Pre-election events ==
The number of entrants to the parliamentary election race at the deadline reached 9,770, of whom 2,293 were approved, including 158 women. The entrants competed for 250 seats which are divided among the 14 governorates of Syria as follows:

Governorate	Seats	Percentage
Damascus	29	11.6%
Rif Dimashq	19	7.6%
Quneitra	5	2%
Daraa	10	4%
As Suwaydā'	6	2.4%
Homs	23	9.2%
Tartous	13	5.2%
Latakia	17	6.8%
Hama	22	8.8%
Idlib	18	7.2%
Aleppo	52	20.8%
Raqqa	8	3.2%
Deir ez-Zor	14	5.6%
Al Hasakah	14	5.6%

== Results ==
According to results released on 26 April 2007, the National Progressive Front won 169 seats, while independents won the other 81 seats. Turnout was 56.12% of the 11.96 million eligible voters, and 30 female candidates were elected, exactly as many as in 2003. Opponents of the government and human rights activists claimed fraud and a turnout of at most 10 percent.

Party	Votes	%	Seats	+/–
Ba'ath Party			134	–1
Arab Socialist Union Party			8	+1
Socialist Unionist Party			6	–1
Syrian Communist Party (Bakdash)			5	+1
Democratic Socialist Unionist Party			4	0
Arab Socialist Movement			3	–1
Syrian Communist Party (Faisal)			3	–1
National Covenant Party			3	+1
Syrian Social Nationalist Party			2	+2
Arab Democratic Union Party			1	New
Social Democratic Unionists			0	New
Independents			81	–2
Total			250	–
Total votes	4,380,723	–		
Registered voters/turnout	7,805,994	56.12		
Source: Syrian Parliament, IPU
