= Imad Khamis =

Prime minister of Syria (2016–2020)

- عماد خميس
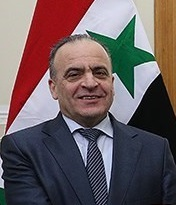
- Khamis in 2017

Prime Minister of Syria
- In office 3 July 2016 – 11 June 2020
- President: Bashar al-Assad
- Deputy: Walid Muallem
- Preceded by: Wael Nader al-Halqi
- Succeeded by: Hussein Arnous

Minister of Electricity
- In office 14 April 2011 – 3 July 2016
- Prime Minister: Adel Safar; Riyad Farid Hijab; Wael Nader al-Halqi
- Preceded by: Ahmad Qusay Kayyali
- Succeeded by: Mohammad Zuhair Kharboutli

Personal details
- Born: Imad Muhammad Dib Khamis; 1 August 1961 (age 65) Saqba, United Arab Republic
- Party: Ba'ath Party
- Other political affiliations: National Progressive Front
- Children: 3
- Education: Damascus University
- Cabinet: Khamis

Imad Muhammad Dib Khamis (Arabic: عماد محمد ديب خميس, romanized: ʿImād Muḥammad Dīb Khamīs; born 1 August 1961) is a Syrian politician who served as the prime minister of Syria from 2016 to 2020 under president Bashar al-Assad. Previously, he was minister of electricity from 2011 to 2016.

== Early life and education ==
Khamis was born in Saqba near Damascus on 1 August 1961. He earned a degree in electrical engineering from the University of Damascus in 1981.

== Premiership ==
Khamis was assigned to the management of a number of departments in the General Organization for the distribution and investment power from 1987 to 2005. He was Director General of the General Company for Electricity for the Damascus Governorate from 2005 to 2008. He was appointed Director-General of the Public Corporation for the distribution and investment power in 2008.

On 3 July 2016, Khamis was appointed Prime Minister of Syria, following the 2016 parliamentary election.

=== Sanctions ===
The European Union sanctioned Khamis due to his alleged role in using electric cuts as a way of repressing Syrian people on 24 March 2012.

=== Dismissal ===
He was dismissed on 11 June 2020 by President Bashar al-Assad amid a worsening economic crisis and subsequent regional protests. According to Al Akhbar, Khamis was detained after he was dismissed from premiership, and has been interrogated due to corruption charges. However, Khamis was seen shortly after, when he was voting during the 2020 Syrian parliamentary election.

== Personal life ==
Khamis is married and has three children.

== See also ==
- Cabinet of Syria

Political offices
Preceded by Wael Nader al-Halqi	Prime Minister of Syria; 2016–2020	Succeeded by Hussein Arnous
