= Wael Nader al-Halqi =

Prime Minister of Syria (2012–2016)

Wael Nader al-Halqi MD
- وائل نادر الحلقي
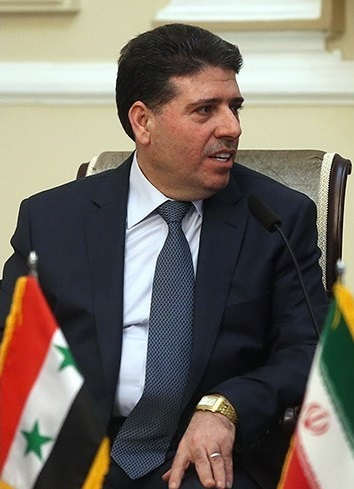
- Halqi in 2014

Prime Minister of Syria
- In office 9 August 2012 – 3 July 2016
- President: Bashar al-Assad
- Deputy: Fahd Jassem al-Freij; Walid Muallem
- Preceded by: Omar Ibrahim Ghalawanji (Acting)
- Succeeded by: Imad Khamis

Minister of Health
- In office 14 April 2011 – 26 August 2012
- Prime Minister: Adel Safar; Riyad Farid Hijab; Omar Ibrahim Ghalawanji (Acting)
- Preceded by: Rida Adnan Said
- Succeeded by: Saad Abdel-Salam al-Nayef

Member of the Regional Command of the Syrian Regional Branch of the Baath Party
- In office 8 July 2013 – 3 July 2016

Personal details
- Born: 4 February 1964 (age 62) Jasim, Daraa Governorate, Syria
- Party: Ba'ath Party
- Other political affiliations: National Progressive Front
- Education: Damascus University
- Profession: Politician, Medical Doctor
- Cabinet: al-Halqi I al-Halqi II

Wael Nader al-Halqi (Arabic: وائل نادر الحلقي, romanized: Wāʾil Nādir al-Ḥalqī; born 4 February 1964) is a Syrian politician who was Prime Minister of Syria from 2012 to 2016. Previously he was Minister of Health from 2011 to 2012.

== Early life and education ==
Halqi was born in Jasim in the Daraa Governorate on 4 February 1964 into a Sunni Muslim family. He earned a degree in medicine (MD) from the University of Damascus in 1987 and a master's degree in gynaecology and obstetrics again from the University of Damascus in 1991.

== Career ==
Halqi served as director of primary health care in Jasim from 1997 to 2000 and was secretary of the Daraa branch of the Arab Socialist Ba'ath Party from 2000 to 2004. He served as the director of health in Daraa, and in 2010, was appointed head of Syria's doctors. He was appointed as Prime Minister of Syria on 9 August 2012 by President Bashar al-Assad, after his predecessor Riyad Farid Hijab fled to Jordan and declared his allegiance to the Syrian opposition. Halqi took many efforts in fighting terrorism during his premiership. He is titled as The Chief of Fighting Terrorism Government in Syria.

== Attempted assassination ==
In April 2013, Halqi survived an apparent assassination attempt by car bombing in the Mezzeh district of Damascus. The assassination attempt killed six people.

== Personal life ==
Halqi is married and has four children, one daughter and three sons.

== See also ==
- Cabinet of Syria

Political offices
Preceded by Omar Ibrahim Ghalawanji; Acting	Prime Minister of Syria; 2012–2016	Succeeded by Imad Khamis
