= Syrian Communist Party (Unified) =

Banned political party in Syria

Syrian Communist Party (Unified) الحزب الشيوعي السوري (الموحد)
- Abbreviation: SCP(U)
- First Secretary: Najmuddin al-Kharit
- Founder: Yusuf Faisal
- Founded: January 30, 1987; 39 years ago
- Banned: January 29, 2025; 20 months ago
- Split from: Syrian Communist Party
- Headquarters: Damascus, Syria
- Newspaper: An-Nour
- Youth wing: Syrian Democratic Youth Union
- Ideology: Communism; Marxism–Leninism
- Political position: Far-left
- National affiliation: National Progressive Front (until 2025)
- International affiliation: IMCWP; World Anti-Imperialist Platform
- Colours: Red
- People's Assembly: 0 / 250

Website
- scparty-unified.com

The Syrian Communist Party (Unified) (Arabic: الحزب الشيوعي السوري (الموحد)), also known as the Unified Syrian Communist Party, is a banned Marxist-Leninist party in Syria.

The party emerged from a split from the original Syrian Communist Party, emerging from the pro-Perestroika faction of the latter. It supported the Assad regime and as a result was banned after its fall.

== History ==
The party emerged from a split in the Syrian Communist Party in 1986, formed by the pro-Perestroika faction led by Yusuf Faisal. It initially retained the Syrian Communist Party name and claimed to be the party's true continuation.

At the time of the 2000 Damascus Spring, the party was able to publish a newspaper called an-Nour ("The Light").

The 11th party congress, held in March 2011, re-elected Hanin Nimir as First Secretary of the party.

Following the fall of the Assad regime, the party published a statement expressing support for the Syrian transitional government and calling for a new constitution to be published.

The party was banned by the Syrian transitional government on 29 January 2025, due to its support for the former regime. The ban was condemned by the Iraqi Communist Party and the Communist Party of Kurdistan – Iraq.

== Leaders ==
- Yusuf Faisal (1986–2011)
- Hanin Nimir (2011–2022)
- Najmuddin al-Kharit (2022–2025)

== Election results ==
=== Syrian People's Assembly elections ===
Election	Seats	+/–
2007	3 / 250	New
2012	3 / 250	0
2016	1 / 250	▼2
2020	1 / 250	0
2024	2 / 250	▲1
