= Ministry of Public Works and Housing (Syria) =

Government ministry of Syria

- وزارة الأشغال العامة والإسكان

Agency overview
- Formed: 1920, 2016 (final form)
- Preceding agency: Ministry of Public Works Ministry of Housing and Urban Development
- Jurisdiction: Government of Syria
- Headquarters: Damascus
- Minister responsible: Mustafa Abdul Razzaq
- Website: mopwh.gov.sy

The Ministry of Public Works and Housing (Arabic: وزارة الأشغال العامة والإسكان, romanized: Wizārat al-Ashghāl al-ʿĀmmah wa-al-Iskān) is a department of the cabinet of Syria. It is based in Yusuf al-Azma Square, Damascus.

== Responsibilities ==
The Ministry for Public Works and Housing is responsible for the planning of urban development affairs by drawing the general policy for sustainable urban planning and development, and preparing development plans and programs from the regional level to the local level.

And in the affairs of housing and real estate development, by working to provide the basic ingredients for the development of the housing sector to produce real estate products that meet the needs of society through real estate development projects.

As for public works affairs, it is through the implementation of construction projects in the administrative public sector agencies through the work of the public construction companies affiliated with the Ministry.

== Ministers ==
| Minister | Government | Term |
Minister for Public Works and Housing
| Mansour Fadlallah Azzam | Riyad Hijab government First Wael al-Halqi government | 2012 to 2013 |
| Hussein Arnous | First Wael al-Halqi government Second Wael al-Halqi government Imad Khamis government | 2013 to 2018 |
| Suhail Mohammad Abdullatif | First Hussein Arnous government Second Hussein Arnous government | 2018 to 2024 |
| Hamza Ali | Mohammad Ghazi al-Jalali government | 2024 |
| Mustafa Abdul Razzaq | Syrian caretaker government Syrian transitional government | 2024 to present |

== See also ==
- Government ministries of Syria
