= Radwan al-Habib =

Syrian public servant (born 1962)

Minister of Social Affairs and Labor
- In office 14 April 2011 – 23 June 2012
- Prime Minister: Adel Safar; Riyad Farid Hijab
- Preceded by: Diyala AlHaj Aref
- Succeeded by: Jassim Zakaria

Member of the People's Council of Syria
- In office 2003–2007
- President: Bashar al-Assad

Personal details
- Born: 1962 (age 63–64) Aleppo Governorate, Syria
- Party: Baath Arab Socialist Party
- Children: four
- Education: University of Aleppo

Radwan al-Habib (born 1962) is a former Syrian politician who served as the Minister of Social Affairs and Labor for Syria between 2011 and 2012 and the Minister Of Justice in 2012.

== Early life, education and career ==
Al-Habib was born in the Aleppo Governorate in 1962. He earned a law degree from the University of Aleppo in 1986, a Diploma (Doctorate) in Advanced Studies in commercial law from the University of Poitiers in France, and a Ph.D. in corporate administration in 1997. He was a member of the People's Council of Syria for the Aleppo Governorate from 2003 to 2007 (8th assembly), and Vice President in the 9th assembly.

Al-Habib was a lecturer and later a faculty member of the Department (Faculty) of Law at the University of Aleppo. He was also a member of the Legal Office in the University of Aleppo branch of the Baath Arab Socialist Party.

== Personal life ==
Al-Habib is married and has four children.

== See also ==
- Cabinet of Syria
