= Ministry of Presidential Affairs =

Government ministry of Syria

The Ministry of Presidential Affairs (Arabic: وزارة شؤون رئاسة الجمهورية, romanized: Wizārat Shuʼūn Riʼāsat al-Jumhūrīyah) was a department of the Syrian Government. The ministry assisted the work of the President of Syria. The ministry was abolished on 13 December 2023.

== List of ministers ==
- Mansour Fadlallah Azzam (2011 – 13 December 2023)
