= Ministry of Local Administration and Environment (Syria) =

Government ministry of Syria

- وزارة الإدارة المحلية والبيئة

Agency overview
- Formed: 1972, renewed 2016
- Preceding agency: Ministry of Local Administration Ministry of Environment
- Jurisdiction: Government of Syria
- Headquarters: Damascus
- Minister responsible: Mohammed Anjrani
- Website: molae.gov.sy

The Ministry of Local Administration and Environment (Arabic: وزارة الإدارة المحلية والبيئة, romanized: Wizārat al-Idārah al-Maḥallīyah wa-al-Bīʾah) is a department of the cabinet of Syria.

== History ==
The history of the Ministry of Local Administration goes back to the first government during the era of Hafez al-Assad, and this journey began by Jabr al-Kafri in March 1972. The ministry continued as it was until the end of 2001 when the Ministry of State for Environmental Affairs was added to it and entrusted to the engineer Hilal al-Atrash.

Legislative Decree 64 of 2004 stipulated that the term Ministry of Local Administration and Environment should replace the Ministry of Housing and Construction. The third article of the decree stipulates that “the workers in the Ministry of Housing and Construction who are on the job in the Directorates of Urban Planning and Topography shall be deemed to be transferred by law to the Ministry of Local Administration and Environment”.

In April 2009, Decree No. 25 was issued to dismiss the ministry and create a Ministry of State for Environmental Affairs to assume the tasks and competencies that were assumed by the Ministry of Local Administration and Environment in accordance with the legislation and regulations in force with regard to environmental affairs. The name of the Ministry of Local Administration and Environment was amended to become the Ministry of Local Administration.

The Ministry in its current form was created in 2016 by a presidential decree (Law No. 18) merging both the Ministry of Local Administration and the Ministry of State for Environmental Affairs.

== Responsibility ==
Through the Local Administration Law, the concerned ministry is responsible for:

- Securing services for citizens
- Community cohesion
- Decentralization
- Local government
- Town and Country planning
- Natural environment
- Reconstruction
- Urban regeneration
- General policy of state

== Organisation ==
=== Ministry directorates ===
Minister's Office Directorate

Assistant Minister's Office

- Directorate of Institutions and Companies
- Directorate of Press and Information
- Directorate of Administrative Affairs
- Directorate of Planning and Statistics
- Directorate of Local Councils Affairs
- Directorate of Personnel Affairs
- Directorate of Financial Affairs
- Legal Department
- Department of Studies and Contracts
- Directorate of Internal Control
- Administrative Development Directorate
- Directorate of Fire and Disaster Affairs
- The tasks of the Informatics Directorate
- Technical Affairs Directorate
- Follow-up and Complaints Directorate
- Directorate of Service Systems and Schemes
- Directorate of Mechanisms
- Directorate of Real Estate Affairs
- Directorate of International Cooperation
- Technical Department

=== Environmental Directorates ===
- Directorate of Renewable Energy and Cleaner Production
- Directorate of Water Safety
- Environmental Awareness Directorate
- Atmospheric Safety Directorate
- Directorate of Biodiversity, Lands and Reserves
- Directorate of Environmental Impact Assessment
- Environmental Research Directorate
- Safety Directorate

=== Affiliates ===
- General Directorate of Real Estate Interests
- Inland transportation companies
- Citizen service centers
- Reconstruction Committee
- Relief Committee

== See also ==
- Government ministries of Syria
