= Muhammad Naji al-Otari =

Prime minister of Syria (2003–2011)

Muhammad Naji al-Otri
- محمد ناجي عطري
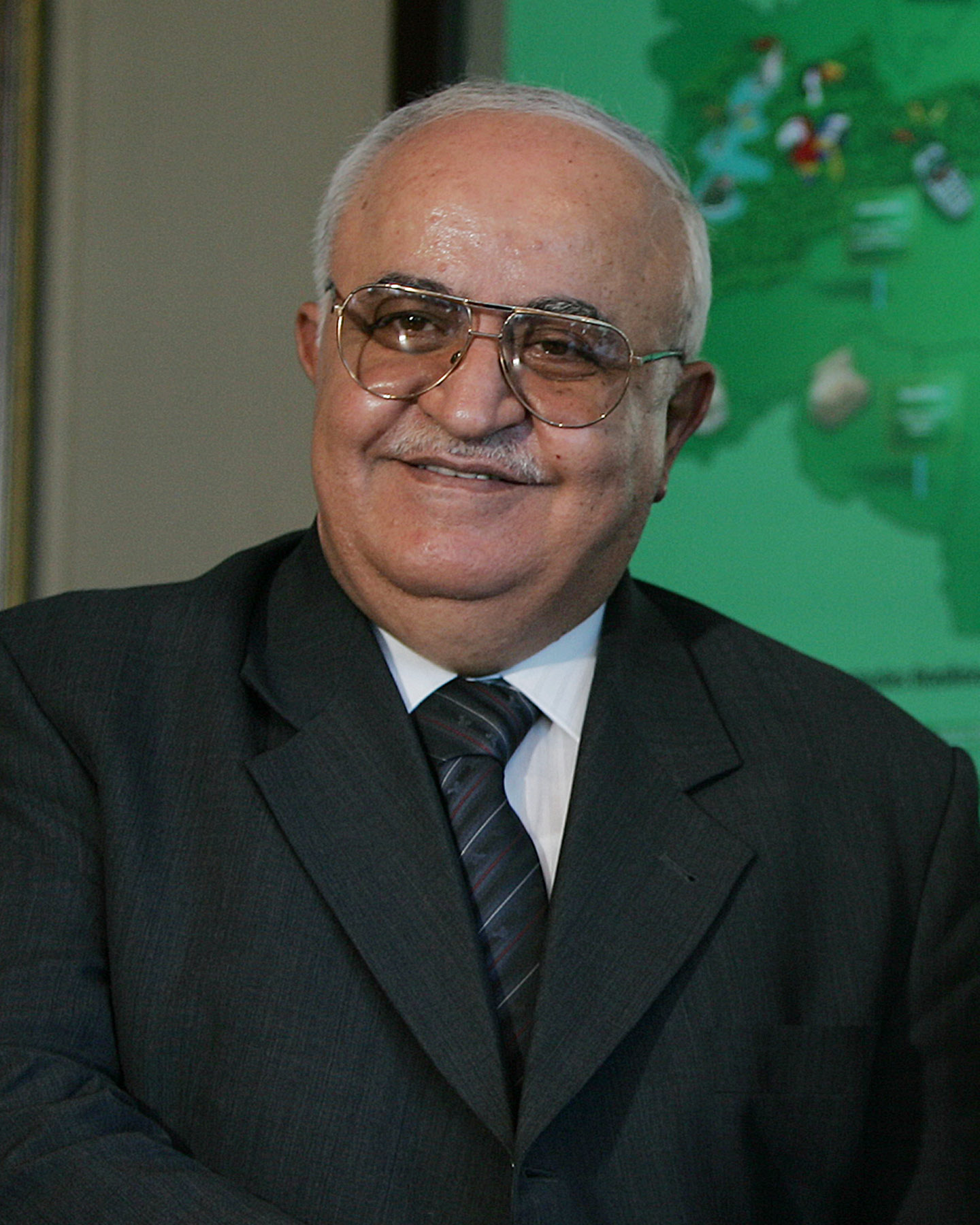

Prime Minister of Syria
- In office 10 September 2003 – 14 April 2011
- President: Bashar al-Assad
- Deputy: Abdullah Dardari
- Preceded by: Muhammad Mustafa Mero
- Succeeded by: Adel Safar

Speaker of the People's Assembly of Syria
- In office 9 March 2003 – 18 September 2003
- Preceded by: Abdel Kader Kaddoura
- Succeeded by: Mahmoud al-Abrash

Member of the Regional Command of the Syrian Regional Branch
- In office 21 June 2000 – 8 July 2013

Governor of Homs
- In office 1993–2000
- Preceded by: Yahya Abu Asli
- Succeeded by: Hossam al-Din al-Hakim

Personal details
- Born: 1 January 1944 (age 82) Aleppo, Syria
- Party: Ba'ath Party
- Other political affiliations: National Progressive Front
- Cabinet: Al-Otari

Muhammad Naji al-Otri (Arabic: محمد ناجي عطري, romanized: Muḥammad Nājī al-'Uṭrī, also Etri, Itri and Otri; born 1 January 1944) is a Syrian politician who was Prime Minister of Syria from 2003 to 2011.

== Early life and education ==
Born in Aleppo in 1944, Otri studied architecture and has a diploma in urban planning from the Netherlands. He is fluent in French, English, and Spanish.

== Career ==
Otri headed the city council in Aleppo from 1983 to 1987 and is a former governor of Homs. He was president of Aleppo's engineering syndicate from 1989 to 1993. He is a long-serving member of the ruling Arab Socialist Ba'ath Party. In March 2000, he became a member of the Ba'ath Party's Central Committee and in June 2000 of the party's influential Regional Command. In March 2000, he was also appointed deputy prime minister for services affairs and he served in this post until 2003. He was elected speaker of the Syrian parliament, or People's Assembly, in March 2003.

== Prime minister ==
He was first appointed Prime Minister on 10 September 2003. His nomination has been said to combine both "technocratic and Ba'athist trends" in Syrian politics. On 29 March 2011, the entire cabinet resigned following protests against the regime. On 3 April 2011, President Assad appointed Adel Safar to succeed Otri.

Political offices
Preceded by Abdel Kader Kaddoura	Speaker of Parliament of Syria; 2003	Succeeded by Mahmoud al-Abrash
Preceded by Muhammad Mustafa Mero	Prime Minister of Syria; 2003–2011	Succeeded by Adel Safar
