= Adel Safar =

Prime Minister of Syria (2011–2012)

- عادل سفر

Prime Minister of Syria
- In office 14 April 2011 – 23 June 2012
- President: Bashar al-Assad
- Preceded by: Muhammad Naji al-Otari
- Succeeded by: Riyad Farid Hijab

Minister of Agriculture and Agrarian Reform
- In office 13 September 2003 – 14 April 2011
- Prime Minister: Muhammad Naji al-Otari
- Preceded by: Nabah Jabiri
- Succeeded by: Riyad Farid Hijab

Personal details
- Born: 1953 (age 72–73) Damascus, Syria
- Party: Ba'ath Party
- Other political affiliations: National Progressive Front
- Education: Damascus University; Superior National School of Agronomy and Food Industries
- Cabinet: Safar

Adel Safar (Arabic: عادل سفر, romanized: ʿĀdil Safar, born 1953) is a Syrian politician and academic, who served as Prime Minister of Syria from 14 April 2011 to 23 June 2012. His government was dissolved by Bashar al-Assad as a result of the Syrian parliamentary election in 2012. He was Minister of Agriculture and Agrarian Reform from 2003 to 2011.

== Early life and education ==
Safar was born in the Damascus countryside in Syria to a Sunni Muslim family. He earned a degree in Agronomy from the University of Damascus in 1977, a Diploma from the National School of Agronomy and Food Industries (ENSAIA) in Nancy, France in 1983, and a PhD in Biotechnology from ENSAIA in 1987.

== Early career ==
Summary:

- Agricultural Engineer at the Arab Center for the Studies of Arid Zones and Dry Lands (ACSAD), 1978–1981
- Deputy lecturer at ENSAIA, 1981–1987
- Deputy Dean for Administrative Affairs at the Faculty of Agriculture, Damascus University, 1992–1997
- Member of the Permanent Committee for Agricultural Research at Damascus University, 1996–2001
- Deputy Rapporteur of the Commission for Scientific Agricultural Research and Veterinary Medicine at the Supreme Council of Sciences, 1997–2001
- Dean of the Faculty of Agriculture, Damascus University, 1997–2000
- Member of the Advisory Committee of the Agricultural Productivity Administration at the Productive Projects Administration, 1999–2003
- Secretary of Damascus University Branch of Arab Socialist Ba'ath Party, 2000–2002
- Head of the National Committee for Man and the Biosphere Program in Syria, 2000–2004
- Head of the Arab Network of Man and Biosphere Program in the Arab world, 2001–2004
- Director-General of ACSAD, 2002–2003

Safar is also a member of the Economic Committee and a member of the High Council for Investment. He has been a member of the Ba'ath Party since 1990.

== Cabinet of Syria ==
In September 2003, he was appointed Minister of Agriculture and Agrarian Reform in the cabinet of Muhammad Naji al-Otari. On 29 March 2011, he resigned, along with the rest of the Cabinet, at the request of President Bashar al-Assad.

== Personal life ==
Safar is married with four children.

== See also ==
- Cabinet of Syria
- Politics of Syria

Political offices
Preceded by Muhammad Naji al-Otari	Prime Minister of Syria; 2011–2012	Succeeded by Riyad Farid Hijab
