= Cabinet of Syria =

- Emblem of Syria
- Formation: 8 December 2024 (23 months ago)
- Legal status: Provisional
- Location: Syria
- President of Syria: Ahmed al-Sharaa
- Ministries: 23

Following the fall of the Assad regime on 8 December 2024, Syria has been undergoing a political transition under the framework of a unitary presidential republic, with President Ahmed al-Sharaa leading the Syrian transitional government in accordance with the 2025 Constitutional Declaration. Under the Constitutional Declaration, executive power is concentrated in the hands of the president, who appoints ministers, dismisses them from their posts, and accepts their resignations.

The Syrian caretaker government was established after the regime's fall. Outgoing Prime Minister Mohammad Ghazi al-Jalali remained in office in a caretaker capacity until Mohammed al-Bashir was appointed prime minister by the Syrian General Command on 10 December 2024. On 29 March 2025, the caretaker government was replaced by the Syrian transitional government, which was announced by al-Sharaa during a ceremony at the People's Palace in Damascus.

== Cabinet under the Constitutional Declaration ==
On 13 March 2025, President Ahmed al-Sharaa ratified the 2025 Constitutional Declaration, which was declared to remain in effect for five years. The Constitutional Declaration establishes a presidential system in which executive power is concentrated in the hands of the president.

=== Cabinet composition ===
Under Article 31 of the Constitutional Declaration, the President appoints ministers, dismisses them from their posts, and accepts their resignations.

=== Oath of Ministers ===
The Constitutional Declaration provides for the following oath to be taken by ministers before the President:

I swear by Almighty God to perform my duties with honesty and sincerity.

— Constitutional Declaration, Article 32

== Cabinet in the transitional government ==
The Syrian caretaker government was formed following the fall of the Assad regime on 8 December 2024. Outgoing Prime Minister Mohammad Ghazi al-Jalali continued to serve in a caretaker capacity until Mohammed al-Bashir was designated as prime minister by the Syrian General Command on 10 December 2024. On 29 March 2025, the caretaker government was replaced by the Syrian transitional government, which was announced by Syrian President Ahmed al-Sharaa during a ceremony at the People's Palace in Damascus, where the new ministers were sworn in and delivered speeches outlining their agendas. The cabinet formed on 29 March 2025 included one woman, Hind Kabawat, and 22 men. Kabawat stated that she had unsuccessfully tried to convince the Syrian caretaker government to appoint more women as ministers in the new government. She said, "There is no excuse for having only one female minister."

On 9 May 2026, as part of a partial government reshuffle, al-Sharaa appointed Khaled Fawaz Zaarour and Basel al-Suweydan as the Ministers of Information and Agriculture, replacing Hamza al-Mustafa and Amjad Badr, respectively. The reshuffle was the first since the ouster of former President Bashar al-Assad.

=== Current cabinet ===
| Portfolio | Minister | Took office | Left office | Party | Ref |
|---|---|---|---|---|---|
| Minister of Interior | Anas Khattab | 29 March 2025 | Incumbent | Independent | |
| Minister of Defence | Murhaf Abu Qasra | 29 March 2025 | Incumbent | Independent | |
| Minister of Foreign Affairs and Expatriates | Asaad al-Shaibani | 29 March 2025 | Incumbent | Independent | |
| Minister of Justice | Mazhar al-Wais | 29 March 2025 | Incumbent | Independent | |
| Minister of Endowments | Mohammed Abu al-Khair Shukri | 29 March 2025 | Incumbent | Independent | |
| Minister of Higher Education and Scientific Research | Marwan al-Halabi | 29 March 2025 | Incumbent | Independent | |
| Minister of Social Affairs and Labor | Hind Kabawat | 29 March 2025 | Incumbent | Independent | |
| Minister of Energy | Mohammed al-Bashir | 29 March 2025 | Incumbent | Independent | |
| Minister of Finance | Mohammed Yisr Barnieh | 29 March 2025 | Incumbent | Independent | |
| Minister of Economy | Mohammad Nidal al-Shaar | 29 March 2025 | Incumbent | Independent | |
| Minister of Health | Musaab Nazzal al-Ali | 29 March 2025 | Incumbent | Independent | |
| Minister of Local Administration and Environment | Mohammed Anjrani | 29 March 2025 | Incumbent | Independent | |
| Minister of Emergency and Disaster Management | Raed al-Saleh | 29 March 2025 | Incumbent | Independent | |
| Minister of Communications and Information Technology | Abdul Salam Haykal | 29 March 2025 | Incumbent | Independent | |
| Minister of Agriculture | Amjad Badr | 29 March 2025 | 9 May 2026 | Independent | |
| Minister of Agriculture | Basel al-Suweydan | 9 May 2026 | Incumbent | Independent | |
| Minister of Education | Mohammad Abdul Rahman Tarkou | 29 March 2025 | Incumbent | Independent | |
| Minister of Public Works and Housing | Mustafa Abdul Razzaq | 29 March 2025 | Incumbent | Independent | |
| Minister of Culture | Mohammed Yassin Saleh | 29 March 2025 | Incumbent | Independent | |
| Minister of Sports and Youth | Mohammad Sameh Hamedh | 29 March 2025 | Incumbent | Independent | |
| Minister of Tourism | Mazen al-Salhani | 29 March 2025 | Incumbent | Independent | |
| Minister of Administrative Development | Mohammad Skaf | 29 March 2025 | Incumbent | Independent | |
| Minister of Transport | Yaarub Bader | 29 March 2025 | Incumbent | Independent | |
| Minister of Information | Hamza al-Mustafa | 29 March 2025 | 9 May 2026 | Independent | |
| Minister of Information | Khaled Fawaz Zaarour | 9 May 2026 | Incumbent | Independent | |
| Ministry of Industry, Internal Trade and Consumer Protection | Basel Abdul Hannan | 18 October 2026 | Incumbent | Independent | |

== Previous cabinets ==
- Second Mustafa Mero government (2001–2003)
- Muhammad Naji al-Otari government (2003–2011)
- Adel Safar government (2011–2012)
- Riyad Hijab government (2012)
- First Wael al-Halqi government (2012–2014)
- Second Wael al-Halqi government (2014–2016)
- Imad Khamis government (2016–2020)
- First Arnous government (2020–2021)
- Second Arnous government (2021–2024)
- Mohammad Ghazi al-Jalali government (2024)
- Syrian caretaker government (2024–2025)

== See also ==
- Government of Syria
