= Imad Khamis government =

2016–2020 Syrian government

- 93rd government of the Syrian Arab Republic

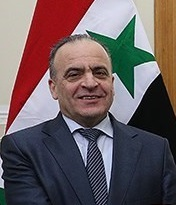
- Imad Khamis
- Date formed: 3 July 2016
- Date dissolved: 11 June 2020

People and organisations
- President: Bashar al-Assad
- Prime Minister: Imad Khamis
- Deputy Prime Minister: Walid Muallem
- Member parties: ▌Ba'ath Party; ▌Arab Socialist Union; ▌Communist Party (Unified); ▌Communist Party (Bakdash); ▌SSNP; ▌Socialist Unionist

History
- Election: 2016
- Outgoing election: 2020
- Legislature term: 2nd People's Assembly
- Predecessor: al-Halqi II
- Successor: Arnous I

The Imad Khamis government was the ninety-third government since the establishment of the modern Syrian state in 1918 and the seventh government to serve under the presidency of Bashar al-Assad. Formed on 3 July 2016 by Decree No. 203, the cabinet was sworn in on 11 July 2016 following the 2016 Syrian parliamentary election.

The government was established after the legislative elections held on 13 April 2016 and introduced a significant cabinet reshuffle, with fifteen new ministers appointed, including five Ministers of State. The changes reflected an effort to reorganise the government during the ongoing Syrian civil war while maintaining the existing political framework under the Arab Socialist Ba'ath Party.

During its tenure, the government oversaw state administration amid continued armed conflict, economic deterioration, and international sanctions, while coordinating reconstruction planning in government-controlled areas and managing public services under wartime conditions. The cabinet remained in office until 11 June 2020, when Prime Minister Imad Khamis was dismissed by President Bashar al-Assad. Hussein Arnous was tasked with the duties of the Prime Minister, and the government continued until it was eventually succeeded by the First Hussein Arnous government on 30 August.

== Composition ==
Portfolio	Minister	Took office	Left office	Party
Prime Minister	Imad Khamis	3 July 2016	11 June 2020	Ba'ath Party
Deputy Prime Minister	Walid Muallem	23 June 2012	30 August 2020	Ba'ath Party
Minister of Defense	Fahd Jassem al-Freij	18 July 2012	1 January 2018	Ba'ath Party
Minister of Defense	Ali Abdullah Ayyoub	1 January 2018	30 August 2020	Ba'ath Party
Minister of Foreign Affairs and Expatriates	Walid Muallem	21 February 2006	30 August 2020	Ba'ath Party
Minister of Endowments	Mohammed Abdul Sattar	8 December 2007	30 August 2020	Ba'ath Party
Minister of Presidential Affairs	Mansour Fadlallah Azzam	23 June 2012	30 August 2020	Independent
Minister of Interior	Mohammad al-Shaar	14 April 2011	26 November 2018	Ba'ath Party
Minister of Interior	Mohammad al-Rahmoun	26 November 2018	30 August 2020	Ba'ath Party
Minister of Education	Hazwan al-Waz	23 June 2012	26 November 2018	Ba'ath Party
Minister of Education	Imad al-Azab	26 November 2018	30 August 2020	Ba'ath Party
Minister of Justice	Najm Hamad al-Ahmad	16 August 2012	29 March 2017	Ba'ath Party
Minister of Justice	Hisham al-Shaar	29 March 2017	30 August 2020	Independent
Minister of Public Works and Housing	Hussein Arnous	27 August 2014	26 November 2018	Ba'ath Party
Minister of Public Works and Housing	Suhail Mohammad Abdullatif	26 November 2018	30 August 2020	Independent
Minister of Agriculture and Agrarian Reform	Ahmed Al-Qadri	27 August 2014	30 August 2020	Ba'ath Party
Minister of Tourism	Bishr al-Yaziji	27 August 2014	26 November 2018	Ba'ath Party
Minister of Tourism	Mohammad Rami Radwan Martini	26 November 2018	30 August 2020	Independent
Minister of Administrative Development	Hassan al-Nouri	27 August 2014	29 March 2017	NIACS
Minister of Administrative Development	Salam Safaf	29 March 2017	30 August 2020	Independent
Minister of Health	Nizar Wahbeh Yazigi	27 August 2014	30 August 2020	Ba'ath Party
Minister of Social Affairs and Labor	Rima al-Qadiri	20 August 2015	30 August 2020	Ba'ath Party
Minister of Industry	Ahmad al-Hamo	3 July 2016	1 January 2018	Ba'ath Party
Minister of Industry	Mohammad Mazen Ali Yousef	1 January 2018	26 November 2018	Independent
Minister of Industry	Mohammad Maan Zein al-Abidin Jazba	26 November 2018	30 August 2020	Independent
Minister of Economy and Foreign Trade	Adib Mayaleh	3 July 2016	29 March 2017	Independent
Minister of Economy and Foreign Trade	Mohammad Samer al-Khalil	29 March 2017	30 August 2020	Independent
Minister of Higher Education	Atef Naddaf	3 July 2016	26 November 2018	Ba'ath Party
Minister of Higher Education	Bassam Bashir Ibrahim	26 November 2018	30 August 2020	Independent
Minister of Local Administration and Environment	Hussein Makhlouf	3 July 2016	30 August 2020	Ba'ath Party
Minister of Communications and Technology	Ali al-Zafir	3 July 2016	26 November 2018	Independent
Minister of Communications and Technology	Iyad al-Khatib	26 November 2018	30 August 2020	Independent
Minister of Oil and Mineral Resources	Ali Ghanem	3 July 2016	30 August 2020	Independent
Minister of Information	Mohammad Ramiz Tourjman	3 July 2016	1 January 2018	Ba'ath Party
Minister of Information	Imad Abdullah Sarah	1 January 2018	30 August 2020	Independent
Minister of Culture	Mohammad al-Ahmad	3 July 2016	30 August 2020	Independent
Minister of Transport	Ali Hammoud	3 July 2016	30 August 2020	Ba'ath Party
Minister of Electricity	Mohammad Zouhair Kharboutli	3 July 2016	30 August 2020	Ba'ath Party
Minister of Finance	Mamoun Hamdan	3 July 2016	30 August 2020	Independent
Minister of Water Resources	Nabil al-Hassan	3 July 2016	26 November 2018	Independent
Minister of Water Resources	Hussein Arnous	26 November 2018	30 August 2020	Ba'ath Party
Minister of Internal Trade and Consumer Protection	Abdullah al-Gharbi	3 July 2016	26 November 2018	Ba'ath Party
Minister of Internal Trade and Consumer Protection	Atef Naddaf	26 November 2018	11 May 2020	Ba'ath Party
Minister of Internal Trade and Consumer Protection	Talal al-Barazi	11 May 2020	30 August 2020	Ba'ath Party
Minister of State for National Reconciliation Affairs	Ali Haidar	23 June 2012	26 November 2018	SSNP
Minister of State for Southern Regional Development Projects	Rafe' Abu Sa'ad	3 July 2016	30 August 2020	Communist (Bakdash)
Minister of State for Investment Affairs	Wafika Hosni	3 July 2016	30 August 2020	Communist (Unified)
Minister of State	Salwa Abdullah	3 July 2016	30 August 2020	ASU
Minister of State	Abdullah Sallum Abdullah	3 July 2016	30 August 2020	Socialist Unionist

== See also ==
- Council of Ministers (Syria)
- List of Syrian governments
- Government ministries of Syria
- List of prime ministers of Syria
