= Second Hussein Arnous government =

2021–2024 Syrian government

- 95th government of the Syrian Arab Republic

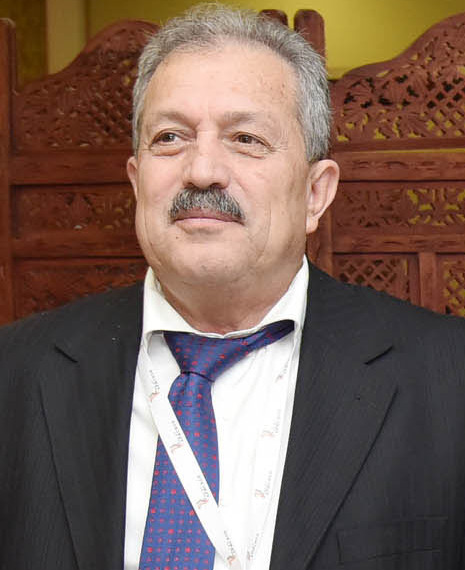
- Hussein Arnous
- Date formed: 10 August 2021
- Date dissolved: 23 September 2024 (from 29 July Caretaker gov.)

People and organisations
- President: Bashar al-Assad
- Prime Minister: Hussein Arnous; Mohammad Ghazi al-Jalali (As caretaker)
- Prime Minister's history: Arnous I
- Deputy Prime Minister: Ali Abdullah Ayyoub (until 2022)
- No. of ministers: 30
- Member parties: ▌Ba'ath Party; ▌SSNP; ▌Arab Socialist Union; ▌Communist Party (Unified); ▌Communist Party (Bakdash); ▌ADUP; ▌Socialist Unionist
- Status in legislature: Majority government 183 / 250 (73%)

History
- Election: –
- Outgoing election: 2024
- Legislature term: 3rd People's Assembly
- Budget: LS 35,500 billion (Note: US$5 billion)
- Predecessor: Arnous I
- Successor: al-Jalali

The Second Hussein Arnous government was the ninety-fifth government since the establishment of the modern Syrian state in 1918 and the ninth government to serve under the presidency of Bashar al-Assad. Formed on 10 August 2021 by Presidential Decree No. 208, the government was sworn in on 14 August 2021 following the 2021 Syrian presidential election, in which Bashar al-Assad secured a fourth seven-year term in office.

The government comprised thirty ministers, including twenty-five members of the previous government and five new appointees, among them three Ministers of State. Women held three government posts, accounting for 10 per cent of the ministry. Before its formation, President Bashar al-Assad had tasked Hussein Arnous with forming a new government by Presidential Decree No. 206 of 1 August 2021.

During its tenure, the government underwent several reshuffles. In April 2022, Ali Mahmoud Abbas was appointed Minister of Defence, while further changes in March 2023 affected the ministries of Oil and Mineral Resources, Internal Trade and Consumer Protection, Industry, and Social Affairs and Labour. Additional appointments followed in August and December 2023, including a new Minister of Education and changes to the ministries of Water Resources and Local Administration and Environment. In December 2023, the Ministry of Presidential Affairs was replaced by the newly established General Secretariat of the Presidency of the Republic, and in July 2024 the Ministry of Communications and Technology was reorganised as the Ministry of Communications and Information Technology.

The government continued to administer Syria amid the ongoing aftermath of the Syrian civil war, overseeing reconstruction efforts, economic management, and public administration while the country remained subject to extensive international sanctions.

== Composition ==
| Portfolio | Minister | Took office | Left office | Party |
|---|---|---|---|---|
| Prime Minister | Hussein Arnous | 30 August 2020 | 29 September 2024 | Ba'ath Party |
| Deputy Prime Minister | Ali Abdullah Ayyoub | 30 August 2020 | 23 September 2024 | Ba'ath Party |
| Minister of Defense | Ali Abdullah Ayyoub | 1 January 2018 | 28 April 2022 | Ba'ath Party |
| Minister of Defense | Ali Mahmoud Abbas | 28 April 2022 | 8 December 2024 | Ba'ath Party |
| Minister of Foreign Affairs and Expatriates | Faisal Mekdad | 22 November 2020 | 23 September 2024 | Ba'ath Party |
| Minister of Endowments | Mohammed Abdul Sattar | 8 December 2007 | 10 December 2024 | Ba'ath Party |
| Minister of Presidential Affairs | Mansour Fadlallah Azzam | 23 June 2012 | 13 December 2023 | Independent |
| Minister of Local Administration and Environment | Hussein Makhlouf | 3 July 2016 | 13 December 2023 | Ba'ath Party |
| Minister of Local Administration and Environment | Lamia Chakkour | 13 December 2023 | 23 September 2024 | Independent |
| Minister of Administrative Development | Salam Safaf | 29 March 2017 | 10 December 2024 | Independent |
| Minister of Social Affairs and Labor | Mohamed Seif El-Din | 10 August 2021 | 29 March 2023 | Ba'ath Party |
| Minister of Social Affairs and Labor | Louai Emad El-Din al-Munajjid | 29 March 2023 | 23 September 2024 | Independent |
| Minister of Economy and Foreign Trade | Mohammad Samer al-Khalil | 29 March 2017 | 23 September 2024 | Independent |
| Minister of Information | Boutros Al-Hallaq | 10 August 2021 | 23 September 2024 | Independent |
| Minister of Interior | Mohammad Khaled al-Rahmoun | 26 November 2018 | 8 December 2024 | Ba'ath Party |
| Minister of Tourism | Mohammad Rami Radwan Martini | 26 November 2018 | 10 December 2024 | Independent |
| Minister of Higher Education and Scientific Research | Bassam Bashir Ibrahim | 26 November 2018 | 23 September 2024 | Independent |
| Minister of Public Works and Housing | Suhail Mohammad Abdullatif | 26 August 2020 | 23 September 2024 | Independent |
| Minister of Communications and Technology | Iyad al-Khatib | 26 December 2018 | 10 December 2024 | Independent |
| Minister of Internal Trade and Consumer Protection | Amr Salem | 10 August 2021 | 29 March 2023 | Independent |
| Minister of Internal Trade and Consumer Protection | Mohsen Abdel Karim Ali | 29 March 2023 | 23 September 2024 | Independent |
| Minister of Culture | Lubanah Mshaweh | 30 August 2020 | 23 September 2024 | Independent |
| Minister of Education | Darem Tabbaa | 30 August 2020 | 8 August 2023 | Independent |
| Minister of Education | Muhammad Amer Mardini | 8 August 2023 | 26 November 2024 | Independent |
| Minister of Justice | Ahmad al-Sayyed | 30 August 2020 | 10 December 2024 | Ba'ath Party |
| Minister of Water Resources | Tammam Raad | 30 August 2020 | 13 December 2023 | Ba'ath Party |
| Minister of Water Resources | Hussein Makhlouf | 13 December 2023 | 23 September 2024 | Ba'ath Party |
| Minister of Finance | Kenan Yaghi | 30 August 2020 | 23 September 2024 | Independent |
| Minister of Transport | Zouhair Khazim | 30 August 2020 | 10 December 2024 | Ba'ath Party |
| Minister of Oil and Mineral Resources | Bassam Tohme | 30 August 2020 | 29 March 2023 | Independent |
| Minister of Oil and Mineral Resources | Firas Hassan Kaddour | 29 March 2023 | 10 December 2024 | Independent |
| Minister of Health | Hassan al-Ghabbash | 30 August 2020 | 23 September 2024 | Independent |
| Minister of Industry | Ziyad Sabbagh | 30 August 2020 | 29 March 2023 | Ba'ath Party |
| Minister of Industry | Abdel Qader Jokhadar | 29 March 2023 | 23 September 2024 | Independent |
| Minister of Agriculture and Agrarian Reform | Mohammed Hassan Qatana | 30 August 2020 | 23 September 2024 | Independent |
| Minister of Electricity | Ghassan al-Zamel | 30 August 2020 | 23 September 2024 | Independent |
| Minister of State for Investment Affairs and Vital Projects | Mohammad Fayez al-Barasha | 30 August 2020 | 29 March 2023 | Communist (Bakdash) |
| Minister of State for Investment Affairs and Vital Projects | Ahmed Bustaji | 29 March 2023 | 10 December 2024 | Communist (Unified) |
| Minister of State for People's Assembly Affairs | Abdullah Sallum Abdullah | 10 August 2021 | 23 September 2024 | Socialist Unionist |
| Minister of State for Southern Regional Development Projects | Diala Barakat | 10 August 2021 | 23 September 2024 | SSNP |

== See also ==
- Council of Ministers (Syria)
- List of Syrian governments
- Government ministries of Syria
- List of prime ministers of Syria
- Politics of Syria
- Political parties in Syria
