= First Hussein Arnous government =

2020-2021 Syrian government

- 94th government of the Syrian Arab Republic

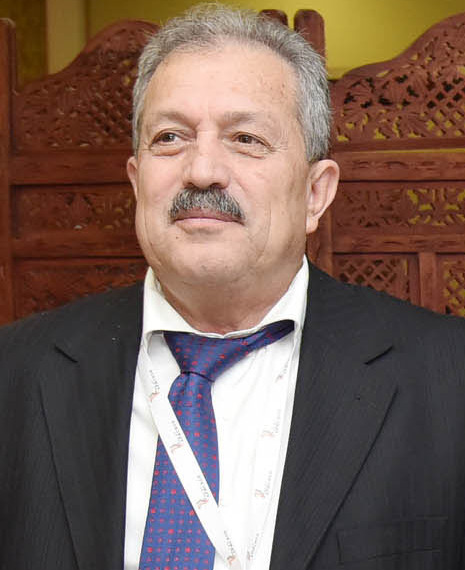
- Hussein Arnous
- Date formed: 30 August 2020
- Date dissolved: 10 August 2021 (from 17 July Caretaker gov.)

People and organisations
- President: Bashar al-Assad
- Prime Minister: Hussein Arnous
- Deputy Prime Minister: Ali Abdullah Ayyoub; Walid Muallem (until death)
- No. of ministers: 29
- Member parties: ▌Ba'ath Party; ▌Arab Socialist Union; ▌Communist Party (Unified); ▌Communist Party (Bakdash); ▌ADUP; ▌Socialist Unionist
- Status in legislature: Majority government 183 / 250 (73%)

History
- Election: 2020
- Legislature term: 3rd People's Assembly
- Budget: LS 8,500 billion
- Predecessor: Khamis
- Successor: Arnous II

The First Hussein Arnous government was the ninety-fourth government since the establishment of the modern Syrian state in 1918 and the eighth government to serve under the presidency of Bashar al-Assad. Formed on 30 August 2020 by Decree No. 221, the government was sworn in on 2 September 2020 following the 2020 Syrian parliamentary election.

The government was established after the parliamentary elections held on 19 July 2020. It comprised twenty-nine ministers, including fifteen members of the previous government and fourteen new appointees, among them three Ministers of State. Several ministers changed portfolios, including Salwa Abdullah, who was reassigned from Minister of State to Minister of Social Affairs and Labour. The government also marked the return of Lubanah Mshaweh as Minister of Culture, a position she had previously held in the First Wael al-Halqi government. President Bashar al-Assad had tasked Hussein Arnous with forming the government on 25 August 2020 under Decree No. 210.

Following the death of Walid Muallem on November 16, Presidential Decree No. 322 of November 22, 2020 was issued, which was Dr. Faisal Mekdad appointed Minister of Foreign Affairs and Expatriates.

The government continued to administer Syria during the ongoing Syrian civil war, overseeing state institutions amid continuing economic difficulties, international sanctions, and reconstruction efforts in government-controlled areas. It remained in office until August 2021, when it was succeeded by a second government headed by Hussein Arnous following the 2021 Syrian presidential election.

== Composition ==
Portfolio	Minister	Took office	Left office	Party
Prime Minister	Hussein Arnous	30 August 2020	10 August 2021	Ba'ath Party
Deputy Prime Minister	Walid Muallem	23 June 2012	16 November 2020	Ba'ath Party
Deputy Prime Minister	Ali Abdullah Ayyoub	30 August 2020	10 August 2021	Ba'ath Party
Minister of Defense	Ali Abdullah Ayyoub	1 January 2018	10 August 2021	Ba'ath Party
Minister of Foreign Affairs and Expatriates	Walid Muallem	21 February 2006	16 November 2020	Ba'ath Party
Minister of Foreign Affairs and Expatriates	Faisal Mekdad	22 November 2020	10 August 2021	Ba'ath Party
Minister of Interior	Mohammad Khaled al-Rahmoun	26 November 2018	10 August 2021	Ba'ath Party
Minister of Presidential Affairs	Mansour Fadlallah Azzam	23 June 2012	10 August 2021	
Minister of Justice	Ahmad al-Sayyed	30 August 2020	10 August 2021	Ba'ath Party
Minister of Finance	Kenan Yaghi	30 August 2020	10 August 2021	
Minister of Local Administration and Environment	Hussein Makhlouf	3 July 2016	10 August 2021	Ba'ath Party
Minister of Endowments	Mohammed Abdul Sattar	8 December 2007	10 August 2021	Ba'ath Party
Minister of Education	Darem Tabbaa	30 August 2020	10 August 2021	
Minister of Higher Education and Scientific Research	Bassam Bashir Ibrahim	26 November 2018	10 August 2021	
Minister of Health	Hassan al-Ghabbash	30 August 2020	10 August 2021	
Minister of Social Affairs and Labor	Salwa Abdullah	30 August 2020	10 August 2021	ASU
Minister of Administrative Development	Salam Safaf	29 March 2017	10 August 2021	
Minister of Water Resources	Tammam Raad	30 August 2020	10 August 2021	Ba'ath Party
Minister of Agriculture and Agrarian Reform	Mohammed Hassan Qatana	30 August 2020	10 August 2021	
Minister of Industry	Ziyad Sabbagh	30 August 2020	10 August 2021	Ba'ath Party
Minister of Internal Trade and Consumer Protection	Talal Al-Barazi	11 May 2020	10 August 2021	Ba'ath Party
Minister of Economy and Foreign Trade	Mohammad Samer al-Khalil	29 March 2017	10 August 2021	
Minister of Electricity	Ghassan al-Zamel	30 August 2020	10 August 2021	
Minister of Oil and Mineral Resources	Bassam Tohme	30 August 2020	10 August 2021	
Minister of Transport	Zouhair Khazim	30 August 2020	10 August 2021	Ba'ath Party
Minister of Communications and Technology	Iyad al-Khatib	26 December 2018	10 August 2021	
Minister of Public Works and Housing	Suhail Mohammad Abdullatif	26 November 2018	10 August 2021	
Minister of Information	Imad Abullah Sarah	1 January 2018	10 August 2021	
Minister of Culture	Lubanah Mshaweh	30 August 2020	10 August 2021	
Minister of Tourism	Mohammad Rami Radwan Martini	26 November 2018	10 August 2021	
Minister of State for Investment Affairs and Vital Projects	Mohammad Fayez al-Barasha	30 August 2020	10 August 2021	Communist (Bakdash)
Minister of State for Southern Regional Development Projects	Mohammad Samir Haddad	30 August 2020	10 August 2021	ADUP
Minister of State for People's Assembly Affairs	Maloul al-Hussein	30 August 2020	10 August 2021	Communist (Unified)

== See also ==
- Council of Ministers (Syria)
- List of Syrian governments
- Government ministries of Syria
- List of prime ministers of Syria
