= Hussein Arnous government =

Hussein Arnous government may refer to the following governments of Syria led by Hussein Arnous:

- First Hussein Arnous government, 2020–2021
- Second Hussein Arnous government, from 2021

== See also ==
- Cabinet of Syria
