= Ziyad al-Din al-Ayyubi =

Syrian preacher and politician (1946–2023)

Minister of Endowments
- In office 3 October 2004 – 7 December 2007
- President: Bashar al-Assad
- Prime Minister: Muhammad Naji al-Otari
- Preceded by: Mohammed Abdel Raouf Ziadeh
- Succeeded by: Mohammed Abdul Sattar

Personal details
- Born: 1946 Damascus, Syria
- Died: 8 November 2023 (aged 76–77) Damascus, Syria
- Party: Independent
- Education: Damascus University; University of Karachi
- Occupation: Preacher

Ziyad al-Din al-Ayyubi (Arabic: زياد الدين الأيوبي; 1946 – 8 November 2023) was a Syrian preacher and politician. An independent, he served as Minister of Endowments from 2004 to 2007.

He was dismissed from his position in 2007.

Sources suggested that al-Ayyubi was dismissed due to his involvement in corruption cases.

Al-Ayyubi died in Damascus on 8 November 2023.
