= Hind Kabawat =

Syrian politician and activist (born 1974)

- هند قبوات
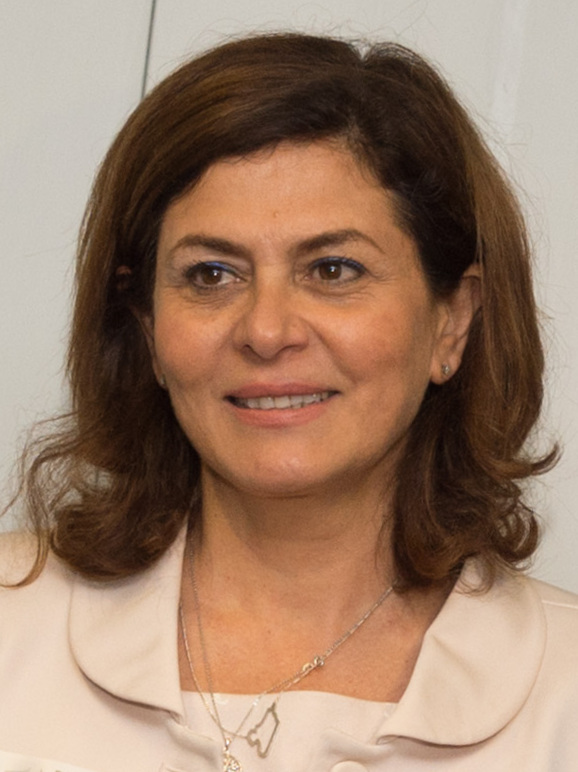
- Kabawat in 2016

Minister of Social Affairs and Labor
- Incumbent
- Assumed office 29 March 2025
- President: Ahmed al-Sharaa
- Preceded by: Samar al-Sebai

Personal details
- Born: 1974 (age 51–52) India
- Education: University of Damascus (B.A. in Commerce and Economics); Fletcher School of Law and Diplomacy, Tufts University (Master's in Law and Diplomacy); Beirut Arab University (Law degree)
- Occupation: Professor, Researcher, Civil rights activist, Politician
- Awards: 2007 – Peacemakers in Action Award, Tanenbaum Center for Interreligious Understanding; 2009 – Public Diplomacy Award, George Mason University
- Website: https://web.archive.org/web/20160110063208/https://www.hindkabawat.com/

Hind Aboud Kabawat (Arabic: هند قبوات, romanized: Hind Qubwāt; born 1974) is a Syrian-Canadian politician who is currently the minister of social and labour affairs in the Syrian transitional government since 2025.

Kabawat was previously Director of Interfaith Peacebuilding at George Mason University's Center for World Religions, Diplomacy, and Conflict Resolution. During the Syrian civil war, she was active in the opposition and served as deputy head of the Syrian Negotiation Commission's Geneva Office. After the fall of the Assad regime, she was appointed by the presidency of Syria as a member of the Preparatory Committee for the Syrian National Dialogue Conference in February 2025.

== Early life and education ==
Kabawat was born in India and grew up in London and Egypt. She attended school at a Christian convent in Damascus and then at the Lycée Francais Charles de Gaulle in London.

Kabawat has a BA in Economics from Damascus University, and a law degree from Beirut Arab University. She holds an MA in International Relations from Fletcher School at Tufts University of Law and Diplomacy, and certificates in Conflict Resolution and Strategy Leadership from the University of Toronto and in Negotiation from Harvard University.

== Career ==
From 1989 to 2014, Kabawat worked as an international councillor in various law firms in Toronto.

In 2004, Kabawat became the Director of Interfaith Peacebuilding at George Mason University's Center for World Religions, Diplomacy, and Conflict Resolution (CRDC). As part of her position at CRDC, she has directed CRDC's Syria program, in which she taught Syrian students conflict resolution and civil society development. She resigned from this position in 2025 to join the Syrian transitional government.

A member of the Syrian opposition during the civil war, Kabawat served as the deputy head of the Syrian Negotiation Commission's Geneva Office, which was headed by Ambassador Abdullatif Dabbagh, former Syrian ambassador to the UAE. The Syrian Negotiation Commission was formerly known as the High Negotiations Committee (HNC). In her position at the then HNC, she participated in all eight rounds of the 2017 Geneva peace talks on Syria.

In 2015, Kabawat co-founded Tastakel, a women's center dedicated to using non-violence and dialogue to address the conflict in Syria. This includes the running of multiple women's centers in Syria which provide education and counseling services, as well as hosting workshops on political engagement and peace-building for Syrian women both inside Syria and living as refugees in neighboring countries.

Until 2015, Kabawat was a Senior Program Officer at the United States Institute of Peace. She formerly served as an advisory board member and consultant for the World Bank and was a frequent contributor to the Huffington Post.

In February 2025, following the earlier fall of the Assad regime, Kabawat was appointed by the presidency of Syria as a member of the Preparatory Committee for the Syrian National Dialogue Conference. On 29 March 2025, she was appointed Minister of Social and Labour Affairs as the only woman and Christian in the transitional government.

== Awards ==
In 2007, Kabawat was named a Peacemaker in Action by the Tanenbaum Center for Interreligious Understanding. In 2009, she received the Public Diplomacy Award from CRDC at George Mason University.

== Personal life ==
Kabawat is Catholic. She has two children and lives in the Bab Touma neighbourhood in Damascus with her husband, who is a businessman.
