= Mohamed Seif El-Din =

Syrian politician

HE Mohamed Seif El-Din محمد سيف الدين

Minister of Social Affairs and Labour
- In office 10 August 2021 – 29 March 2023
- President: Bashar al-Assad
- Prime Minister: Hussein Arnous
- Preceded by: Salwa Abdullah
- Succeeded by: Louai Emad El-Din al-Munajjid

Personal details
- Born: 1965 (age 60–61) Rif Dimashq Governorate, Syria
- Children: 2
- Education: Damascus University
- Occupation: Bachelor of Arts
- Profession: Politician

Mohamed Seif El-Din (Arabic: محمد سيف الدين) (born 1965) is a Syrian politician. Between 2021 and 2023, he was Minister of Social Affairs and Labour. He had previously served as Assistant to the Minister of Public Works and Housing for Legal Affairs and Services. He was educated at Damascus University, where he studied law.

== Career ==
2004–2012: Director of Administrative Affairs at the Ministry of Public Works

2012–2021: Assistant to the Minister of Public Works and Housing for Legal Affairs and Services

== Personal life ==
Married with two children.

== See also ==
- Second Hussein Arnous government
