= Mohammed al-Ahmed =

Mohammed al-Ahmed may refer to:

- Mohammed Taha al-Ahmed, Syrian politician
- Mohammed Younis al-Ahmed, Iraqi military officer and member of the Iraqi Ba'ath Party
