= Mohammed Hassan Qatana =

Syrian politician

His Excellency Mohammed Hassan Qatana
- محمد حسان قطنا

Minister of Agriculture and Agrarian Reform
- In office 30 August 2020 – 23 September 2024
- President: Bashar al-Assad
- Prime Minister: Hussein Arnous
- Preceded by: Ahmed Al-Qadri
- Succeeded by: Fayez al-Miqdad

Personal details
- Born: 1960 (age 65–66) Damascus, Damascus Governorate, Syria
- Children: 2
- Education: Agricultural Engineering University
- Profession: Public servant, Politician

Mohammed Hassan Qatana (Arabic: محمد حسان قطنا) is a Syrian agricultural engineer and politician. He served as Minister of Agriculture and Agrarian Reform between 2020 and 2024.

== Career ==
In 1982, Hassan Qatana graduated from Agricultural Engineering University.

From 2004 to 2011, he was director of Planning and statistics From 2008 to 2010, he was director of Agricultural Production Support Fund and director of Planning and International Cooperation Before his government appointment in 2020, he was director of the World Food Programme project in Syria. He was Minister of Agriculture and Agrarian Reform from 2020 to 2024.

He was sanctioned by several European countries for his involvement with the al-Assad regime.

== See also ==
- First Hussein Arnous government
- Second Hussein Arnous government
