= Mohammad Samer al-Khalil =

Syrian politician

His Excellency Mohammad Samer al-Khalil
- محمد سامر الخليل

Minister of Industry
- In office 23 September 2024 – 8 December 2024
- President: Bashar al-Assad
- Prime Minister: Mohammad Ghazi al-Jalali
- Preceded by: Abdel Qader Jokhadar
- Succeeded by: Basel Abdul Hannan

Minister of Economy and Foreign Trade
- In office 29 March 2017 – 23 September 2024
- President: Bashar al-Assad
- Prime Minister: Imad Khamis; Hussein Arnous
- Preceded by: Adeeb Mayala
- Succeeded by: Mohammad Rabie Qalaaji

Personal details
- Born: 1977 (age 48–49) Damascus, Syria
- Education: Damascus University
- Profession: Politician, Civil servant

Mohammad Samer al-Khalil (Arabic: محمد سامر الخليل; born 1977) is a Syrian politician. He was served as Minister of Industry.

== Career ==
He served in the Imad Khamis government, the First Hussein Arnous government and the Second Hussein Arnous government.

He attended Expo 2020 and signed a trade deal with Emirati economy minister Abdulla bin Touq Al Marri.
