= Ziyad Sabbagh =

Syrian politician

HE Ziyad Sabbagh زياد صباغ

Minister of Industry
- In office 30 August 2020 – 29 March 2023
- President: Bashar al-Assad
- Prime Minister: Hussein Arnous
- Preceded by: Mohamed Mazen Ali Yousef
- Succeeded by: Abdel Qader Jokhadar

Personal details
- Born: 1960 (age 65–66) Aleppo, Aleppo Governorate, United Arab Republic
- Education: Aleppo University
- Profession: Politician, Civil servant

Ziyad Sabbagh (Arabic: زياد صباغ) (born 1960) is a Syrian politician who was Minister of Industry between 2020 and 2023.

== Education and career ==
1986: Graduated from the Faculty of Science of Aleppo University and administrative information at the National Defense College.

2004-2013: General Manager of the General Industrial Company for Vegetable Oils in Aleppo Governorate

2005-2010: Member of the Board of Directors of Aleppo Industry Chamber

== See also ==
- First Hussein Arnous government
- Second Hussein Arnous government
