= Salwa Abdullah =

Ba'athist Syrian politician (born 1953)

- سلوى عبد الله

Minister of Social Affairs and Labour
- In office 30 August 2020 – 10 August 2021
- President: Bashar al-Assad
- Prime Minister: Hussein Arnous
- Preceded by: Rima al-Qadiri
- Succeeded by: Mohamed Seif El-Din

Personal details
- Born: 1953 (age 72–73) Quneitra, Idlib, Syria
- Profession: Politician, Doctor

Salwa Abdullah (Arabic: سلوى عبد الله; born 1953) is a Syrian doctor and politician who was Minister of Social Affairs and Labour in the First Hussein Arnous government.
