= National Agricultural Policy Center =

Syrian research institute

National Agricultural Policy Center المركز الوطني للسياسات الزراعية
- Abbreviation: NAPC
- Formation: 2000
- Type: Research institute
- Headquarters: Damascus, Syria
- Director: Atieh al-Hindi

The National Agricultural Policy Center (NAPC) (Arabic: المركز الوطني للسياسات الزراعية), was established in 2000 through the work of the Project GCP/SYR/006/ITA of the Food and Agriculture Organization (FAO) of the United Nations, funded by the Government of Italy, to be part of the Syrian Ministry of Agriculture and Agrarian Reform. The project is now in its third phase. It is a center of research and analysis in the field of agricultural policies in Syria, and therefore strives to provide policy analysis for relevant stakeholders and policymakers in the field.

== History ==
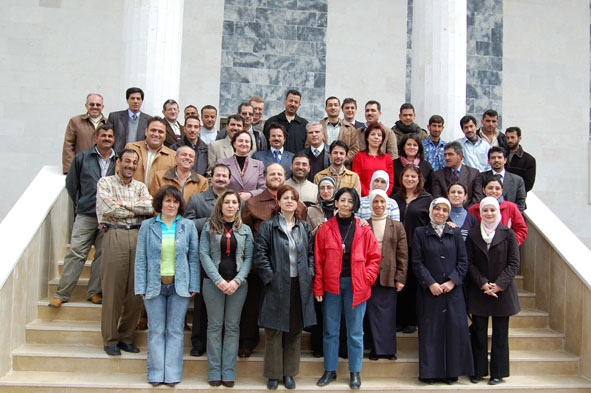
NAPC and Project Staff at the NAPC Premises in 2007

The FAO Project GCP/SYR/006/ITA started in April 1998, and sought to respond to the Government of Syria's initiative to move from a socially planned economy to a social market economy. After background work and training from the Project the NAPC was established in 2000 as part of the Project's first phase (April 1998 - October 2001). In the second phase (November 2001 - October 2004) of the Project training was delivered to the now fully staffed NAPC, an organizational structure was developed and a mid-term work-plan established. In third phase (November 2004 - October 2007), the Project assisted in consolidating the work of the NAPC with a view to its future independence and sustainability.

== Establishment Aims ==
To meet the long as well as short-term needs of decision-makers for in-depth and rigorous analysis for policy options on issues of relevance. Including:

- undertaking policy analysis studies enabling the formulation of integrated, coherent and effective agricultural strategies and policies
- suggesting policy directives to help relieve and overcome agricultural problems and constraints
- preparing and publishing policy studies and reports to enable the integration of the agricultural sector within the economy
- conducting training courses with a view to helping in the capacity building in policy analysis and planning within the Syrian Ministry of Agriculture and Agrarian Reform and other related Ministries and Institutions.

== NAPC Structure and Focus Areas ==
The NAPC is divided into four different divisions, each with a specific mandate related to the subject of agricultural policy analysis in Syria. These divisions are as follows: Trade Policy (TPD), Agro-Food (AFD), Rural Development (RDD) and Information and Communications (InfoCom). The focus areas of each division can be given as follows:

=== Trade Policy ===
- International Trade Agreements
- Investment
- Trade Policy
- Agricultural Marketing
- Competitiveness

=== Agro-Food ===
- Comparative Advantage Studies
- Supply and Demand
- Food Policy
- Food Standards

=== Rural Development ===
- Gender
- Poverty
- Migration
- Natural Resource Management
- Sustainable Development
- Nutrition and Food Security

=== Information and Communication ===
- Syrian Agricultural Database
- Event Organization
- Publications
- ICT in Agriculture
- Library Services
- ICT for Development

== Publications ==
The major publications of the NAPC are the two Periodical Reports that it produces. One of which, Syrian Agricultural Trade (SAT) is published annually, the other of which, The State of Food and Agriculture in Syria (SOFAS) is biannual. These are studies which give a regular overview of the situation of agriculture and agricultural trade in Syria.

In addition to these publications the NAPC regularly produces Policy Studies, Working Papers, and Policy Notes on a range of different issues. Furthermore, the NAPC makes available the proceedings of various seminars and workshops. All of the publications are made available through the NAPC website.

== Syrian Agricultural Database (SADB) ==
Is a fully disaggregated and detailed database for Syrian Agriculture based on FAOSTAT format. The database is browseable and searchable through the NAPC website and is made available to the general public. It includes data on areas such as trade, national economic data, census, inputs and outputs, production, natural resources, fertilizers, machinery. The SADB has been available since 2003 and is updated each year to reflect the most recent data available.
