= Imad Abdullah Sarah =

Syrian politician (born 1968)

Imad Abullah Sarah (born 1968) is a Syrian politician who served as Information Minister in the Imad Khamis government and First Hussein Arnous government.
