= Hussam Haj Hussein =

Syrian minister (born 1977)

- حسام حاج حسين

Minister of Awqaf
- In office 10 December 2024 – 29 March 2025
- President: Ahmed al-Sharaa (Note: As de facto leader until 29 January 2025.)
- Prime Minister: Mohammed al-Bashir
- Preceded by: Mohammed Abdul Sattar
- Succeeded by: Mohammed Abu al-Khair Shukri

Minister of Religious Endowments and Guidance in the Syrian Salvation Government
- In office 2021 – 10 December 2024
- Prime Minister: Ali Keda; Mohammed al-Bashir
- Preceded by: Ibrahim Shasho
- Succeeded by: Position abolished

Personal details
- Born: 1977 (age 48–49) Idlib Governorate, Syria
- Party: Independent
- Other political affiliations: Hay'at Tahrir al-Sham (until 2025)
- Education: Damascus University
- Occupation: Politician, educator

Hussam Haj Hussein (Note: Arabic: حسام حاج حسين; born 1977) was the Minister of Endowments in the Syrian caretaker government between December 2024 and March 2025. He had previously served as Minister of Religious Endowments and Guidance in the Syrian Salvation Government since the fourth term of the government in 2021 until December 2024.

Haj Hussein graduated with a degree in Islamic Sharia and a diploma in educational qualification from Damascus University. He began his career as an Islamic education teacher in 2002, a role he held until the onset of the Syrian Civil War in 2011. During the Syrian revolution, he managed various responsibilities between 2012 and 2018.

In 2018, he was appointed Director of Religious Endowments in southern Idlib. The following year, in 2019, he became the Head of the Mosque Affairs Office within the Ministry of Religious Endowments if the salvation government. His administrative skills led to his promotion as Deputy Minister of Religious Endowments in 2020.

Haj Hussein was appointed Minister of Religious Endowments in the fourth term of the Syrian Salvation Government in 2021. He retained the position in the fifth term in 2022 and continues to serve in the government’s sixth term.

In 2024, following the fall of the Assad regime and the decision that ministers of the salvation government will serve in the same roles in the transitional government until March 2025, Haj Hussein began serving as minister of endowments in the Syrian caretaker government under prime minister Mohammed al-Bashir. He was later succeeded by Mohammed Abu al-Khair Shukri with the formation of the Syrian transitional government in March 2025.

== See also ==
- Cabinet of Syria
