= Fadi al-Qassem =

Syrian Politician (born 1983)

- فادي القاسم

Minister of Administrative Development
- In office 10 December 2024 – 29 March 2025
- President: Ahmed al-Sharaa
- Prime Minister: Mohammed al-Bashir
- De facto leader: Ahmed al-Sharaa (Note: As de facto leader until 29 January 2025.)
- Preceded by: Salam Safaf
- Succeeded by: Mohammad Skaf

Minister of Development and Humanitarian Affairs in the Syrian transitional government
- In office 28 February 2024 – 10 December 2024
- Prime Minister: Mohammed al-Bashir
- Succeeded by: Position abolished

Personal details
- Born: 1983 (age 42–43) Hama, Syria
- Party: Independent
- Other political affiliations: Hay'at Tahrir al-Sham (until 2025)
- Education: Degree in Applied Chemistry
- Profession: Politician

Fadi al-Qassem (Arabic: فادي القاسم) is a Syrian politician who served as the Minister of Administrative Development in the Syrian caretaker government under prime minister Mohammed al-Bashir from 10 December 2024 to 29 March 2025. He had also held the position of Minister of Development and Humanitarian Affairs in the Syrian Salvation Government.
