= Mohammed Abu al-Khair Shukri =

Syrian Minister of Endowments since 2025

- محمد أبو الخير شكري
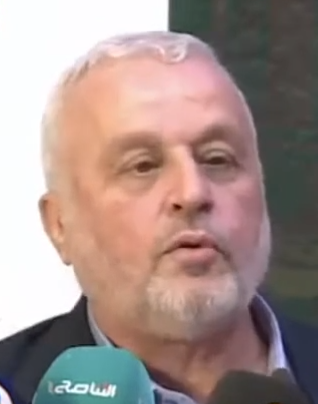
- Shukri in 2021

Minister of Endowments
- Incumbent
- Assumed office 29 March 2025
- President: Ahmed al-Sharaa
- Preceded by: Hussam Haj Hussein

Personal details
- Born: 30 April 1961 (age 65) Damascus, Northern Region, United Arab Republic
- Party: Independent (since 2025)

Mohammed Abu al-Khair Shukri (Note: Arabic: محمد أبو الخير شكري; born 30 April 1961) is a Syrian Islamic scholar, lawyer, and university professor who serves as the Minister of Endowments in the Syrian transitional government since 29 March 2025.

== Early life and education ==
Shukri was born in Damascus, Syria, (Note: Then part of the United Arab Republic as its Northern Region.) in the historic Sarouja district. His father, Mohammed Lutfi Shukri, was a student of Islamic scholars Sheikh Badr al-Din al-Hasani and Sheikh Abu al-Khair al-Maydani.

He completed his primary education at Muawiya School in Sarouja. He later attended Bassam Bakoura Preparatory School and Sami al-Droubi Secondary School, where he earned his high school diploma in 1979.

Shukri pursued higher education in multiple disciplines. He first graduated from the Faculty of Islamic Sciences in Damascus in 1987. Then he earned a law degree from Damascus University in 1991. After that, he studied at the Faculty of Arts at the Lebanese University for three years but did not graduate. In 1994, he obtained the title of "Master Lawyer" from the Damascus Bar Association with a thesis on alimony in Syrian personal status law and Islamic jurisprudence. Further, he completed a master's degree in Islamic studies at Minhaj-ul-Quran International University in Lahore, Pakistan, with a thesis on testimonial evidence in Islamic law and civil law. In 2010, he earned a doctorate in Islamic jurisprudence from Al-Da'wa University Institute in Beirut, Lebanon, with a dissertation on children's rights in Islamic law and international legislation.

== Academic and professional career ==
Shukri has taught various Islamic and legal subjects at academic institutions, including theology and Quranic exegesis at the Islamic Institute for Da'wa and Guidance in the Abu al-Nour Islamic Complex (1986–1988), Islamic jurisprudence at the Grand Hadith Scholar Institute (Sheikh Badr al-Din al-Hasani Institute) (1992–2012), international humanitarian law at the Damascus branch of Omdurman Islamic University (2010–2011), Objectives of Islamic law at Al-Sham Higher Institute (2010–2012), labor law at Omdurman Islamic University in 2011 and principles of Islamic jurisprudence at Al-Sham Higher Institute from 2011 to 2012.

== Organizational affiliations ==
Shukri has been involved with various religious and humanitarian organizations. He was a founding member of the Syrian Islamic Council and the Syrian Scholars Association. He was President of Khair al-Sham Social Association. He was vice president of the Dialogue of Civilizations Association. He was a member of the board of trustees of Sheikh Badr al-Din al-Hasani Association, the Syrian Reconciliation Council and of the Syrian National Coalition. Further, he was a chairman of the Supreme Hajj Committee (2013) and advisor to the Supreme Hajj Committee.

Other previous roles of Shukri include director of Sheikh Badr al-Din al-Hasani Association, legal and religious advisor at Balqis Ceramic Manufacturing Company, and executive director of the Syrian Scholars Association. Further, he is a registered lawyer with the Damascus Bar Association and was involved in various business and commercial ventures.

== Publications ==
Shukri has authored several books and research papers in Arabic, including:

- Testimonial Evidence in Islamic Law and Civil Law (Master's thesis).
- Children’s Rights in Islamic Law and International Legislation (Doctoral dissertation).
- Alimony in Syrian Personal Status Law.
- The Role of Mosques in Islam (manuscript).
- Leadership in Islamic Governance (manuscript).
- Quran Memorization Institutes and Their Development (manuscript).
- Islam and the Sanctity of Human Life (televised seminar).
- Transitional Justice in a Divided Society (conference paper, Istanbul 2013).
