= Rima al-Qadiri =

Ba'athist Syrian politician (born 1963)

- ريما القادري

Minister for Social and Labour Affairs
- In office 20 August 2015 – 30 August 2020
- President: Bashar al-Assad
- Prime Minister: Wael Nader al-Halqi (2015); Imad Khamis (2016–2020)
- Preceded by: Kinda al-Shammat
- Succeeded by: Salwa Abdullah

Personal details
- Born: 1963 (age 62–63) Damascus, Syria
- Party: Ba'ath Party
- Education: Damascus University

Rima al-Qadiri (Arabic: ريما القادري; born 1963) is a Syrian politician who served as Minister for Social and Labour Affairs from 2015 to 2020.

== Early life and education ==
Rima al-Qadiri was born in 1963 in Damascus, Syria. She graduated from Damascus University's French Literature Department in 1986. After graduating, she worked in various private institutions, as well as at the Commercial Bank of Syria and the Ministry of Economy and Foreign Trade. She also joined the Planning and International Cooperation Commission in 2009 as deputy chairman, and was appointed chairperson in 2014.

== Career ==
She was appointed Minister for Social and Labour Affairs on 20 August 2015 by Syrian President Bashar al-Assad, succeeding Kinda al-Shammat, and was officially sworn in on 22 August.

In April 2016, she met Syrian expatriates from São Paulo, Brazil, and discussed ways they could support the Syrian government.

She retained her position upon the establishment of the Imad Khamis government on 3 July 2016.

In April 2017, she attended the summit of women affairs ministers from Muslim-majority countries which was held in Mashhad, Iran. She met Shahindokht Molaverdi, then-Vice President for Women and Family Affairs of Iran, on the sidelines of the summit in Iran.

She visited Belarus in August 2017 and met Belarusian President Alexander Lukashenko on 28 August. They discussed ways of providing education to Syrian children in Belarus. Three days prior, on 25 August, she visited a 10-year-old Syrian patient undergoing tumor surgery at the Belarusian Children's Oncology, Hematology and Immunology.

She was sanctioned by the European Union on 14 November 2016 for being a minister in the Syrian government.

She was succeeded by Salwa Abdullah on 30 August 2020.

== Post-Assad ==
On 4 July 2025, al-Qadiri and Kinda al-Shammat were arrested in Damascus on charges of being involved in the disappearance of hundreds of children. The Syrian Interior Ministry's media office told Enab Baladi on 6 July that they were arrested based on preliminary findings and testimonies provided by the families of detainees and the disappeared, gathered jointly by the Ministries of Interior and Social Affairs. Their arrests came as part of an official investigative committee established to investigate the disappearance of detained children in orphanages during the Assad regime.
