= Ministry of Administrative Development =

Government ministry of Syria

- وزارة التنمية الإدارية

Agency overview
- Formed: 2014
- Jurisdiction: Government of Syria
- Headquarters: Damascus
- Minister responsible: Mohammad Skaf
- Website: moad.gov.sy

The Ministry of Administrative Development (Arabic: وزارة التنمية الإدارية) is a ministry of the Syrian government.

== History ==
The Ministry was established by Legislative Decree No. 39 of 2014.

== Organisation ==
=== Centers ===
- Administrative Support and Measurement Center
- HR Service Center in governorates
- State Leaders Center

=== Central departments ===
- Communication and Executive Support Department
- Quality Control Department
- Institutional organization management
- Human Resource Management
- Reliability and Licensing Department
- Functional Legislation Management
- Management simplification of procedures
- Administrative development directorates in the governorates

== Responsibilies ==
The ministry is responsible for cooperation and coordination with the public and concerned authorities, undertakes the review and study of the laws regulating the public job and proposing its development to ensure the improvement of its performance and the quality of its services.

== List of ministers ==
Minister	Government	Term
Minister for Administrative Development
Hassan al-Nouri	Al-Halqi; Khamis	27 August 2014 – 29 March 2017
Salam Mohammad al-Saffaf	Khamis; Arnous I Arnous II; Al-Jalali	29 March 2017 – 10 December 2024
Fadi al-Qassem	Caretaker	10 December 2024 – 29 March 2025
Mohammad Skaf	Transitional	29 March 2025 – present
