= Kinda al-Shammat =

Ba'athist Syrian politician (born 1973)

- كندة الشماط

Minister for Social and Labour Affairs
- In office 9 February 2013 – 20 August 2015
- President: Bashar al-Assad
- Prime Minister: Wael Nader al-Halqi
- Preceded by: Jassem Mohammad Zakaria
- Succeeded by: Rima al-Qadiri

Personal details
- Born: 1973 (age 52–53) Serghaya, Rif Dimashq, Syria
- Party: Ba'ath Party
- Education: Damascus University

Kinda al-Shammat (Arabic: كندة الشماط; born 1973) is a Syrian politician who served as Minister for Social and Labour Affairs from 2013 to 2015.

== Early life and education ==
Kinda al-Shammat was born in 1973 in Serghaya, Rif Dimashq. She graduated from Damascus University in 2005 with a PhD in private law. After graduating, she worked as a professor of international law in Damascus University and also taught at Syrian Virtual University. She also worked with various organizations, such as the Syrian Commission for Family and Population Affairs, the Women's Union Organization, and the United Nations Development Fund for Women, as a legal expert in regards to family issues and violence against women. Additionally, she has finished some studies in relation to children and women's issues, especially in wars and conflicts.

== Career ==
She was a member of the committee tasked with drafting the 2012 Syrian Constitution.

She was appointed Minister for Social and Labour Affairs on 9 February 2013 by Syrian President Bashar al-Assad, succeeding Jassem Mohammad Zakaria. She retained her position upon the establishment of the Second Wael al-Halqi government in August 2014.

On 23 June 2014, she was sanctioned by the European Union for being a minister in the Assad regime.

She was dismissed by Bashar al-Assad on 20 August 2015, and was succeeded by Rima al-Qadiri.

== Post-Assad ==
On 4 July 2025, al-Shammat and Rima al-Qadiri were arrested in Damascus on charges of being involved in the disappearance of hundreds of children. The Syrian Interior Ministry's media office told Enab Baladi on 6 July that they were arrested based on preliminary findings and testimonies provided by the families of detainees and the disappeared, gathered jointly by the Ministries of Interior and Social Affairs. Their arrests came as part of an official investigative committee established to investigate the disappearance of detained children in orphanages during the Assad regime.
