= Maloul al-Hussein =

Syrian politician

Maloul al-Hussein is a Syrian politician from the Unified Communist Party who served as Minister of State for People's Assembly Affairs in the First Hussein Arnous government.
