= Tourism in Syria =

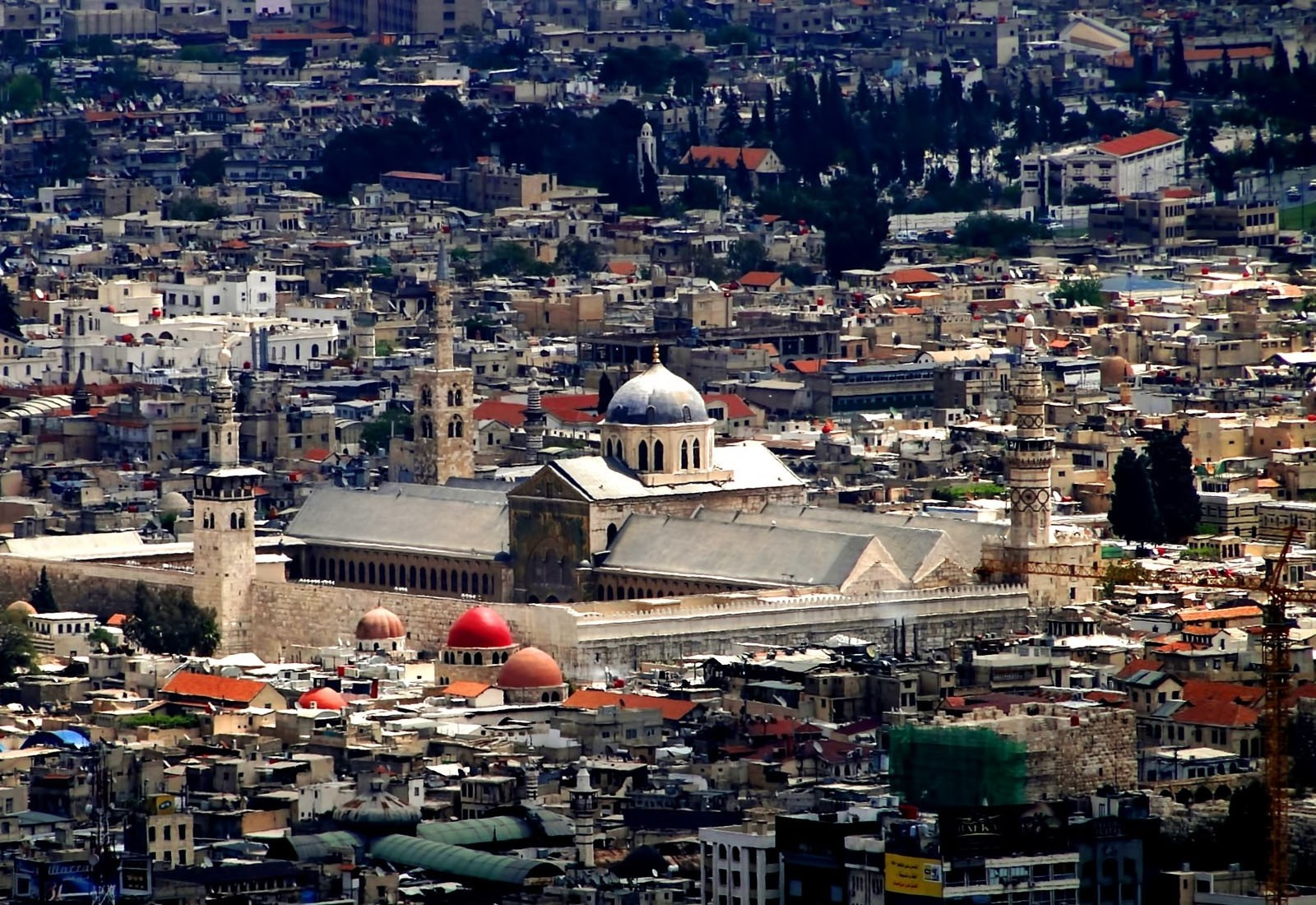
The Umayyad Mosque, also known as the Great Mosque of Damascus, in the old city

Although Syria has some of the oldest cities in Western Asia, such as Damascus and Aleppo (a UNESCO World Heritage Site), tourism in Syria was greatly reduced by the 2011-2024 Syrian War, and its associated refugee crisis. Tourism was further impacted by the COVID-19 pandemic in Syria starting in March 2020. The international economic sanctions imposed on Syria and the sharp drop in the value of the Syrian pound also adversely impact tourism in Syria. The Ministry of Tourism is the responsible government department.

Number of foreign tourist arrivals in Syria

Before the start of the Syrian Civil War, 8.5 million tourists visited Syria in 2010, who brought in tourist revenue estimated at LS 30.8 billion (US$8.4 billion, at 2010 rates), and accounted for 14% of the country's economy. By 2015, the number of tourists had declined by more than 98%, to 170,000.

Many tourist attractions were damaged or destroyed by shelling, flights by all major airlines were suspended, and many major tourist hotels closed. However tourist numbers increased a lot in 2025. In 2026 the minister estimated that 100 billion USD investment is needed to revive Syria's tourism industry.

== Overview ==
=== Before the 2011 crisis ===
Non-Arab visitors to Syria reached 1.1 million in 2002, which includes all visitors to the country, not just tourists. The total number of Arab visitors in 2002 was 3.2 million, most from Lebanon, Jordan, Saudi Arabia, and Iraq. Many Iraqi businesspeople set up ventures in Syrian ports to run import operations for Iraq, causing an increased number of Iraqis visiting Syria in 2003–4. Tourism is a potentially large foreign exchange earner and a source of economic growth. Tourism generated more than 6% of Syria's gross domestic product in 2000, and more reforms were discussed to increase tourism revenues. As a result of projects derived from Investment Law No. 10 of 1991, hotel bed numbers had increased 51% by 1999 and increased further in 2001. A plan was announced in 2002 to develop ecological tourism with visits to desert and nature preserves. Two luxury hotels opened in Damascus at the end of 2004.

Tourism had been increasing considerably before the Civil War, that began in March 2011. According to the Syrian Ministry of Tourism in January 2011, about 6 million foreign tourists visited Syria in 2009, increasing to 8.5 million in 2010, a 40% increase. Tourism revenue was LS 30.8 billion (US$8.4 billion) in 2010, 14% of the country's economy. Tourism industry revenue in 2010 was US$6.5 billion, accounting for 12% of the gross domestic product and 11% of employment.

=== After 2011 ===
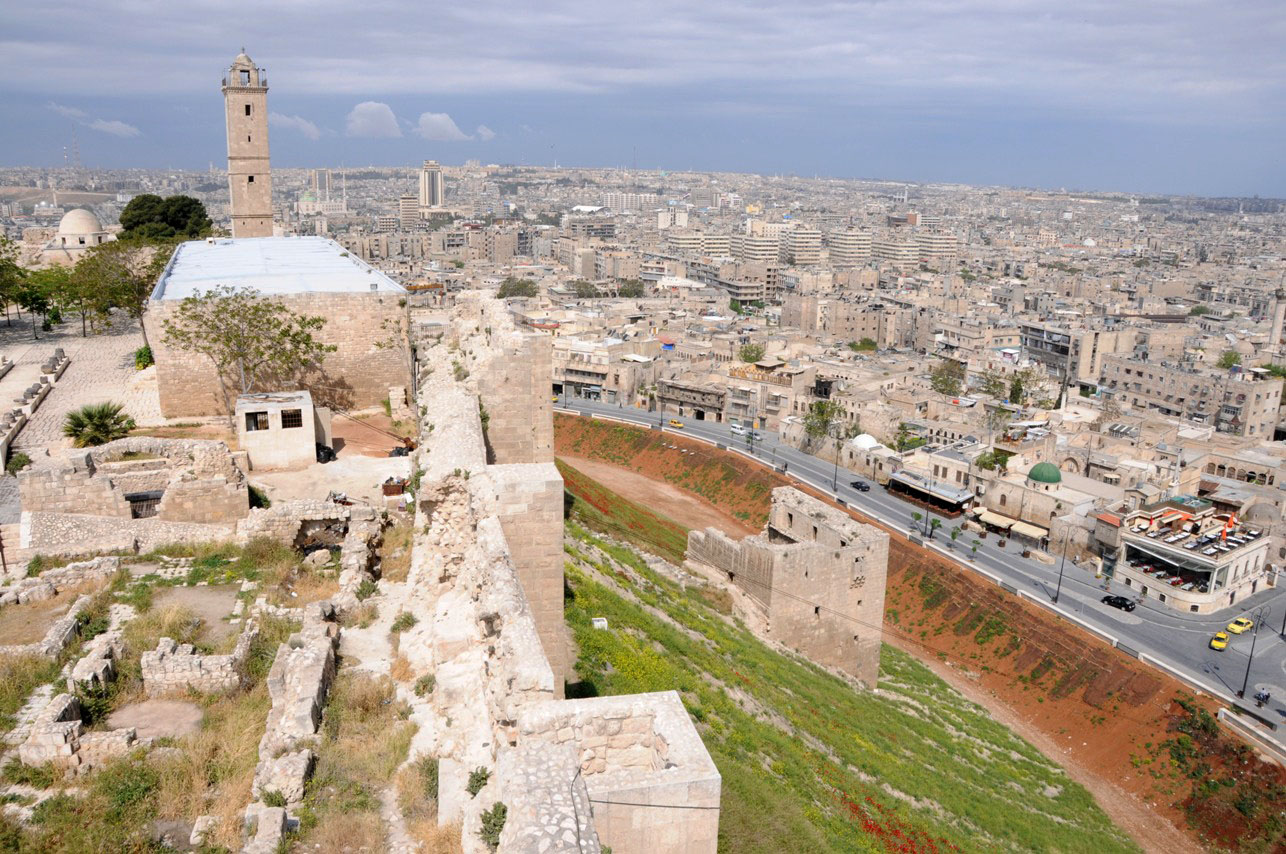
Old and new Aleppo

Since the start of the Syrian Civil War, in March 2011, tourism has declined steeply. According to official reports, hotel rooms designed for foreign tourists have been occupied by refugees. In the first quarter of 2012, tourism revenue was about LS 12.8 billion (US$178 million), compared with LS 52 billion (US$1 billion) in the first quarter of 2011, and the number of foreign tourists decreased by more than 76% in the 2012 quarter. Employment in the tourism industry was down by "nearly two-thirds" in that period. According to UNESCO, five of Syria's six World Heritage Sites have been affected by the civil war. In 2012, Syria sent a letter to the United Nations describing the decline of its tourism industry, noting that the country's hotel-occupancy rate had fallen from 90% the previous year to 15%.

As of 2013, overall Syrian tourism revenue had declined by 94%, with Aleppo the worst affected, and the Tourism Minister stated, at the end of September 2013, that 289 tourist destinations had been damaged since 2011.

By 2015, the number of tourists had declined by more than 98%. The Ministry of Tourism claimed that 45,000 tourists visited the country in the first half of 2015, but these figures were disputed by observers, according to the Syrian Economic Forum, which stated that Iranian religious tourism was all that remained. According to a 2015 article in The Telegraph, hotels by beaches in the Mediterranean coast in Tartus and Latakia still received internal tourists and one hotel was "full" in the summer of 2014 and 2015.

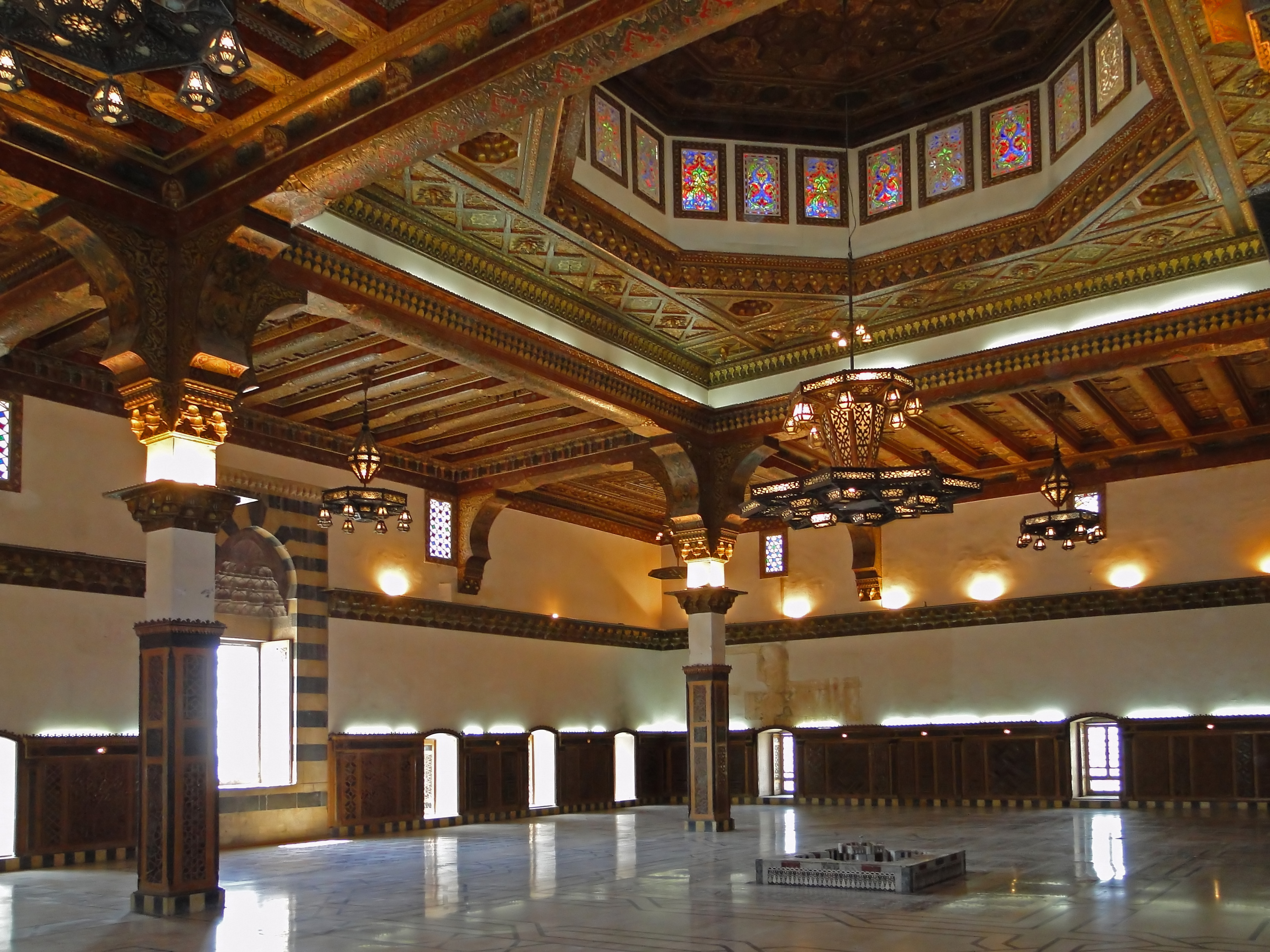
Interior to the Citadel of Aleppo

=== Reconstruction ===
As the Syrian Arab Army recaptured territory in the southern and western parts of the country, these areas came back under central Syrian government control. Major tourist sites damaged and made inaccessible due to the conflict began to be reconstructed and restored. Teams at damaged UNESCO World Heritage sites such as the Old City of Aleppo, the ruins of Palmyra and Krak des Chevaliers have begun restoration and reconstruction following years of conflict and devastation.

=== Promotion ===
Promotion of tourism in Syria is handled by the Syrian Ministry of Tourism, which also maintains an active Facebook page as well as the official Syria tourism website. In September 2016, Syria's Ministry of Tourism drew criticism from some quarters for releasing a video, "Syria Always Beautiful" encouraging tourists to visit its beaches. The video spotlighted regions such as Tartus, which remain somewhat peaceful, though Tartus saw an attack resulting in the deaths of over 150 in May 2016.

== Attractions ==
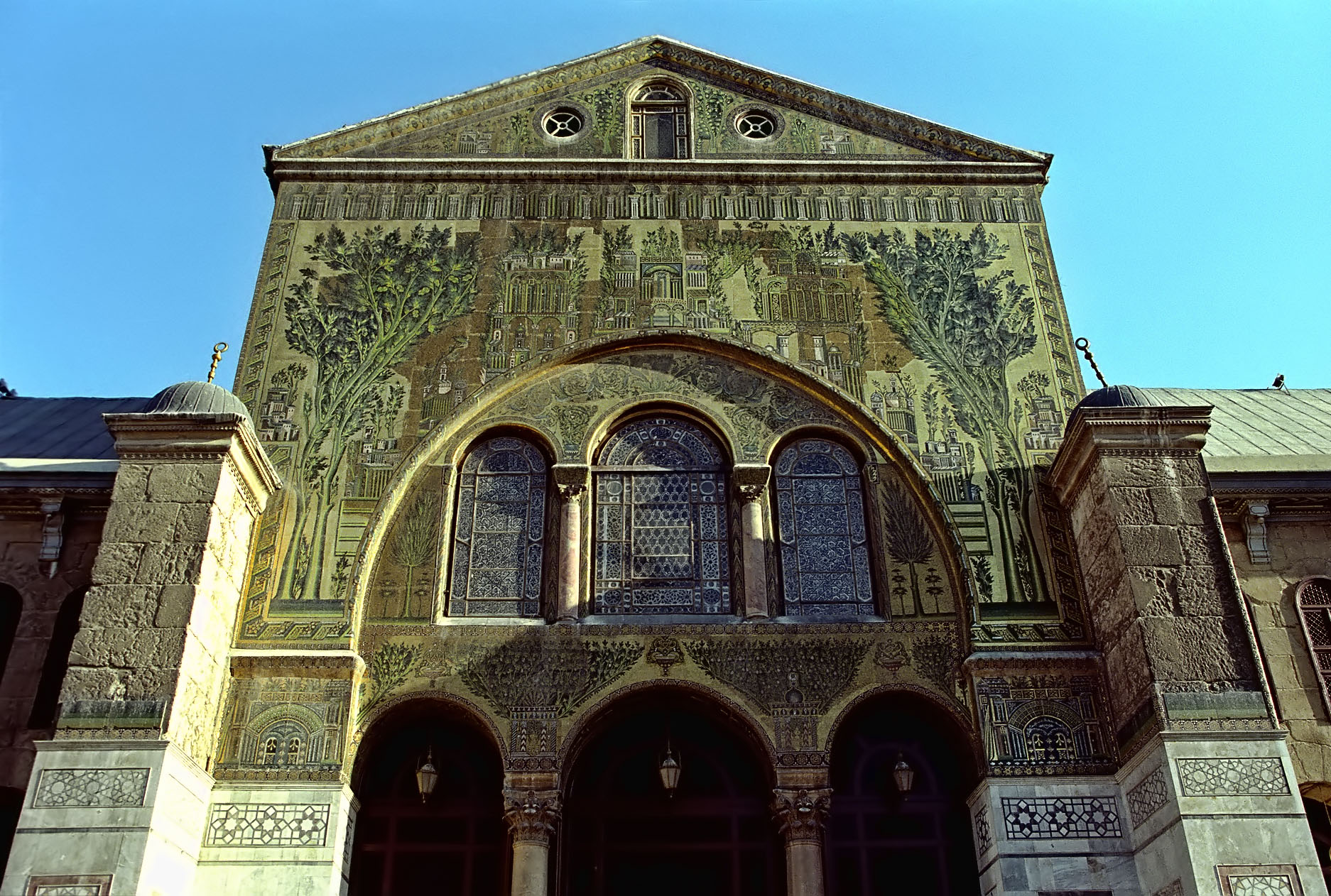
Facade of the Great Mosque of Damascus

=== UNESCO sites ===
There are the six UNESCO World Heritage Sites in the country. Twelve other sites submitted to UNESCO are on the organisation's tentative list: Norias of Hama, Ugrarit (Tell Shamra), Ebla (Tell Mardikh), Apamée (Afamia), Qasr al-Hayr al-Sharqi, Maaloula, Tartus, Arwad and two sites in the Euphrates valley: Mari (Tell Hariri) and Dura-Europos.

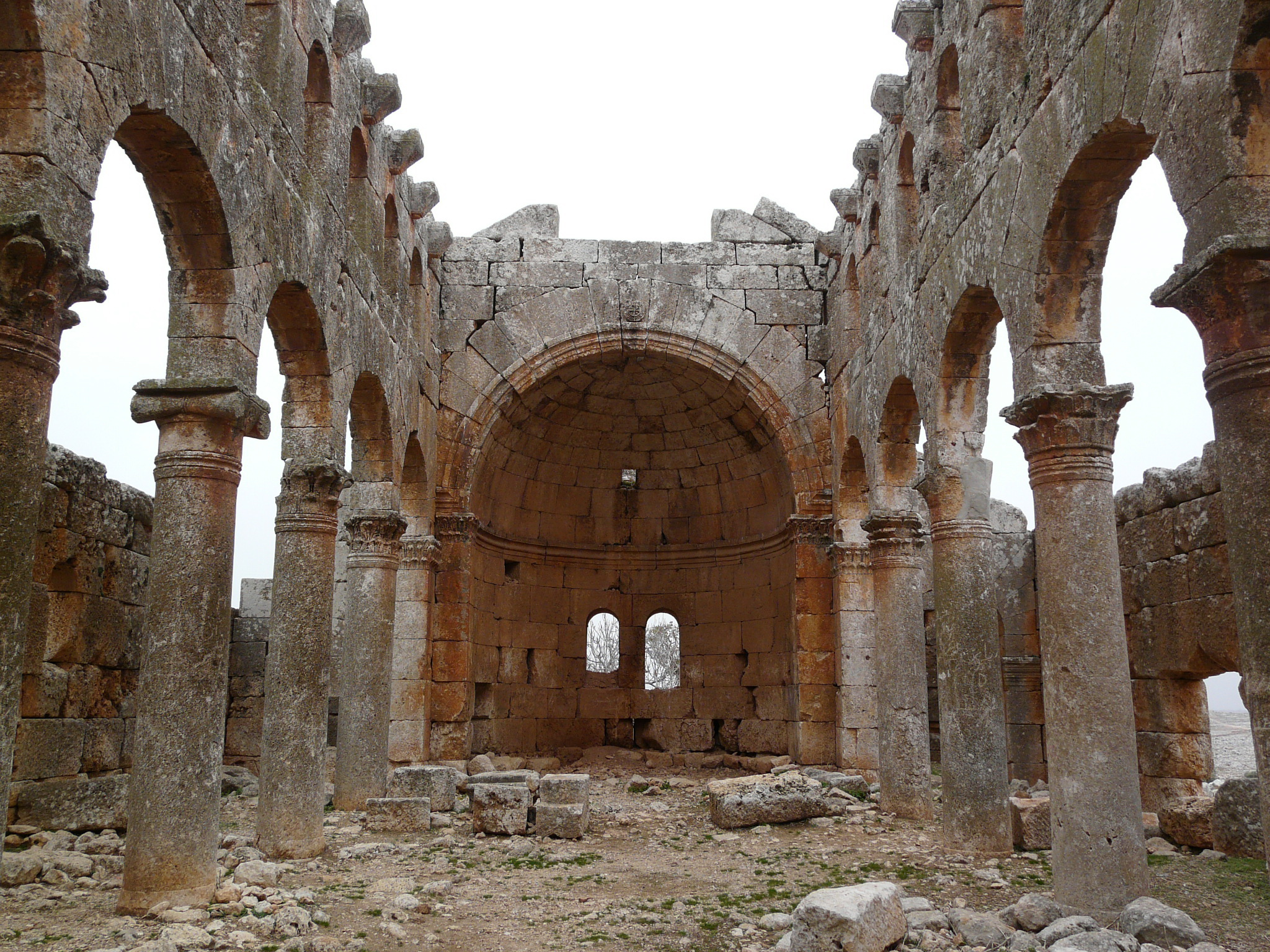
The Mushabbak Basilica in Aleppo

- Ancient City of Aleppo: The Ancient City of Aleppo is the historic city centre of Aleppo, Syria. The Old City of Aleppo, which is composed of the ancient city within the walls and the old cell-like quarters outside the walls approximately holds an area of 350 hectares (860 acres; 3.5 km^{2}), housing about 120,000 residents. Famous for its large mansions, narrow alleys, covered souqs and ancient caravanserais, the Ancient City of Aleppo became a UNESCO World Heritage Site in 1986.

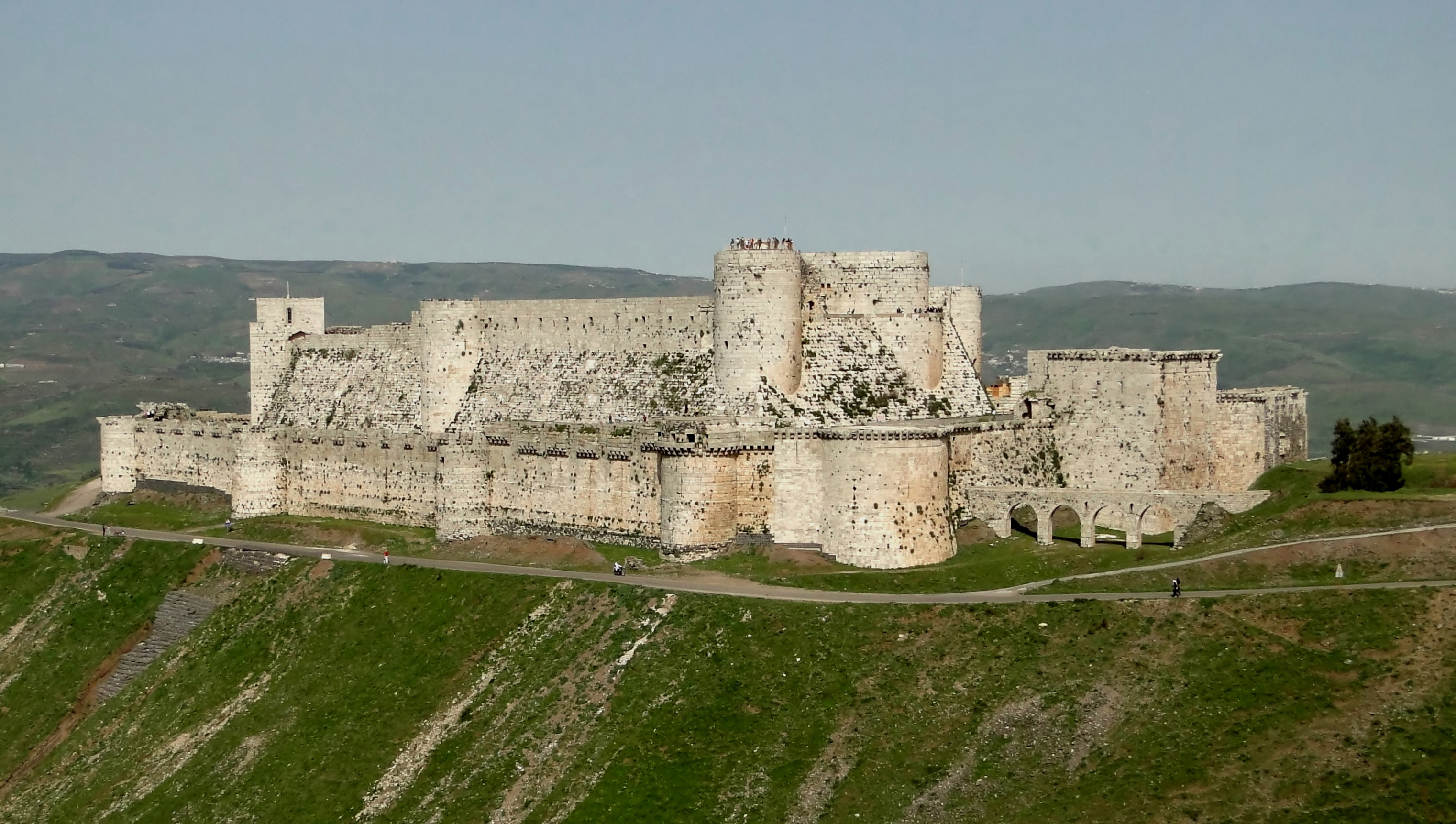
The Krak des Chevaliers

- Bosra: The Ancient city of Bosra is an ancient Roman city. Famed for its Roman theatre, possibly the best preserved in the world, the city also holds many remains of the ancient city such as baths, colonnades and remains of ancient houses and temples.
- Ancient City of Damascus: The Ancient City of Damascus is the historic city centre of Damascus, Syria. Damascus is the capital and one of the largest cities in Syria. It is commonly known in Syria as ash-Sham (Arabic: الشام, romanized: ash-Shām) and nicknamed as the City of Jasmine (Arabic: مدينة الياسمين, romanized: Madīnat al-Yāsmīn). In addition to being one of the oldest continuously inhabited cities in the world, Damascus is a major cultural and religious centre of the Levant. It's famed for its ancient souks, old city, old Damascene houses and its Umayyad era Mosque, the city also has many remains from the Roman period, such as the Temple of Jupiter, and houses many of the oldest churches in the world, most notably the Chapel of Saint Paul.
- The Dead Cities of northern Syria: The dead cities are a group of 700 abandoned villages in northwest Syria between Aleppo and Idlib. Most villages which date from the 1st to 7th centuries, became abandoned between the 8th and 10th centuries. The settlements feature the well-preserved architectural remains of temples, cisterns, bathhouses and many ancient churches from early Christianity. Important dead cities include the Church of Saint Simeon Stylites, Serjilla and al Bara.
- Krak des Chevaliers and Qal’at Salah El-Din: The Krak de Chevaliers is a Crusader era fortress dating back to the 10th century, and is one of the most important preserved medieval castles in the world. The site was first inhabited in the 11th century by a settlement of Kurdish troops garrisoned there by the Mirdasids; as a result it was known as Hisn al-Akrad, meaning the "Castle of the Kurds". In 1142 it was given by Raymond II, Count of Tripoli, to the Knights Hospitaller. It remained in their possession until it fell in 1271. Together with Qal'at Salah El-Din (Citadel of Saladin), the Krak des Chevaliers is one of the best examples for Crusader era architecture.
- Palmyra: The ancient 2000 BC later Roman colonia of Palmyra is an oasis city in the Syrian desert. The ancient Palmyrenes were renowned merchants who got enormous wealth not only by trading by rare commodities from the east, but also by taking advantage of the city's position as an Oasis, bringing enormous wealth to their city. The Palmyrenes used this wealth to build great monuments, such as the Temple of Bel and the Arch of Triumph, and also to design Greco-Roman and Persian influenced Bas-reliefs of their deceased, many of which are nowadays housed in many of the biggest international museums, which show the craftsmanship of the Palmyrenes and their dedication to their religious rituals. During the Syrian Civil War in 2015, the Islamic State of Iraq and the Levant (ISIL) destroyed large parts of the ancient city, which was recaptured by the Syrian Army on 2 March 2017.

=== War tourism ===
The Syrian conflict reportedly attracted adventure-seekers. According to retired Israel Defense Forces colonel Kobi Marom, who leads tours of the war zone across the Israeli border, tourists were interested in seeing the conflict and went "crazy" when they learnt that they were probably being observed by Al-Qaeda militants.

== Gallery ==
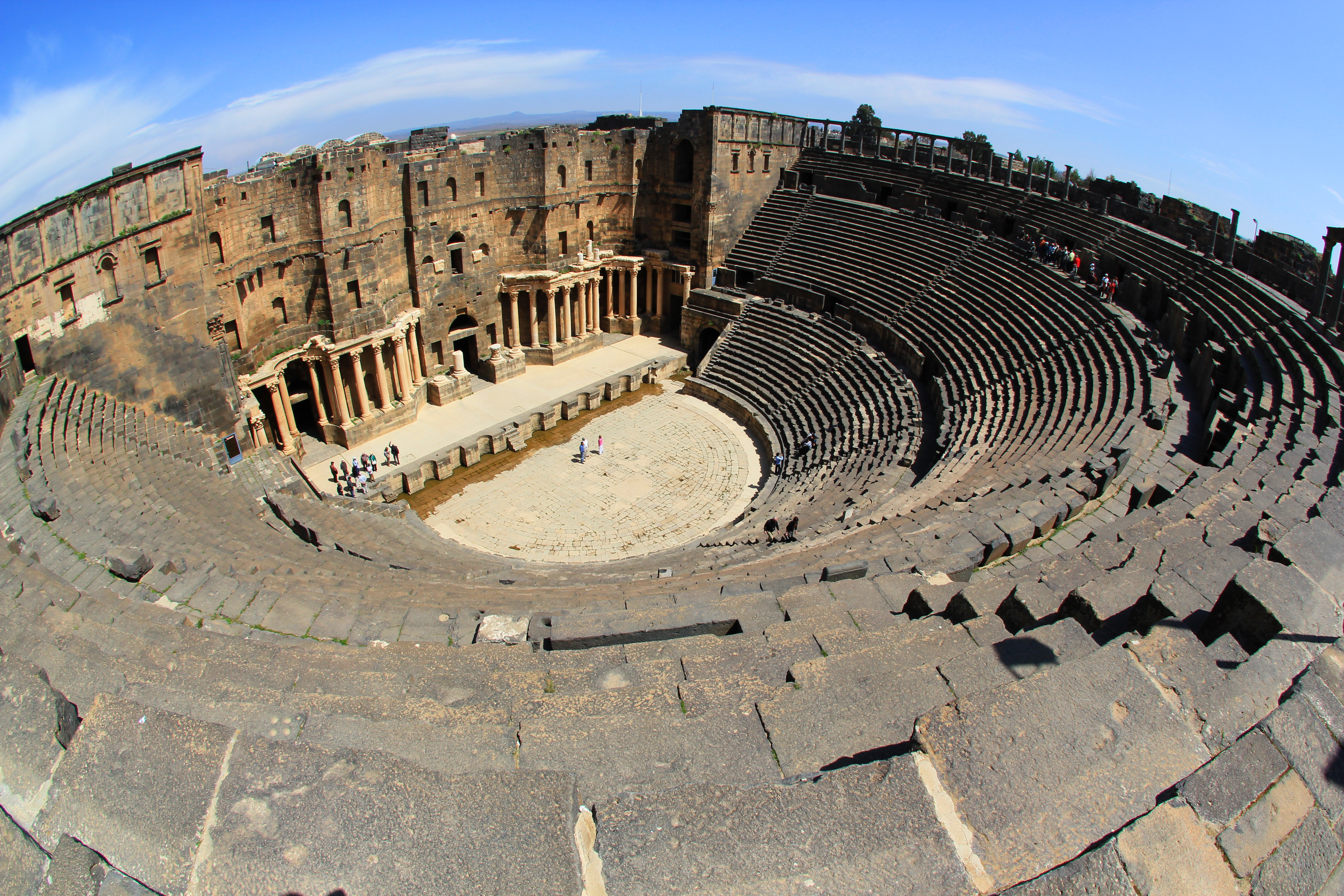
Roman theatre of Bosra

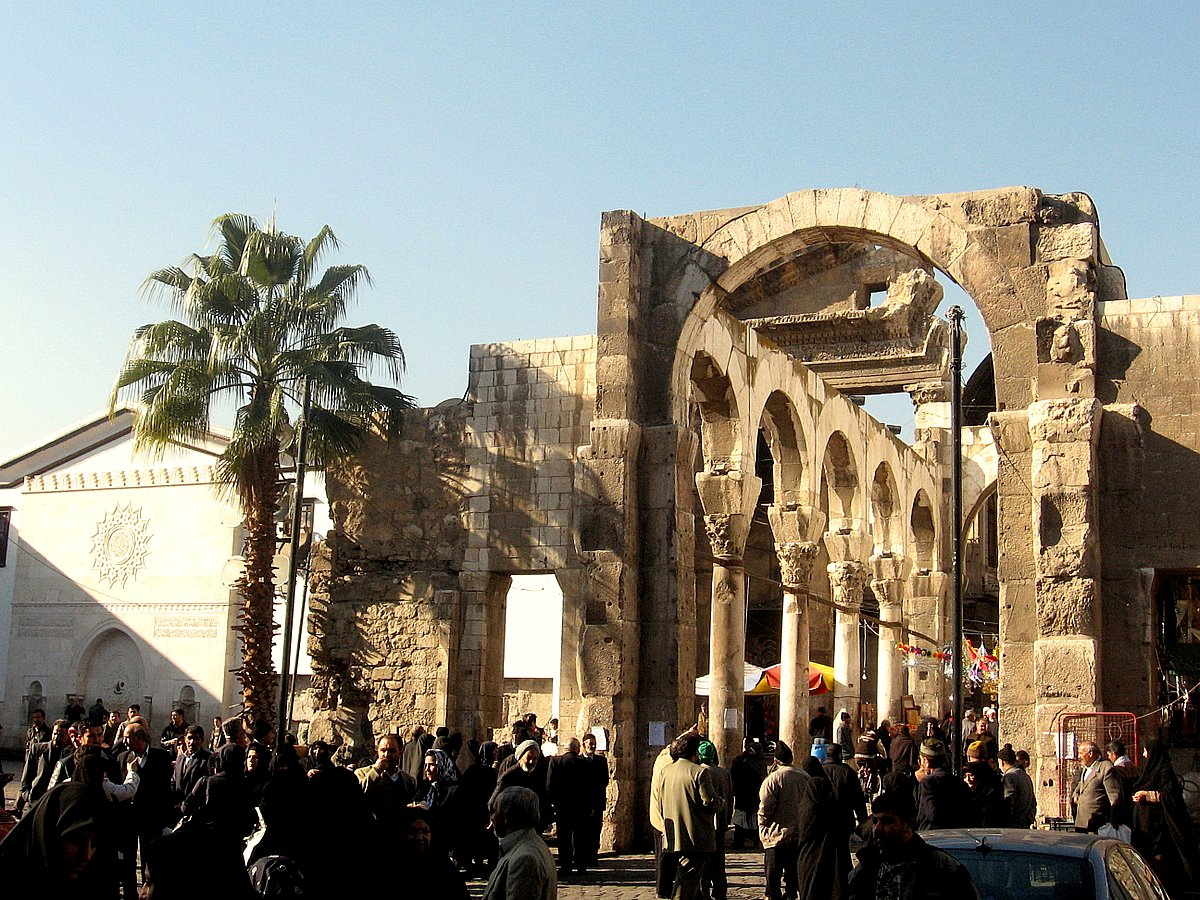
Temple of Jupiter, Damascus

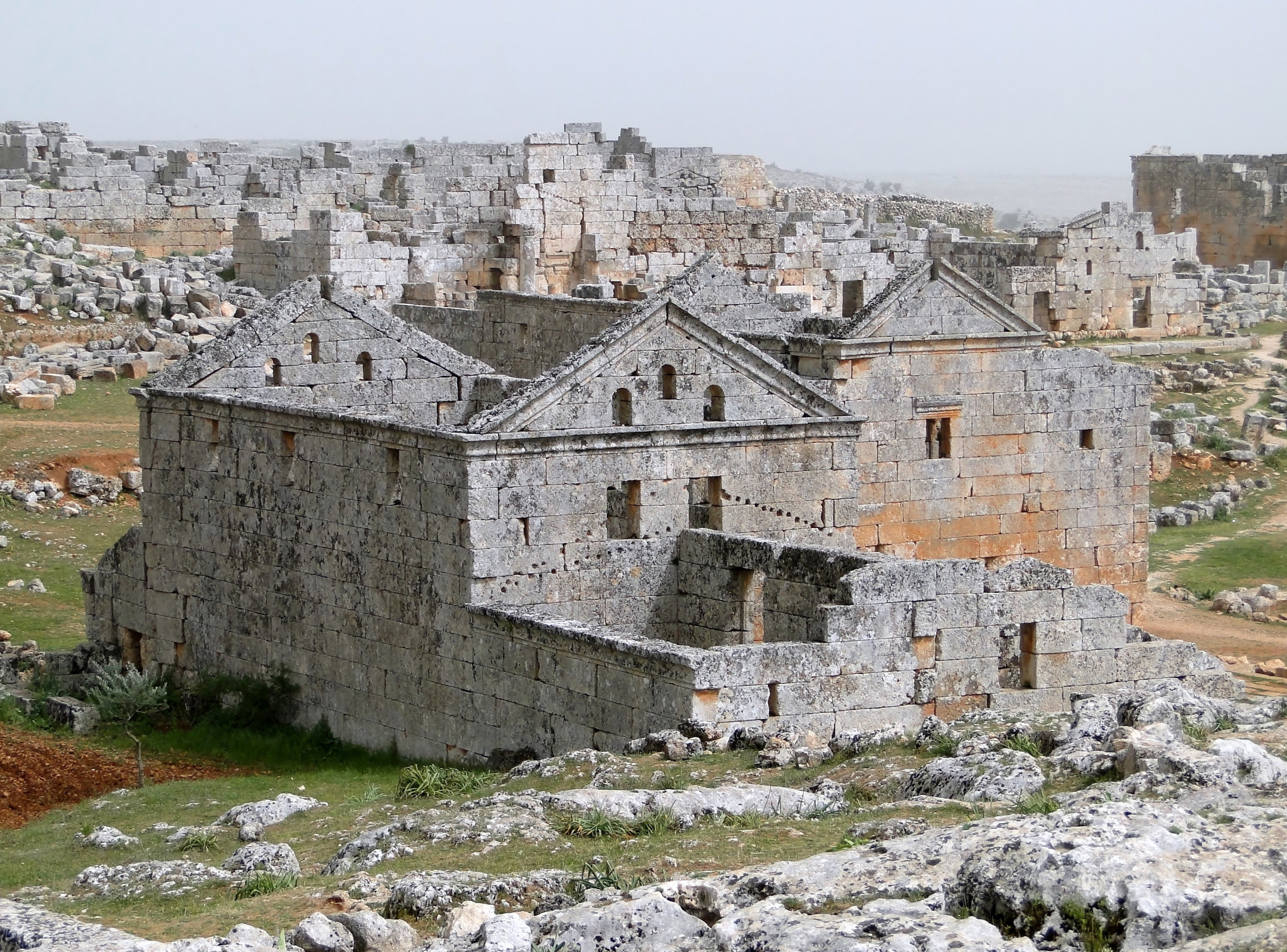
One of the Dead Cities

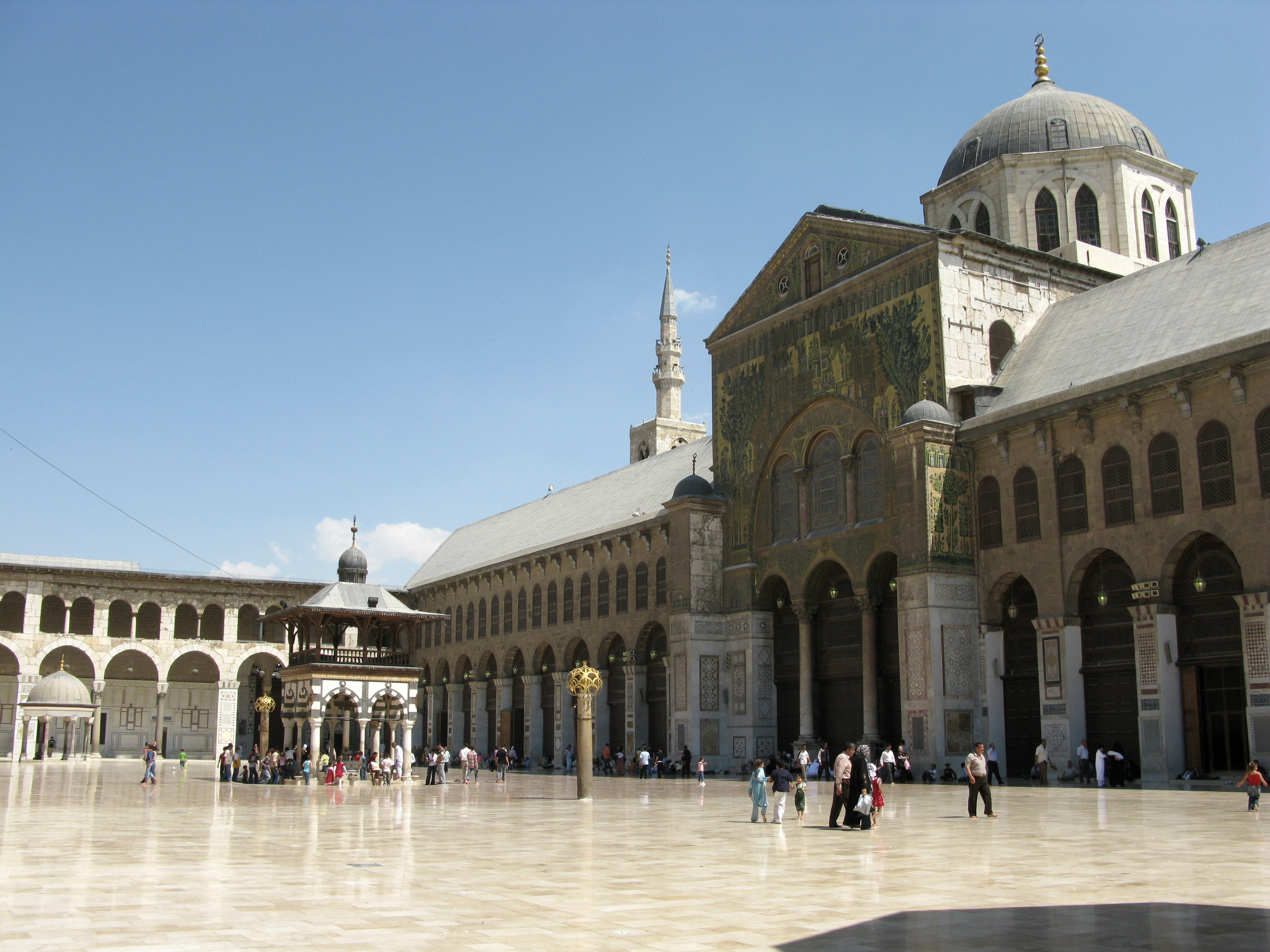
The Great Mosque of Damascus from the Umayyad era

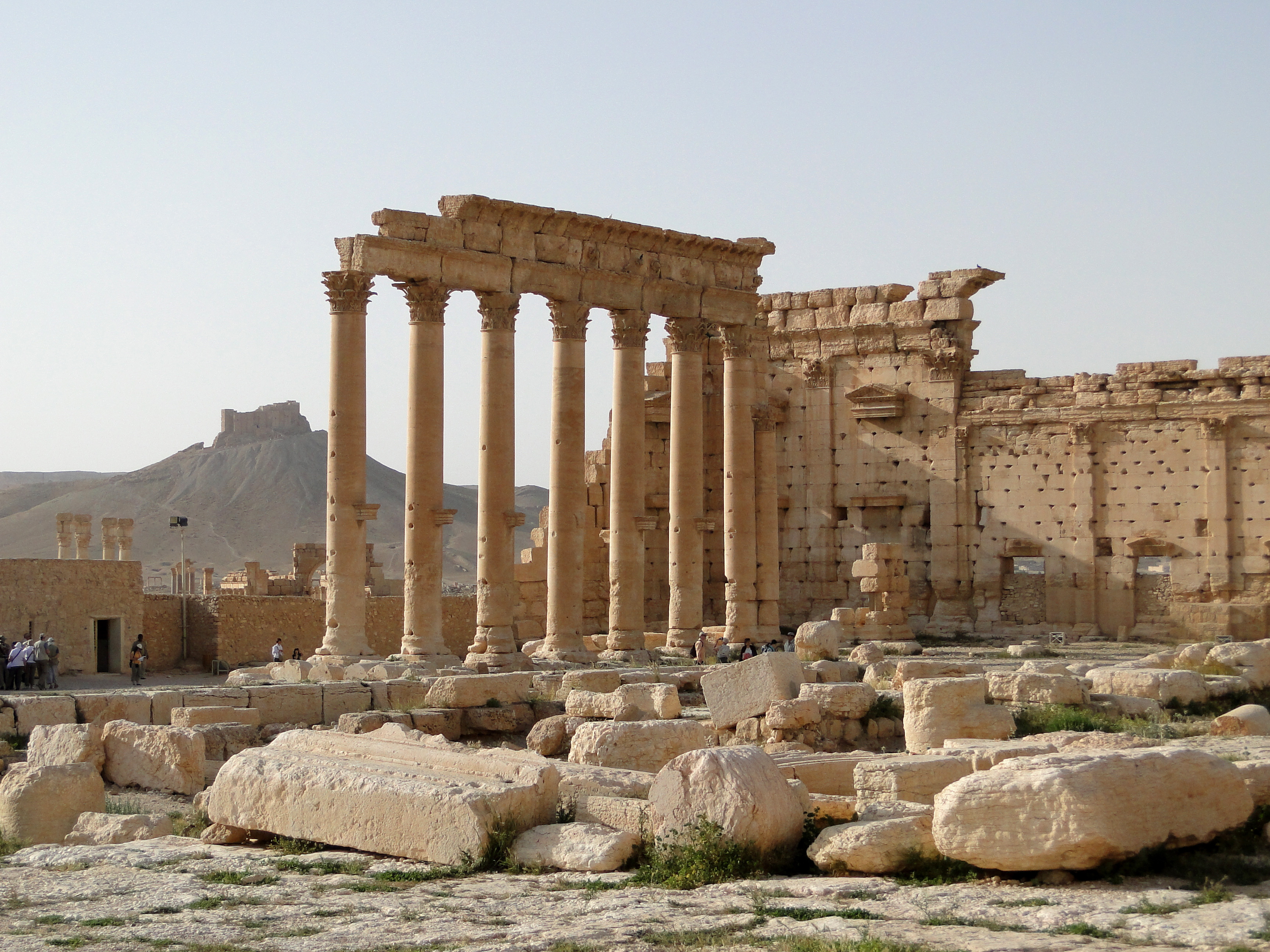
Temple of Bel in Palmyra

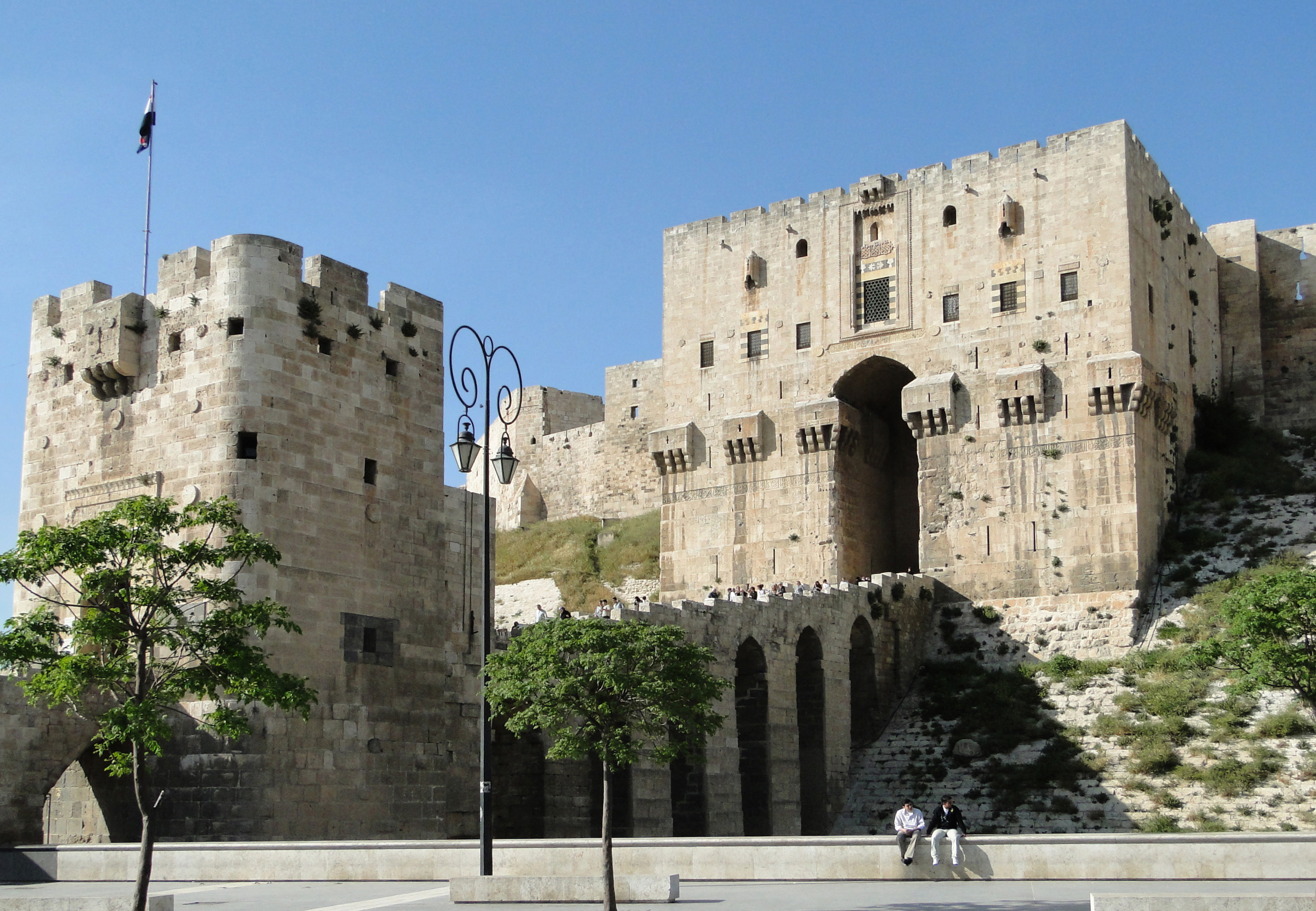
The Citadel of Aleppo

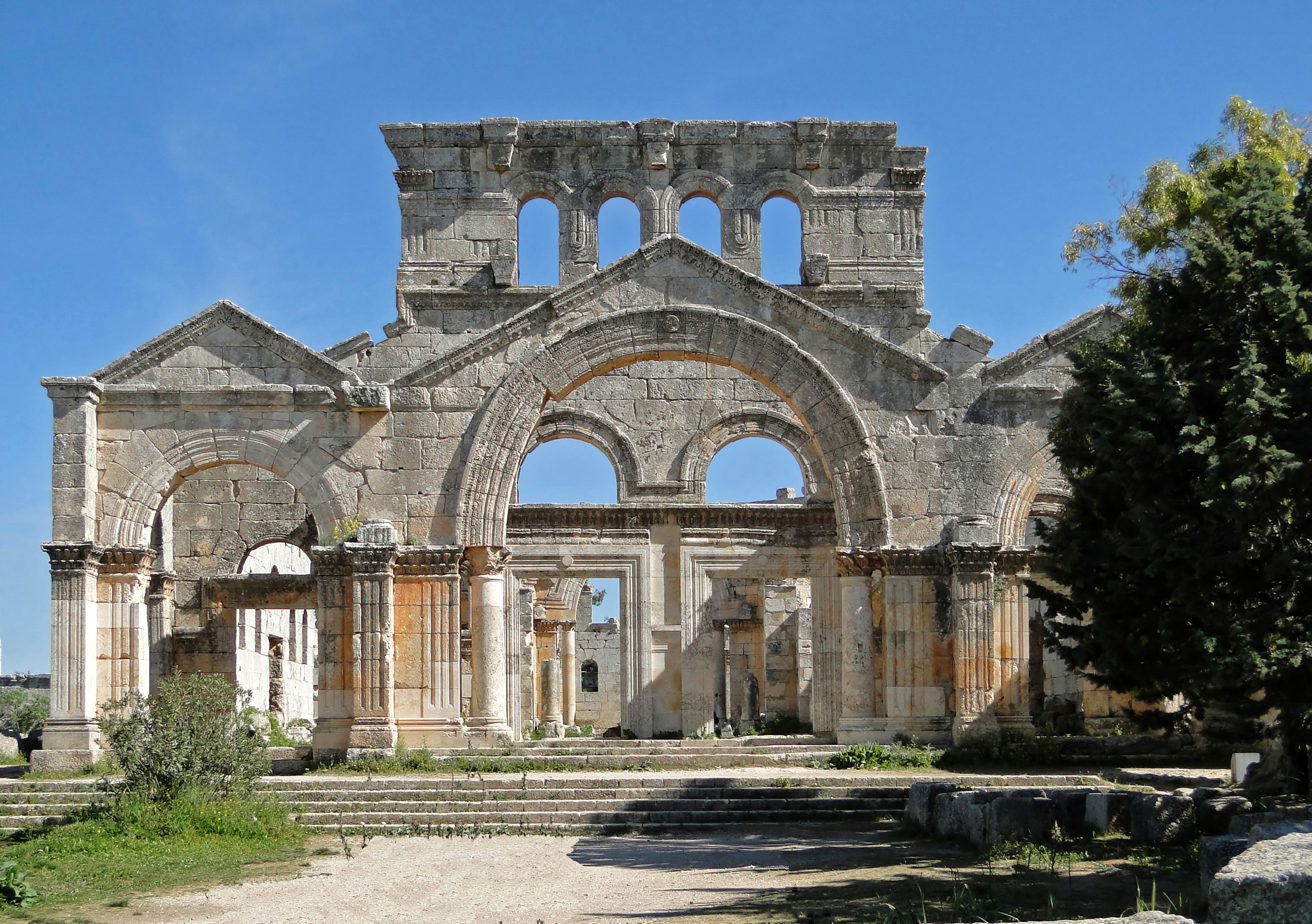
The Church of Saint Simeon Stylites, one of the oldest surviving Byzantine churches

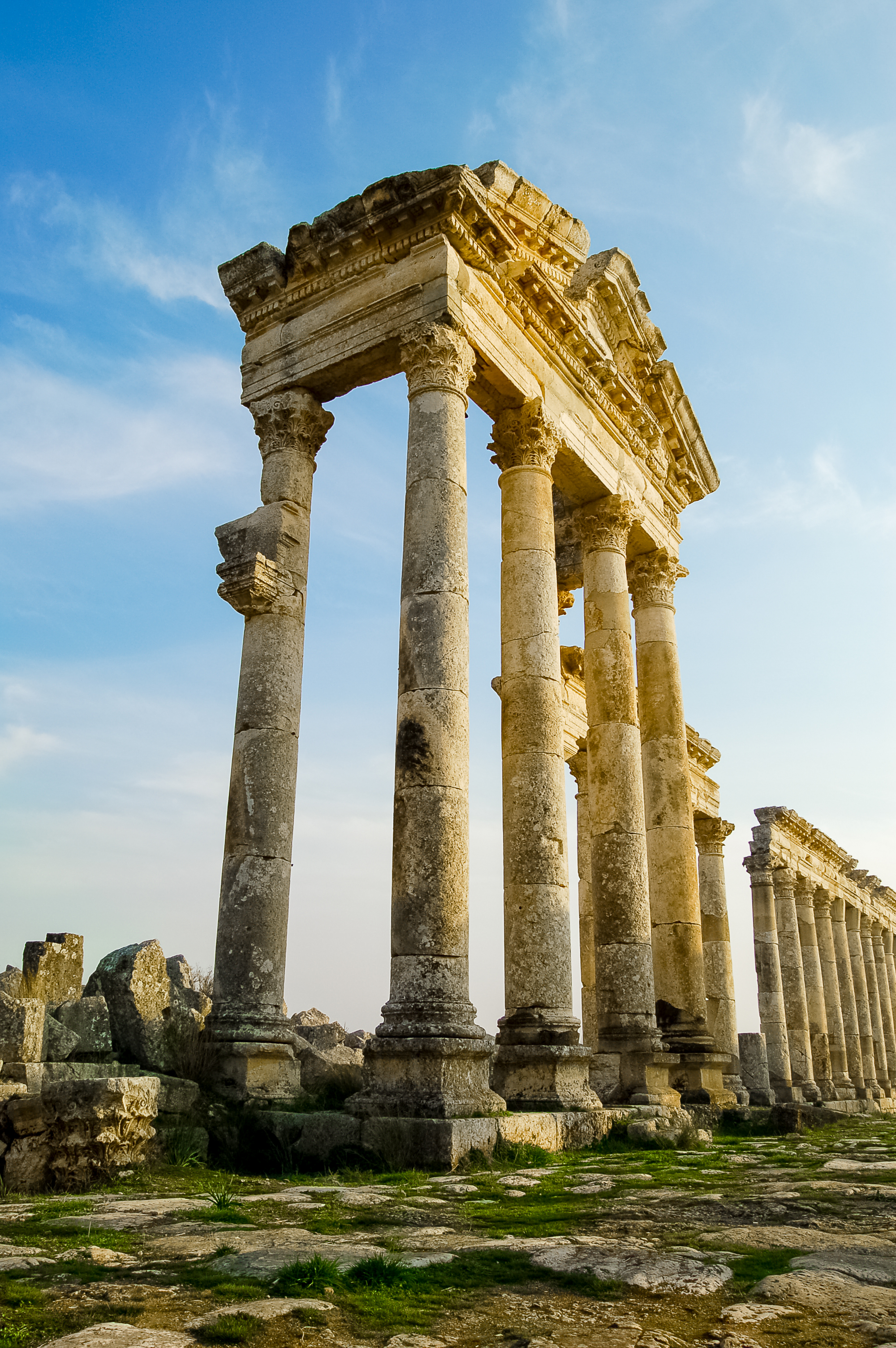
Apamea
