= Mohammad Skaf =

Syrian politician

- محمد سكاف

Minister of Administrative Development
- Incumbent
- Assumed office 29 March 2025
- President: Ahmed al-Sharaa
- Preceded by: Fadi al-Qassem

Personal details
- Born: 1990 (age 35–36)

Mohammad Hassan Skaf (Arabic: محمد حسان سكاف; born 1990) is the minister of administrative development in the Syrian transitional government since 29 March 2025.
