= Talal Al-Barazi =

Syrian politician

Talal al-Barazi (Arabic: طلال البرازي, born 1963) is a Syrian businessman and politician. He was Internal Trade and Consumer Protection Minister from 11 May 2020 to 31 July 2021 in the Imad Khamis government and First Hussein Arnous government.
