= Basel al-Suweydan =

Syrian politician (born 1984)

- باسل السويدان

Minister of Agriculture
- Incumbent
- Assumed office 9 May 2026
- President: Ahmed al-Sharaa
- Preceded by: Amjad Badr

Personal details
- Born: 1984 (age 41–42) Halfaya, Hama, Syria
- Education: Damascus University
- Nickname: Abu Hamza Qasioun (Note: Arabic: أبو حمزة قاسيون)

Basel Hafez al-Suweydan (Note: Arabic: باسل حافظ السويدان, also transliterated as Basel al-Suwaidan) is a Syrian engineer who is currently serving as the current Minister of Agriculture since 9 May 2026.

== Education ==
Al-Suweydan holds a Bachelor's degree in Agricultural Engineering from Damascus University, and is pursuing a Master's degree in Rural Engineering (currently under discussion) from Idlib University.

== Career ==
Al-Suweydan had Served as Deputy Minister of Agriculture and Assistant Minister for Administrative and Financial Affairs. He also served as Director of the Agriculture and Livestock Sector at the Sovereign Wealth Fund, he also, and General Manager of the agricultural investment companies "Iktifaa", "Al-Khadraa", and "Ghiras".

He had also served as General Manager of the Monetary and Consumer Protection Authority in Idlib, and headed the Committee for Combating Illicit Enrichment and was a member of the Import and Export Committee.

== See also ==
- Cabinet of Syria
