= Ministry of Social Affairs and Labor (Syria) =

Government ministry of Syria

- وزارة الشؤون الاجتماعية والعمل

Agency overview
- Formed: 1943, renewed 2016
- Jurisdiction: Government of Syria
- Headquarters: Damascus
- Minister responsible: Hind Kabawat
- Website: mosal.gov.sy

The Ministry of Social Affairs and Labor (Arabic: وزارة الشؤون الاجتماعية والعمل, romanized: Wizārat al-Shuʾūn al-Ijtimāʿīyah wa-al-ʿAmal) is the main authority administrating labor affairs and social matters, including labour inspection, and a department of the Government of Syria.

== Responsibility ==
The ministry is responsible for labor and employment, occupational health and safety, employment in the public sector, family empowerment, poverty reduction and livelihood support, development of the social protection system and social security system, and the provision of social protection and care for the most vulnerable or vulnerable social groups.

== Organization ==
The Directorates of the Ministry:

- Directorate of Associations and Private Institutions
- Social Protection Directorate
- Rural Development Directorate
- Directorate of Labor Inspection, Health and Safety
- Labor Relations Directorate
- Manpower Directorate
- Directorate of Labor Market Observatory
- Directorate of Technology and Information Systems
- Directorate of Technical and Engineering Affairs
- Legal Affairs Directorate
- Directorate of Administrative Affairs
- Directorate of Planning and International Cooperation
- Directorate of Administrative Development
- Directorate of Internal Control

=== Regional organization ===
They have decentralized in its main structure and is represented in the 14 regional departments by a regional Directorate of Social Affairs, which has social, employment and inspection functions.

== Ministers ==
Minister	Government	Term
Minister of Social and Labour Affairs
Kinda al-Shammat	Al-Halqi I Al-Halqi II	2013 to 2015
Rima al-Qadiri	Al-Halqi II; Khamis	2015 to 2020
Salwa Abdullah	Arnous I	2020 to 2021
Mohamed Seif El-Din	Arnous II	2021 to 2023
Louai Imad al-Munajjid	Arnous II	2023 to 2024
Samar al-Sebai	Al-Jalali	2024 to 2024
Vacant	Caretaker	2024 to 2025
Minister of Social Affairs and Labor
Hind Kabawat	Transitional	2025 to present
