= Mazen al-Salhani =

Syrian politician

- مازن الصالحاني

Minister of Tourism
- Incumbent
- Assumed office 29 March 2025
- President: Ahmed al-Sharaa
- Preceded by: Mohammad Rami Radwan Martini (Note: Vacant from 10 December 2024 until 29 March 2025.)

Personal details
- Born: 1979 (age 46–47) Damascus, Syria

Mazen al-Salhani (Note: Arabic: مازن الصالحاني) (born 1979) is a Syrian businessman and politician who has served as Minister of Tourism since 29 March 2025.

== Life and early career ==
Born in Damascus in 1979, al-Salhani holds a postgraduate diploma in business administration from the Great Lakes College of Science and Technology in Ontario, Canada. He had chaired the boards of several companies and managed or helped establish many tourism and commercial projects in Qatar, Saudi Arabia, Turkey, Algeria, and Syria. His work included the Salwa Resort, Mall of Qatar, Bentley Hotel, and hotels from global brands such as Hilton, Marriott, and Sheraton.

== Ministeral position ==
Al-Salhani was appointed minister of tourism on 29 March 2025 as part of the transitional government formed after the fall of the Assad regime.

In his first remarks after assuming office, al-Salhani said the ministry's vision was to transform Syria into a global tourism destination.
