= Amjad Badr =

Syrian politician (born 1969)

- أمجد بدر

Minister of Agriculture
- In office 29 March 2025 – 9 May 2026
- President: Ahmed al-Sharaa
- Preceded by: Mohammed Taha al-Ahmed
- Succeeded by: Basel al-Suweydan

Personal details
- Born: 1969 (age 56–57) Suwayda Governorate, Syria
- Party: Independent
- Education: Damascus University (BS); University of Aleppo (PhD)

Amjad Badr (Arabic: أمجد بدر; born 1969) is a Syrian academic and agricultural economist who served as the Minister of Agriculture in the Syrian transitional government between March 2025 and May 2026.

== Early life and education ==
Badr was born in 1969 to a Druze family in Suwayda Governorate. He earned a degree in agricultural engineering from Damascus University in 1993, with a focus on agricultural economics. He later obtained both his master's and doctoral degrees in agricultural economics from the University of Aleppo. During his studies, he conducted research on modern irrigation techniques and their effects on wheat productivity in Syria.

== Academic and professional career ==
Badr has held various research positions at the General Commission for Scientific Agricultural Research, particularly at the Suwayda Research Center. He has participated in several socio-economic studies related to the agricultural sector and collaborated with the International Center for Agricultural Research in the Dry Areas (ICARDA) on multiple development projects.

He has published peer-reviewed research on wheat productivity, the efficiency of irrigation technologies, and the economic returns of agricultural systems. Badr has also presented papers at international conferences focusing on water resource management and sustainable agriculture.

== Ministerial role ==
Following the formation of the Syrian transitional government in March 2025, Badr was appointed as Minister of Agriculture and Agrarian Reform. In his inaugural remarks, he emphasized the importance of sustainably utilizing Syria’s environmental diversity to enhance national food security. He aims to implement wide-ranging agricultural reforms to increase productivity and promote responsible use of natural resources.
