= Mohammad Samir Haddad =

Syrian politician

Mohammad Samir Haddad is a Syrian politician from the Arab Democratic Union Party who served as Minister of State for Southern Development Affairs in the First Hussein Arnous government.
