= Ahmed Al-Qadri =

Syrian engineer and politician (1956–2020)

- أحمد القادري

Minister of Agriculture and Agrarian Reform
- In office 9 February 2013 – 30 August 2020
- President: Bashar al-Assad
- Prime Minister: Wael Nader al-Halqi; Imad Khamis
- Preceded by: Subhi Ahmed Abdullah
- Succeeded by: Mohammed Hassan Qatana

Personal details
- Born: 1956 Al-Hasakah Governorate, Syria
- Died: 3 September 2020 (aged 63–64) Damascus, Syria
- Party: Ba'ath Party
- Profession: Agricultural engineer

Ahmed Al-Qadri (Arabic: أحمد القادري; 1956 – 3 September 2020) was a Syrian agricultural engineer and politician. He held the position of Minister of Agriculture and Agrarian Reform from February 2013 until August 2020 within the Council of Ministers, or cabinet, of Prime Ministers Wael Nader al-Halqi and Imad Khamis.

Al-Qadri died from COVID-19 during the COVID-19 pandemic in Syria, at Al Assad University Hospital in Damascus on 3 September 2020. He was the first Syrian government official to die from COVID-19 during the pandemic in Syria.
