= Mohammad Rami Radwan Martini =

Syrian politician

His Excellency Mohammad Rami Radwan Martini
- محمد رامي رضوان مارتيني

Minister of Tourism
- In office 26 November 2018 – 8 December 2024
- President: Bashar al-Assad
- Prime Minister: Imad Khamis; Hussein Arnous; Mohammad Ghazi al-Jalali
- Preceded by: Bishr Al Yaziji
- Succeeded by: Mazen al-Salhani (Note: Vacant from 10 December 2024 until 29 March 2025)

Deputy Minister of Tourism
- In office April 2014 – 26 November 2018
- President: Bashar al-Assad
- Prime Minister: Wael Nader al-Halqi; Imad Khamis

Personal details
- Born: 1970 (age 55–56) Aleppo, Aleppo Governorate, Syria
- Children: 3
- Education: Aleppo University
- Occupation: Bachelor of Engineering
- Profession: Politician, Civil Engineer

Mohammad Rami Radwan Martini (Arabic: محمد رامي رضوان مارتيني) (born 1970) is a Syrian engineer and politician. He had served as Minister of Tourism under the Assad regime until its collapse in December 2024.

== Early life and education ==
Martini is a Syrian civil engineer and was born in Aleppo, where he obtained a BA in Civil Engineering - specialization in project management from Aleppo University. He is married and has 3 children.

== Career ==
Previously, he held the position of deputy minister of tourism between April 2014 and November 2018.

Martini headed the first official Syrian delegation to Riyadh after the official relations between the two countries were severed after the Syrian crisis in 2011.

=== Sanctions ===
In March 2019, Martini was included in the European Union's sanctions against Syria due to the violent repression of civilians in the country since 2011.
