= Tanenbaum Center for Interreligious Understanding =

US non-profit organization

- Formation: 1992
- Type: Non-profit organization
- Headquarters: New York, New York, United States
- CEO: Joyce S. Dubensky
- Key people: Georgette Bennett, President and Founder
- Website: tanenbaum.org

Tanenbaum Center for Interreligious Understanding (or Tanenbaum) is a secular non-profit organization that works to promote mutual respect and understanding and fight religious prejudice in workplaces, schools, health care settings and conflict zones. Headquartered in New York, New York, Tanenbaum was founded in 1992 by Georgette Bennett in memory of her late husband, Rabbi Marc H. Tanenbaum. Tanenbaum's activity revolves around five programs: religion and diversity in the workplace, religion in education, religion and healthcare, religion and conflict resolution, and the religious roots of prejudice and interreligious affairs.

== History ==
Tanenbaum was founded in 1992 by Georgette Bennett. Originally named the Rabbi Marc H. Tanenbaum Foundation, the organization started by focusing on promoting studies aimed at ending religious bias.

Since its founding, Tanenbaum has focused on how these biases play out in the real world – in schools, workplaces, health care settings and conflict areas – designing practical programs to overcome religious intolerance and prevent religiously-motivated violence.

== Mission ==
Tanenbaum believes in a safe world "in which religious differences are respected and daily life reflects the highest values of our shared religious and ethical traditions."

Tanenbaum designs trainings and educational materials that aim to lead to a greater understanding and respect between people of different religious backgrounds.

== Work ==
Tanenbaum's work is grouped around five practical programs, each with a specific set of tools and resources: religion in the workplace, religion in schools, religion and health care, religion and conflict resolution and interreligious affairs.

Tanenbaum's Peacemakers in Action Network is a group of individuals who are fighting violence and intolerance in some of the most dangerous conflict areas around the world. The Network allows these men and women to help share information and ideas, coordinate on-the-ground interventions and help each other get out of harm. Currently, there are 26 living Peacemakers in Action who operate in 23 conflict and post-conflict zones.

In 2010, Tanenbaum received a two-year grant from the Henry R. Luce Foundation to develop case studies on religious peacemakers. It received a second grant from the foundation in 2015 to disseminate the second Peacemakers in Action volume.
