= Tammam Raad =

Syrian politician

His Excellency Tammam Raad
- تمام رعد

Minister of Water Resources
- In office 30 August 2020 – 13 December 2023
- President: Bashar al-Assad
- Prime Minister: Hussein Arnous
- Preceded by: Hussein Arnous
- Succeeded by: Hussein Makhlouf

Personal details
- Born: 1965 (age 60–61) Homs, Homs Governorate, Syria
- Party: Ba'ath Party
- Children: 3
- Education: Al-Baath University
- Occupation: Doctor of Civil Engineering
- Profession: Politician

Tammam Raad (Arabic: تمام رعد) (born 1965) is a Syrian politician, the former Minister of Water Resources between 2020 and 2023.

== Education and career ==
- 2004-2005: Director of Homs branch to the Orontes basin, head of Planning and Studies
- 2004-2011: Assistant director of Water Resources in Homs Governorate
- 2011-2015: Manager of water resources at Homs
- 2013: PhD in Civil Engineering, specialized in Engineering and Water Resources Management
- 2015-2019: General manager of the General Company for Water and Engineering Studies
- 2019-2020: General Director of the Public establishment for Land reclamation

== Political career ==
He was appointed Minister of Water Resources in the First Hussein Arnous government at its founding in August 2020. He was dismissed in December 2023.

== Personal life ==
He got married with three children.
