= Mohammed Taha al-Ahmed =

Syrian politician (born 1982)

Mohammed al-Ahmed
- محمد الأحمد

Chairman of the Higher Committee for People’s Assembly Elections
- In office 13 June 2025 – 12 July 2026
- President: Ahmed al-Sharaa

Assistant Foreign Minister for Arab Affairs
- Incumbent
- Assumed office 10 May 2025
- President: Ahmed al-Sharaa
- Minister: Asaad al-Shaibani

Minister of Agriculture and Agrarian Reform
- In office 10 December 2024 – 29 March 2025
- President: Ahmed al-Sharaa
- Prime Minister: Mohammed al-Bashir
- De facto leader: Ahmed al-Sharaa (Note: As de facto leader until 29 January 2025.)
- Preceded by: Fayez al-Miqdad
- Succeeded by: Amjad Badr

Minister of Economy and Resources in the Syrian Salvation Government
- In office 2017 – 16 November 2019
- Prime Minister: Mohammad al-Sheikh; Fawaz Hilal

Personal details
- Born: 1982 (age 43–44) Hama, Syria
- Party: Independent
- Other political affiliations: Hay'at Tahrir al-Sham (until 2025)
- Education: University of Aleppo; Cairo University; University of Idlib
- Occupation: Politician, agricultural engineer

Mohammed Taha al-Ahmed (Note: Arabic: محمد طه الأحمد; born 1982) is a Syrian politician who is the current Assistant Foreign Minister for Arab Affairs since May 2025, and the former Minister of Agriculture and Agrarian Reform in the Syrian caretaker government, having held the position from December 2024 until March 2025. He had previously served as Minister of Agriculture and Irrigation in the Syrian Salvation Government until December 2024.

== Education ==
Al-Ahmed holds a bachelor's degree in agricultural engineering from the University of Aleppo, earned in 2007. He completed a master's degree in financial and economic assessment of agricultural projects from Cairo University in 2012. In 2020, he received a PhD in agricultural development from the University of Idlib.

== Career ==
During the Syrian civil war, al-Ahmed actively participated in the revolutionary movement from its outset. He served as the Director of the Idlib Administration in 2017 and later became the Director of the Civil Administration for Services.

He served as Minister of Economy and Resources during the first and second terms of the Syrian Salvation Government. Subsequently, he was appointed as Minister of Agriculture and Irrigation, a position he held during the third, fourth, fifth, and sixth terms.

In 2024, following the fall of the Assad regime and the decision that ministers of the salvation government will serve in the same roles in the caretaker government until March 2025, al-Ahmed began serving as minister of agriculture and agrarian reform in the Syrian caretaker government under prime minister Mohammed al-Bashir.

On 10 May 2025, he was appointed Assistant Foreign Minister for Arab Affairs. On 13 June 2025, Presidential Decree 66 was issued, which established the Higher Committee for People's Assembly Elections. The 11-member committee, chaired by al-Ahmed, who served as Chairman of the Higher Committee for People’s Assembly Elections, was responsible for overseeing the formation of electoral subcommittees, which elected two-thirds of the members of parliament.

== See also ==
- Cabinet of Syria
