= Hussein Makhlouf =

Syrian politician

His Excellency Hussein Makhlouf
- حسين مخلوف

Minister of Water Resources
- In office 13 December 2023 – 23 September 2024
- President: Bashar al-Assad
- Prime Minister: Hussein Arnous
- Preceded by: Tammam Raad
- Succeeded by: Moataz Qattan

Minister of Local Administration and Environment
- In office 22 June 2016 – 13 December 2023
- President: Bashar al-Assad
- Prime Minister: Wael Nader al-Halqi; Imad Khamis; Hussein Arnous
- Preceded by: Omar Ibrahim Ghalawanji
- Succeeded by: Lamia Youssef Shakour

Governor of Rif Dimashq Governorate
- In office 1 October 2011 – 22 June 2016
- President: Bashar al-Assad
- Prime Minister: Adel Safar; Riyad Hijab; Omar Ibrahim Ghalawanji; Wael Nader al-Halqi
- Preceded by: Zahid Hajj Musa
- Succeeded by: Alaa Mounir Ibrahim

Personal details
- Born: 1964 (age 61–62) Latakia, Latakia Governorate, Syria
- Party: Ba'ath Party
- Children: 4
- Education: Tishreen University
- Occupation: Civil engineering
- Profession: Politician, Civil Engineer, Civil servant

Hussein Makhlouf Makhlouf (Arabic: حسين مخلوف مخلوف; born 1964) is a Syrian politician. He is former Water Resources Minister.

== Career ==
Occupied several posts at the Coast Company for Construction and Building and the General Establishment of Construction and Building, and chaired a project for expanding Lattakia port.

Director of Water Resources Department (2006-2011), chairing joint committees with Lebanon, Jordan, and Turkey on water affairs.

He was Governor of the Damascus Countryside Governate from 2011 to 2016. Between 2016 and 2023, he served as a Local Administration and Environment Minister.
