= Salam Safaf =

Syrian politician (born 1979)

Her Excellency Salam Mohammad al-Safaf
- سلام محمد الصفاف

Minister of Administrative Development
- In office 29 March 2017 – 8 December 2024
- President: Bashar al-Assad
- Prime Minister: Imad Khamis; Hussein Arnous; Mohammad Ghazi al-Jalali
- Preceded by: Hassan al-Nouri
- Succeeded by: Fadi al-Qassem

Deputy Minister of Administrative Development
- In office 27 August 2014 – 29 March 2017
- President: Bashar al-Assad
- Prime Minister: Wael Nader al-Halqi; Imad Khamis
- Preceded by: Position established

Personal details
- Born: 1979 (age 46–47) Damascus, Damascus Governorate, Syria
- Education: Damascus University; University of Toulouse-Jean Jaurès (PhD); National Institute of Public Administration
- Profession: Politician

Salam Mohammad al-Safaf (Arabic: سلام محمد السفاف) (born 1979) is a Syrian politician who served as Administrative Development Minister since 29 March 2017 until 8 December 2024, the day the Assad regime fell. She served as Assistant Minister of Administrative Development.

== Education ==
She graduated from Damascus University and the University of Toulouse-Jean Jaurès.

== Career ==
She supervised organizational structures and statutes of a number of ministries.
