= Ministry of Agriculture (Syria) =

Government ministry of Syria

- وزارة الزراعة; Wizārat az-Zirāʿat

Agency overview
- Formed: 1948
- Jurisdiction: Government of Syria
- Headquarters: Saadallah Al Jabiri Street, Al-Baramkeh, Damascus, Syria
- Minister responsible: Basel al-Suweydan
- Website: moaar.gov.sy

The Ministry of Agriculture (Arabic: وزارة الزراعة, romanized: Wizārat az-Zirāʿat) is a government ministry office responsible for agriculture affairs in Syria.

== Ministers of Agriculture ==
- Dr. Shibli al-Aysami (9 March 1963 – 11 November 1963)
- Dr. Adil Tarabin (12 November 1963 – 21 December 1965)
- Dr. Salah Wazzan (1 January 1966 – 22 February 1966)
- Dr. Abd al-Karim al-Jundi (1 March 1966 – 15 October 1966)
- Mr. Fayez Al Jassem (Oct 1966 – Oct 1969)
- Jamid Haddad (? – ?)
- Mohamad Haidar (1971-1976)
- Ahmed Qablan (1976-1980)
- Hamid Musker (1980-1981)
- Mash Jayden (1981-1985)
- Mahmoud al-Kurdi (1985-1987)
- Dr. Mohamed Gabash (1 November 1987 – 1992)
- Dr. Adel Safar (10 September 2003 – 14 April 2011)
- Dr. Riyad Farid Hijab (14 April 2011 – 6 August 2012)
- Subhi Ahmed Abdullah (6 August 2012 – 9 February 2013)
- Ahmed Al-Qadri (9 February 2013 – 30 August 2020)
- Eng Mohammed Hassan Qatana (30 August 2020 – 23 September 2024)
- Dr. Fayez al-Miqdad (23 September 2024 – 10 December 2024)
- Mohammed Taha al-Ahmed (10 December 2024 – 29 March 2025)
- Amjad Badr (29 March 2025 – 9 May 2026)
- Basel al-Suweydan (9 May 2026 – present)

== See also ==
- Ministry of Irrigation
- National Agricultural Policy Center
