= Ministry of Endowments (Syria) =

Government ministry of Syria

- وزارة الأوقاف

Agency overview
- Formed: 1944
- Jurisdiction: Government of Syria
- Headquarters: Damascus
- Minister responsible: Mohammed Abu al-Khair Shukri
- Website: mow.gov.sy

The Ministry of Endowments, also known as the Ministry of Awqaf (Arabic: وزارة الأوقاف, romanized: Wizārat al-Awqāf), is a department of the Government of Syria.

== Responsibilities ==
The ministry is responsible for Islamic religious affairs and the administration of endowments.

== Ministers for Endowments ==
=== First Syrian Republic (1930–1950) ===
- Abd al-Rahman al-Kayyali (14 October 1944 – 1 April 1945)
- Said al-Ghazzi (7 April 1945 – 16 August 1945)

=== United Arab Republic (1958–1961) ===
- Youssef Muzahim (17 March 1960 – 28 September 1961)

=== Second Syrian Republic (Syrian Arab Republic) (1961–1963) ===
- Ahmed Sultan (29 September 1961 – 21 November 1961)
- Mustafa al-Zarqa (22 November 1961 – 15 April 1962)
- Rashid Humaidan (16 April 1962 – 16 September 1962)
- Asaad al-Kourani (17 September 1962 – 9 March 1963)

=== Ba'athist Syria (1963–2024) ===
- Darwish al-Alwani (9 March 1963 – 31 March 1963)
- Mazhar al-Anbari (1 April 1963 – 30 April 1963)
- Ahmed Mahdi al-Khidr (1 May 1963 – 12 April 1963)
- Abdul Rahman al-Tabbaa (13 May 1963 – 10 February 1964)
- Abdul Rahman Al Kawakibi (13 May 1964 – 31 December 1965)
- Mohammed Ghaleb Abdoun (16 January 1966 – 4 April 1971)
- Abdul Sattar Khair al-Din al-Asadi (4 April 1971 – 13 January 1980)
- Mohammed al-Khatib (14 January 1980 – 30 October 1987)
- Abdel Majid Trabelsi (1 November 1987 – 7 February 1996)
- Mohammed Abdul Raouf Ziada (7 April 1996 - 3 October 2004)
- Ziyad al-Din al-Ayyubi (3 October 2004 – 7 December 2007)
- Mohammed Abdul Sattar (8 December 2007 – 8 December 2024)

=== Syrian caretaker government (2024–2025) ===
- Mohammed Abdul Sattar (8 December 2024 – 10 December 2024)
- Hussam Haj Hussein (10 December 2024 – 29 March 2025)

=== Syrian transitional government (2025–present) ===
- Mohammed Abu al-Khair Shukri (29 March 2025 – present)

== See also ==
- Government ministries of Syria
- Cabinet of Syria
- First Syrian Republic
- United Arab Republic
- Second Syrian Republic (Syrian Arab Republic)
- Ba'athist Syria
