= Mohammed Abdul Sattar =

Syrian politician

- محمد عبد الستار

Minister of Awqaf
- In office 8 December 2007 – 10 December 2024
- President: Bashar al-Assad
- Prime Minister: Muhammad Naji al-Otari; Adel Safar; Riyad Farid Hijab; Omar Ibrahim Ghalawanji; Wael Nader al-Halqi; Imad Khamis; Hussein Arnous; Mohammad Ghazi al-Jalali
- Preceded by: Ziad al-Din al-Ayoubi
- Succeeded by: Hussam Haj Hussein

Personal details
- Born: 1958 (age 67–68) Tartus, Tartous Governorate, Syria
- Party: Ba'ath Party
- Children: 3
- Education: University of Damascus

Mohammed Abdul Sattar (Arabic: محمد عبد الستار) (born 1958, Tartus) was the Minister of Awqaf of Syria.

== Early life and education and career ==
Sattar was born into a Sunni Muslim family in the multicultural and multireligious town of Tartus in 1958. He has a Degree in Economy and Trade (1980) and PhD in Islamic Studies (2000) from Damascus University.

== Career ==
From 1985 until 2002 he was the Director of Religious Endowments and Mufti of Tartous Province. He was subsequently appointed Assistant Minister of Religious Endowments for Religious Affairs in 2002. In 2007 he became the Minister of Religious Endowments for Religious Affairs (Awqaf) of Syria.

President Bashar al-Assad is a member of the Alawites sect of Shia Muslims who are in the minority yet form the elite of the military officers. They rule over the majority religious group the Sunni. When the Syrian uprising began in March 2011 Sattar was one of several Sunni who supported the regime.

In July 2016 President Bashar al-Assad announced the make up of the new Syrian government in Decree no. 203 of 2016. Dr Mohammed Abdul-Sattar al-Sayyed retained his position.

As minister he has participated in several conferences and delivered lectures. At the Kiwan mosque during the 2015 International Media Conference Against Terrorism Sattar spoke of the martyrs who have defended the faith in Syria in the war against Takfiri Terrorism.

Sattar has been on the U.S. Department of the Treasury Office of Foreign Assets Control Specially Designated Nationals and Blocked Persons List since 2012. This means his assets are blocked and United States citizens are not permitted to have dealings with him. He is also listed on the Consolidated list of Financial Sanctions Targets in the UK last updated 2 June 2016. The European Union also has "restrictive measures against Syria" and added Dr. Mohammad Abdul Sattar Al Sayed to the list of persons 16 October 2012 as he "shares responsibility for the regime’s violent repression against the civilian population."

== Contact with other religious groups in Syria ==
The religious majority in Syria are Sunni Muslims who are around 70% of the population while Christians are around 10%. Although Christians are a minority they have been politically influential and after the uprising many militant Christians supported Bashar al-Assad in the hope that this will offer some protection against Islamists coming to power. Sattar has worked with Christians to keep the lines of communications open and to encourage Christian support for the government and its aims. In March 2013 at the Preachers and Imans in the Middle and Coastal Regions Forum held in Tartous the Minister spoke of Christians and Muslims working together to spread tolerance and friendship. In June 2014 Sattar with a delegation of Muslim scholars visited the newly installed Patriarch of Antioch Mor Ignatius Aphrem II of the Syriac Orthodox Church. Both expressed the view that Muslims and Christians should cooperate and work together for peace.

== Personal life ==
Sattar is married and has three children.

== See also ==
- Council of Ministers (Syria)
