= Suhail Mohammad Abdullatif =

Syrian politician

HE Suhail Mohammad Abdullatif سهيل محمد عبداللطيف

Minister Public Works and Housing
- In office 26 November 2018 – 23 September 2024
- President: Bashar al-Assad
- Prime Minister: Imad Khamis; Hussein Arnous
- Preceded by: Hussein Arnous
- Succeeded by: Hamza Ali

Personal details
- Born: 1961 (age 64–65) Latakia, Latakia Governorate, Syria
- Children: 3
- Education: Damascus University
- Occupation: Bachelor of Civil Engineering
- Profession: Public servant, Politician

Suhail Mohammad Abdullatif (Arabic: سهيل محمد عبداللطيف) (born 1961) is a Syrian politician. He was the Public Works and Housing Minister between 2018 and 2024. Before becoming a minister, he held several public positions, such as the position of Director of General Establishment for Housing.
