= Ministry of Tourism (Syria) =

Government ministry of Syria

- وزارة السياحة

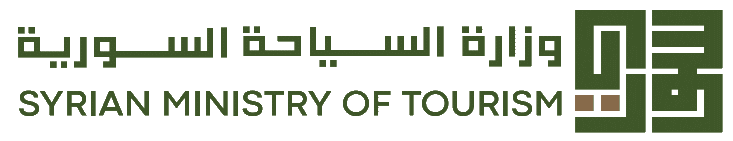

Agency overview
- Formed: 1972
- Jurisdiction: Government of Syria
- Headquarters: Damascus
- Minister responsible: Mazen al-Salhani
- Website: mots.gov.sy

The Ministry of Tourism (Arabic: وزارة السياحة, romanized: Wizārat al-Siyāḥah) is a ministry within the government of Syria.

Former logo until 2025.

== Responsibilities ==
The ministry is responsible for the promotion and development of domestic and foreign tourism, by what it does directly or through companies and tourism institutions, such as tourism marketing and tourism services, and the establishment and investment of tourist areas and facilities, directly or indirectly, and generally undertook all matters related to tourism and vacationing in the country. The ministry also managed tourism facilities and their investment, and tourism training through hotel vocational high schools and technical institutes for tourism and hotel sciences.

== See also ==
- Government ministries of Syria
- Tourism in Syria
