= Hussein Arnous =

Prime minister of Syria (2020–2024)

- حسين عرنوس
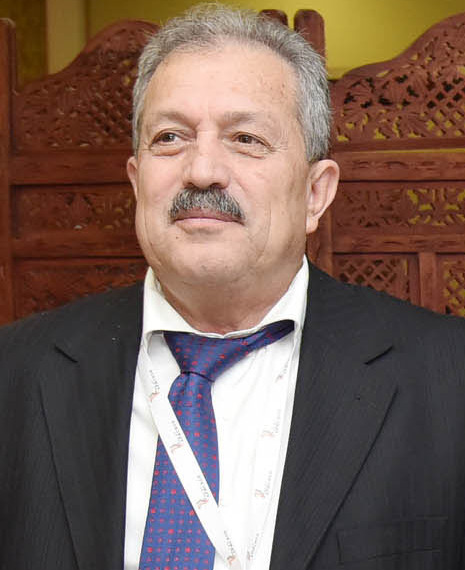
- Arnous in 2016

Prime Minister of Syria
- In office 2 September 2020 – 14 September 2024; Acting: 11 June – 2 September 2020
- President: Bashar al-Assad
- Deputy: Ali Abdullah Ayyoub
- Preceded by: Imad Khamis
- Succeeded by: Mohammad Ghazi al-Jalali

Minister of Water Resources
- In office 26 November 2018 – 30 August 2020
- Prime Minister: Imad Khamis
- Preceded by: Nabil al-Hassan
- Succeeded by: Tammam Raad

Minister of Public Works and Housing
- In office 9 February 2013 – 26 November 2018
- Prime Minister: Wael Nader al-Halqi; Imad Khamis
- Preceded by: Yasser Sebaei
- Succeeded by: Suhail Mohammad Abdullatif

Member of the Central Command of the Syrian Regional Branch of the Baath Party
- Incumbent
- Assumed office 8 July 2013

Governor of Quneitra
- In office 2011–2013
- Preceded by: Khalil Mashhadia

Governor of Deir ez-Zor
- In office 2009–2011
- Preceded by: Khaled Dali Al-Ahmad
- Succeeded by: Samir Ousman al-Sheikh

Personal details
- Born: 1953 (age 72–73) Al-Tah, Idlib, Syrian Republic
- Party: Ba'ath Party
- Other political affiliations: National Progressive Front
- Education: University of Aleppo (BS)
- Cabinet: Arnous I Arnous II

Hussein Arnous (Arabic: حسين عرنوس, romanized: Ḥusain ʿArnūs; born 1953) is a former Syrian politician who served as prime minister of Syria from 11 June 2020 to 14 September 2024. Arnous's appointment was announced by state media shortly after it was reported that President Bashar al-Assad had fired previous prime minister Imad Khamis amid a worsening economic crisis.

== Early life and education ==
Arnous was born in the village of Al-Tah in the Ma'arrat al-Nu'man District, Idlib. In 1978, he earned a degree in civil engineering from the University of Aleppo.

== Career ==
After graduating from university, Arnous worked with the Idlib Engineering Syndicate. From 1992 to 2002, he managed the General Company for Roads and Bridges. In 2004, Arnous was selected to serve as executive director of the General Establishment for Road Transport. He then served as governor of Deir ez-Zor and Quneitra governorates. In 2014, Arnous was included on a list of Syrian government ministers banned from entering the United States or European Union.

Arnous served as Minister of Public Works and Housing from 2013 until 2018 and as Minister of Water Resources since 26 November 2018.

Arnous was confirmed by President Assad to be the prime minister of a new government on 30 August 2020. He took the oath of office three days later. He formed a new government in August 2021 after the presidential election in May 2021.

Political offices
Preceded by Imad Khamis	Prime Minister of Syria; 2020–2024	Succeeded by Mohammad Ghazi al-Jalali
