= 2014 Syrian presidential election =

- 3 June 2014
- Turnout: 73.42%
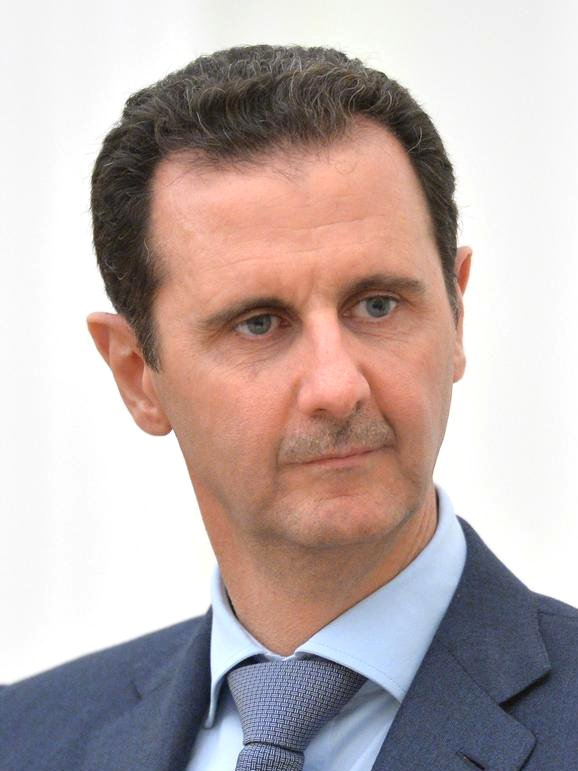

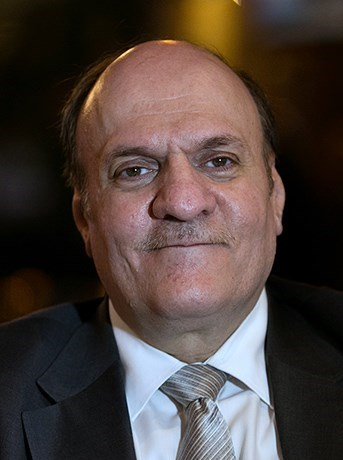
Nominee	Bashar al-Assad	Hassan al-Nouri
Party	Ba'ath Party	NIACS
Alliance	NPF
Popular vote	10,319,723	500,279
Percentage	92.20%	4.47%
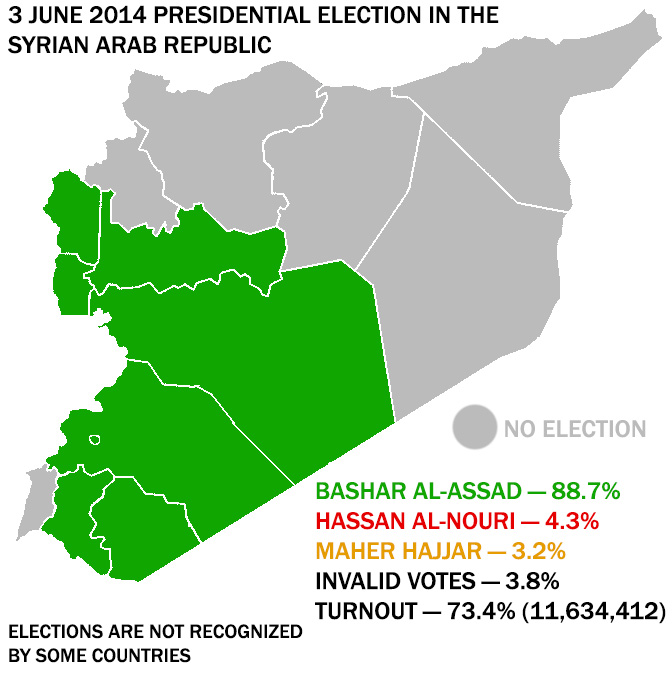
President before election
Bashar al-Assad
Ba'ath Party
Elected President
Bashar al-Assad
Ba'ath Party

Presidential elections were held in Syria on 3 June 2014. This was the first direct presidential election in Syria since the 1953 presidential election and the first multi-candidate election. The result was a landslide victory for Bashar al-Assad, who received over 90% of the valid votes. He was sworn in for a third seven-year term on 16 July in the presidential palace in Damascus. There is scholarly consensus that the elections were not democratic.

The elections took place amidst the Syrian civil war, which had begun three years before. As a result of the war, the country had the largest refugee population in the world at the time of the elections, with voting for refugees in certain foreign countries began at Syrian embassies several days before voting in Syria. Domestic and foreign-based Syrian opposition groups boycotted the election and voting did not take place in large parts of Syria under rebel control. The areas under Kurdish militia control also did not allow voting due to the refusal of the government to recognize their claim for regional autonomy, though some people traveled to government–controlled areas to vote.

The Gulf Cooperation Council, the European Union and the United States decried the election as illegitimate. Attempts to hold an election under the circumstances of a civil war were also criticized by UN secretary general Ban Ki-moon and it was widely reported that the elections lacked independent election monitoring.

== Background ==
Since 2011, the country has been plagued by the Syrian civil war that has factionalised the population largely, but not entirely, along sectarian religious and/or ethnic grounds. The UK-based Syrian Observatory for Human Rights states that the war has claimed over 150,000 lives. One third of the country's population of 23 million (some 7 million) have been displaced, with 2.5 million as refugees in foreign countries.

A Spokesperson for the United Nations Secretary General Ban Ki-moon warned that amid the ongoing war and large-scale displacement of Syrian citizens, "such elections are incompatible with the letter and spirit of the Geneva communiqué" and would "damage prospects of a political solution with the opposition. We will, nonetheless, continue to search and build upon any opening to a solution to the tragedy in Syria." Syrian Rebels and opposition parties refused to attend the peace conference (the ultimate goal of the Geneva communiqué) unless Assad was removed from power and barred from any future leadership position. The peace talks had failed before they ever began because what was intended to be a negotiation became only an ultimatum. The derailment of the Peace talks is in stark contrast to the stated goals of the UN towards resolving the conflict.

=== Refugees ===
The 2.5 million refugees and their ability to vote has resulted in several controversies surrounding this election. Hundreds of thousands of refugees who did not leave Syria officially via border posts have been excluded from voting.

In Beirut, Lebanon, which hosts some 1.1 million Syrian refugees, the roads were paralyzed because of the huge number of Syrian refugees and Syrian expatriates already living in Lebanon that wanted to vote at the embassy.

=== Expatriate voting ===
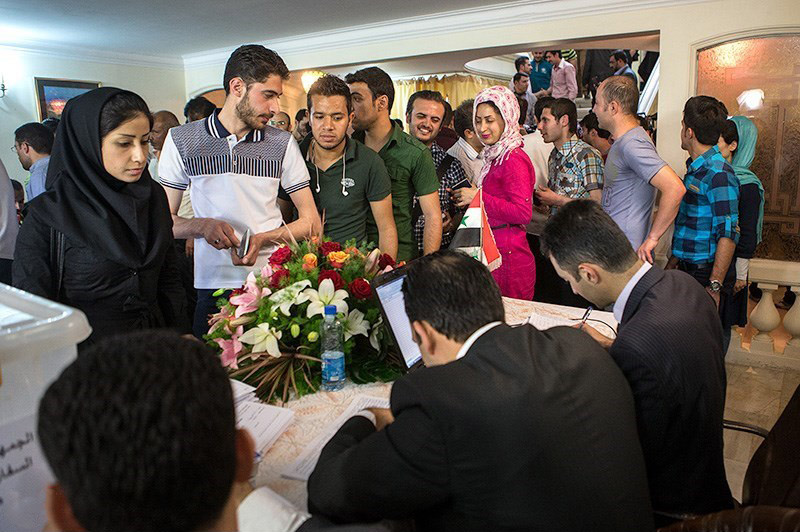
Expatriate voting at the Syrian embassy in Tehran (28 May 2014)

==== Permitted ====
Syrian expatriates were able to vote in the Syrian embassies of the following nations:

- Algeria
- Armenia
- Austria
- Belarus
- China
- Cuba
- Cyprus
- Czech Republic
- India
- Indonesia
- Iran
- Iraq (hosted Syrian refugees)
- Lebanon (hosted Syrian refugees)
- Malaysia
- Mauritania
- Nigeria
- Oman
- Pakistan
- Poland
- Romania
- Russia
- Serbia
- South Africa
- Sweden
- Ukraine
- Venezuela
- Yemen

==== Refused ====
The following ten countries did not allow expatriate voting to be held in Syrian diplomatic missions. Those foreign governments' decisions were welcomed by the Syrian National Council, a Syrian opposition organization and an opponent of Bashar al-Assad.

- Belgium
- Canada
- Egypt
- France
- Germany
- Jordan (hosted Syrian refugees)
- Qatar
- Saudi Arabia
- Turkey (hosted Syrian refugees)
- United Arab Emirates
- United Kingdom
- United States

== Electoral system ==
The new constitution, adopted following the 2012 Syrian constitutional referendum, changed the nature of the presidential election from a referendum to a multi-candidate electoral ballot. As a result, this election marks the first time that candidates can challenge the incumbent president; the first nominally democratic election in Syria's history. A law adopted by the Syrian parliament in early 2014 restricts candidacy to individuals who have lived in Syria for the past ten years, thereby preventing exiled people from running.

On 8 April, Syrian Information Minister Omran al-Zoubi announced that candidates will be able to submit their applications during the last ten days of April. al-Zoubi insisted that despite the ongoing civil war that the election would proceed on schedule, and wouldn't be delayed for any reason. He also claimed that the "overwhelming majority" of Syrians wished to see incumbent President Bashar al-Assad re-elected. al-Zoubi added that government military operations would continue despite the election.

== Candidates ==
Article 84 of the Constitution of Syria required that candidates for the presidency must:

1. Be at least 40 years old
2. Be Syrian by birth, of parents who are Syrians by birth
3. Enjoy civil and political rights and not convicted of a dishonorable felony, even if he was reinstated
4. Not be married to a non-Syrian wife
5. Have lived in Syria for 10 years continuously upon nomination

Further eligibility requirements in the constitution include:

- The religion of the President is Islam (Article 3)
- A candidate must be supported by at least 35 members of the People's Assembly (Article 85)
- The President cannot carry another nationality (Article 152)

A total of 24 candidates, including 2 women and a Christian, submitted applications to the Supreme Constitutional Court for the presidency. Of these, two candidates other than Assad met all the conditions to run, including the support of 35 members of the parliament. The two other candidates chosen to run are seen as "mostly symbolic contenders" and "little known figures".

- Bashar al-Assad, the incumbent president, leader of Ba'ath Party
- Hassan Abdullah al-Nouri, from the National Initiative for Administration and Change in Syria, a 54-year-old MP from Damascus
- Maher Abd Al-Hafiz Hajjar, formerly from the People's Will Party, a 43-year-old MP from Aleppo. This party is led by veteran opposition leader Qadri Jamil who supported the initial protests in 2011 but then described calls for the overthrow of the government as "unrealistic and useless". Jamil was a member of the committee that drafted the new Constitution of Syria in 2011. However, People's Will won just two of 250 MPs in the 2012 parliamentary election with their allies from the Syrian Social Nationalist Party won a further four. Jamil was nominated Deputy Prime Minister by President Assad in June 2012 but was removed in October 2013. The small number of MPs from the party indicates that most of his nominations must have come from either independents or MPs from the ruling National Progressive Front. A statement from the People's Will Party on 27 April distanced the party from Hajjar, claiming that Hajjar was no longer a member of either the People's Will Party, or the Popular Front for Liberation and Change. Instead the statement claimed that Hajjar represented only himself.

The other 21 candidates that did not meet the criteria were:

- Sawsan Omar al-Haddad, born in Latakia Governorate in 1963. (woman)
- Sameer Ahmad Mo'alla, born in Quneitra Governorate in 1961.
- Mohammad Firas Yassin Rajjouh, born in Damascus in 1966.
- Abdul-Salam Youssef Salameh, born in Homs governorate in 1971.
- Ali Mohammad Wannous, born in Homs in 1973.
- Azza Mohammad Wajih al-Hallaq, born in Damascus in 1962. (woman)
- Talie Saleh Nasser, born in Kafrin in 1967.
- Samih Mikhael Mousa, born in Btaiha in 1963. (Christian)
- Mahmoud Khalil Halbouni, born in Harasta in 1946.
- Mohammad Hassan al-Kanaan, born in al-Sanamayn in 1964.
- Khaled Abdo al-Kreidi, born in al-Al in 1966.
- Basheer Mohammad al-Balah, born in Damascus in 1931.
- Ahmad Hassoun al-Abboud, born in Mayadin in 1962
- Ayman Shamdin al-Issa Alam, born in al-Husseinyeh in 1967.
- Ziad Adnan Hakawati, born in Damascus in 1955.
- Ahmad Ali Qsei’eh, born in Jabaq in 1951.
- Mahmoud Mohammad Nassr, born in Zahiriye in 1969.
- Ali Hassan al-Hassan, born in Deir Saras in 1965.
- Ahmad Omar Dabba, born in Tazeh Shamaliye in 1969.
- Mahmoud Naji Moussa, born in Tadmur in 1950.
- Hossein Mohammad Tijan, born in Aleppo in 1961.

== Conduct ==
The Syrian government said election monitors would not be allowed from the United States, European Union, or the Organization for Security and Co-operation in Europe, but other observers would be present. There were no independent election monitors for the election, but an international delegation did observe the election. It was reported to have included representatives from more than 30 countries including Brazil, India, Iran, Russia, Uganda, the US, and Venezuela. Other delegates expected to join were from China, South Africa, Cuba, Nicaragua, Bolivia, Ecuador and Canada. Among the delegates were Iran's Alaeddin Boroujerdi, Alexey Alexandrov of Russia's ruling United Russia, William Fariñas of Venezuela's ruling United Socialist Party of Venezuela, Benna Namugwanya Bugembe of Uganda's ruling National Resistance Movement, Brazilian Socorro Gomes of the Communist World Peace Council, Indian anti-Zionist activist Feroze Mithiborwala, and US-based pro-Assad activist Paul Larudee.

== Results ==
The Supreme Constitutional Court announced on Wednesday 4 June that turnout for the election was 73.42%, with 11,634,412 of the 15,845,575 Syrians eligible to take part voting. The number for Syrians eligible to vote is based on the government's data of all Syrians living in Syria and abroad over the age of 18; this includes all Syrians in government-held territory, rebel-held territory, refugees, newly naturalized Kurds, and declared Syrian expatriates.

The number of invalid papers was 442,108, or 3.8%. Majed Khadra, the Spokesperson of the Supreme Constitutional Court, also announced that the losing candidates and individuals with complaints about the electoral process had 3 days to submit their appeals. He stated that the court would decide the outcome in the 7 days following the three-day appeal period, and then would announce the name of the declared winner by means of the Speaker of the People's Assembly. The same day the Speaker of the People's Assembly, Mohammad Jihad al-Laham, announced the raw data results.

Candidate	Party	Votes	%
Bashar al-Assad	Ba'ath Party	10,319,723	92.20
Hassan al-Nouri	NIACS	500,279	4.47
Maher Hajjar	Independent	372,301	3.33
Total		11,192,303	100.00
Valid votes		11,192,303	96.20
Invalid/blank votes		442,108	3.80
Total votes		11,634,411	100.00
Registered voters/turnout		15,845,575	73.42
Source: SANA (WA), SANA (WA)

Statistician Andrew Gelman suggested that the results could be fabricated based on the unlikely accurate numbers. For example, 10,319,723/11,634,412 = 0.886999962, so the 88.7% of all votes number for Bashar al-Assad is correct to the nearest single voter. Similarly, the proportion for NIACS comes out at 0.042999938 and for the Independent party at 0.031999985. But whilst Gelman argues that the published counts were fabricated, he notes that it does not preclude the theory that those numbers could have been generated retrospectively (and unprofessionally) from valid percentages. The proportion reported for turnout, 0.734237287, does not exhibit the unusual property found in the vote counts.

Carnegie Endowment for International Peace analyst Aron Lund noted that

[T]he government claims that a total of 11,634,412 Syrians took part in the election. Assad currently controls some 60 percent of Syria’s approximately 22 million citizens—maybe even more—but two out of five would have been too young to vote. Even under the demonstrably false premise that every single adult in Assad-held territory went to the polls and was joined by every single adult refugee abroad, the result would still be a million or so short of the official figure.

== Reactions ==
=== Domestic ===
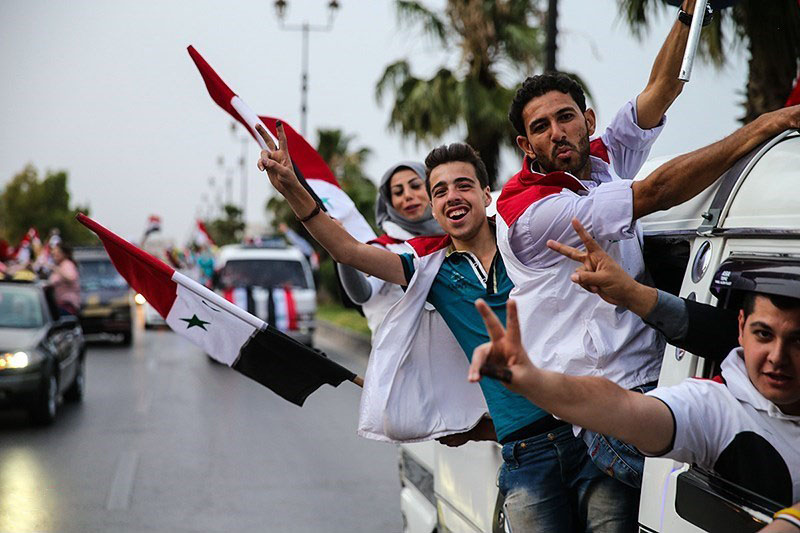
Damascus residents celebrating the re-election victory of President Bashar al-Assad (4 June 2014)

- Hassan al-Nouri held a press conference at the Damascus Sheraton Hotel where he congratulated President Assad for "winning confidence of the Syrian people through winning the presidential elections." Nouri said that the electoral process had been clear and transparent to the entire world, adding that both he and his representatives had inspected the vote counting. Nouri also criticised those who had called for a boycott and claimed instead that the election could do no harm or good to the Syrian people. He ended his speech stating: "I promise I was a patriotic candidate who takes part in building Syria and will be a soldier behind the Syrian Arab Army."
- Patriarch of Antioch of the Syriac Orthodox Church Ignatius Aphrem II said that the success of the presidential election in Syria and the victory of President Bashar al-Assad was a victory for all honest Syrian citizens. In a letter of congratulation, he expressed his sincere congratulations to al-Assad for winning the election and praying to God to help and guide him in his work.

=== International ===
==== Expressions of concern ====
- United Kingdom – Foreign Secretary William Hague said: "Assad lacked legitimacy before this election, and he lacks it afterwards. This election bore no relation to genuine democracy. It was held in the midst of civil war."
- United States – State Department spokeswoman Marie Harf at daily press briefing: "Today’s presidential election in Syria is a disgrace. Bashar al-Assad has no more credibility today than he did yesterday. In a country where there is not a free society, this selection process is a inconceivable situation," she said.
- Friends of Syria (a group founded by then-French president Nicolas Sarkozy) denounced the election, alleging beforehand that it would be rigged and adverse to the premise behind the Geneva II talks. The group also questioned the veracity of an election given it would be run in the middle of a civil war and only within government areas "thereby meaning that millions of Syrians unable to vote as a result of the war either due to being in areas outside government control or due to being displaced."

The Gulf Cooperation Council, the European Union and the United States all decried the election as illegitimate and a farce. State employees were told to vote or face interrogation. There were no independent monitors stationed at the polling stations. As few as 6 million eligible voters remained in Syria. Due to rebel Kurdish and ISIS control of Syrian territories there was no voting in roughly 60% of the country.

==== Expressions of congratulations ====
- Afghanistan – Afghan President Hamed Karzai expressed hope that Syria will overcome all challenges "thanks to the wisdom of its leadership and the determination of the Syrian people". He affirmed support to Syria in "combating terrorism and extremism", considering President al-Assad's presidential elections win as "a new chapter that paves the way for ending the crisis in Syria."
- Algeria – President of Algeria Abdelaziz Bouteflika sent a cable of congratulations to President of Syria, Bashar al-Assad, on the occasion of winning the presidential elections. President Bouteflika expressed, in his cable, best wishes for further progress and prosperity to the brotherly people of Syria.
- Armenia – President Serzh Sargsyan hoped that Syria will manage to re-establish peace and stability through a national dialogue in the name of the well-being and prosperity of the Syrian people. "I wish you [Bashar al-Assad] good health and successes and I wish the friendly Syrian people eternal peace."
- Belarus – In a cable of congratulation, Belarusian President Alexander Lukashenko "expressed keenness to strengthen and develop bilateral relations between Belarus and Syria in all fields for the benefit of the two peoples."
- Brunei – Sultan Hassanal Bolkiah expressed wishes for Syria to continue its advancement and his "desire to work with President al-Assad to develop cooperation and friendship ties between the two countries." Further stressing that "the Syrians’ massive turnout to polls rendered futile all attempts to fracture Syria and tear the Syrians’ unity apart. The Syrian people, by their vigorous participation in the elections, have expressed commitment to national firm principles and spoken out loud against terrorism that has plagued their country."
- Cuba – Cuban President Raúl Castro expressed hope that Syria will overcome all challenges "thanks to the wisdom of its leadership and the determination of the Syrian people." He stressed that "the victory of President al-Assad is a victory for all honest and free people who bravely supported Syria in face of the foreign conspiracies and war imposed on it".
- Guyana – President of Guyana Donald Ramotar said in his cable of congratulations to President of Syria, Bashar al-Assad, that al-Assad's win in the presidential election is a great victory for Syria, expressing his wishes for continuing friendship relations between both countries and coordinating common positions on regional and international issues.
- Iran – The Foreign Ministry published a statement that read: "All impartial foreign observers described this election as free and in a calm atmosphere. The Syrian people picked (Assad) with an overwhelming (88.7%) of votes. The Syrian people’s will overpowered America’s....This is the fruit of the Syrian people’s three years of resistance." A statement from Alaeddin Boroujerdi, head of the Iranian Parliament's Committee on National Security, said the election "happened in its constitutional time and date in a transparent democratic way".
- Hezbollah – "The elections proved that a political solution in Syria begins and ends with President Bashar al-Assad. There is a president who has been elected by millions for a new seven-year term. Those who want to work for a political solution must talk to him, negotiate with him and reach a solution with him. We call on combatants ... to move towards reconciliation and dialogue, looking for political exits to stop the bloodshed. This fighting will only increase destruction in your country and add to the bloodshed. Everyone should recognise and acknowledge that war in Syria will not lead to others taking control of it."
- Nicaragua – President Daniel Ortega said he "want[ed] to congratulate him on his resounding victory in the presidential election on Tuesday June 3. Their victory, brother President Bashar represents a reaffirmation of the commitment to peace and spirit of the Syrian people, has defended you with chivalry."
- North Korea – Supreme Leader Kim Jong-Un sent a congratulatory message to Bashar Al-Assad upon his re-election as president of Syria. The message extended warm congratulations to him upon his re-election as president of Syria thanks to the support and trust of the Syrian people.
- Palestine – President Mahmoud Abbas said that electing President al-Assad means "preserving Syria’s unity and sovereignty and that it will help end the crisis and confront terrorism, wishing prosperity and safety to Syria".
- Russia – Foreign Ministry spokesman Alexander Lukashevich saw the vote as an important event that safeguards the continued functioning of state institutions in Syria. The election was "naturally not 100 percent democratic" due to the conflict in Syria, but that turnout, transparency and the findings of foreign monitors "give us no reason to question the legitimacy of the election". "Against this background, the (...) politicised reaction to the election from some of our international partners cannot fail to cause disillusionment". "It is unacceptable to ignore the views of millions of Syrians."
  - Patriarch of Moscow and all Rus' of the Russian Orthodox Church Kirill congratulated President of Syria Bashar al-Assad for his win in recent presidential elections. In his cable, Patriarch Kirill said he is sure that "centuries-long national accord and fraternity in Syria will motivate the establishment of stability and peace there." He wished President al-Assad more courage and strength to steer Syria through the current stage and bring back security and stability, hoping that the Syrian people will see peace and stability.
- Somalia – The embassy of Somalia congratulated the Syrian people on President Bashar al-Assad's win of the presidential elections held on 3 June in Syria. It expressed Somalia's keenness on bolstering the fraternal ties between Somalia and Syria in the interests of the two peoples. Somalia hopes that the Syrian people will restore security, stability, amity and civil peace.
- South Africa – President Jacob Zuma congratulated Bashar al-Assad on winning the presidential elections. He voiced hope that the Syrian people and government will overcome the crisis affecting their country, affirming South Africa's readiness to help in this regard.
- Venezuela – President Nicolás Maduro congratulated the Syrian people and President Assad on the election results. Additionally, President Maduro reiterated his "full support for the Syrian people in their struggle for peace" and condemned "the destabilising mercenary actions that still remain in Syria, with the encouragement of NATO member countries."
