= List of political parties in Syria =

This is a list of political parties in Syria, including any current or historical party since independence. Syria in early independence saw a primarily two-party system, then followed by a long period of one-party rule during Ba'athist Syria. Since the fall of the Assad regime, Syria is under political transition and has not yet seen the emergence of major political parties.

In March 2025, the Constitutional Declaration was signed by President Ahmed al-Sharaa. It states that the state shall protect the right to political participation and the formation of political parties on national foundations in accordance with a new law, and shall guarantee the work of associations and unions.

== History ==
=== Early independence ===
During the French mandate, the National Bloc emerged to oppose French rule and fight for Syrian independence. Following independence, the bloc split into the National Party and the People's Party, which became the two major parties in the Second Syrian Republic. The Ba'ath Party also became more prominent but was not yet a dominant party.

=== Ba'athist Syria ===
Following the Ba'athist coup in 1963, the Ba'ath Party came to power and ruled during Ba'athist Syria. During this time, there were also several other allied parties with political participation, and they formed the National Progressive Front.

=== Contemporary ===
At the Syrian Revolution Victory Conference on 29 January 2025, all parties in the National Progressive Front associated with the old regime was officially banned by the Syrian caretaker government, who took power in December 2024 following the fall of the Assad regime.

== Legislation ==
=== Ba'athist Syria ===
Under Ba'athist Syria, anyone was allowed to start a new political party, however it could not be founded on an ethnic, religious, regional or tribal basis.

In the 2012 Constitution of Ba'athist Syria, a licensed party must have:

- at least 50 founding members, aged 25 or over,
- who have been Syrian nationals for more than 10 years,
- are not members of any other party, Syrian or non-Syrian.

=== Contemporary ===
Since the fall of the Assad regime, there has not yet been any legislation for political parties from the People's Assembly of Syria or the Syrian transitional government, although there have been discussions that president Ahmed al-Sharaa and his advisors are developing a new political party.

== Political parties and organizations ==
=== Pre-2024 registered parties ===
Party	Acronym	Leader or Chairman	Political positions
Popular Front for Change and Liberation
People's Will Party حزب الإرادة الشعبية; Ḥizb al-ʾIrāda aš-Šaʿbiyya	–	Qadri Jamil	Far-left
Syrian Social Nationalist Party – Intifada Wing الحزب السوري القومي الاجتماعي – جناح الانتفاضة al-Ḥizb al-Sūrī al-Qawmī al-'Ijtimā'ī Intifada	SSNP–I	Ali Haidar	Syncretic
Other registered parties (since 2012)
Syrian Revolutionary Left Current	–	–	Far-left
National Coordination Committee for Democratic Change	–	Hassan Abdel Azim	–
Solidarity Party	–	–	–
Arab Democratic Solidarity Party	–	–	–
Syrian Democratic Left Party	–	Mansour al-Atassi	–
National Development Party	–	–	–
Syrian State Building Movement	–	Louay Hussein	–
Democratic Modernity Party	–	–	–
Al-Ansar Party	–	–	–
Democratic Vanguard Party	–	–	–
National Youth for Justice and Development Party الحزب الوطني للشباب من أجل العدالة والتنمية	–	Parwin Ibrahim	–
Syrian National Youth Party حزب الشباب الوطني السوري; Ḥizb ash-Shabāb al-Watanii as-Sūrī	–	Maher Merhej	–
National Initiative for Administration and Change in Syria المبادرة الوطنية للإدارة والتغيير في سوريا al-Mubadarat al-Wataniat Lil'iidarat wal-Taghyir fi Sūrīyā	NIACS	Hassan al-Nouri	Centre to centre-left
Syria Homeland Party	–	–	–
Active in DAANES
Kurdish Future Movement in Syria	–	Mashaal Tammo	Centre
Yekiti Kurdistan Party – Syria	PYKS	Abdul Baki Yousef	Centre
Law–Citizenship–Rights Movement	QMH	Haytham Manna	Centre
Democratic Union Party	PYD	Salih Muslim; Asya Abdullah; Mazloum Abdi	Left-wing
Kurdish Democratic Unity Party	PYDKS	Ismail Omar	Centre-left
Kurdish Democratic Progressive Party	PDPKS	Abd al-Hamid Darwish	Centre-left to centre-right
Syrian National Democratic Alliance	TWDS	Alaedinne Khaled	Left-wing
Honor and Rights Convention	CDR	Meram Dawud	Left-wing
Communist Party of Kurdistan	KKP	Mehmet Baran	Far-left
Syria's Tomorrow Movement	–	Ahmad Jarba	Centre
Marxist–Leninist Communist Party (Turkey)	MLKP	–	Far-left
Democratic Conservative Party	–	Humaydi Daham al-Hadi	Centre-right

=== Formerly exiled parties ===
Party	Acronym	Leader or Chairman	Political positions
Hizb ut-Tahrir حزب التحرير; Ḥizb at-Taḥrīr	HT	Ata Abu Rashta	Far-right Salafi jihadism Islamofascism
Muslim Brotherhood in Syria الإخوان المسلمون في سوريا al-Ikhwan al-Muslimun fi Sūrīyā	–	Mohammad Walid	Right-wing
Syrian Democratic People's Party حزب الشعب الديمقراطي السوري; Ḥizb al-Sha'ab ad-Dīmuqrāṭī al-Suriy	–	Ghias Youn al-Soud	Centre-left
Communist Labour Party حزب العمل الشيوعي; Ḥizb al-ʿAmal aš-Šuyūʿī	–	Fateh Jamous	Far-left
Democratic Socialist Arab Ba'ath Party حزب البعث الديمقراطي العربي الاشتراكي; Ḥizb al-Ba‘th ad-Dīmuqrāṭī al-‘Arabī al-Ishtirākī	–	Ibrahim Makhous	Far-left
Arab Revolutionary Workers Party حزب العمال الثوري العربي; Ḥizb al-'Amal al-Thawriy al-‘Arabī	–	Tariq Abu Al-Hassan	Left-wing
National Democratic Rally التجمع الوطني الديمقراطي at-tajammuʻ al-waţanī ad-dīmūqrāţī		Jamal al-Atassi	Left-wing
Ahrar - Syrian Liberal Party حزب أحرار - الحزب الليبرالي السوري; Hizb Ahrar - al-Hizb al-liybiraliu al-Suwriu		Bassam Al-Kuwatli	Right-wing
Kurdistan Democratic Party of Syria الحزب الديمقراطي الكُردستاني في سوريا al-Ḥizb ad-Dīmuqrāṭī al-Kurdistānī fi Sūrīyā پارتی دیموکراتی کوردستان سووری; Partiya Demokrat a Kurdistanê li Sûriyê	KDPS	Saud Malla	Centre
Assyrian Democratic Organization المنظمة الآثورية الديمقراطية al-Munazamat al-Athuriat ad-Dīymūqrātia ܡܛܟܣܬܐ ܐܬܘܪܝܬܐ ܕܝܡܩܪܛܝܬܐ; Mtakasto Othurayto Demoqrotayto	ADO	Gabriel Moushe Gawrieh	Centre-left
Syriac Union Party حزب الإتحاد السرياني في سوريا; Ḥizb al-Ittiḥād al-Siryanii fi Sūrīyā ܓܒܐ ܕܚܘܝܕܐ ܣܘܪܝܝܐ; Gabo d'Ḥuyodo Suryoyo	SUP	Ishow Gowriye	Left-wing
Democratic Arab Socialist Union الاتحاد الاشتراكي العربي الديمقراطي al-Ittiḥād al-Ishtirākī al-'Arabī ad-Dīmūqrāṭī	ASU	Hassan Abdul Azim	Left-wing
Assyrian Democratic Party الحزب الآشوري الديمقراطي al-Ḥizb al-Ashwry al-Diymuqratiu ܓܒܐ ܐܬܘܪܝܐ ܕܝܡܘܩܪܛܝܐ; Gaba Aṯuraya Demoqrataya	ADP	Ninos Isho	Centre-left
Movement for Justice and Development in Syria حركة العدالة والبناء في سورية; Ḥarakat al-'Idalat wal-Bana'a fi Sūrīyā	MJD	Anas al-Abdah	Centre
National Salvation Front in Syria جبهة الخلاص الوطني في سوريا; Jabhat Al-Khalāṣ Al-Waṭanīy fi Sūrīya	–	Abdul Halim Khaddam	Centre-left
Reform Party of Syria حزب الاصلاح السوري; Ḥizb Al-Iṣlāḥ Al-Sūrīy	–	Farid Ghadry	Centre

== Historical parties ==
=== National Progressive Front ===
Following the fall of the Assad regime in December 2024, the new Syrian caretaker government banned all political parties that were part of the pro-Assad National Progressive Front.

Party	Acronym	Leader or Chairman	Political positions
Arab Socialist Ba'ath Party حزب البعث العربي الاشتراكي; Ḥizb al-Ba‘th al-'Arabī al-Ishtirākī	BAAS	Bashar al-Assad	Far-left
Syrian Social Nationalist Party الحزب السوري القومي الاجتماعي al-Ḥizb al-Sūrī al-Qawmī al-'Ijtimā'ī	SSNP	Fares al-Saad	Syncretic
Arab Socialist Movement حركة الاشتراكيين العرب; Ḥarakat al-Ishtirakiyeen al-'Arab	–	Omar Adnan al-Alawi	Left-wing
Arab Socialist Union Party of Syria حزب الاتحاد الاشتراكي العربي في سورية; Ḥizb al-Ittiḥād al-Ishtirākī al-‘Arabī fi Sūrīyā	ASU	Safwan al-Qudsi	Left-wing
Syrian Communist Party (Bakdash) الحزب الشيوعي السوري al-Ḥizb aš-Šhuyū'ī al-Sūrī	–	Ammar Bakdash	Far-left
Syrian Communist Party (Unified) الحزب الشيوعي السوري (الموحد) al-Ḥizb aš-Šhuyū'ī al-Sūrī (al-Mowahad)	–	Najmuddin al-Kharit	Far-left
Social Democratic Unionists الوحدويون الديمقراطيون الاجتماعيون al-Wahdawiuyun al-Dimukatiyyun al-Ijtima'iyyun	–	–	Centre-left
Socialist Unionist Party حزب الوحدويين الاشتراكيين al-Wahdawiyyun al-Ishtirakiyyun	–	Fayiz Ismail	Left-wing
Democratic Socialist Unionist Party الحزب الوحدوي الاشتراكي الديمقراطي al-Ḥizb al-Wahdawi al-Ishtirākī ad-Dīmuqrāṭī	–	Fadlallah Nasreddin	Left-wing
Arab Democratic Union Party حزب الاتحاد العربي الديمقراطي; Ḥizb al-Ittiḥād al-‘Arabī ad-Dīmuqrāṭī	–	Iyad Ghassan Osman	Left-wing
National Covenant Party حركة العهد الوطني; Ḥaraka al-'ahd al-Waṭani	–	Ghassan Othman	Left-wing

=== Other disbanded parties ===
Party	Acronym	Leader or Chairman	Political positions
Arab Communist Party الحزب الشيوعي العربي al-Ḥizb al-Shuyu'i al-‘Arabī	–	–	Far-left
National Bloc الكتلة الوطنية al-Kutlah al-Waṭaniyya	–	Several	Big tent
National Party حزب الوطني; Ḥizb al-Waṭanī	–	Shukri al-Quwatli	Centre-right
People's Party حزب الشعب; Ḥizb al-Sha'ab	–	Rushdi al-Kikhya	Centre-right
League of Nationalist Action عصبة العمل القومي 'Usbat al-'Amal al-Qawmi	–	Abd al-Razzaq al-Dandashi	Far-right
Arab National Party الحزب القومي العربي al-Ḥizb al-Qawmi al-‘Arabī	–	Zaki al-Arsuzi	Far-right
Arab Ba'ath Movement حركة البعث العربي; Ḥarakat al-Baʽth al-‘Arabī	–	Michel Aflaq; Salah al-Din al-Bitar	Left-wing
Syrian–Lebanese Communist Party الحزب الشيوعي السوري اللبناني al-Ḥizb aš-Šhuyū'ī as-Sūrī al-Lubnānī	–	Khalid Bakdash	Far-left
Syrian Communist Party الحزب الشيوعي السوري al-Ḥizb aš-Šuyūʿī as-Sūrī	–	Khalid Bakdash	Far-left
Arab Liberation Movement حركة التحرر العربي; Ḥarakat at-Taḥrīr al-‘Arabī	–	Adib Shishakli	Centre-right
Socialist Cooperation Party حزب التعاون الاشتراكي; Ḥizb al-Ta'awun al-Ishtirākī	–	Faisal Hekmat Al-Asali	Centre-left

== See also ==
- Politics of Syria
- Lists of political parties
