= List of members of the People's Assembly (Syria), 2012–2016 =

This is a list of members elected to the 1st People's Assembly, following the 2012 parliamentary election.

== Composition ==
| Party | | Members | | |
| Party | | Elected in 2012 | At dissolution | Difference |
|---|---|---|---|---|
| NPF | Ba'ath Party | 159 / 250 (64%) | 159 / 250 (64%) | Steady |
| NPF | Arab Socialist Union Party | 4 / 250 (2%) | 4 / 250 (2%) | Steady |
| NPF | Communist (Unified) | 3 / 250 (1%) | 3 / 250 (1%) | Steady |
| NPF | Communist (Bakdash) | 2 / 250 (0.8%) | 2 / 250 (0.8%) | Steady |
| NPF | Socialist Unionist Party | 2 / 250 (0.8%) | 2 / 250 (0.8%) | Steady |
| NPF | Arab Socialist Movement | 2 / 250 (0.8%) | 2 / 250 (0.8%) | Steady |
| NPF | Democratic Socialist Unionist Party | 2 / 250 (0.8%) | 1 / 250 (0.4%) | ▼1 |
| NPF | Arab Democratic Union Party | 1 / 250 (0.4%) | 1 / 250 (0.4%) | Steady |
| NPF | National Covenant Party | 1 / 250 (0.4%) | 1 / 250 (0.4%) | Steady |
| PFCL | Syrian Social Nationalist Party | 6 / 250 (2%) | 6 / 250 (2%) | Steady |
| PFCL | People's Will Party | 1 / 250 (0.4%) | 1 / 250 (0.4%) | ▼1 |
| Independent | | 66 / 250 (26%) | 68 / 250 (27%) | ▲2 |

== Members ==
| No. | Electoral district | Sector | Name | Party |
|---|---|---|---|---|
| 1 | Damascus | A | Jamal al-Qadri | Ba'ath Party |
| 2 | Damascus | A | Atif al-Zaybaq | Ba'ath Party |
| 3 | Damascus | A | Majda Qteit | Ba'ath Party |
| 4 | Damascus | A | Muhammad Izzat Arabi Katbi | Ba'ath Party |
| 5 | Damascus | A | Muhammad Ammar Saati | Ba'ath Party |
| 6 | Damascus | A | Mona Sukkar | Ba'ath Party |
| 7 | Damascus | A | Wafaa Khalifa | Ba'ath Party |
| 8 | Damascus | A | Sharif Shehadeh | Independent |
| 9 | Damascus | A | Omar Oussi | Independent |
| 10 | Damascus | A | Muhammad Akram al-Ajlani | Independent |
| 11 | Damascus | B | Najm al-Din Shamdin | SSNP |
| 12 | Damascus | B | Ammar Bakdash | Communist (Bakdash) |
| 13 | Damascus | B | Haneen Nimr | Communist (Unified) |
| 14 | Damascus | B | Qadri Jamil | People's Will Party |
| 15 | Damascus | B | Khalil Mashhadia | Ba'ath Party |
| 16 | Damascus | B | Fayez al-Sayegh | Ba'ath Party |
| 17 | Damascus | B | Muhammad Jihad al-Laham | Ba'ath Party |
| 18 | Damascus | B | Muhammad Sobhi Abu al-Shamat | Ba'ath Party |
| 19 | Damascus | B | Muhammad Amer al-Qabbani | Ba'ath Party |
| 20 | Damascus | B | Nader Baira | Ba'ath Party |
| 21 | Damascus | B | Hazar al-Daqr | Ba'ath Party |
| 22 | Damascus | B | Khaled al-Abboud | Socialist Unionist |
| 23 | Damascus | B | Ahmad Kazbari | Independent |
| 24 | Damascus | B | Ahmed Nour al-Din Shallash | Independent |
| 25 | Damascus | B | Samer al-Dibs | Independent |
| 26 | Damascus | B | Maria Saadeh | Independent |
| 27 | Damascus | B | Muhammad Hamsho | Independent |
| 28 | Damascus | B | Wa'el al-Ghabra | Independent |
| 29 | Damascus | B | Youssef Asaad | Independent |
| 30 | Rif Dimashq | A | George Nakhleh | Ba'ath Party |
| 31 | Rif Dimashq | A | Georgina Rizq | Ba'ath Party |
| 32 | Rif Dimashq | A | Raja al-Na'al | Ba'ath Party |
| 33 | Rif Dimashq | A | Ali al-Sheikh | Ba'ath Party |
| 34 | Rif Dimashq | A | Kamal Aqsimi | Ba'ath Party |
| 35 | Rif Dimashq | A | Muhammad Bakhit | Ba'ath Party |
| 36 | Rif Dimashq | A | Mosab al-Halabi | Ba'ath Party |
| 37 | Rif Dimashq | A | Nabil Darwish | Ba'ath Party |
| 38 | Rif Dimashq | A | Nazih Abboud | Ba'ath Party |
| 39 | Rif Dimashq | A | Muhammad Khair al-Nader | Independent |
| 40 | Rif Dimashq | A | Mahmoud Diab | Independent |
| 41 | Rif Dimashq | B | Mustafa Hammoud | DSUP |
| 42 | Rif Dimashq | B | Abdel Aziz Arida | ADUP |
| 43 | Rif Dimashq | B | Khalil Khaled | Ba'ath Party |
| 44 | Rif Dimashq | B | Ziad Sukkari | Ba'ath Party |
| 45 | Rif Dimashq | B | Muhammad al-Saeed | Ba'ath Party |
| 46 | Rif Dimashq | B | Muhammad Abdel Nabi | Ba'ath Party |
| 47 | Rif Dimashq | B | Mustafa Laila | Ba'ath Party |
| 48 | Rif Dimashq | B | Khaled Karbouj | Independent |
| 49 | Aleppo | A | Iman Babelly | Ba'ath Party |
| 50 | Aleppo | A | Kifah Lababidi | Ba'ath Party |
| 51 | Aleppo | A | Muhammad Baha Badinjki | Ba'ath Party |
| 52 | Aleppo | A | Muhammad Abbas Turkmani | Ba'ath Party |
| 53 | Aleppo | A | Najla Hafez | Ba'ath Party |
| 54 | Aleppo | A | Maher Khayyata | Independent |
| 55 | Aleppo | A | Muhammad Anas al-Shami | Independent |
| 56 | Aleppo | A | Abdullah Qairouz | SSNP |
| 57 | Aleppo | A | Jamal Hassani | Ba'ath Party |
| 58 | Aleppo | B | Suhail Farah | Ba'ath Party |
| 59 | Aleppo | B | Abdel Moneim al-Sawa | Ba'ath Party |
| 60 | Aleppo | B | Omar Hallaq | Ba'ath Party |
| 61 | Aleppo | B | Faisal Azouz | Ba'ath Party |
| 62 | Aleppo | B | Muhammad Marwan Ulabi | Ba'ath Party |
| 63 | Aleppo | B | Al Hassan Berri | Independent |
| 64 | Aleppo | B | Butros Murjana | Independent |
| 65 | Aleppo | B | Maher Hajjar | Independent |
| 66 | Aleppo | B | Muhammad Sahrij | Independent |
| 67 | Aleppo | B | Ahmed Jarikh | Independent |
| 68 | Aleppo | B | Bashar Yaziji | Independent |
| 69 | Districts of Aleppo Governorate | A | Jamal al-Din Abdo | People's Will Party |
| 70 | Districts of Aleppo Governorate | A | Ahmad Saleh Ibrahim | Ba'ath Party |
| 71 | Districts of Aleppo Governorate | A | Hassan Khallo | Ba'ath Party |
| 72 | Districts of Aleppo Governorate | A | Hussein Jassim Hamad | Ba'ath Party |
| 73 | Districts of Aleppo Governorate | A | Hussein Hassoun | Ba'ath Party |
| 74 | Districts of Aleppo Governorate | A | Abdullah al-Hamad | Ba'ath Party |
| 75 | Districts of Aleppo Governorate | A | Ali al-Bish | Ba'ath Party |
| 76 | Districts of Aleppo Governorate | A | Ali al-Ali al-Abdo al-Satouf | Ba'ath Party |
| 77 | Districts of Aleppo Governorate | A | Eid al-Khalawi | Ba'ath Party |
| 78 | Districts of Aleppo Governorate | A | Qassem Hassan | Ba'ath Party |
| 79 | Districts of Aleppo Governorate | A | Marai al-Taama | Ba'ath Party |
| 80 | Districts of Aleppo Governorate | A | Mustafa al-Jader | Ba'ath Party |
| 81 | Districts of Aleppo Governorate | A | Maen Assaf | Ba'ath Party |
| 82 | Districts of Aleppo Governorate | A | Aql al-Ibrahim | Independent |
| 83 | Districts of Aleppo Governorate | A | Abdallah al-Shallash | Independent |
| 84 | Districts of Aleppo Governorate | A | Muhammad Khair al-Mashi | Independent |
| 85 | Districts of Aleppo Governorate | A | Fahmi Hassan | Independent |
| 86 | Districts of Aleppo Governorate | A | Mustafa Ammar Kush | Arab Socialist Movement |
| 87 | Districts of Aleppo Governorate | B | Ibrahim al-Haj Muhammad Ali | Ba'ath Party |
| 88 | Districts of Aleppo Governorate | B | Shaheen Naasan | Ba'ath Party |
| 89 | Districts of Aleppo Governorate | B | Shams al-Din al-Shaddad | Ba'ath Party |
| 90 | Districts of Aleppo Governorate | B | Alia Qabbani | Ba'ath Party |
| 91 | Districts of Aleppo Governorate | B | Omar Mahmoud al-Hamdo | Ba'ath Party |
| 92 | Districts of Aleppo Governorate | B | Ikhlas Badawi | Ba'ath Party |
| 93 | Districts of Aleppo Governorate | B | Muhammad Arabo | Ba'ath Party |
| 94 | Districts of Aleppo Governorate | B | Muhammad Fadi al-Quraan | Ba'ath Party |
| 95 | Districts of Aleppo Governorate | B | Abdullah Abdullah | Socialist Unionist |
| 96 | Districts of Aleppo Governorate | B | Ismail al-Hassan al-Rabee | Independent |
| 97 | Districts of Aleppo Governorate | B | Mujib al-Rahman al-Dandan | Independent |
| 98 | Districts of Aleppo Governorate | B | Muhammad Saleh al-Mashi | Independent |
| 99 | Districts of Aleppo Governorate | B | Nasr al-Haj Junaid | Independent |
| 100 | Districts of Aleppo Governorate | B | Ahmad al-Ali al-Hamra | Independent |
| 101 | Homs | A | Umaima Khaddour | Ba'ath Party |
| 102 | Homs | A | Iyad Suleiman | Ba'ath Party |
| 103 | Homs | A | Jamal Rabaa | Ba'ath Party |
| 104 | Homs | A | Raif Ali | Ba'ath Party |
| 105 | Homs | A | Saji Taama | Ba'ath Party |
| 106 | Homs | A | Sanaa Abu Zaid | Ba'ath Party |
| 107 | Homs | A | Shaaban al-Hassan | Ba'ath Party |
| 108 | Homs | A | Fadia Deeb | Ba'ath Party |
| 109 | Homs | A | Muhammad Deeb al-Yousef | Ba'ath Party |
| 110 | Homs | A | Mishaal al-Hamoud | Ba'ath Party |
| 111 | Homs | A | Zuhair Tarraf | Independent |
| 112 | Homs | B | Elias Shahin | SSNP |
| 113 | Homs | B | Maher al-Jajah | Communist (Unified) |
| 114 | Homs | B | Ibrahim al-Mahmoud | Ba'ath Party |
| 115 | Homs | B | Abdulqader al-Jaaour | Ba'ath Party |
| 116 | Homs | B | Abdul-Muti Mishlab | Ba'ath Party |
| 117 | Homs | B | Muhammad al-Shami | Ba'ath Party |
| 118 | Homs | B | Nadia Kseibi | Ba'ath Party |
| 119 | Homs | B | Badee al-Droubi | Independent |
| 120 | Homs | B | Abd al-Aziz al-Mulhim | Independent |
| 121 | Homs | B | Abdo al-Najib | Independent |
| 122 | Homs | B | Muhammad Zuhair Ghannoum | Independent |
| 123 | Homs | B | Wael Mulhem | Independent |
| 124 | Hama | A | Ali al-Sheikh Haidar | SSNP |
| 125 | Hama | A | Nawras Mirza | SSNP |
| 126 | Hama | A | Abd al-Rahman Azkahi | ASU |
| 127 | Hama | A | Bilal Deeb | Ba'ath Party |
| 128 | Hama | A | Hamed Ibrahim | Ba'ath Party |
| 129 | Hama | A | Nizar Musa | Ba'ath Party |
| 130 | Hama | A | Maher Qawarma | Ba'ath Party |
| 131 | Hama | A | Muhammad al-Ghada | Ba'ath Party |
| 132 | Hama | A | Basem Ibrahim | Independent |
| 133 | Hama | A | Abd al-Karim al-Sabsabi | Independent |
| 134 | Hama | A | Ali Rustum | Independent |
| 135 | Hama | A | Ghada Ibrahim | Independent |
| 136 | Hama | A | Yasser al-Bakir | Independent |
| 137 | Hama | B | Akram Khalil | Ba'ath Party |
| 138 | Hama | B | Ayman Malandi | Ba'ath Party |
| 139 | Hama | B | Bashar Junaid | Ba'ath Party |
| 140 | Hama | B | Waris al-Younis | Ba'ath Party |
| 141 | Hama | B | Salam Sanqar | Ba'ath Party |
| 142 | Hama | B | Mohsen Ghazi | Ba'ath Party |
| 143 | Hama | B | Mahmoud Jokhdar | Ba'ath Party |
| 144 | Hama | B | Muhammad Wael Ajneid | National Covenant |
| 145 | Hama | B | Akram Hawash | Independent |
| 146 | Latakia | A | Saadallah Safia | Ba'ath Party |
| 147 | Latakia | A | Sameer al-Khatib | Ba'ath Party |
| 148 | Latakia | A | Ammar al-Assad | Ba'ath Party |
| 149 | Latakia | A | Fayhaa Tarifli | Ba'ath Party |
| 150 | Latakia | A | Muhammad Ajil | Ba'ath Party |
| 151 | Latakia | A | Nadim Mansoura | Ba'ath Party |
| 152 | Latakia | A | Wafaa Maala | Ba'ath Party |
| 153 | Latakia | A | Badih Saqour | Independent |
| 154 | Latakia | A | Fawaz Nassour | Independent |
| 155 | Latakia | B | Iskandar Jarada | Communist (Bakdash) |
| 156 | Latakia | B | Ayham Jreikos | Ba'ath Party |
| 157 | Latakia | B | Ali Muhammad | Ba'ath Party |
| 158 | Latakia | B | Kamel Zantout | Ba'ath Party |
| 159 | Latakia | B | Muhammad Bilal | Ba'ath Party |
| 160 | Latakia | B | Maysaa Saleh | Ba'ath Party |
| 161 | Latakia | B | Nabhan Issa | Ba'ath Party |
| 162 | Latakia | B | Ali Makhlouf | Independent |
| 163 | Idlib | A | Zakwan Asi | DSUP |
| 164 | Idlib | A | Muhammad Muti Mouayyad | ASU |
| 165 | Idlib | A | Ahmad al-Hilal | Ba'ath Party |
| 166 | Idlib | A | Ahmed al-Faraj | Ba'ath Party |
| 167 | Idlib | A | Ahmad al-Mubarak | Ba'ath Party |
| 168 | Idlib | A | Ahmad Qabbani | Ba'ath Party |
| 169 | Idlib | A | Sobhi al-Abdullah | Ba'ath Party |
| 170 | Idlib | A | Abdo Alo | Ba'ath Party |
| 171 | Idlib | A | Fatima Khamis | Ba'ath Party |
| 172 | Idlib | A | Faisal al-Mahmoud | Ba'ath Party |
| 173 | Idlib | A | Ghassan al-Qanatri | Ba'ath Party |
| 174 | Idlib | A | Nahed al-Moallem | Ba'ath Party |
| 175 | Idlib | B | Sawsan Sayed Wahba | SSNP |
| 176 | Idlib | B | Safwan Qarbi | Ba'ath Party |
| 177 | Idlib | B | Abdul Razzaq al-Qatini | Ba'ath Party |
| 178 | Idlib | B | Abd al-Wahid Razzouq | Ba'ath Party |
| 179 | Idlib | B | Muhammad Hussein al-Hussein | Independent |
| 180 | Idlib | B | Muhammad Riad Hasri | Independent |
| 181 | Tartus | A | Basil Issa | Ba'ath Party |
| 182 | Tartus | A | Sameer Jawhara | Ba'ath Party |
| 183 | Tartus | A | Sabah Ahmed | Ba'ath Party |
| 184 | Tartus | A | Muhammad Wahoud | Ba'ath Party |
| 185 | Tartus | A | Maha al-Omar | Ba'ath Party |
| 186 | Tartus | A | Suhail Khadr | Independent |
| 187 | Tartus | B | Rami Saleh | Ba'ath Party |
| 188 | Tartus | B | Tony Hanna | Ba'ath Party |
| 189 | Tartus | B | Issam Khalil | Ba'ath Party |
| 190 | Tartus | B | Youssef Asaad | Ba'ath Party |
| 191 | Tartus | B | Khadr Hussein | Ba'ath Party |
| 192 | Tartus | B | Mahmoud Bilal | Independent |
| 193 | Tartus | B | Ali Nedda | Independent |
| 194 | Raqqa | A | Khader al-Saleh | Ba'ath Party |
| 195 | Raqqa | A | Abdul Hakim al-Musa al-Arif | Ba'ath Party |
| 196 | Raqqa | A | Maha al-Ajeili | Ba'ath Party |
| 197 | Raqqa | A | Khalil al-Kasha | Independent |
| 198 | Raqqa | B | Ahmed al-Humaidi | Ba'ath Party |
| 199 | Raqqa | B | Abdul Aziz al-Essa | Ba'ath Party |
| 200 | Raqqa | B | Imad Muhammad | Independent |
| 201 | Raqqa | B | Qasim al-Matar | Independent |
| 202 | Deir ez-Zor | A | Ibtisam al-Dibs | Ba'ath Party |
| 203 | Deir ez-Zor | A | Burhan al-Abd al-Wahhab | Ba'ath Party |
| 204 | Deir ez-Zor | A | Abd al-Salam al-Dahmoush | Ba'ath Party |
| 205 | Deir ez-Zor | A | Maan al-Abboud | Ba'ath Party |
| 206 | Deir ez-Zor | A | Jassim al-Badr | Independent |
| 207 | Deir ez-Zor | A | Turki al-Zayed al-Mustafa | Ba'ath Party |
| 208 | Deir ez-Zor | A | Muhanna Sheikh Fayyad al-Nasser | Independent |
| 209 | Deir ez-Zor | A | Najm al-Suleiman | Independent |
| 210 | Deir ez-Zor | B | Riyadh al-Abdullah | Arab Socialist Movement |
| 211 | Deir ez-Zor | B | Asaad al-Muhammad | Ba'ath Party |
| 212 | Deir ez-Zor | B | Bandar al-Daif | Ba'ath Party |
| 213 | Deir ez-Zor | B | Dir' al-Dandal | Ba'ath Party |
| 214 | Deir ez-Zor | B | Mujhim al-Sahu | Ba'ath Party |
| 215 | Deir ez-Zor | B | Riyadh al-Issa | Independent |
| 216 | Al-Hasakah | A | Catherine Deeb | ASU |
| 217 | Al-Hasakah | A | Hamed al-Jassim | Ba'ath Party |
| 218 | Al-Hasakah | A | Hammad al-Saud | Ba'ath Party |
| 219 | Al-Hasakah | A | Saeed Elia | Ba'ath Party |
| 220 | Al-Hasakah | A | Sattam al-Dandah | Ba'ath Party |
| 221 | Al-Hasakah | A | Abboud al-Shawakh | Ba'ath Party |
| 222 | Al-Hasakah | A | Adnan Suleiman | Ba'ath Party |
| 223 | Al-Hasakah | A | Alaa al-Din al-Hamad | Independent |
| 224 | Al-Hasakah | B | Abdul Rahman Issa | ASU |
| 225 | Al-Hasakah | B | Hammouda Sabbagh | Ba'ath Party |
| 226 | Al-Hasakah | B | Khaled al-Atiyah | Ba'ath Party |
| 227 | Al-Hasakah | B | Muhammad al-Hilu | Independent |
| 228 | Al-Hasakah | B | Hussein al-Muhammad | Independent |
| 229 | Al-Hasakah | B | Muhammad al-Ta'ee | Independent |
| 230 | Daraa | A | Waleed al-Zoubi | Communist (Unified) |
| 231 | Daraa | A | Mahmoud al-Hariri | Ba'ath Party |
| 232 | Daraa | A | Wafaa al-Awda | Ba'ath Party |
| 233 | Daraa | A | Waleed al-Saleh | Ba'ath Party |
| 234 | Daraa | A | Taiseer al-Jegheini | Independent |
| 235 | Daraa | B | Shukria Mahameed | Ba'ath Party |
| 236 | Daraa | B | Fawaz al-Sharaa | Ba'ath Party |
| 237 | Daraa | B | Faisal al-Khoury | Ba'ath Party |
| 238 | Daraa | B | Nidal al-Fateh | Ba'ath Party |
| 239 | Daraa | B | Muhammad al-Khabi | Independent |
| 240 | Suwayda | A | Arkan al-Shoufi | Ba'ath Party |
| 241 | Suwayda | A | Hammoud Khair | Ba'ath Party |
| 242 | Suwayda | A | Shamikh Salha | Ba'ath Party |
| 243 | Suwayda | A | Yahya Amer | Ba'ath Party |
| 244 | Suwayda | B | Walid Abu Asali | Ba'ath Party |
| 245 | Suwayda | B | Arkan Nasr | Independent |
| 246 | Quneitra | A | Rifaat Hussein | Ba'ath Party |
| 247 | Quneitra | A | Mohieddine Ibrahim | Ba'ath Party |
| 248 | Quneitra | A | Hanaa al-Sayed | Ba'ath Party |
| 249 | Quneitra | B | Saleh al-Tahan al-Naimi | Ba'ath Party |
| 250 | Quneitra | B | Tariq al-Afash | Independent |

== By-elections ==
| Electoral district | Date | Previous incumbent | Party | Winner | Party | Cause |
|---|---|---|---|---|---|---|
| Hama | 1 December 2012 | Nizar Musa | Ba'ath Party | Fadel Warda | Ba'ath Party | Resigned after being appointed governor of Tartus. |
| Idlib | 1 December 2012 | Ghassan al-Qanatri | Ba'ath Party | Mohammed Zaher al-Yousefi | Ba'ath Party | Resigned after being appointed governor of Deir ez-Zor. |
| Districts of Aleppo Governorate | 1 December 2012 | Ali al-Bish | Ba'ath Party | Abdel Wahhab al-Abd al-Hanan | Ba'ath Party | Defection |
| Districts of Aleppo Governorate | 1 December 2012 | Ikhlas Badawi | Ba'ath Party | Muhammad Deeb | Ba'ath Party | Defection |
| Al-Hasakah | 1 December 2012 | Sattam al-Dandah | Ba'ath Party | Saleh al-Huwaija | Ba'ath Party | Resigned after being appointed ambassador to Iraq. |
| Aleppo | 9 February 2013 | Abdullah Qairouz | SSNP | Mustafa Abu Souf | SSNP | Death. |
| Al-Hasakah | 13 July 2013 | Muhammad al-Hilu | Independent | Amira al-Ghanim | Independent | Removed from office by a vote in the People's Assembly. |
| Deir ez-Zor | 2013 | Turki al-Zayed al-Mustafa | Ba'ath Party | Jihad al-Shekheir | Independent | |
| Deir ez-Zor | 7 January 2014 | Mujhim al-Sahu | Ba'ath Party | Sattam al-Dandal | Ba'ath Party | Murdered by ISIS in 2013. |
| Damascus | 16 March 2014 | Wafaa Khalifah | Ba'ath Party | Maha Shbero | Ba'ath Party | Death. |
| Hama | 27 December 2014 | Waris al-Younis | Ba'ath Party | Khader al-Saleh | Ba'ath Party | Assassinated in October 2014. |
| Aleppo | 17 January 2015 | Mohammed Marwan Ulabi | Ba'ath Party | Mohammed Maher al-Muwaqqi | Ba'ath Party | Resigned after being appointed governor of Aleppo. |
| Homs | 11 April 2015 | Mohammed Zuhair Ghannoum | Independent | Saleh Maarouf | Ba'ath Party | |
| Districts of Aleppo Governorate | 9 May 2015 | Abdallah al-Shallash | Independent | Fares Jneidan | Independent | Death. |
| Tartus | 4 July 2015 | Samir Jawhara | Ba'ath Party | Bassem Ahmad | Ba'ath Party | Death. |
| Damascus | 2015 | Nader Baira | Ba'ath Party | Samir al-Jazaerli | Ba'ath Party | Removed by the Assembly, reportedly due to absence from meetings. |
| Damascus | 2015 | Qadri Jamil | People's Will Party | Tarif Qutrash | Independent | Removed by the Assembly, reportedly due to absence from meetings. |
| Rif Dimashq | 2015 | Mustafa Hammoud | DSUP | Ahmad Ahmad al-Dalati | Independent | Removed by the Assembly, reportedly due to absence from meetings. |
| Homs | 2015 | Abdo al-Najib | Independent | Ziad al-Talib | Independent | Removed by the Assembly, reportedly due to absence from meetings. |
| Districts of Aleppo Governorate | 2015 | Mohammed Arabo | Ba'ath Party | Omar al-Aroub | Ba'ath Party | Removed by the Assembly, reportedly due to absence from meetings. |
| Districts of Aleppo Governorate | 2015 | Mohammed Fadi al-Quraan | Ba'ath Party | Abd al-Razzaq Barakat | Ba'ath Party | Removed by the Assembly, reportedly due to absence from meetings. |
| Raqqa | 2015 | Imad Mohammed | Independent | Faisal Haji Omar | Independent | Removed by the Assembly, reportedly due to absence from meetings. |
| Al-Hasakah | 2015 | Saeed Elia | Ba'ath Party | Nidal Eshu | Ba'ath Party | Removed by the Assembly, reportedly due to absence from meetings. |
| Daraa | 2015 | Taiseer al-Jegheini | Independent | Ali al-Ghazali | Independent | Removed by the Assembly, reportedly due to absence from meetings. |
| Quneitra | 2015 | Saleh al-Tahan al-Naimi | Ba'ath Party | Mohammed al-Afish | Ba'ath Party | Removed by the Assembly, reportedly due to absence from meetings. |
| Idlib | 14 November 2015 | Abdo Alo | Ba'ath Party | Khaled al-Daher | Ba'ath Party | Removed by the Assembly. |

== See also ==
- Parliament of Syria
- Elections in Syria
- Politics of Syria
