= Maher Hajjar =

Maher Abd Al-Hafiz Hajjar (born 1968) is a Syrian politician, MP for Aleppo for the opposition People's Will Party and a candidate for the 2014 Syrian presidential election.

Hajjar was born in Aleppo in 1968 into a prominent Sunni Muslim family of religious teachers. He graduated from Aleppo University with a diploma in Linguistic Studies. He joined the Syrian Communist Party in 1984 and when the party split in 2000 he joined Qadri Jamil's newly formed People's Will Party. He formed the party's branch in the city of Aleppo and became secretary of the party's council. He stood as an independent in the 2007 parliamentary election but failed to get elected. He stood again in the 2012 parliamentary election. This election took place during the Syrian Civil War after the Constitution of Syria had been amended to remove reference to the leadership of the Ba'ath Party. He was elected to the People's Council of Syria as one of only 5 of 250 MPs who were not part of the ruling National Progressive Front.

He was nominated as one of only three candidates for the 2014 Syrian presidential election running against President Bashar al-Assad. The armed opposition described it as just an attempt "to give legitimacy" to the election and that Hajjar had been persuaded to stand by the Syrian security services. Given that the Constitution of Syria requires at least 35 MPs to nominate a presidential candidate, nearly all of his nominations must have come from either independents or MPs from the ruling National Progressive Front. After his nomination, the People's Will Party distanced themselves party from Hajjar, claiming that Hajjar was no longer a member of either the party or the Popular Front for Liberation and Change and that "Hajjar represented only himself".
