= Syrian National Youth Party =

Syrian National Youth Party حزب الشباب الوطني السوري
- Leader: Maher Merhej
- Secretary-General: Nabil Merhaj
- Founded: 14 March 2012
- Headquarters: Damascus, Syria
- Ideology: Youth rights
- People's Council: 0 / 250

The Syrian National Youth Party is a political party that was approved on 14 March 2012 following the Syrian constitutional referendum, 2012 that introduced multi party elections into Syria. It describes itself as neither "pro- or anti-government" but says while it "opposes wrongdoing"; it functions "under the umbrella of Syria, the homeland, and President Bashar al-Assad".

It fielded three candidates in Damascus Governorate in the Syrian parliamentary election, 2012, although contested the results, claiming that the vote had been marred by irregularities and fraud. As a result, the party rejected the election results and proclaimed the new parliament illegitimate.

The secretary-general is Nabil Merhaj and the co-founder and spokesman is Maher Mirhej.
