= 2012 Syrian parliamentary election =

- 7 May 2012

All 250 seats in the Parliament of Syria 126 seats needed for a majority
- Registered: 10,118,000
- Turnout: 51.26% (▼4.86pp)
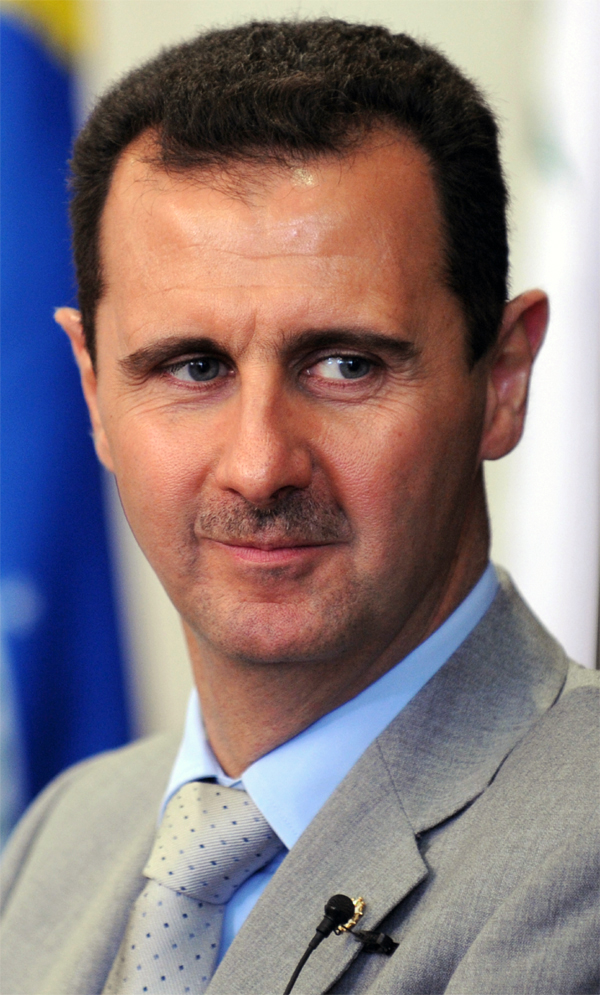

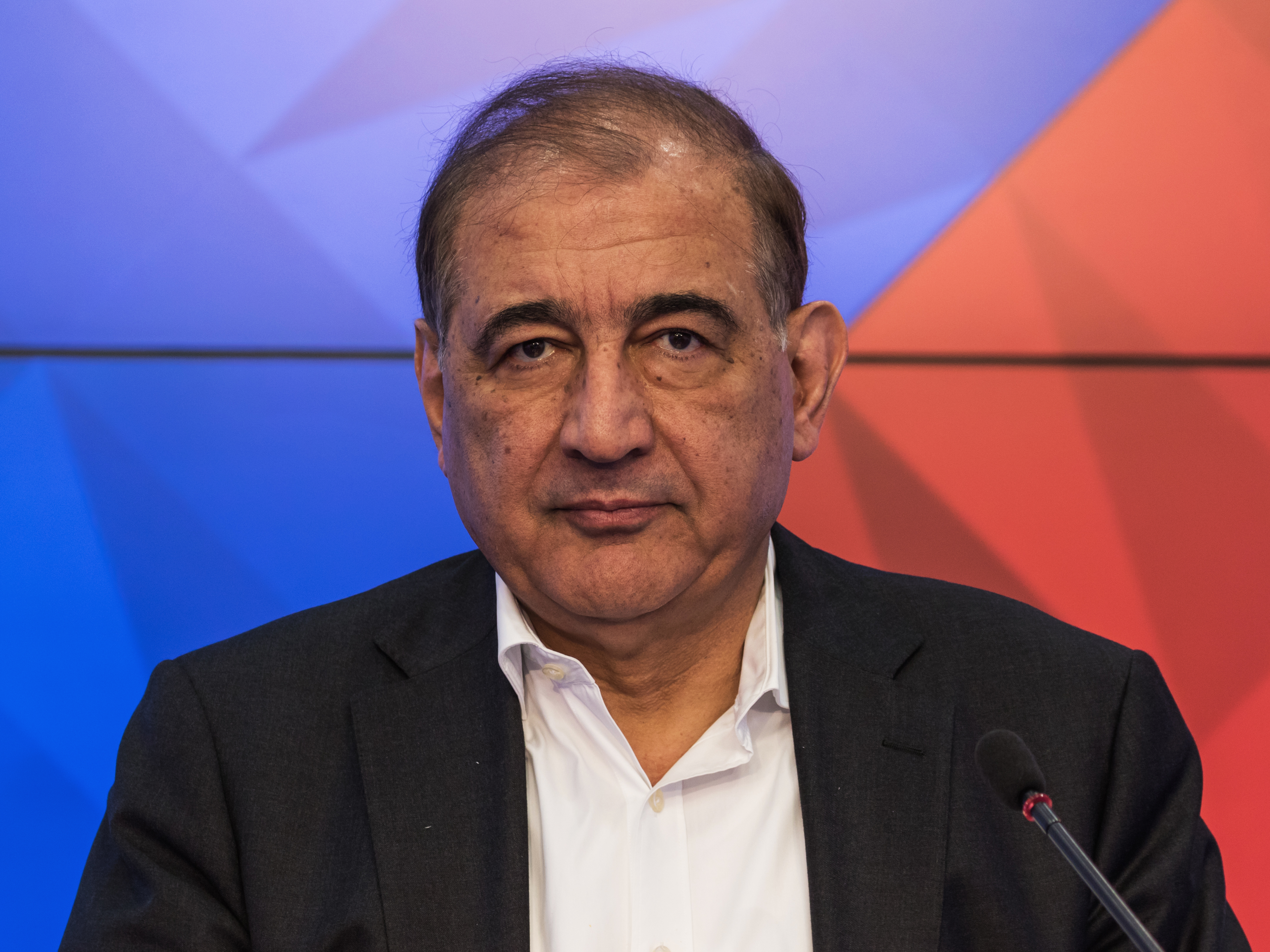
	First party	Second party
Leader	Bashar al-Assad	Qadri Jamil
Party	Ba'ath Party	People's Will Party
Alliance	NPF	PFCL
Last election	169	New
Seats won	168	6
Seat change	▼1	▲6
Speaker before election
Mahmoud al-Abrash
Ba'ath Party
Elected Speaker
Mohammad Jihad al-Laham
Ba'ath Party

Parliamentary elections were held in Syria on 7 May 2012 to elect the members of the Syrian People's Council. The elections followed the approval of a new constitution in a referendum on 26 February 2012.

== Background ==
The elections were postponed from May 2011 to February 2012 and then again, due to the civil war and the referendum on a new constitution. The 250-seat parliament's term expired March 2011 but it was extended in accordance with the country's new constitution. Only a few days before the date announced, peace envoy Kofi Annan said he was awaiting a response from the Syrian leader on "concrete proposals". He had submitted these to him in two rounds of talks in Damascus at the weekend prior to the announcement on the election. On 13 March, President Assad signed decree No.113 setting the election on 7 May 2012. The date of polls was announced on the day when Syrian pro-government forces launched a fresh assault on rebel strongholds in the country’s northwest.

== Regulation ==
The 7 May election was the first to follow the constitution's new outline for political plurality, revoking a clause put in place by Assad's father, Hafez al-Assad, who ruled for nearly 30 years until his death in 2000. The clause stated that Assad's ruling Baath Party was "leader of state and society". Under the new constitution, parties cannot be founded on a religious, tribal, regional, denominational, or profession-related basis or be a branch of or affiliated to a non-Syrian party or political organisation. This would exclude the outlawed Muslim Brotherhood or Kurdish parties seeking regional autonomy. Also, at least half of the members of the assembly should be workers and farmers, as defined by law. In July 2011, the Syrian cabinet endorsed the general elections bill as part of the government's reform program to end months of unrest. The bill stipulates the formation of the Supreme Commission for Elections to manage the election process. Nine newly licensed parties have been formed to challenge the front dominated by the Baath Party, which has ruled since 1972. The elections were conducted through identity card according to the decree No.125 from 2011.

== Campaign ==
By early May 2012, main streets in Damascus were covered with candidates' posters and banners draped over squares. The Financial Times claimed that "the rapid emergence of so many willing prospective MPs from a repressive dictatorship with no history of political activism is just one of many clumsy signs that the vote is orchestrated by the regime to entrench its power". However most of the parties which had candidates elected - the two Communist parties, the Syrian Social Nationalist Party, the Arab Socialist Union and the Social Unionists (see below) - are well established, and have participated in previous parliamentary elections.

The largest opposition group participating in the election was the Popular Front for Change and Liberation, which had 45 candidates, including six in Damascus Governorate, headed by their leader, Qadri Jamil. The Popular Front brought together Jamil's unlicensed People’s Will Party with the Syrian Social Nationalist Party, which was a tolerated party under the National Progressive Front led by Assad's Ba'ath Party.

== Organisation process ==
Due to the ongoing fighting in Syria, questions were raised over the organization of the vote as in the cities of Homs, Hama, Daraa and in the northern province of Idlib are in ongoing war between the rebels and the pro-government forces. On the day of the announcement of the election, Melhem al-Droubi, a member of the Syrian Muslim Brotherhood and the Syrian National Council told Reuters: "Of course we will boycott the elections because they will be fixed. But this is not a main focus for us. What we want is real change with a real presidential election, which Assad would surely lose". However, the government said that this multi-party election was a historic step for comprehensive reform.

On 26 March 2012, SANA, the state-owned news agency reported the parliament asked President Bashar Al-Assad to consider delaying the election so that the comprehensive reforms are consolidated, waiting for the outcome of the comprehensive national dialogue and empowering the licensed parties in light of the new parties law. Louay Hussein, who was jailed for seven years under Hafez al-Assad, said he would boycott the election claiming the government was using the poll as a way to preempt and avoid "possible future negotiations with the opposition forces".

On 3 May 2012, Assistant Interior Minister for Civil Affairs Brigadier General Hassan Jalali said that the Ministry had completed all preparations for the elections. In a statement to SANA, he added that the ministry handed the governors the poll boxes, invisible ink and curtains for invisible rooms and other equipment to distribute them on the 12,152 election centers throughout the country.

While independents and members of licensed political parties declared their candidates some time before the election date, the pro-government Ba'ath party and its partners in the National Progressive Front did not do so until 1 May 2012.

== Conduct ==
Polls opened at 7:00 as Syrian state television showed voters lining up and dropping white ballots in large, plastic boxes. Up to 14.8 million voters were eligible to choose 250 legislators from 7,195 candidates, including 710 women from 12 different political parties, including seven newly formed political parties

It was unclear how extensive voting was throughout the country, especially in opposition area and places that were hard hit by government forces or witnessed clashes between troops and rebels. Activists said many towns observed general strikes and posted videos of blocks along main streets with all shops closed.

The main opposition group that participated, the Popular Front for Change and Liberation, said that there had been "numerous violations" in the election including the banning of candidates' representatives from supervising the elections.

Voting had to be re-conducted at several voting centres across the country due to unspecified election law violations. This caused a delay in the announcement of the election results.

== Results ==
Of 10.118 million people eligible to cast their votes, 5.186 million participated, yielding a voter turnout of 51.26 percent.

With 30 of the 710 contesting women winning seats in the election, the number of women in parliament remained the same as during the previous period.

Party or alliance		Votes	%	Seats	+/–
National Progressive Front	Ba'ath Party			134	0
National Progressive Front	Socialist Unionist Party			18	+12
National Progressive Front	Syrian Communist Party (Bakdash)			8	+3
National Progressive Front	Syrian Communist Party (Faisal)			3	0
National Progressive Front	National Covenant Party			3	0
National Progressive Front	Arab Socialist Union Party			2	–6
National Progressive Front	Total			168	–
Popular Front for Change and Liberation	Syrian Social Nationalist Party			4	+2
Popular Front for Change and Liberation	People's Will Party			1	New
Popular Front for Change and Liberation	Total			5	–
Independents				77	–4
Total				250	–
Total votes		5,186,957	–		
Registered voters/turnout		10,118,000	51.26		
Source: Syrian Parliament, IPU

=== Reactions ===
- United States - The election was criticised as "bordering on ludicrous."

== Aftermath ==
On 25 May 2012, the People's Assembly has held its first session in which members were sworn in, with Mohammad Jihad al-Laham being elected as Speaker.
