= National Initiative for Administration and Change in Syria =

National Initiative for Administration and Change in Syria المبادرة الوطنية للإدارة والتغيير في سوريا
- Secretary General: Hassan al-Nouri
- Founded: 2012
- Headquarters: Damascus, Syria
- Ideology: Anti-imperialism; Economic liberalism Market liberalism Social liberalism Social democracy Secularism
- Political position: Centre to centre-left
- People's Council: 0 / 250

The National Initiative for Administration and Change in Syria (NIACS; Arabic: المبادرة الوطنية للإدارة والتغيير في سوريا) is a Syrian political party. It is led by Hassan al-Nouri, a wealthy businessman and previous minister and member of parliament who stood in the 2014 Syrian presidential election receiving 500,279 votes, 4.3% of the total cast. The party claimed it would tackle corruption, promote an effective economy, and promote change in Syria.

The party touted economic liberalism by pledging to redistribute the wealth of the few ruling families in the country and rebuild its middle class with the slogan "Upgrading Economic Legislation". It was founded in 2012 and hoped to create mechanisms of interaction between corporations and communities within Syria.

NIACS challenged the sole ruler system by the Constitution of Syria. Despite losing the election, al-Nouri said, "The coalition is done for now that corruption has seeped into it, and I am optimistic in achieving victory soon."

NIACS also opposes rebel groups in the Syrian civil war, criticizing the Free Syrian Army and the American-led intervention in Syria. It also criticized Israel's stance.
