= Popular Front for Change and Liberation =

Popular Front for Change and Liberation الجبهة الشعبية للتحرير والتغيير
- President: Qadri Jamil
- Founded: 2011; 15 years ago
- Headquarters: Damascus
- Ideology: Communism; Social nationalism Syrian nationalism Secularism
- Political position: Far-left to Syncretic
- People's Assembly: 0 / 250

The Popular Front for Change and Liberation (Arabic: الجبهة الشعبية للتحرير والتغيير, al-Jabha aš-š‘abiyya li'l-taghayyir wa'l-taḥrīr) is a coalition of Syrian political parties. It briefly participated as the leader of the official political opposition within the People's Assembly of Syria, the state's unicameral parliament. Following the Ba'athist-led regime's decision to conduct the 2016 parliamentary elections during the Geneva talks, the front withdrew its participation.

== History and profile ==
The front was established in August 2011. Coalition leader Qadri Jamil stated that there had been numerous violations in favor of their opponent, the National Progressive Front, in the 2012 parliamentary election.

They have criticized the former ruling Ba'athists on occasion, particularly after the 2012 parliamentary election, when Qadri Jamil questioned the transparency of the vote and considered giving up his seat depending on the government's response, and a member of the SSNP complained about the Ba'ath party's domination of parliament.

Leader of the SSNP-Intifada Ali Haidar announced on May 6 2014 that his party was withdrawing from the Popular Front for Change and Liberation over a difference in positions towards the 2014 presidential election. The SSNP supported the re-election of Bashar al-Assad.

On 10 August 2014, the remaining Popular Front signed a Memorandum of Understanding with the National Coordination Body for Democratic Change in Syria, calling for ″comprehensive grassroots change, which means the transition from the current authoritarian regime to a democratic pluralistic system within a democratic civil State based on the principle of equal citizenship to all Syrians regardless of their ethnic, religious and sectarian identities.″

Following the Ba'athist regime's decision to organize parliamentary elections in 2016 without upholding its previous pledges to seek constitutional amendments and political negotiations, PFCL withdrew its participation from the Syrian parliament and joined the rest of Syrian opposition. The elections were widely perceived as a hardening of government stance and part of its attempts scuttle the Geneva framework.

== Electoral history ==
Election	Seats	+/–	Position
2012	5 / 250	New	▲3rd
2016	0 / 250	▼5	

== Members ==
- People's Will Party
- Syrian Social Nationalist Party – Intifada (Left on 6 May 2014)
