= Hassan al-Nouri =

Syrian politician (born 1960)

His Excellency Hassan al-Nouri
- حسن النوري
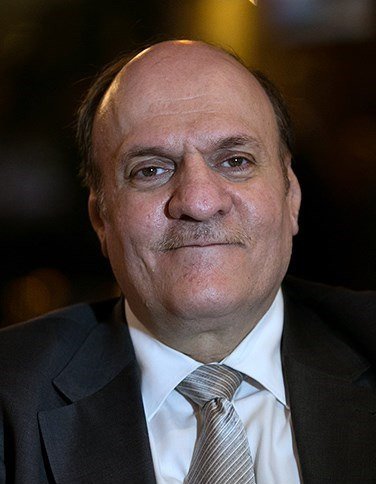
- Hassan al-Nouri in 2014

Minister of Administrative Development
- In office 27 August 2014 – 29 March 2017
- President: Bashar al-Assad
- Prime Minister: Wael al-Halqi; Imad Khamis
- Preceded by: Position established
- Succeeded by: Salam Safaf

Leader of NIACS
- Incumbent
- Assumed office 2012
- Preceded by: Position established

Member of the People's Assembly
- In office 1998–2003
- President: Hafez al-Assad; Bashar al-Assad

Personal details
- Born: September 2, 1960 (age 66) Damascus, Damascus Governorate, Syria
- Party: NIACS
- Education: Damascus University; John F. Kennedy University (PhD)
- Profession: Politician

Hassan al-Nouri (Arabic: حسن النوري) (born September 2, 1960) is a Syrian politician who was a candidate for the Syrian presidential election in June 2014.

== Life and career ==
Nouri was born in Damascus, and obtained a bachelor in Economics and Commerce from the Damascus University in 1982, as well as a PhD in General Management from John F. Kennedy University in 1989. He was the Secretary of the Damascus Chamber of Industry from 1997 to 2000. Nouri lost the 2014 election to Bashar al-Assad, with 4.3% or 500,279 votes, according to SANA (Syrian Arab News Agency).
