= Alexey Alexandrov =

Soviet and Russian scientist (born 1933)

Alexey Aleksandrovich Alexandrov Алексей Александрович Александров
- Born: 1933 (age 92–93)
- Education: Moscow Power Engineering Institute
- Scientific career
- Fields: Thermal engineering

Alexey Aleksandrovich Alexandrov (Russian: Алексей Александрович Александров; born 1933) is a Soviet and Russian scientist and professor in the field of thermal engineering.

== Biography ==
He was born in 1933.

In 1950 he graduated from the Shipbuilding College in Arkhangelsk. In the same year he entered the Moscow Power Engineering Institute. After graduation, he remained in it to work as a teacher at the Department of Theoretical Foundations of Heat Engineering.

He carried out a lot of research work, in 1985 he was awarded the title of professor.

He is the Chairman of the Russian National Committee on the Properties of Water and Water, since 1992 is an Honorary Member of the International Association for the Properties of Steam and Water (IAPS).

In the 1970s, under his leadership, an experimental device was created at the institute to measure sound velocities at temperatures up to 650 K and pressures up to 100 MPa. Equations for the thermophysical properties of water and water vapor were obtained by this device in a large range of state parameters.

In 2002, he was awarded the title of Honored Worker of Science of the Russian Federation.

== Literature ==
- Tables of thermophysical properties of water and water vapor: a reference book / AA Aleksandrov, BA Grigor'ev. - Moscow: MPEI, 2003.
- Practical work on technical thermodynamics: Textbook. manual for universities / VN Zubarev, AA Alexandrov, VS Okhotin. - 3rd ed., Pererab. - M.: Energoatomizdat, 1986.
- Thermal physical properties of water and water vapor / SL Rivkin, AA Aleksandrov. - M.: Energy, 1980.
- Dynamic viscosity and thermal conductivity of water in the critical region. AA Alexandrov, AB Matveev. TVT, 19: 2 (1981).
