= Feroze Mithiborwala =

Indian activist

- Born: Mumbai, Maharashtra, India
- Occupations: Activist columnist political commentator
- Organization: Awami Bharat
- Known for: Anti-imperialist and pro-Palestinian activism
- Movement: Global March to Jerusalem, anti-caste movement

Feroze Mithiborwala is an Indian political activist, columnist, and political commentator. Mithiborwala has taken part in initiatives such as the Global March to Jerusalem and the Gaza Freedom Flotilla.

== Early life and activism ==
According to his personal blog, Mithiborwala is based in Mumbai, India. He has cited the influence of Mahatma Gandhi, B. R. Ambedkar, Jyotirao Phule, as well as leftist ideologies and liberation theology.

== Caste and social justice activism ==
Mithiborwala has described himself as an Ambedkarite and Phuleite. He has participated in campaigns opposing caste-based discrimination, and supported efforts aimed at the elimination of the caste system in Indian society. He has also advocated for alliances among Dalits, Adivasis, Muslims, and other marginalized groups.

== Conspiracy theories ==
According to The Guardian, Mithiborwala argued that terrorist attacks including the 26/11 Mumbai attacks, the 2008 Malegaon blasts, and the 2007 Samjhauta Express bombings were not carried out by Islamist groups, but instead by what he described as "Zionist" or "Hindutva-Zionist" actors, allegedly with involvement of foreign intelligence agencies. He also attended a 2010 conference in Iran questioning the official account of the September 11 attacks, where he repeated similar claims. Commentators in mainstream media have described these views as conspiracy theories that lack credible evidence.
