= Alaeddin Boroujerdi =

Iranian politician

- علاءالدین بروجردی
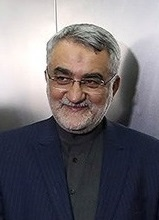

Head of Islamic Consultative Assembly's Commission on Foreign Policy and National Security
- In office 23 August 2005 – 28 June 2018
- Preceded by: Manouchehr Mottaki
- Succeeded by: Heshmatollah Felahatpishe

Member of the Parliament of Iran
- Incumbent
- Assumed office 27 May 2024
- Constituency: Larestan and Khonj
- In office 2 May 2000 – 26 May 2020
- Constituency: Boroujerd and Oshtorinan
- Majority: 53,661 (50.71%)

Personal details
- Born: March 21, 1951 (age 75) Najaf, Kingdom of Iraq
- Website: Official website

Alaeddin Boroujerdi (Persian: علاءالدین بروجردی) (born 21 March 1951, Najaf, Kingdom of Iraq) is a member of the Iranian Parliament since 2024. He was also a member of the Iranian Parliament between years of 2000 to 2020. He is former chairman for the Committee for Foreign Policy and National Security of the Islamic Consultative Assembly of Iran.

== Overview ==
In October 2011, he was arrested for embezzlement but was released after 24 hours thanks to mediation from Ali Larijani. He denied corruption charges. However, he was pressured to resign because of the controversy.

In November 2011, he asked that the British Ambassador to Iran, Dominick John Chilcott, be sent back to the United Kingdom.

He is a supporter of the Supreme Leader Ayatollah Khamenei, and in 2011, he accused Esfandiar Rahim Mashai, Mahmoud Ahmadinejad's chief of staff, of leading a "deviant current" against the regime.

In 2018, Alaeddin Boroujerdi had selected one of the experienced managers of Iran's petrochemical industry, Hesam Khoshbinfar, as the head of his headquarters office.
