= Reform Party of Syria =

Reform Party of Syria حزب الاصلاح السوري
- Leader: Farid Ghadry
- Founded: October 2001 (in Washington, D.C., United States)
- Headquarters: Washington, D.C., United States
- Ideology: Secularism; Reformism
- Political position: Centre

Website
- www.reformsyria.org

The Reform Party of Syria (RPS; Arabic: حزب الاصلاح السوري, romanized: Ḥizb Al-Iṣlāḥ Al-Sūrīy) was a secular Syrian political party and lobby group based in the United States that was active in the mid to late 2000s. Its leader, Farid Ghadry, is a United States citizen and has been described as "controversial" by Al Jazeera. According to the RPS, they were formed as a response to 9/11. It is a member of fellow lobbying organization the Coalition Against Terrorist Media.

An opposition party against the ruling Arab Socialist Ba'ath Party – Syria Region, the Reform Party of Syria advocates for a "New Syria" characterised by democratic and economic reform. The RPS claims that the main factors of increased terrorism are "political despotism, economic deprivation, and social stagnation in the Middle East". The party supports globalization and free trade agreements between Syria and the rest of the Middle East, the banning of weapons of mass destruction, freedom of religion, and peace between Syria and the countries of Israel, Lebanon, Turkey, Jordan and Iraq.

== See also ==
- Iran Syria Policy and Operations Group
- Foundation for Democracy in Iran
