= Farid Ghadry =

Syrian activist

Farid Al-Ghadry
- Born: June 18, 1954 (age 72); Aleppo, Syria
- Education: American University
- Occupations: Co-founder and current president of the Reform Party of Syria

Farid Al-Ghadry (Arabic: فريد الغادري) (born June 18, 1954) is the Syrian-born co-founder and current president of the United States–based Reform Party of Syria, a party lobbying for regime change in Syria. Al-Ghadry has been compared to Ahmed Chalabi, the Iraqi exile who lobbied the US government to liberate his home country from Saddam Hussein.

== Personal life ==
Ghadry was born in Aleppo, Syria, but in 1964 his family immigrated to Beirut, Lebanon, because of political turmoil. There he attended the Maristes Brothers School (Champville – Deek-el-Mehdi). In 1975, the Ghadry family immigrated to the U.S. and settled in the suburbs of Washington, D.C. Ghadry graduated from American University in Washington D.C. in 1979 with a degree in finance and marketing.

Ghadry, because of his father's work, was granted Saudi citizenship. In September 2007, Ghadry's Syrian citizenship was revoked by Syrian president Bashar al-Assad after Ghadry appeared before Israel's Knesset Foreign Affairs and Defense Committee.

Ghadry has four children. He is also known in the U.S. as "Frank Ghadry." He has served on the Board of Trustees of Norwood School in Bethesda, Maryland, and headed the Capital Campaign for Crew at St. Albans and National Cathedral Schools.

== Career ==
Ghadry worked at EG&G Intertech Inc., a subsidiary of EG&G, a Fortune 500 U.S. defense contractor, for two years before starting his own business, International TechGroup Inc., in 1983. This company was Washington-based and produced software for the U.S. Navy to digitize paperwork on aircraft carriers. He sold this business in 1989. In 1990, he began buying antiquated Soviet computers and stripping them for gold plating. Other businesses have included Hannibal's Coffee Company, a chain of coffee shops that went bankrupt in 1996.
