= People's Will Party =

Communist party in Syria

People's Will Party حزب الإرادة الشعبية
- Leader: Collective leadership
- Founded: 2012
- Split from: Syrian Communist Party (Bakdash)
- Headquarters: Damascus, Syria
- Newspaper: Kassioun
- Ideology: Communism; Marxism–Leninism
- Political position: Far-left
- National affiliation: Popular Front for Change and Liberation
- People's Assembly: 0 / 250

Website
- kassioun.org

The People's Will Party (Arabic: حزب الإرادة الشعبية, romanized: Ḥizb al-ʾIrāda aš-Šaʿbiyya) is a Marxist-Leninist party in Syria.

== History ==
In 2000, shortly after the convention of the 9th Congress of the Syrian Communist Party, 80% of the membership of Damascus organization of the party were expelled. As the procedure was widened to cover more party organizations all over Syria, the affected organizations formed the National Committee for the Unity of the Syrian Communists, which re-published the Qassioun newspaper. The new party is not affiliated with the National Progressive Front, which brought together the ruling Ba'ath Party and other legal parties.

In 2012, the communist group formed an officially registered party known as the People's Will Party that convened its 10th Periodical, 1st after registration, Congress in June 2013. The party ran independent candidates in the parliamentary elections in 2003 and 2007 but failed to win any seats. Nonetheless, in the parliamentary elections of 2012, the Popular Front for Change and Liberation, a coalition formed by the PWP, took 5 seats. The Party joined the demonstrations at the start of the 2011 Syrian Crisis, and a number of its activists in Damascus, Homs and Deir ez-Zor were killed by the governmental police and other services, while others were detained or arrested in other Syrian governorates. As the Syrian popular movement turned armed and violent, the PWP continued with its humanitarian aid and mediation efforts in some conflict zones.

Dr. Kadri Jamil, one of the PWP Council Secretaries, was a member of the committee that drafted amendments to the Constitution of Syria in response to the 2011 Syrian protests. The amendments were approved in the Syrian constitutional referendum in 2012 and allowed multiparty elections in Syria.

In 2025, following the fall of the Ba'athist government and the creation of the Syrian caretaker government, the party joined a new organization known as the “Syrian Equal Citizenship Alliance,” or “Tamasuk”. Upon joining Tamasuk, the People's Will Party called for a "unified Syria” under a single state and army, and called for a “just, democratic solution to the Kurdish issue.” It is the first organized political alliance in Syria outside of the government since the fall of the Ba'athist regime.

== Ideology ==
The PWP seeks a comprehensive, radical and democratic change of the regime as a whole, not only the removal of the president. Economically, the party supports a reversal of liberalization reforms that started in 2005 and laid the foundation for the social and political unrest in Syria. It supports the creation of a strong national economy.

== Leadership ==
The People's Will Party follows democratic centralism. Nonetheless, it has no assignment for a secretary-general; instead, the collective leadership of the members of the Central Council that are elected in the General Conference rules the party. The Central Council elects its members of the Syrian Presidium and members of the Secretariat to undertake daily tasks.

== Electoral history ==
People's Assembly
Election	Seats	+/–
2012	1 / 250	▲1
2016	0 / 250	▼1
2020	0 / 250	Steady
