= Louay Hussein =

Syrian politician and writer (1960–2022)

- Born: 1960; Damascus, United Arab Republic
- Died: 10 March 2022 (aged 61–62); Madrid, Spain
- Occupations: Politician, writer

Louay Hussein (1960 – 10 March 2022) was a Syrian writer and opposition activist. He was also the founder of the Building the Syrian State Movement.

== Life ==
Louay Hussein was born in Damascus in 1960 to Alawite parents, and attended its schools until he joined the Department of Philosophy at Damascus University. He was arrested for the first time while he was a university student in 1984. He was released in 1991.

Due to his support for the Daraa protests, he was detained once more on 22 March 2011.

In a video leaked in 2015 he appeared to be praising Bashar al-Assad saying "The shoes of Bashar al-Assad, and anyone in the intelligence service is more honorable than the revolution".

Hussein, died in Madrid after suffering from lung cancer, at the age of 62.

== Bibliography ==
- (2003), Dialogues in the Syrian patriotism
- (2004), Democratic choice in Syria, Louay Hussein interview with Burhan Ghalioun
- (2006), Loss (Tales from an Imaginary Memory of a Real Prisoner)
- (2007), Secularism in the Arab Orient
- (2010), In the elite and the people, Louay Hussein interview with Burhan Ghalioun
