= Qadri Jamil =

Syrian politician

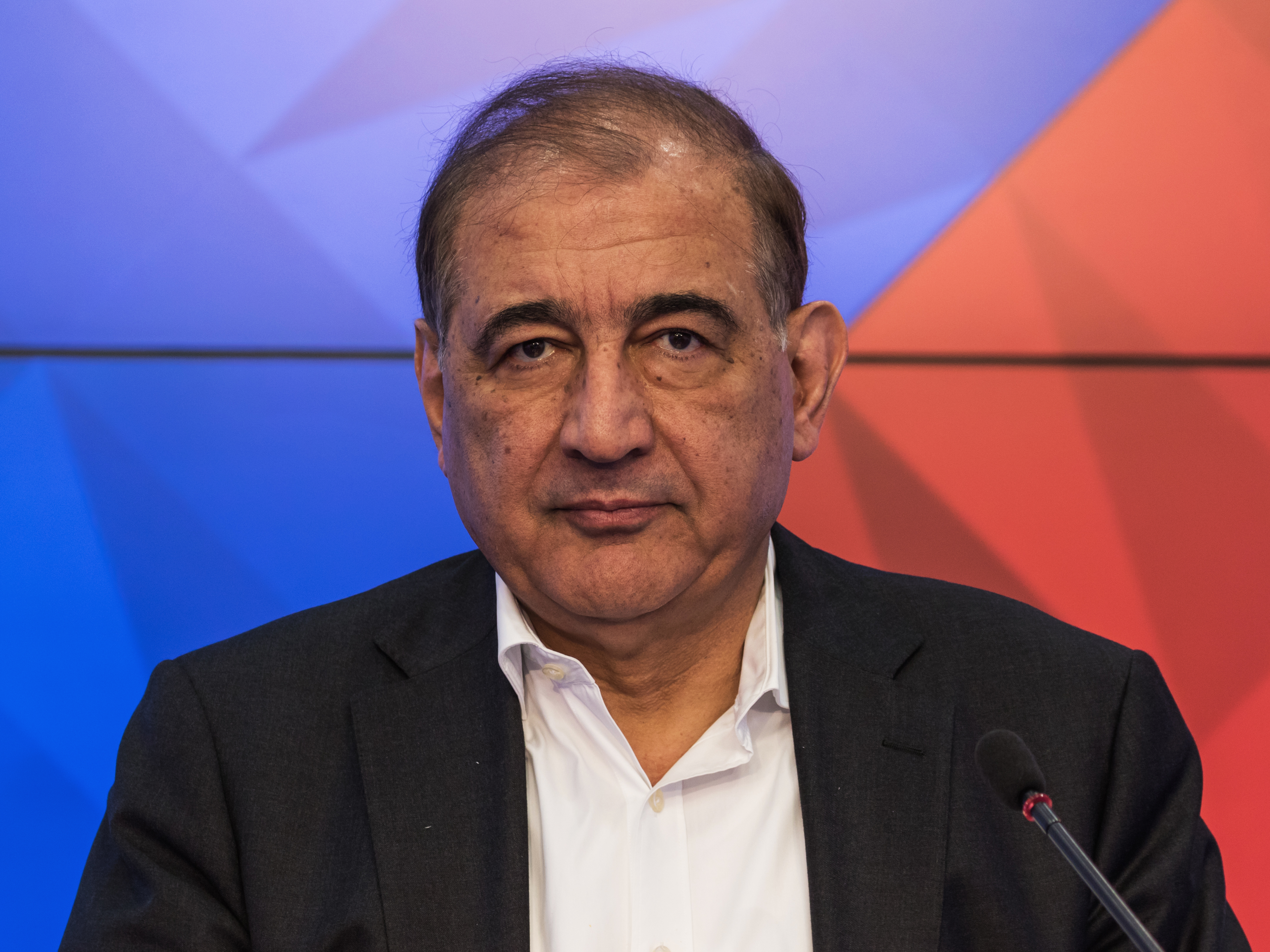
- Jamil in 2017

Deputy Prime Minister for Economic Affairs
- In office 23 June 2012 – 29 October 2013
- President: Bashar al-Assad
- Prime Minister: Riyad Farid Hijab; Wael Nader al-Halqi

Leader of the People's Will Party
- Incumbent
- Assumed office 2012
- Preceded by: Position established

Popular Front for Change and Liberation Leader
- Incumbent
- Assumed office 7 May 2012
- Preceded by: Position established

Personal details
- Born: 12 June 1952 (age 74) Damascus, Syria
- Party: People's Will Party
- Other political affiliations: Syrian Communist Party
- Education: Moscow State University
- Website: kassioun.org

Qadri Jamil (Arabic: قدري جميل) is a Syrian politician, media editor and economist. He is one of the top leaders of the People's Will Party and the Popular Front for Change and Liberation, and a former member of the Syrian government, having been dismissed from the post of deputy prime minister for economic affairs; minister of internal trade and consumer protection on 29 October 2013. During a visit to Russia on 21 August 2012 Jamil said that Bashar al-Assad's resignation might be considered if the opposition agreed to negotiate a peaceful settlement to the Syrian revolution.

== Background ==
Jamil graduated from Moscow State University with a degree in the Science of Economics. He went on to become a professor in the State Institute for Socio-Economic Development Planning in Damascus. Jamil was married to the daughter of Khalid Bakdash, a Syrian politician who was the Secretary-General of the Syrian Communist Party and the first communist to be an elected member of an Arab parliament in 1954. In 2000, shortly after the convention of the 9th Congress of the Syrian Communist Party, Jamil and 80% of the membership of Damascus organization of the Party were expelled. As this illegitimate procedure, as described by those affected, was widened to cover more party organizations all over Syria, Jamil and his comrades formed the National Committee for the Unity of the Syrian Communists, which published the Qassioun (also Kassioun) newspaper. Unlike the two other communist factions, the new communist current was not part of the National Progressive Front which brought together the ruling Ba'ath Party and the other "legal" parties. Qadri Jamil is originally from a Kurdish family (Jamil Pasha, from Diyarbakir), that immigrated to Syria escaping from the Ottoman rulers.

== Political activity ==
It took the communist group more than a decade, actually in 2012, to form and declare an officially registered party known as the People's Will Party, that convened its 10th Periodical, 1st after registration, Congress in June 2013. The party ran independent candidates in the parliamentary elections in 2003 and 2007 but failed to win any seats. Nonetheless, in the parliamentary elections of 2012, the Front took 5 seats. The Party joined the demonstrations at the start of the 2011 Syrian uprising, and a number of its activists in Damascus, Homs and DerEzzour lost their lives at the hands of police and other services, while others were detained or arrested in other Syrian governorates. As the Syrian popular movement turned armed and violent, the PWP continued with its humanitarian aids and mediation efforts in some conflict zones. The PWP says it seeks a comprehensive, radical and democratic change of the government as a whole, not only the removal of President Bashar al-Assad. He called on the government to release all political detainees. He has stated that "The slogan 'the overthrow of the regime' is unpractical, unrealistic and useless", and has advocated a "complete change in the regime ... under the leadership of the President". He described any western interference in Syrian affairs as an "occupation" and said that dialogue was the only way to settle the crisis. Economically, the party called for a reversal of the liberalisation reforms that started in 2005 and for the creation of a strong national economy. Jamil "thanked" Russia for vetoing a UN Security Council Resolution in December 2011 that would have condemned the Syrian government.

Jamil was a member of the committee that drafted amendments to the Constitution of Syria in response to the 2011 Syrian uprising. The amendments were approved in the 2012 Syrian constitutional referendum and allowed multiparty elections in Syria. Following the referendum, Jamil's party joined forces with the unofficially registered Syrian Social Nationalist Party, which had a tolerated faction-party with the same name under the National Progressive Front led by Assad's Ba'ath Party, to form the Popular Front for Change and Liberation . The Front ran 45 candidates in the 2012 Syrian parliamentary election across all 14 governorates, including six in Damascus Governorate, where their list was headed by Jamil. Just before the official announcement of the election results, Jamil denounced them as "forged and manipulated", and said they would not be a starting point for political reform in the country. He called for the elections to be cancelled and the parliament to be dissolved. However, in the first government formed after the elections at 23 June 2012, Jamil was appointed as a Deputy Prime Minister for Economic Affairs; Minister of Internal Trade and Consumer Protection.

In 2012, Jamil joined with the Lebanese Communist Party and a Lebanese journalist and political figure to form a new leftist television channel, al Yassariya ("the Leftist"). As early as 2013, the channel however closed doors, and Jamil said he was going to re-establish the project in Damascus. Jamil was removed from office on 29 October 2013, for leaving the country without prior permission and reportedly meeting with U.S. envoy for Syria Robert Stephen Ford to discuss proposed Geneva peace talks.

During the Syrian civil war, Jamil headed the "Moscow Group", the Russian-supported wing of the Syrian opposition.
