= Constitution of Syria =

Fundamental law of Syria

- Constitutional Declaration of the Syrian Arab Republic (2025) signed by Syrian President Ahmed al-Sharaa

Overview
- Jurisdiction: Syria
- Created: 2 March 2025
- Ratified: 13 March 2025
- Date effective: 13 March 2025
- System: Unitary presidential republic

Government structure
- Branches: Three (executive, legislative and judiciary)
- Head of state: President
- Chambers: Unicameral (People's Assembly)
- Executive: President as head of government
- Judiciary: Supreme Judicial Council, Supreme Constitutional Court
- Federalism: Unitary (See Federalization of Syria)
- First legislature: 12 July 2026
- First executive: 29 March 2025
- First court: 11 July 2026
- Author: Legal Committee for Drafting the Constitutional Declaration
- Supersedes: Constitution of 2012

Syria has had various constitutions, the first being the Syrian Constitution of 1930. A new Constitutional Declaration was adopted on 13 March 2025, replacing the 2012 constitution following the fall of the Assad regime.

== History ==
Timeline of the Syrian constitutions

=== Early constitutions ===
The Syrian Constitution of 1930, drafted by a committee under Ibrahim Hananu, was the founding constitution of the First Syrian Republic. The constitution required the President to be of Muslim faith (article 3). It was replaced by the Constitution of 5 September 1950, which was restored following the Constitution of 10 July 1953 and the Provisional Constitution of the United Arab Republic.

=== Constitutions of Ba'athist Syria ===
Following the 1963 Syrian coup d'état, the first decision of the "Revolution Command Council," chaired by Lu'ay al-Atassi, was to suspend the provisional constitution of the United Arab Republic, arrest President Nazim al-Qudsi and Prime Minister Khalid al-Azm, and impose a state of emergency that lasted for 48 years until it was lifted in April 2011. A new Provisional Constitution was adopted on 25 April 1964 which itself was replaced by the Provisional Constitution of 1 May 1969.

==== Constitution of 1973 ====
A new constitution was adopted on 13 March 1973 and was in use until 27 February 2012. The constitution officially entrenched the power of the Arab Socialist Ba'ath Party, with its 8th article describing the party as "the leading party in the society and the state", outlining its political system as a one-party state under the Ba'ath party. The constitution has been amended twice. Article 6 was amended in 1981. The constitution was last amended in 2000 when the minimum age of the President was lowered from 40 to 34.

==== Constitution of 2012 ====
Following the 2011 Syrian revolution, the Syrian government drafted a new constitution and put it to a referendum on 26 February 2012, which was unmonitored by international observers. The modifications in the constitution were cosmetic and part of the Ba'athist government's response to the nationwide protests. Since the move monopolized the power of the Government of Syria and was drafted without consultation outside loyalist circles, Syrian opposition and revolutionary parties boycotted the referendum, resulting in very low participation as per government data. With 90,86% in favor and a 57.41% turnout, the referendum resulted in the adoption of the new constitution, which came into force on 27 February 2012.

On 23 January 2017, Russian diplomats presented a draft constitution for a new Syrian constitution which was rejected by the opposition delegates.

The constitution ceased to be in effect after the fall of the Assad regime on 8 December 2024 and was officially phased out on 29 January 2025.

=== Post-Ba'athist Syria Constitution ===
After the fall of the Assad regime, Syria TV reported on 29 December 2024, that preparations were underway for a National Conference with 1,200 representatives, though the date had not yet been decided. During the conference, a constitutional drafting committee would be announced, the People's Assembly of Syria and all armed factions, including Hay'at Tahrir al-Sham, would be dissolved, and a new national army would be restructured. Later that day, Syrian de facto leader Ahmed al-Sharaa stated that elections could take up to 4 years to be organized, with the need to conduct a census beforehand.

==== Constitutional Declaration of the Syrian Arab Republic ====
On 29 January 2025, during the Syrian Revolution Victory Conference, Hassan Abdel Ghani, spokesman for the Military Operations Command, announced the dissolution of the 2012 Syrian constitution. President Ahmed al-Sharaa stated he would issue a "constitutional declaration" to serve as a "legal reference" pending a new constitution.

On 12 February 2025, the transitional government announced the formation of a preparatory committee for the then upcoming Syrian National Dialogue Conference, comprising seven members: Hassan al-Daghim, Maher Alloush, Mohammed Mastet, Youssef al-Hijr, Mustafa al-Mousa, Hind Kabawat, and Houda Atassi. On 2 March 2025, President Al-Sharaa declared the establishment of a committee tasked with drafting a constitutional declaration to guide the country's transition following the ousting of the Assad regime. On 13 March 2025, President Al-Sharaa ratified the constitutional declaration, which will be valid for five years.

The constitution sets a presidential system, without the position of prime minister with the executive power at the hands of the president who appoints the ministers. This constitution enshrines Islamic law as the main source of jurisprudence while preserving freedoms of opinion and expression. The People's Assembly has been established to serve as an interim parliament during the five-year transition, overseeing the drafting of a new permanent constitution. The president appoints one third of the members of the People's Assembly as well as the judges of the constitutional court without the need to receive a confirmation from the parliament.
