= 2012 Syrian constitutional referendum =

- 26 February 2012

Results
Choice	Votes	%
Yes	7,490,319	90.86%
No	753,208	9.14%
Valid votes	8,243,527	98.41%
Invalid or blank votes	132,920	1.59%
Total votes	8,376,447	100.00%
Registered voters/turnout	14,589,954	57.41%

A constitutional referendum was held in Syria on 26 February 2012. In response to the Syrian Civil War, President Bashar al-Assad ordered a new constitution to be drafted. The referendum was not monitored by foreign observers.

== Background ==
The new constitution set a limit of two seven-year terms for future presidents and also removed Article 8 of the constitution of Syria, which stated that "the Arab Socialist Ba'ath Party leads the state and society."

== Issues ==
=== Political parties ===
The new constitution removed the de jure Ba'ath Party monopoly over the political life of Syria. The text also prohibits the formation of political parties on an ethnic, religious, regional or tribal basis. However, any planned political party must get the government's permission and approval before it is to be formed.

=== Presidency ===
According to the new constitution, presidential elections were to be held every seven years. The elections were intended to be contested by several candidates, unlike the previous form of election in which a single candidate was approved or rejected.

The conditions required to be candidate at the presidential election are the following:

1. A candidate must have the support of 35 members of the parliament
2. A candidate must be 40 years old or more
3. A candidate must have lived in Syria for 10 years before the election
4. A candidate must be Syrian by birth, of parents who are Syrians by birth
5. A candidate must not be married to a non-Syrian spouse

=== Economy ===
Syria would no longer be a planned socialist economy but will focus on the principle of developing public and private economy in order to boost the national income and to develop the production to create jobs and raise the standard of living. The constitution states that development is the goal of all economics of policy and that consumers and producers are protected. Private property is protected and can only be confiscated for necessities of war and disasters and only for a fair compensation.

=== Religion and culture ===
The new constitution says that the state respects and protects all religions, but reaffirms that Islamic jurisprudence is a major source of inspiration, as in the previous constitution. The new constitution states that scientific research is supported by the state and the freedom of scientific research, artistic creation, literature and cultural creativity are protected.

=== Rights and freedom ===
The constitution forbade any discrimination on the grounds of sex, origin, religion or language. National unity, integrity and military service are considered a "sacred duty" while freedom is considered a sacred right.

== Campaign ==
In the weeks leading up to the referendum, public television hosted discussions about the new constitution and informed citizens how to vote.

The main foreign-based opposition group, the SNC, opposed the proposed constitution and called for a boycott. The Syrian opposition in exile described the new constitution as fraudulent and the referendum as a farce. It pointed out that the Syrian government had never respected the old constitution, which enshrines freedom of speech and peaceful demonstrations and bans torture.

== Conduct ==
Due to the ongoing fighting in Syria, questions were raised over the organization of the vote in the cities of Homs, Hama, Daraa and in the northern province of Idlib, which were held by the rebellion. Voters present in these areas were not able to take part in the referendum unless they traveled to government-held areas.

14.6 million Syrians were eligible to vote, in 14,185 polling stations which were open from 7:00-19:00. Multiple polling stations were set up in each district and neighborhood of central Damascus.

At midday, the interior ministry announced that the referendum was going smoothly in most of the provinces. The interior minister, Maj. Gen. Mohammad Ibrahim al-Shaar, announced that the turnout was "high except in some areas despite threats and intimidation from armed groups." He called the participation in central Damascus "remarkable."

Canadian-based Global News reported that the turnout was high in pro-Assad neighbourhoods or areas with a high security presence, but made note that areas which have held anti-government protests had a very low turnout. They also suggested that though a portion of the voters were opposed to the government, there was also a belief that the referendum would be "a step in the right direction." It also suggested that in pro-government neighbourhood there was pressure to vote and pressure to boycott the vote in anti-government neighbourhoods.

President Bashar al-Assad voted with his wife Asma at a voting centre located at the headquarters of the national television where he was cheered by their employees. A crowd of Assad supporters in Damascus showed their support for the referendum.

== Results ==
With a voter turnout of 57.4% and 89.4% voting in favour, the new constitution was adopted. President Al-Assad signed the new constitution into force on 27 February 2012.

Choice	Votes	%
For	7,490,319	90.86
Against	753,208	9.14
Total	8,243,527	100.00
Valid votes	8,243,527	98.41
Invalid/blank votes	132,920	1.59
Total votes	8,376,447	100.00
Registered voters/turnout	14,589,954	57.41
Source: Direct Democracy

=== International reactions ===
- Russia - A Ministry of Foreign Affairs statement welcomed the referendum outcome, saying that the referendum had shown popular support of the government’s reform programme and denied legitimacy to the Syrian opposition, which tried but failed to persuade the people to boycott the vote. Russia also urged the Syrian sides to renounce violence and enter into a dialogue without preconditions.
