= First Mustafa Mero government =

2000–2001 Syrian government

- 86th government of the Syrian Arab Republic
- Date formed: 13 March 2000
- Date dissolved: 13 December 2001

People and organisations
- President: Hafez al-Assad (until 2001); Bashar al-Assad (from 2000)
- Prime Minister: Mustafa Mero
- Prime Minister's history: al-Zoubi I
- Deputy Prime Ministers: Mustafa Tlass; Muhammad Naji al-Otari; Khalid Raad
- Member parties: ▌Ba'ath; ▌ASU; ▌SCP; ▌ASM; ▌SUP
- Status in legislature: Majority coalition government

History
- Legislature term: 7th People's Assembly
- Predecessor: al-Zoubi II
- Successor: Mero II

The First Mustafa Mero government was the eighty-sixth government since the establishment of the modern Syrian state in 1918.Formed on 13 March 2000 by Decree No. 8, it was the tenth government to serve under the presidency of Hafez al-Assad. The government was headed by Mustafa Mero and remained in office until 13 December 2001.

The government was formed during the final months of Hafez al-Assad's presidency and oversaw the transition period following his death on 10 June 2000 and the accession of his son Bashar al-Assad to the presidency. It was responsible for maintaining continuity in state institutions while adapting to the early phase of the new presidency.

During its tenure, the government continued the political and administrative framework established under the Arab Socialist Ba'ath Party and managed the initial stages of Bashar al-Assad's rule, including early discussions of reform and modernisation within the Syrian state. The government remained in office until 13 December 2001, when it was succeeded by a second government headed by Mustafa Miro.

== Composition ==
| Portfolio | Minister | Took office | Left office | Party |
|---|---|---|---|---|
| Prime Minister | Mustafa Mero | 13 March 2000 | 13 December 2001 | Ba'ath Party |
| Deputy Prime Minister | Mustafa Tlass | 11 March 1984 | 13 December 2001 | Ba'ath Party |
| Deputy Prime Minister for Services Affairs | Muhammad Naji al-Otari | 13 March 2000 | 13 December 2001 | Ba'ath Party |
| Deputy Prime Minister for Economical Affairs | Khalid Raad | 13 March 2000 | 13 December 2001 | |
| Minister of Defense | Mustafa Tlass | 22 March 1972 | 13 December 2001 | Ba'ath Party |
| Minister of Foreign Affairs | Farouk al-Sharaa | 11 March 1984 | 13 December 2001 | Ba'ath Party |
| Minister of Interior | Muhammad Harba | 1 November 1987 | 13 December 2001 | |
| Minister of Economy and Foreign Trade | Muhammad al-Amadi | 8 April 1985 | 13 December 2001 | Independent |
| Minister of State for Foreign Affairs | Nasser Qaddour | 1 November 1987 | 13 December 2001 | |
| Minister of Finance | Khalid al-Mahaini | 1 November 1987 | 13 December 2001 | |
| Minister of Health | Muhammad Iyad al-Shatti | 1 November 1987 | 13 December 2001 | |
| Minister of Agriculture and Agrarian Reform | Asaad Mustafa | 29 June 1992 | 13 December 2001 | |
| Minister of Transportation | Radwan Martini | 29 June 1992 | 13 December 2001 | |
| Minister of Housing and Utilities | Hussam al-Safadi | 29 June 1992 | 13 December 2001 | |
| Minister of Electricity | Munib Saem al-Dahr | 13 March 2000 | 13 December 2001 | |
| Minister of Endowments | Muhammad Ziyada | 13 March 2000 | 13 December 2001 | |
| Minister of Oil and Mineral Resources | Muhammad Maher Jamal | 13 March 2000 | 13 December 2001 | |
| Minister of Local Administration | Salam al-Yassin | 13 March 2000 | 13 December 2001 | |
| Minister of Presidential Affairs | Haitham Duweihi | 13 March 2000 | 13 December 2001 | |
| Minister of Construction and Reconstruction | Nihad Mishantat | 13 March 2000 | 13 December 2001 | |
| Minister of Culture | Maha Qannut | 13 March 2000 | 13 December 2001 | |
| Minister of State | Hassan al-Nouri | 13 March 2000 | 13 December 2001 | |
| Minister of State | Ihsan Shureitih | 13 March 2000 | 13 December 2001 | |
| Minister of State | Makhoul Abu Hamida | 13 March 2000 | 13 December 2001 | |
| Minister of Tourism | Qasim Muqdad | 13 March 2000 | 13 December 2001 | |
| Minister of Education | Mahmoud al-Sayyed | 13 March 2000 | 13 December 2001 | |
| Minister of State for Environmental Affairs | Farouk al-Adeli | 13 March 2000 | 13 December 2001 | |
| Minister of Justice | Muhammad Nabil al-Khatib | 13 March 2000 | 13 December 2001 | |
| Minister of State for Planning Affairs | Issam Al Zaim | 13 March 2000 | 13 December 2001 | |
| Minister of Higher Education | Hassan Risheh | 13 March 2000 | 13 December 2001 | |
| Minister of Transport | Makram Ubeid | 13 March 2000 | 13 December 2001 | Independent |
| Minister of State for Council of Ministers Affairs | Muhammad Mufdi Seifo | 13 March 2000 | 13 December 2001 | |
| Minister of Social Affairs and Labor | Bari'a al-Qudsi | 13 March 2000 | 13 December 2001 | |
| Minister of Supply and Internal Trade | Usama Maa' al-Barid | 13 March 2000 | 13 December 2001 | |
| Minister of Industry | Ahmad Hammo | 13 March 2000 | 13 December 2001 | |
| Minister of Irrigation | Taha al-Atrash | 13 March 2000 | 13 December 2001 | |

== See also ==
- Council of Ministers (Syria)
- List of Syrian governments
- Government ministries of Syria
- List of prime ministers of Syria
