= Ghiath Diab =

Syrian politician

- غياث دياب

Deputy Minister of Energy for Oil Affairs
- Incumbent
- Assumed office 1 June 2025
- President: Ahmed al-Sharaa
- Minister: Mohammed al-Bashir

Minister of Oil and Mineral Resources
- In office December 2024 – 29 March 2025
- President: Ahmed al-Sharaa (Note: As de facto leader until 29 January 2025.)
- Prime Minister: Mohammed al-Bashir
- Preceded by: Firas Hassan Kaddour
- Succeeded by: Position abolished Mohammed al-Bashir (as Minister of Energy)

Personal details
- Born: Damascus, Syria
- Citizenship: Syria; Palestine
- Education: Damascus University (ME)

Ghiath Fawzi Diab (Note: Arabic: غياث فوزي دياب) is a Syrian engineer and politician who served as the Minister of Oil and Mineral Resources between December 2024 and March 2025 in the Syrian caretaker government that was formed after the fall of the Assad regime.

Diab is the first Palestinian Syrian to hold a ministerial position in Syria's History, and, upon the establishment of the Syrian transitional government, was succeeded by Mohammed al-Bashir as Minister of Energy, a ministry formed as a merger of three ministries, including the Ministry of Oil and Mineral Resources.

== Early life and education ==
He was born in Qadam, Damascus to Palestinian Syrian parents, and holds both Syrian and Palestinian citizenship.

He holds a master's degree in petroleum engineering from Damascus University, and completed his postgraduate studies in energy and natural resource management abroad. He also served as director of the Oil Exploration Department in Syria.

== Career ==
=== Minister of Oil and Mineral Resources (2024–2025) ===
In December 2024, after the fall of the Assad regime, he was appointed Minister of Oil and Mineral Resources by the Syrian caretaker government.

In a press statement on 30 December 2024, Diab stated that the Syrian oil sector faces several challenges, including oil wells that remain outside the administration of the government, along with sanctions on Syria, the latter of which he said had caused scarcity and instability after the Assad regime's collapse.

In an interview with CNBC Arabia on 12 January 2025 about Syria's petroleum industry, he said that Syria would begin oil and gas exploration and drilling in less than a month, after completing necessary procedures. He expressed his desire to increase fuel production, turning Syria into an oil exporter, and to increase the amount of pipelines between countries via Syria. He also stated that Homs Refinery was operating at around 40-50% of its design capacity, and the Baniyas Refinery was possibly at 60%. He emphasized the importance of international and foreign partnerships being able to access modern technologies. In regards to privatization, Diab said that the private sector could be allowed to import petroleum products, adding that this would be available to all international and commercial entities. He concluded by saying that "We have begun importing approximately three tankers with a capacity of 15,000 tons. We are offering tenders to import oil to countries or companies, and we will contract with the best".

On 29 March 2025, Diab's ministry, alongside the Ministry of Electricity and the Ministry of Water Resources, were merged into the newly-formed Ministry of Energy, led by Mohammed al-Bashir.

=== Deputy Minister of Energy for Oil Affairs (2025–present) ===
On 1 June 2025, he was appointed Deputy Minister of Energy for Oil Affairs via Presidential Decree No. 33 of 2025.
