= Energy in Syria =

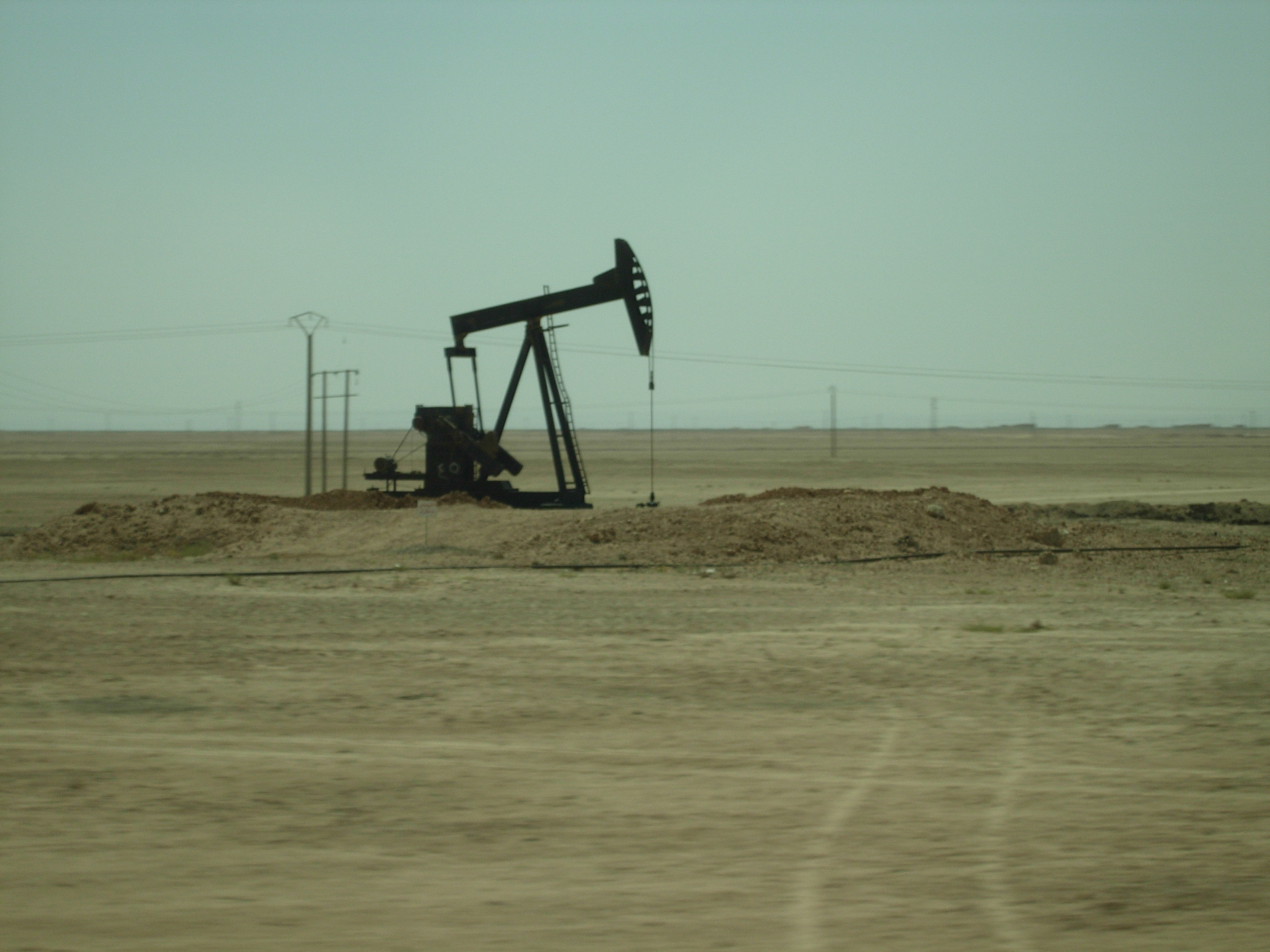
Pumpjack

Energy in Syria is mostly based on oil and gas. Some energy infrastructure was damaged by the Syrian civil war. There is high reliance on fossil fuels for energy in Syria, and electricity demand is projected to increase by 2030, especially for industry activity such as automation. However, conflict in Syria has caused electricity generation to decrease by nearly 40% in recent years due to plant destruction and fuel shortages. Electricity access in daily life for Syrians has also been altered due to conflict. Electricity to residents of Syria is largely provided by private diesel generators, which is costly and limited in hours of use. Conflict has increased household electricity expenditures while also decreasing household income. Some households have since turned to solar energy as a supplementary source of energy, though high costs limit widespread adoption.

== Overview ==
In 2021, only oil accounted for 68.2% of Syria's total energy supply. Natural gas accounted for 30.9% and hydropower accounted for 0.7%. From 2000 to 2021, 22 Metric tons of CO_{2} has been emitted, which contributes to 0.07% of total energy emissions and a 41% decrease in CO_{2} emissions. Electricity consumption per capita has decreased by 43% between this period, with a 4.5% share of power generation on renewables in 2021 alone.

Energy in Syria
| | Capita | Prim. energy | Production | Export | Electricity | CO_{2}-emission |
| | Million | TWh | TWh | TWh | TWh | Mt |
|---|---|---|---|---|---|---|
| 2004 | 18.58 | 214 | 343 | 129 | 24.5 | 47.8 |
| 2007 | 19.89 | 228 | 283 | 52 | 29.5 | 53.7 |
| 2008 | 21.23 | 229 | 273 | 43 | 31.3 | 54.4 |
| 2009 | 21.09 | 262 | 274 | 33 | 31.3 | 59.8 |
| 2010 | 20.45 | 253 | 322 | 51 | 38.96 | 57.76 |
| 2012R | 22.40 | 175 | 157 | 24.2 | 26.2 | 40.1 |
| 2013 | 22.85 | 150 | 88 | 68.3 | 21.8 | 33.5 |
| Change 2004-10 | 10.1% | 17.8% | -6.3% | -60.5% | 59.2% | 20.9% |
Mtoe = 11.63 TWh. Prim. energy includes energy losses 2012R = CO_{2} calculation criteria changed, numbers updated

While the supply, production, and emission of coal remains insignificant, Natural gas has decreased by 42% in terms of production within 2000–2021.

== Electricity ==
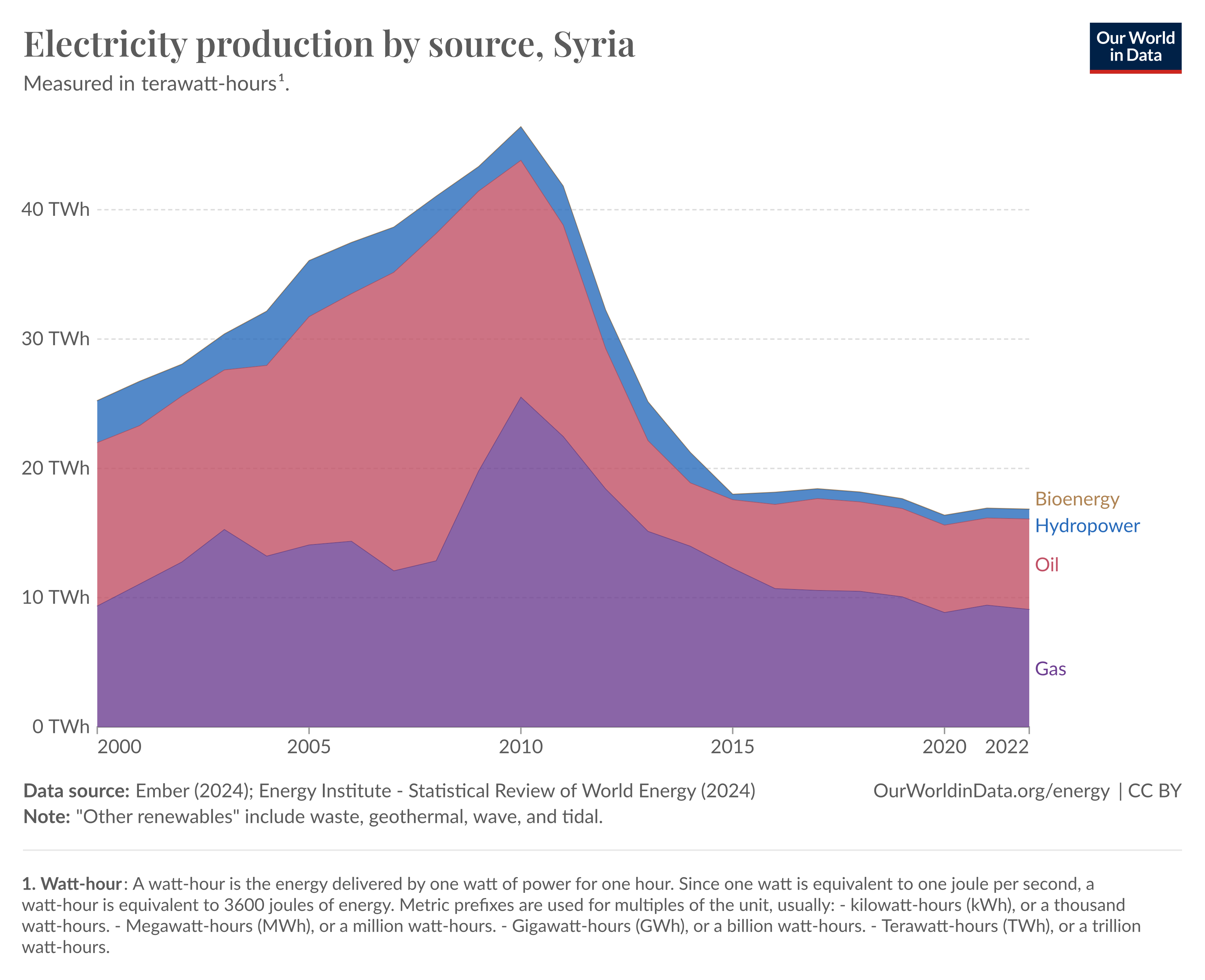
Electricity generation in Syria by source

According to the International Energy Agency in 2022 almost all electricity was generated from oil and fossil gas, like energy in Syria. But according to Anadolu Agency as of 2024 most generation is hydro. In 2024 electricity grids needed war damage to be repaired. As of 2024 generation by power stations in Syria cannot meet demand, resulting in power cuts and air pollution from small diesel generators. The Ministry of Electricity aims to increase generating capacity to 12 GW by 2030. As the country has plenty of sunshine, solar power could be expanded.

== Oil and gas ==
In 2010 oil accounted for about a quarter of Syria's income, estimated as $3.2bn for 2010, and almost all oil exports were to the EU. Production was 400,000 barrels per day (64,000 m^{3}/d) in 2009 and exports about 150,000 barrels per day (24,000 m^{3}/d), mainly Germany, Italy and France. According to BBC oil reserves were 2.5bn barrels in 2010. During the civil war before the fall of Assad the country depended on oil imports from Iran. As of end-2024 some of the country's largest oilfields are in territory controlled by the Syrian Democratic Forces. 2024 oil production is estimated at 30 thousand barrels a day.

Natural gas production is estimated to have fallen from 8.7 billion cubic metres (bcm) in 2011 to 3 bcm in 2023. The Syrian Petroleum Company (SPC) is a state-owned oil company established in 1974.

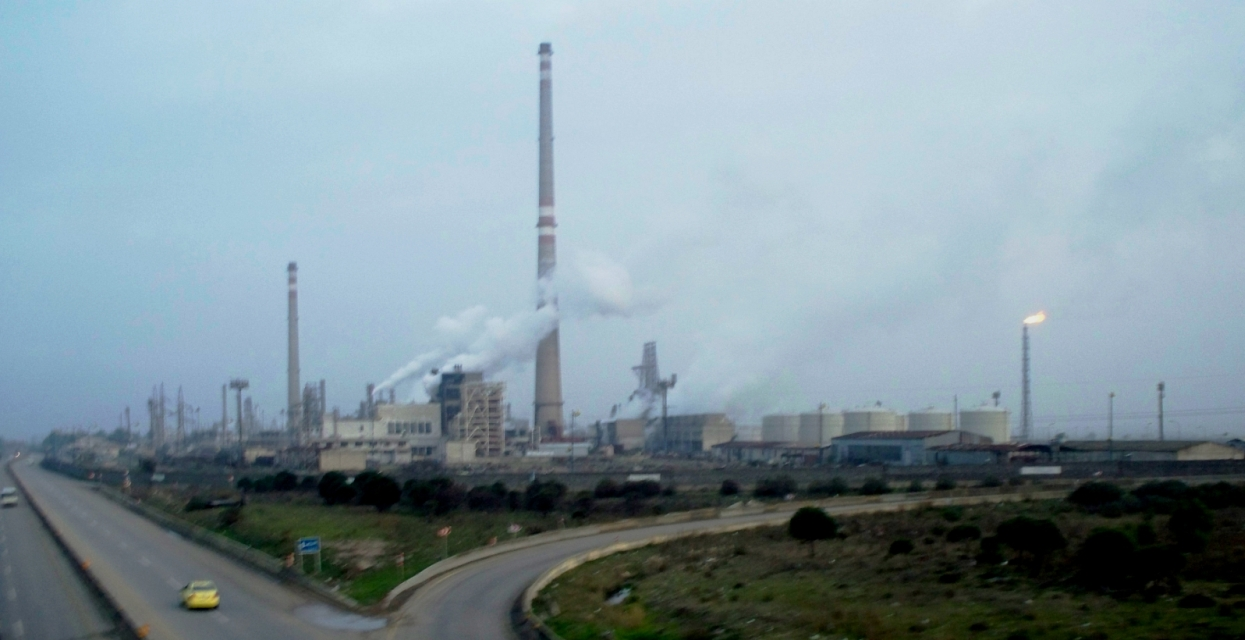
Oil refinery in Homs

Syria's petroleum industry has been subject to a sharp decline. In September 2014, ISIS was producing more oil than the government at 80,000 bbl/d (13,000 m^{3}/d) compared to the government's 17,000 bbl/d (2,700 m^{3}/d) with the Syrian Oil Ministry stating that by the end of 2014, oil production had plunged further to 9,329 bbl/d (1,483.2 m^{3}/d); ISIS has since captured a further oil field, leading to a projected oil production of 6,829 bbl/d (1,085.7 m^{3}/d). In the third year of the Syrian civil war, the deputy economy minister Salman Hayan stated that Syria's two main oil refineries were operating at less than 10% capacity.

Historically, the country produced heavy-grade oil from fields located in the northeast since the late 1960s. In the early 1980s, light-grade, low-sulphur oil was discovered near Deir ez-Zor in eastern Syria. Syria's rate of oil production has decreased dramatically from a peak close to 600,000 barrels per day (95,000 m^{3}/d) (bpd) in 1995 down to less than 182,500 bbl/d (29,020 m^{3}/d) in 2012. Since 2012 the production has decreased even more, reaching 32,000 barrels per day (5,100 m^{3}/d) (bpd) in 2014. Official figures quantity the production in 2015 at 27,000 barrels per day (4,300 m^{3}/d), but those figures have to be taken with precaution because it is difficult to estimate the oil that is currently produced in the rebel held areas.

Prior to the uprising, more than 90% of Syrian oil exports were to EU countries, with the remainder going to Turkey. Oil and gas revenues constituted in 2012 around 20% of total GDP and 25% of total government revenue.
