= Omar Shaqrouq =

Syrian politician

- عمر شقروق

Deputy Minister of Energy for Electricity Affairs
- Incumbent
- Assumed office 1 June 2025
- President: Ahmed al-Sharaa
- Minister: Mohammed al-Bashir

Minister of Electricity
- In office 10 December 2024 – 29 March 2025
- President: Ahmed al-Sharaa (Note: As de facto leader until 29 January 2025.)
- Prime Minister: Mohammed al-Bashir
- Preceded by: Sinjar Taama
- Succeeded by: Mohammed al-Bashir (as Minister of Energy)

Personal details
- Born: Anadan, Aleppo, Syria
- Party: Independent
- Other political affiliations: Hay'at Tahrir al-Sham (until 2025)
- Education: University of Aleppo
- Profession: Politician, Engineer

Omar Mohammed Shaqrouq (Note: Arabic: عمر محمد شقروق) is a Syrian politician and engineer who served as the minister of electricity between December 2024 until March 2025 in the Syrian caretaker government that was formed after the fall of the Assad regime in Syria.

== Early life and education ==
He was born in Anadan, Aleppo. He studied electrical engineering at the University of Aleppo and graduated in 2008. After graduating, he worked at the General Company for Engineering Studies.

== Career ==
Following the start of the Syrian revolution in 2011, he participated in the revolutionary movement in his hometown, joined the Free Engineers Association in Aleppo, and co-founded the "Blessed are the Strangers" Sharia Institute in Aleppo.

In late 2013, Shaqrouq co-founded the Aleppo Electricity and Water Directorate, later renamed to the General Electricity Corporation, which was affiliated with the Al-Nusra Front's General Services Administration and later with the Syrian Salvation Government. He served as assistant director to the General Electricity Corporation and then served as its director in late 2017.

During clashes between the Syrian Liberation Front and Hayat Tahrir al-Sham in early 2018, he was arrested by the Syrian Liberation Front on 27 February 2018 and was released two months later.

By May 2021, he served as general manager of Green Energy, a private company which had signed an agreement with the General Electricity Corporation to supply electricity to Idlib Governorate in mid-2020 and had begun supplying electricity in May 2021.

On 10 December 2024, when the Syrian caretaker government was formed under Prime Minister Mohammed al-Bashir, he was appointed Minister of Electricity.

On 29 March 2025, his ministry, alongside the Ministry of Water Resources and the Ministry of Oil and Mineral Resources, were merged into the newly-formed Ministry of Energy, led by Mohammed al-Bashir.

On 1 June 2025, he was appointed Deputy Minister of Energy for Electricity Affairs via Presidential Decree No. 32 of 2025.

== See also ==
- Cabinet of Syria
- Electricity in Syria
