= Osama Abu Zaid =

Syrian politician

- أسامة أبو زيد

Deputy Minister of Energy for Water Resources Affairs
- Incumbent
- Assumed office 1 June 2025
- President: Ahmed al-Sharaa
- Minister: Mohammed al-Bashir

Minister of Water Resources
- In office December 2024 – 29 March 2025
- President: Ahmed al-Sharaa (Note: As de facto leader until 29 January 2025.)
- Prime Minister: Mohammed al-Bashir
- Preceded by: Moataz Qattan
- Succeeded by: Mohammed al-Bashir (as Minister of Energy)

Director of the Public Agency for Drinking Water under the Syrian Salvation Government
- In office October 2024 – 10 December 2024
- Prime Minister: Mohammed al-Bashir
- Succeeded by: Position abolished
- In office November 2017 – 2020
- Prime Minister: Mohammed al-Sheikh; Fawaz Hilal; Ali Keda
- Preceded by: Position established

Osama Khaled Abu Zaid (Note: Arabic: أسامة خالد أبو زيد) is a Syrian politician who served as the Minister of Water Resources in the Syrian caretaker government that was formed under prime minister Mohammed al-Bashir in the aftermath of the fall of the Assad regime.

== Career ==
Abu Zaid previously worked within the General Administration of Services affiliated with Al-Nusra Front. He was the group's representative in the Water Directorate established by the Army of Conquest in Idlib following its capture in 2015.

In November 2017, he was appointed as the Director of the Public Agency for Drinking Water under the Syrian Salvation Government, a position he held until early 2020. He then became the Executive Director of Green Energy Company for Electricity in Idlib from 2020 to 2024.

Before October 2024, Abu Zaid returned to his role as Director of the Public Agency for Drinking Water in Idlib under the Salvation Government. On 10 December 2024, when the Syrian caretaker government was formed under Prime Minister Mohammed al-Bashir, he was appointed as the Minister of Water Resources.

On 29 March 2025, his ministry, alongside the Ministry of Electricity and the Ministry of Oil and Mineral Resources, were merged into the newly-formed Ministry of Energy, led by Mohammed al-Bashir.

On 1 June 2025, he was appointed Deputy Minister of Energy for Water Resources Affairs via Presidential Decree No. 36 of 2025.
