= Bassam Tohme =

Syrian politician

His Excellency Bassam Tohme
- بسام طعمة

Minister of Oil and Mineral Resources
- In office 30 August 2020 – 29 March 2023
- President: Bashar al-Assad
- Prime Minister: Hussein Arnous
- Preceded by: Ali Suleiman Ghanem
- Succeeded by: Firas Hassan Kaddour

Personal details
- Born: 1969 (age 56–57) Safita, Tartous Governorate, Syria
- Children: 3
- Education: Al-Baath University
- Occupation: Bachelor of Engineering
- Profession: Politician, Oil engineer

Bassam Tohme (Arabic: بسام طعمة; born 1969) is a former Minister of Oil and Mineral Resources of Syria.

== Life and education ==
He was born in Safita in 1969. He has got a degree in petroleum engineering from Al-Baath University in 1993. He got married with three children.

== Career ==
He started work in the Syrian Petroleum Company, Al-Gebsa Fields Directorate in 1993 and he was an engineer in the Central region gas project from 1993 to 1995.

Head of the Gas Collection and Processing Department of the Syrian Gas Company from 2003 to 2005.

He was appointed as Director of Service Contracts of the General Petroleum Corporation from 18 November 2018.

== See also ==
- Petroleum industry in Syria
- Ministry of Oil and Mineral Resources (Syria)
