= Electricity in Syria =

Electricity sector of Syria
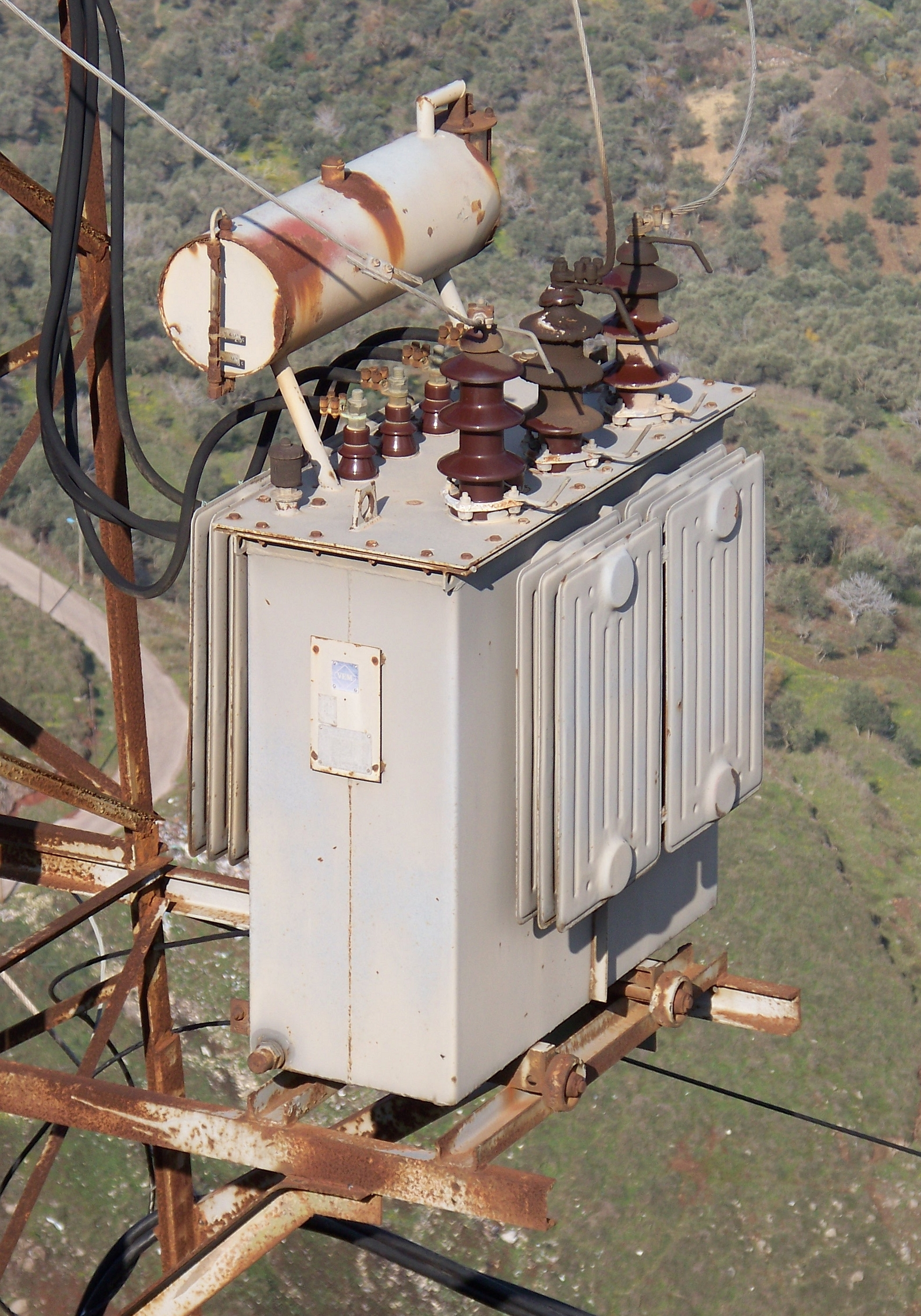
- Pylon transformer

Data
- Installed capacity (2025): 1500 MW

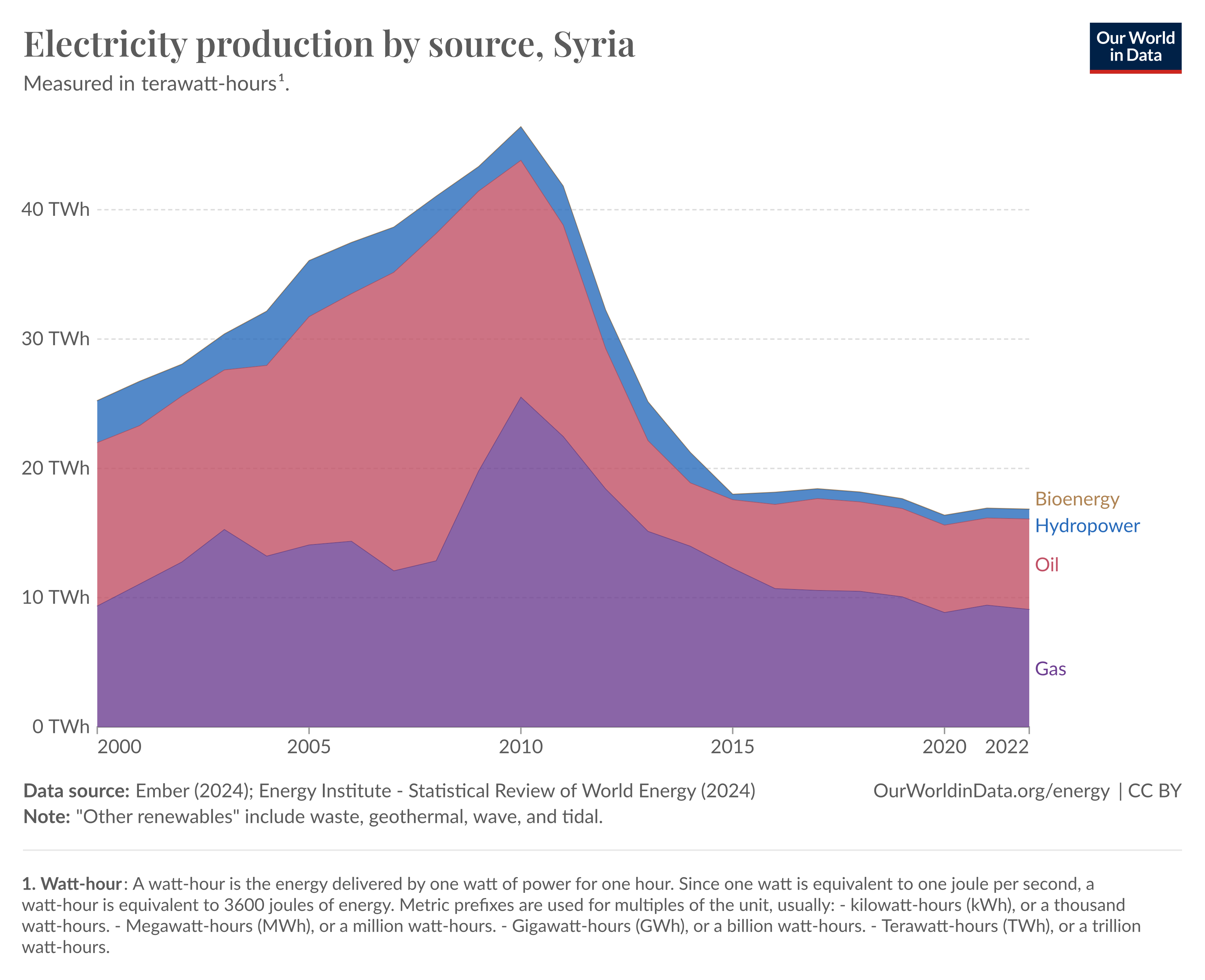
Electricity generation in Syria by source

According to the International Energy Agency in 2022 almost all electricity was generated from oil and fossil gas, like energy in Syria. But according to Anadolu Agency as of 2024 most generation is hydro. In 2024 electricity grids needed war damage to be repaired. As of 2024 generation by power stations in Syria cannot meet demand, resulting in power cuts and air pollution from small diesel generators. The Ministry of Electricity aims to increase generating capacity to 12 GW by 2030. As the country has plenty of sunshine, solar power could be expanded.

== Generation ==
An agreement has been signed for gigawatt scale solar power in Syria.

In 2001 Syria reportedly produced 23.3 billion kilowatt hours (kWh) of electricity and consumed 21.6 billion kWh. As of January 2002, Syria's total installed electric generating capacity was 7.6 gigawatts (GW), with fuel oil and natural gas serving as the primary energy sources and 1.5 GW generated by hydroelectric power. A network totaling 45 GW linking the electric power grids of Syria, Egypt, and Jordan was completed in March 2001. Syria's electric supply capacity is an important national priority, and the government hopes to add 3,000 megawatts of power generating capacity by 2010 at a probable cost of US$2 billion, but progress has been slowed by a lack of investment capital. Power plants in Syria are undergoing intensive maintenance, and four new generating plants have been built. The power distribution network has serious problems, with transmission losses estimated as high as 25 percent of total generated capacity as a result of poor quality wires and transformer stations. A project for the expansion and upgrading of the power transmission network is scheduled for completion in 2005.

As of May 2009 it was reported that the Islamic Development Bank and the Syrian government signed an agreement stating that the bank would provide a €100 million loan for the expansion of Deir Ali power station in Syria.

=== Nuclear ===
Syria abandoned its plans to build a VVER-440 reactor after the Chernobyl accident. The plans for a nuclear program were revived at the beginning of the 2000s when Syria negotiated with Russia to build a nuclear facility that would include a nuclear power plant and a seawater atomic desalination plant.

== Grid ==
As of 2025 the country lacks a stable grid. In August 2025, power rationing had been increased due to increased exports of Azerbijani gas allowing for the reactivation of shut-down and partially operating generation plants, meaning the grid could provide two hours of power for every four hours of outages.

== Interconnectors ==
There is interconnection with electricity in Turkey.

== Government ==
The Ministry of Electricity (Arabic: وزارة الكهرباء) was a department of the Government of Syria. The ministry was responsible for managing the electric energy and renewable energy sector in Syria, and a number of governmental institutions and companies were affiliated to it. On 29 March 2025, as a result of the formation of the Syrian transitional government, the Ministry of Electricity, the Ministry of Water Resources and the Ministry of Oil and Mineral Resources were replaced by and merged into the Ministry of Energy.

In Syria, the production of electricity has been entirely nationalized. By the end of the 1990s, the Ministry of Electricity managed 74,9% of the production of electricity nationwide. The country was planning to become self-sufficient in electricity supply by 1998. For this reason, the Ministry never seriously considered renewable energies because they take a longer time to deploy. By 2010, the government encouraged private investors to develop the electric capacity of the country, but the war broke out.

In November 2021, the Ministry of Electricity annulled dozens of renewable energy licences.

== History ==
=== Pre-2011 ===
In the 2000s, Syria's electric power system struggled to meet the growing demands presented by an increasingly energy-hungry society. Demand grew by roughly 7.5% per year during this decade, fueled by the expansion of Syria's industrial and service sectors, the spread of energy-intensive home appliances, and state policies (i.e. high subsidies and low tariffs) that encouraged wasteful energy practices. Syria's inefficient transmission infrastructure compounded these problems: In 2002, Electricity Minister Munib Saem al-Daher stated that 26% of the country's total electricity production was wasted in transmission, amounting to US$57.7 billion in losses. These factors together resulted in increasingly frequent power cuts, which in turn fueled public frustration.

Throughout this period, the Syrian government sought to close the supply gap by investing in new electricity generation infrastructure. Investments moved away from oil-powered infrastructure and toward gas-fueled power plants, reflecting Syria's declining domestic oil production, improved access to natural gas, and the superior efficiency of gas-fed combined cycle power plants. New investments relied significantly on international technical expertise to execute projects, notably by the German firm Siemens, but also by firms hailing from Iran, India, and elsewhere. They also relied on international financing, including from the European Investment Bank and the Arab Fund for Economic and Social Development.

=== Wartime disruption ===
The Syrian civil war wrought havoc on the country's electricity system, leading to increasingly frequent blackouts across the country, disruptions to all forms of economic activity, and reports that electrical fires increased due to problems with the electrical grid.

==== Infrastructural damage ====
Swathes of Syria's generation and transmission infrastructure were damaged or destroyed, due to a combination of bombardment by Syrian government forces, aerial attacks by the US-led international military intervention against the Islamic State, attacks by insurgent groups, and looting by armed factions. Between 2015 and 2017, violence and looting destroyed three major power plants, namely the Aleppo Thermal Station, Zayzoon in Idlib, and al-Taim in Deir Ezzor. Pre-war, these three plants had accounted for almost one-fifth of Syria's total generation capacity. In 2021, Syria's Ministry of Electricity estimated total losses to the electricity sector at US$2.4 billion.

==== Resource scarcity ====
In addition to infrastructural damage, war also left Syria with acute shortages of the fuel and water needed to power Syria's thermal and hydroelectric infrastructure. On one side, the Syrian government's loss of major oil and gas fields first to the Islamic State and then to the Autonomous Administration of North and East Syria contributed to extreme fuel scarcity and thus a reliance on imports, notably from Iran. On the other, rising temperatures, diminished rainfall, and Turkish restrictions on the flow of the Euphrates River brought the latter's water levels to a crisis point, thus threatening the capacity of the three dams located along the Euphrates in Syria: namely the Euphrates Dam, Mansoura Dam, and Tishrin Dam.

==== Expertise scarcity ====
Pre-2011, Syria relied heavily on foreign expertise to spearhead the most complex forms of investment in Syria's electrical sector, including repairing and installing generation infrastructure. After a decade of war, the combination of international sanctions and foreign exchange shortages had created major obstacles to bringing in foreign expertise. To make matters worse, Syria's own pool of homegrown technical competence was reduced by a relentless brain drain and devastating setbacks to the country's education sector.

==== Sanctions ====
International sanctions against Syria further undermined Syria's electricity sector, including by barring foreign (i.e. European and Arab) entities from extending loans or implementing infrastructure projects and by straining Syria's ability to import fuel and spare parts.

==== 2021 ====
A 2021 report by the European University Institute said:

"Before the 2011 conflict, Syria's electricity infrastructure was barely functional. There were high production and transmission losses with frequent load shedding, especially in the summer. Syria had poor structural and performance indicators: power losses stood at nearly 26% and there were 43 days of power outage per year. Tariffs were low due to heavy government subsidies.

However, ten years of war has worsened matters considerably. Per capita consumption of state electricity is 15% of what it was in 2010. For instance, in the first half of 2021, Aleppo had ten-hours of rationing for every hour or half an hour of power; Damascus had, instead, five “dead” hours for one hour of electricity. The damage to the grid and substations can be fixed at reasonable rates with local expertise. This is not the case, though, with power generation plants. The conflict saw four of the 14 plants suffer serious damage, representing nearly 18% of the pre-war installed capacity nationwide. Two other plants near Hama and Damascus have also been damaged but have since been partially repaired.

In 2021, the Ministry of Electricity estimated the sector’s production and transmission reconstruction cost at USD 2.4 billion. Though difficult to quantify, indirect losses in lost output in other sectors due to electricity cuts are likely to be orders of magnitude higher. Firms in regime-held areas identify the interruption to essential services as their main obstacle to doing business.

Renewable energy use was falling even before the conflict, from 20% in the early 1990s to 5% as the conflict began. With the continued slowdown in water flow from Turkey and the failure to fix hydroelectric turbines, hydro sources contributed only 2% of public supply in 2020. While the government has made it easier for private investors to participate in the green electricity sector, especially wind and solar energy, their contribution remains negligible.

Despite much talk and numerous memoranda of understanding, very little of the production capacity has been repaired. The country’s two principal backers, Russia and Iran, have shown little appetite for following through on agreements due to the government’s inability to secure funding. The country’s most pressing need is not restoring its production capacity, but, rather, sourcing enough fuels to reach its existing potential and fixing the damaged grid. These electric-related problems are complex and regional politics, sanctions, and technical issues all play their part. But Syria’s current electricity crisis is, at base, financial."

== See also ==
- List of power stations in Syria
