= Mohammad al-Atrash =

Syrian politician (born 1934)

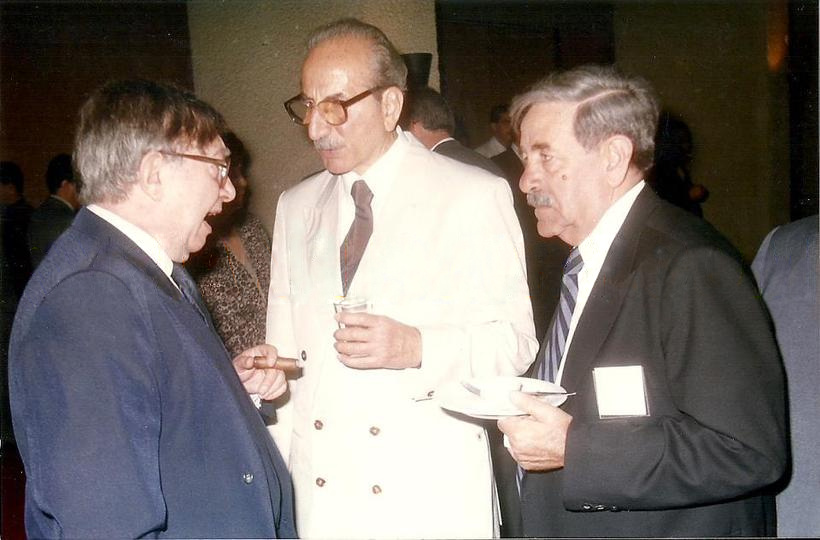
- Mohammad al-Atrash on left

Minister of Finance
- In office 13 December 2001 – 10 September 2003
- President: Bashar al-Assad
- Prime Minister: Muhammad Mustafa Mero
- Preceded by: Khalid Al Mahayni
- Succeeded by: Mohammad Al Hussein

Personal details
- Born: 1934 (age 91–92) Tartus
- Party: Independent
- Education: London School of Economics; University of London

Mohammad al-Atrash (Arabic: محمد الأطرش) (born 1934) is a Syrian economist and independent politician who served as a cabinet minister in different periods.

== Early life and education ==
Al-Atrash was born in Tartus in 1934. He received a bachelor's degree from London School of Economics. He also holds a PhD in economics, which he received from the University of London.

== Career ==
Al-Atrash worked as an advisor to the World Bank. He was the director of Syria at the Bank. After public offices, al-Atrash began to take part in cabinet positions as an independent politician. From 1980 to 1984, he served as economy minister. He resigned from office due to disagreements with then-prime minister Rauf Kasim. He was again named as minister of finance to the cabinet headed by Muhammad Mustafa Mero on 13 December 2001. Al-Atrash's appointment occurred as part of the cabinet reshuffle, and he replaced Khalid Al Mahaini. Al-Atrash's term lasted until 10 September 2003 when he was replaced by Mohammad Al Hussein as finance minister.

=== Views ===
Al-Atrash is a moderate socialist and social democrat, believing in controlling the need for change.
