= Second Mustafa Mero government =

2001–2003 Syrian government

- 87th government of the Syrian Arab Republic
- Date formed: 13 December 2001
- Date dissolved: 10 September 2003

People and organisations
- President: Bashar al-Assad
- Prime Minister: Mustafa Mero
- Prime Minister's history: Mero I
- Deputy Prime Ministers: Mustafa Tlass; Farouk al-Sharaa; Muhammad Naji al-Otari; Mohammad al-Hussein
- Total no. of members: 33
- Member parties: ▌Ba'ath Party
- Status in legislature: Majority coalition government

History
- Election: 2003
- Legislature terms: 7th and 8th People's Assemblies
- Predecessor: Mero I
- Successor: al-Otari

The Second Mustafa Mero government was the first Syrian government during the presidency of Bashar al-Assad. It was established on 13 December 2001 and lasted until 10 September 2003 when the President designated Muhammad Naji al-Otari to form a new government.

== Composition ==
The new government was headed by Mustafa Mero, who repeated term, and formed by 33 ministers. There were 15 ministers retaining their office and 18 new ministers. There were two women: Najwa Qassab Hassan as Minister of Culture and Ghada al Jabi as Minister of Social Affairs and Labor. Five members were part of the Baathist leadership: Mero and his four deputy ministers.

Portfolio	Minister	Took office	Left office	Party
Prime Minister	Mustafa Mero	13 March 2000	18 September 2003	Ba'ath Party
Deputy Prime Minister	Mustafa Tlass	11 March 1984	18 September 2003	Ba'ath Party
Deputy Prime Minister	Farouk al-Sharaa	13 December 2001	18 September 2003	Ba'ath Party
Deputy Prime Minister for Services Affairs	Muhammad Naji al-Otari	13 March 2000	18 September 2003	Ba'ath Party
Deputy Prime Minister for Economical Affairs	Mohammad al-Hussein	13 December 2001	18 September 2003	Ba'ath Party
Minister of Foreign Affairs	Farouk al-Sharaa	11 March 1984	18 September 2003	Ba'ath Party
Minister of Finance	Mohammad al-Atrash	13 December 2001	18 September 2003	Independent
Minister of Defense	Mustafa Tlass	22 March 1972	18 September 2003	Ba'ath Party
Minister of Higher Education	Hassan Risheh	13 March 2000	18 September 2003	Ba'ath Party
Minister of Local Administration	Hilal al-Atrash	13 December 2001	18 September 2003	Ba'ath Party
Minister of Tourism	Saadallah Agha al-Qalaa	13 December 2001	18 September 2003	Independent
Minister of Agriculture and Agrarian Reform	Nureddine Muna	13 December 2001	18 September 2003	
Minister of Education	Mahmoud al-Sayyed	13 March 2000	18 September 2003	
Minister of Supply and Internal Trade	Bassam Muhammad Rustom	13 December 2001	18 September 2003	
Minister of Economy and Foreign Trade	Ghassan al-Rifai	13 December 2001	18 September 2003	Independent
Minister of Health	Muhammad Iyad al-Shatti	1 November 1987	18 September 2003	
Minister of Justice	Muhammad Nabil al-Khatib	13 March 2000	18 September 2003	Ba'ath Party
Minister of Endowments	Muhammad Ziyada	13 March 2000	18 September 2003	
Minister of Irrigation	Muhammad Radwan Martini	13 December 2001	18 September 2003	
Minister of Social Affairs and Labor	Ghada al-Jabi	13 December 2001	18 September 2003	
Minister of Oil and Mineral Resources	Ibrahim Haddad	13 December 2001	18 September 2003	Independent
Minister of Interior	Ali Hammoud	13 December 2001	18 September 2003	Ba'ath Party
Minister of Information	Adnan Omran	13 December 2001	18 September 2003	Ba'ath Party
Minister of Culture	Najwa Qassab Hassan	13 December 2001	18 September 2003	
Minister of Electricity	Munib Saem al-Dahr	13 March 2000	18 September 2003	
Minister of Construction and Reconstruction	Hussam Asswad	13 December 2001	18 September 2003	
Minister of Housing and Utilities	Ayman Waili	13 December 2001	18 September 2003	
Minister of Transportation	Makram Obeid	13 December 2001	18 September 2003	Independent
Minister of Industry	Issam al-Zaim	13 December 2001	18 September 2003	Ba'ath Party
Minister of Communication and Technology	Muhammad Bashir Monjed	13 December 2001	18 September 2003	
Minister of Presidential Affairs	Haitham Duweihi	13 March 2000	18 September 2003	
Minister of State for Expatriates Affairs	Nasser Qaddour	13 December 2001	18 September 2003	
Minister of State for Environmental Affairs	Adnan Khuzam	13 December 2001	18 September 2003	
Minister of State	Faissal Jawish	13 December 2001	18 September 2003	
Minister of State	Abdelkarim Sayyed Youssef	13 December 2001	18 September 2003	
Minister of State	Abdelnasser Abdelmuti Dawoud	13 December 2001	18 September 2003	

== See also ==
- Council of Ministers (Syria)
- List of Syrian governments
- Government ministries of Syria
- List of prime ministers of Syria
