= Suleiman Al Abbas =

Syrian engineer and politician

- سليمان العباس

Minister of Petroleum and Mineral Resources
- In office 9 February 2013 – 2016
- Prime Minister: Wael Nader al-Halqi
- Preceded by: Saeed Hunedi
- Succeeded by: Ali Suleiman Ghanem

Personal details
- Party: Syrian Regional Branch of the Arab Socialist Ba'ath Party
- Education: University of Ploieşti

Suleiman Al Abbas (Arabic: سليمان العباس) is a Syrian engineer and politician who served as Minister of Petroleum and Mineral Resources from 2013 to 2016.

== Education ==
Abbas earned a bachelor's degree in petroleum engineering in 1982 at the University of Ploieşti in Romania. He also obtained certificates in oil well control and contract arbitration from the Arab Engineers Federation.

== Career ==
Abbas served as director of Al Jibseh oil fields in 1997. In 2005, he was appointed director of the Planning Department at the Syrian Petroleum Company. He became a board member of Al Furat Oil Company in 2008. He also served as deputy oil minister. On 9 February 2013, he was appointed Minister of Petroleum and Mineral Resources to the cabinet headed by Prime Minister Wael Nader al-Halqi in a minor cabinet reshuffle. Abbas replaced Saeed Hunedi as oil minister. His term ended in 2016.

=== Sanctions ===
Abbas has been in the list of financial sanctions imposed by the United Kingdom against Syria since 2014 due to his alleged role in the repression of the Syrians during the civil war.
