= Petroleum industry in Syria =

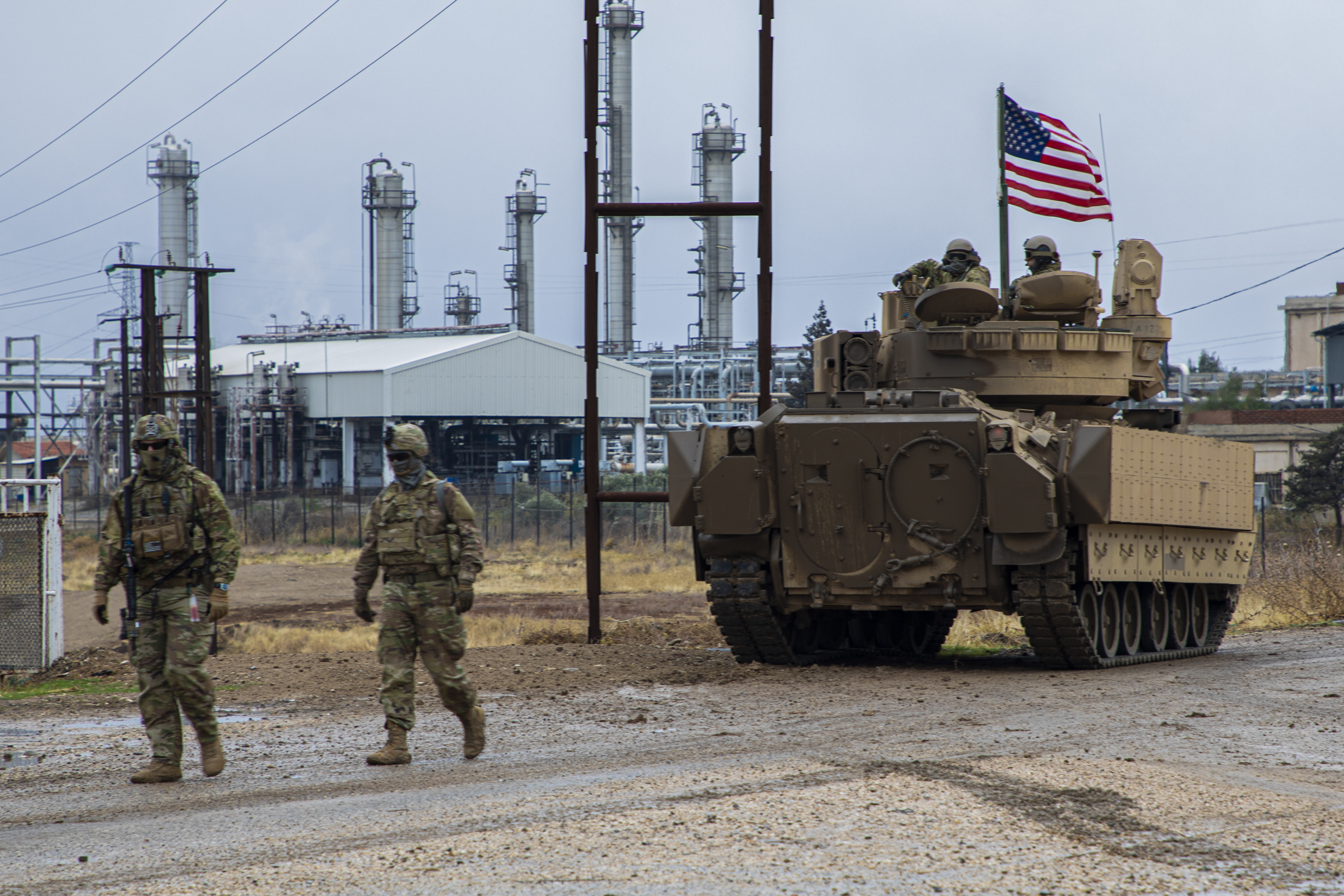
U.S soldier behind an oil refinery in Northeastern Syria

The petroleum industry in Syria forms a major part of the economy of Syria. According to the International Monetary Fund, before the Syrian civil war, oil sales for 2010 were projected to generate $3.2 billion for the Syrian government and accounted for 25.1% of the state's revenue.

Syria is a relatively small oil producer, only accounting for 0.5% of the global production in 2010; by 2016, it had dropped to less than 0.05%. Although Syria is not a major oil exporter by Middle Eastern standards, oil is a large industry forming a major component of the Syrian economy, because of Syria's extremely low GDP per capita. Syria's oil sector has been hit by the Civil War and international sanctions imposed on Syria.

Syria's two biggest oil companies are the Syrian Petroleum Company (SPC), which is owned by the Ministry of Energy, and Al-Furat Petroleum Company which is 50% owned by General Petroleum Corporation and the other 50% are foreign owned. The joint venture of AFPC currently includes General Petroleum Corporation with 50%, Syria Shell Petroleum Development with 32%, and the remainder held by Deminex, which is owned by Himalaya Energy Syria, a consortium of China National Petroleum Company and India's Oil and Natural Gas Corporation.

As of December 2011 Shell has suspended operations in Syria due to EU sanctions. Another important consortium is Deir Ez Zor Petroleum Company, owned by SPC and France's Total. Total suspended operations in the country from December 2011. A more recent entrant is the United Kingdom's Gulfsands Petroleum. As of February 2012, Gulfsands has suspended its Syrian operations due to EU sanctions.

== Geography ==
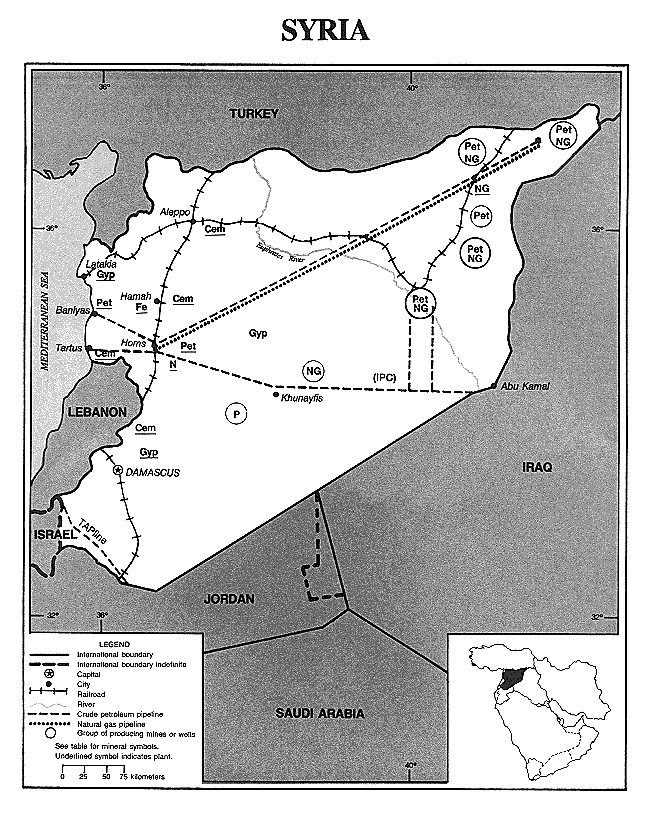
Syrian oil fields and pipelines

Syria is the only significant crude oil producing country in the Eastern Mediterranean region, which includes Jordan, Lebanon, Israel and the Palestinian territories. According to the Oil and Gas Journal, Syria had 2,500,000,000 barrels (400,000,000 m^{3}) of petroleum reserves as of 1 January 2010. Syria's known oil reserves are mainly in the eastern part of the country in the Deir ez-Zor Governorate near its border with Iraq and along the Euphrates River, and a number of smaller fields are located in the center of the country. In 2010, Syria produced around 385,000 barrels (61,200 m^{3}) per day of crude oil. Oil production has stabilized after falling for a number of years, and is poised to turn around as new fields come online. In 2008, Syria produced 5.3 billion cubic metres (1.9×10^{11} cu ft) of natural gas, and two years later in 2010, it increased production to 7.8×10^{9} m^{3} (2.8×10^{11} cu ft). While much of its oil is exported to Europe, Syria's natural gas is used in reinjection for enhanced oil recovery and for domestic electricity generation.

Although Syria produces relatively modest quantities of oil and gas, its location is strategic in terms of regional security and prospective energy transit routes. The first section of the Arab Gas Pipeline to enter Syria, totalling 600 kilometres (370 mi) through Syria, starts at the Jordan–Syria border in the south, connecting to Tishreen and Deir Ali power stations. This was subsequently extended to connect to Deir Ammar power station in Lebanon and Baniyas in Syria. A further section was planned to continue up to the Turkish border, but the ongoing civil war is expected to further delay this connection.

== History ==
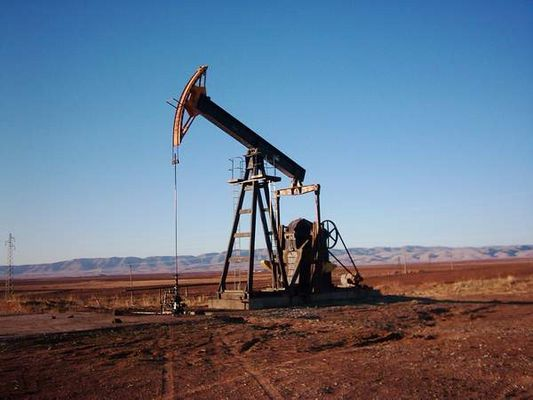
A pumpjack in Syria's Rmelan oil fields

Syrian oil exploration first began in 1933 during the French Mandate by the Iraq Petroleum Company (a consortium made up of Shell, BP, Exxon-Mobil, Total, and Gulbekian), which after unsuccessfully drilling eleven wells, gave up hope of finding any oil in Syria. In 1949, James W. Menhall (1881–1974), an independent oil producer from Illinois, United States, was approached by Syrian President Shukri al-Quwatli to come to Syria to prospect for oil. His James W. Menhall Drilling Company was awarded a concession on 17 May 1955 by unanimous vote of the Syrian parliament and started drilling in April 1956. In September 1956, Menhall discovered the Karatchok oil field with over 1 billion barrels of reserves. Six consecutive wells were drilled, each producing in excess of 4,000 barrels (640 m^{3}). Menhall was just commencing preparations to drill the adjoining Rumeilan oil field (with over 500 million barrels of reserves) when, on 5 October 1958, President Gamal Abdel Nasser of Egypt, as President of the United Arab Republic, expropriated Menhall's concession and confiscated his equipment and three drilling rigs without compensation. The Syrian government, under the Ba'ath Party leadership, has since refused to consider any compensation. The Syrian oil industry took off in 1968, when the Karatchok oil field began production after a pipeline connecting it to the Homs refinery was completed, although Syria did not begin exporting oil until the mid-1980s.

In 2009, Syria's net petroleum exports were estimated to be 148,000 bbl/d (23,500 m^{3}/d). All oil exports are marketed by Sytrol, Syria's state oil marketing firm, which sells most of its volume under 12-month contracts. Before the imposition of EU sanctions, Syrian crude oil exports went mostly to the European Union, in particular Germany, Italy, and France, totaling an estimated 137,400 bbl/d (21,840 m^{3}/d) in 2009, according to Eurostat. In 2010, the European Union as a whole spent $4.1 billion on Syrian oil imports.

=== Oil production during the Syrian Civil War ===
The Syrian Civil War broke out in 2011 and is ongoing. In the same year, Syria's major trading partners imposed international sanctions on Syrian oil and financial system, devastating the Syrian oil industry, adding to the devastation of the civil war. Local exporters of oil in Syria include the Altoun Group in Maaraba, Rif Dimashq, Syria, formed in 1968, which it is owned by Salim Altoun, has been on an EU sanctions list since May 2012.

During the civil war, the self-declared state of Islamic State of Iraq and the Levant (ISIL/ISIS) controlled most oil fields in eastern Syria starting from 2013, in which they smuggled the oil located in Deir ez-Zor province outside Syria by producing 34,000–40,000 barrels per day (bpd). Quality of Petroleum determined price of each barrel sold at the wellhead 25 to 45 dollars.

Production by oil field (2016 data)
| Oil field | Est. production (bpd) | Price ($/barrel) |
|---|---|---|
| al-Tanak | 11,000-12,000 | $40 |
| al-Omar | 6,000-9,000 | $45 |
| al-Tabqa | 1,500-1,800 | $20 |
| al-Kharata | 1,000 | $30 |
| al-Shoula | 650-800 | $30 |
| Deiro | 600-1,000 | $30 |
| al-Taim | 400-600 | $40 |
| al-Rashid | 200-300 | $25 |

Following the American control of eastern Syria, American President Donald Trump claimed on 28 October 2019 that $45 million a month could be earned from the Syrian oil. In November 2019 Trump said to the press that “We’re keeping the oil, we have the oil, the oil is secure, we left troops behind only for the oil.” In November 2019, Syrian President Bashar al-Assad stated that ISIS terrorists have two partners in stealing the Syrian oil since 2014, Recep Tayyip Erdoğan and the Americans. A CNN News report has showed that a company known as Delta Crescent Energy Company, which was formed by James Cain, a former US ambassador to Denmark, James Reese, a retired Delta Force Army officer, and John Dorrier, a veteran oil executive, was formed for the purpose of securing an oil contract in Syria and had worked with the U.S. State Department. In April 2020, the company received a license from the Treasury Department exempting it from the sanctions the US has placed on Syria in order to isolate the Syrian government. On 28 May 2021, the Biden administration decided not to renew Delta Crescent's license, and gave them 30 days to cease operations in Syria; the company no longer operates there. China has alleged the U.S. steals Syrian oil at the UN.

However, Syria produced 406,000 barrels per day (bpd) in 2008, but the oil production dropped to 353,000 bpd in 2011 and had plunged to just 24,000 bpd by 2018, a reduction of more than 90%, according to the BP Statistical Review of World Energy.

In January 2020, militants sent divers to plant explosives on the underwater pipelines at an oil facility of Syria. On January 27, the bombs exploded off the Mediterranean coast, leaving the Baniyas oil refinery damaged. The facility at the time was recorded to have capacity to process over 13,000 barrels of crude oil per day.

== Challenges ==
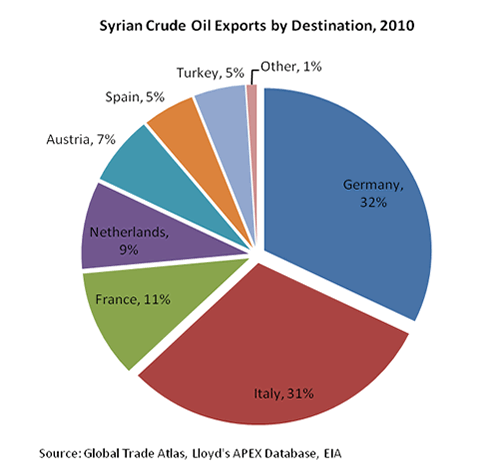
Syria oil exports by destination country in 2010 (note that as of 2012, all countries on this chart no longer trade oil with Syria due to sanctions against the country)

Besides the Civil War and the imposition of international sanctions, Syria's oil sector faces a number of challenges, including a decline in output and production resulting from technological problems and a depletion of oil reserves. Syria's rate of oil production has decreased steadily from a peak of close to 610,000 bbl/d (97,000 m^{3}/d) in 1995 down to approximately 385,000 bbl/d (61,200 m^{3}/d) in 2010. Meanwhile, consumption is rising, which means that Syria could become a net oil importer within a decade. To counteract this problem, Syria intensified oil exploration efforts.

Syria's upstream oil production and development has traditionally been the mandate of the Syrian Petroleum Company (SPC), owned by the Syrian Ministry of Petroleum and Mineral Resources. SPC has undertaken efforts to reverse the trend toward declining oil production and exports by increasing oil exploration and production in partnership with foreign oil companies. The SPC directly controls about half of the country's oil production and takes a 50% stake in development work with foreign partners.

Foreign investment is vital for improving production levels; however, following the outbreak of the Syrian Civil War, many countries important to Syria's oil exports have imposed sanctions, which legally prevents Western companies from working in the country.

Al-Furat Petroleum Company is a joint venture established in 1985. It is currently 50% owned by SPC and the other 50% is foreign owned: Anglo-Dutch Shell with 32%, and the remainder held by Himalaya Energy Syria, a consortium of China National Petroleum Company and India's Oil and Natural Gas Corporation. The company produced an average 100,000 bbl/d (16,000 m^{3}/d). As of December 2011 Shell has suspended operations in Syria due to EU sanctions.

Deir Ez Zor Petroleum Company is a consortium owned by SPC and France's Total. Total formed its Syrian operation in 1988 and in 2008 renewed its partnership sharing agreement with Syria. Prior to the Syrian Civil War, the company produced an average 27,000 bbl/d (4,300 m^{3}/d) from its fields around Deir ez-Zour.

A more recent entrant is the United Kingdom's Gulfsands Petroleum. At the beginning of 2011, its oil fields produced 20,700 bbl/d (3,290 m^{3}/d). As of February 2012, Gulfsands has suspended its Syrian operations due to EU sanctions. Gulfsands dealings in Syria were also hit by EU sanctions due to Syrian tycoon Rami Makhlouf, a cousin of the Syrian president, holding 5.7% of the company, with this stake being suspended in August 2011 due to specific sanctions relating to Makhlouf. Other international players include or included: Canada's Suncor, Poland's Kulczyk, US-Egyptian firm IPR, Croatia's INA, Russia's Stroytransgas and Soyuzneftegaz, and Triton Singapore.

Another option to handle the increase in domestic oil consumption besides increasing oil production is to switch power stations from oil-fired to natural gas-fired. Proven natural gas reserves, approximately three-quarters of which are owned by the Syrian Petroleum Company, were estimated at 2.6 trillion cubic meters (9.1 trillion cubic feet) in 2010. A major challenge for the natural gas industry is logistics: reserves are located mainly in northeastern Syria, whereas the population is concentrated in the west and south.

== Exploration prospects ==
In 2005, Norwegian Wavefield Inseis conducted seismic surveys off Syria's Eastern Mediterranean coast, the subsequent report which was published in 2011 by French company CGGVeritas, showed "encouraging results" of oil and gas reserves in the Syrian territorial waters.

In May 2007, Syria's Ministry of Oil and Mineral Reserves introduced four offshore sectors for exploration, yet the British company Dove Energy Limited application was declined, as it was without competition.

In 2010, a US Geological Survey had already estimated 1.7 billion barrels of recoverable oil and 122 trillion cubic feet of natural gas in the whole Levantine Basin.

In March 2011, Ministry of Oil and Mineral Reserves presented another four offshore blocks with an area of 7,750 square kilometres (2,990 sq mi) for exploration, however, the political situation deterred companies from utilizing the opportunity.

In December 2013, Soyuzneftegaz signed a deal with the Syrian government to explore, drill, develop and produce oil and gas in Block 2 with an area of 2,977 square kilometres (1,149 sq mi) off Syria's coast. In July 2014, the deal was ratified with the Panama-registered Soyuzneftegaz East Med. In August 2017, an amendment to the contract was approved, to include Russian company East Med Amrit S.A., a sub-company of Soyuzneftegaz. Those changes in names and origins were to avoid International sanctions on dealing with the Syrian government. However, Soyuzneftegaz could not meet its contractual agreement in Syria. The company stopped its operations in Syria in 2015 because of the Syrian conflict.

In 2019, two Russian companies, Mercury LLC and Velada LLC, signed deals with the Syrian government to explore and develop gas and oil fields in Block 7 with an area of 9,531 square kilometres (3,680 sq mi), Block 19 in the northeastern region, and in Block 23 with an area of 2,159 square kilometres (834 sq mi) in the region to the north of Damascus respectively. Moreover, companies such as JSC Zarubezhneft, JSC Zarubezhgeologia, STG Engineering and Technopromexport started their survey to explore land and sea energy resources in Syria, with the prospect of gas exploration in the regions of Qara and al-Bureij.

In March 2021, Russian company, Capital Limited, and the Syrian Ba'athist government represented by the Ministry of Oil and Mineral Resources, signed a contract to grant the Russian company the exclusive rights to explore natural oil and gas in Block 1 in the eastern Mediterranean with an area of 2,250 square kilometres (870 sq mi) off the coast of Tartus to the southern Syrian-Lebanese maritime borders.
