= Ibrahim Haddad =

Syrian politician (born 1938)

- ابراهيم حداد

Minister of Oil and Mineral Reserves
- In office 13 December 2001 – 14 February 2006
- President: Bashar al-Assad
- Prime Minister: Mohammad Mustafa Mero; Muhammad Naji al-Otari
- Preceded by: Maher Jamal
- Succeeded by: Sufian Allaw

Personal details
- Born: 1938 (age 87–88) Ain Ghara Tal Kalakh, Syria
- Party: Independent
- Education: University of Reading

Ibrahim Haddad (Arabic: ابراهيم حداد) (born 1938) is a Syrian politician who served as minister of oil and mineral reserves from December 2001 to February 2006.

== Early life and education ==
Haddad was born into a Christian family in Ain Ghara Tal Kalakh, Homs Governorate, in 1938. He holds a PhD in radiation physics, which he received from the University of Reading in 1966.

== Career ==
Haddad served as the director general of Syria's Atomic Energy Commission until 2001. He was also Syria's delegate to the International Atomic Energy Agency.

He was appointed oil minister on 13 December 2001, replacing Maher Jamal in the post. He was an independent member of the cabinet headed by Prime Minister Mohammad Mustafa Mero. Haddad continued to serve in the same post in the cabinet led by Prime Minister Mohammad Naji Al Otari, which was formed in 2003. Haddad's term lasted until 11 February 2006, and was replaced by Sufian Allaw as oil minister.

After leaving office Haddad was appointed energy advisor to Otari in March 2006.

=== Activities ===
When Haddad was oil minister, Syria's oil production significantly declined to below 400,000 barrels/day (b/d) from a peak of 600,000 b/d in the mid-1990s. In addition, the Russian oil company, Tatneft, developed a contract with Syria to extract oil in the country during his term in March 2005. It was the first oil contract between Syria and Russia.
