= Mohammad al-Hussein =

Syrian politician

Mohammad al-Hussein محمد الحسين

Minister of Finance
- In office 18 September 2003 – 14 April 2011
- President: Bashar al-Assad
- Prime Minister: Muhammad Naji al-Otari
- Preceded by: Mohammad al-Atrash
- Succeeded by: Mohammad al Jililati

Deputy Prime Minister for Economic Affairs
- In office 13 December 2001 – 10 September 2003
- President: Bashar al-Assad
- Prime Minister: Muhammad Mustafa Mero
- Preceded by: Khalid Raad

Member of the Regional Command of the Syrian Regional Branch
- In office 21 June 2000 – 8 July 2013

Personal details
- Party: Syrian Regional Branch of the Arab Socialist Ba'ath Party

Mohammad al-Hussein (Arabic: محمد الحسين) is a Syrian economist and politician who is a member of the Ba'ath Party. He served in different cabinet positions.

== Education ==
Hussein holds a PhD in economy, which he received from a university in Romania.

== Career ==
Hussein started his career in the public sector and worked for a long time there. He also served as an economy professor at Aleppo University. Then he became a member of the Baath Party's ruling regional command. In addition, he served as the head of the party's committee of economic affairs. In 2000, he became a member of the party's central committee.

On 13 December 2001, Hussein was appointed deputy prime minister for economic affairs in the cabinet headed by then prime minister Mohammad Mustafa Mero. Hussein replaced Khalid Raad as deputy prime minister. Hussein's term lasted until 2003. In September 2003, he was appointed finance minister, replacing Mohammad al-Atrash. The cabinet, formed on 18 September 2003, was headed by then prime minister Mohammad Naji Al Otari. Hussein retained his post in the cabinet reshuffles of 2006 and 2009. However, his tenure ended in 2011.
