= Maher Jamal =

Syrian politician

Minister of Oil and Mineral Reserves
- In office 3 July 1996 – 13 December 2001
- President: Hafez al-Assad; Bashar al-Assad
- Prime Minister: Mahmoud Zuabi; Mohammad Mustafa Mero
- Preceded by: Nader Nabulsi
- Succeeded by: Ibrahim Haddad

Personal details
- Born: Mohammad Maher bin Husni Jamal
- Party: Independent

Maher Jamal is a Syrian engineer and politician who served as oil minister of Syria between 1996 and 2001.

== Career ==
Jamal is an oil engineer by profession. He served as chairman of al Furat Petroleum Cooperation from January to July 1996. He was appointed minister of petroleum and mineral resources in a cabinet reshuffle on 3 July 1996. Jamal replaced Nader Nabulsi as oil minister in the cabinet led by Mahmoud Zuabi. Jamal continued to serve as oil minister in the next cabinet headed by Prime Minister Mohammad Mustafa Mero, which was formed on 13 March 2000. Jamal's tenure lasted until December 2001 when he was replaced by Ibrahim Haddad.
