= Baniyas Refinery =

Oil refinery in Baniyas, Syria

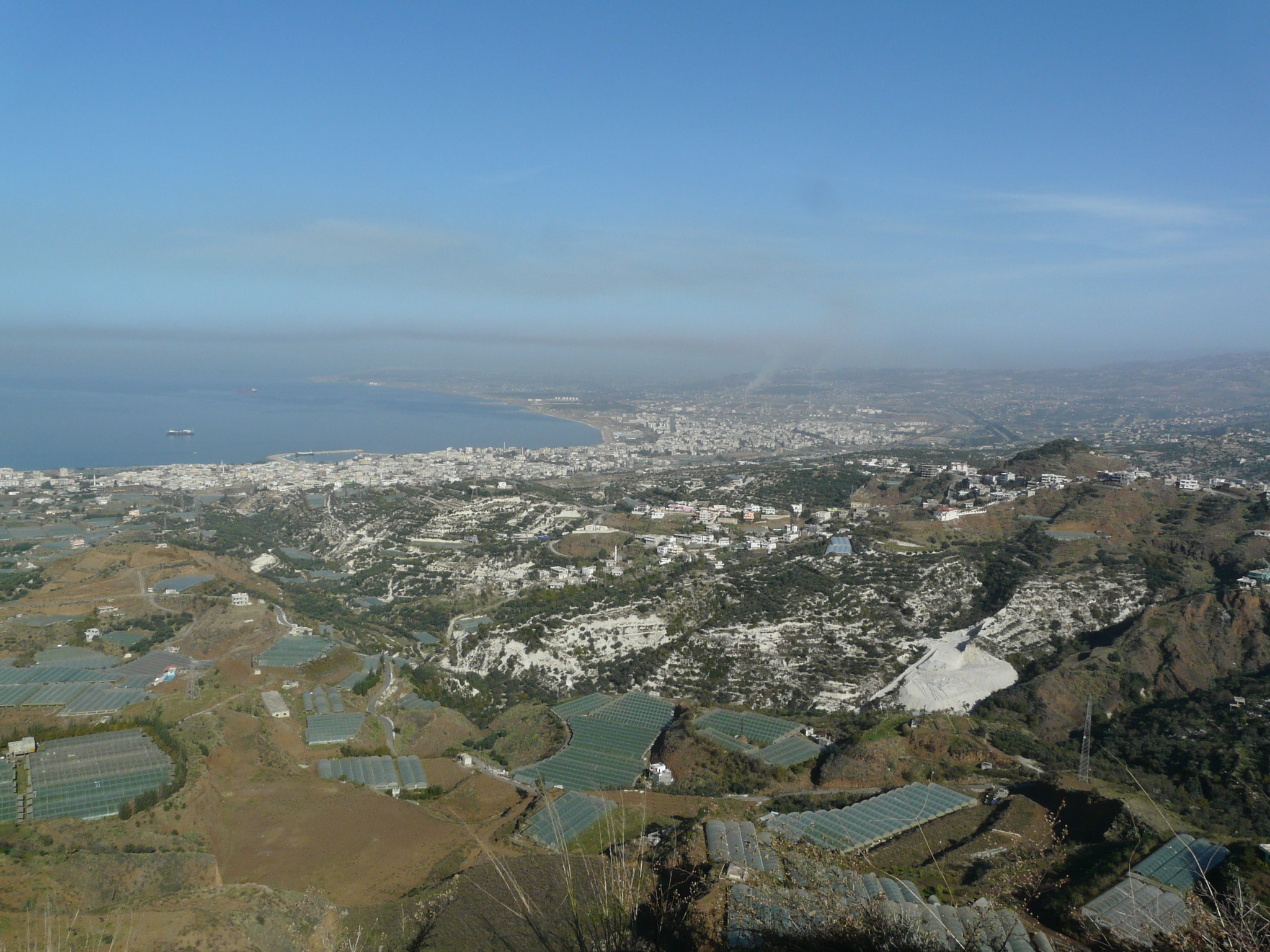
- Aerial view of Baniyas

- Location of Baniyas Refinery within Syria
- Location: Baniyas, Tartus, Syria; 35°13′1″N 35°57′34″E

Refinery details
- Owner: Baniyas Oil Company
- Capacity: 125,000 barrels per day (19,900 m^{3}/d)
- Refining units: 4
- Website: brc.sy

The Baniyas Refinery (Arabic: مصفاة بانياس, romanized: Miṣfāh Bāniyās) is an oil refinery located north of Baniyas, Syria. It is the largest oil refinery in Syria. It is owned by the Baniyas Oil Company, which is managed by the Ministry of Oil and Mineral Resources. Of its four refining units, two process light crude, originally configured for Euphrates Valley crude, and two process heavy crude, originally configured for Suwayda crude. Pipelines connect the refinery to oil fields in Deir ez-Zor and Al-Hasakah. The refinery houses a thermal power station that runs on fuel oil and has an installed capacity of 30 MW.

During the Syrian civil war, the refinery processed up to 125,000 barrels per day imported from Iran by oil tankers, which docked at Baniyas oil terminal. Following the fall of the Assad regime in December 2024, it was forced to temporarily halt operations due to the cessation of Iranian imports. In September 2025, the refinery received deliveries of imported equipment as part of a modernisation project.

Several incidents have occurred at the facility. In 2019, an explosion during site maintenance killed a worker. In August 2021, a fuel leak from the refinery power plant caused an oil spill along the Syrian coast.

== See also ==
- Petroleum industry in Syria
- Baniyas Refinery SC
