= Sophie Zurquiyah =

Sophie Zurquiyah (born November 24, 1966) is a French-American engineer and business executive. She currently serves as the Chair and Chief Executive Officer of Viridien (formerly CGG), a global technology and services company specializing in geosciences and infrastructure monitoring.

== Early life and education ==
Zurquiyah holds an engineering degree from École Centrale Paris (1989) and later earned a Master's in aerospace engineering from the University of Colorado. Her academic training provided a foundation in advanced technical disciplines before moving into industry leadership.

== Career ==
Her professional journey began in 1991 with Schlumberger, where she held several senior roles including Chief Information Officer and President of Data & Consulting Services from 2009 to 2012. Following that, she served as Vice-President responsible for engineering and technical support.

In February 2013, she joined CGG and eventually assumed leadership of the company on April 30, 2025. Under her guidance, the company rebranded to Viridien and pivoted its offering towards low-carbon markets, digital geosciences and infrastructure monitoring.

== Board memberships and other roles ==
Beyond her executive duties, Zurquiyah joined the board of TechnipFMC in April 2021 as a member of its audit committee. She also served on the board of Safran from April 2017 until February 2023.
