= Khalid Raad =

Syrian academic

Deputy Prime Minister
- In office 14 March 2000 – 13 December 2001
- President: Hafez al-Assad; Bashar al-Assad
- Prime Minister: Mohammad Mustafa Mero
- Preceded by: Salim Said Yasin
- Succeeded by: Mohammad Al Hussein

Khalid Raad (Arabic: خالد رعد) is a Syrian liberal economist, technocrat and former deputy prime minister, who was in charge of economic affairs.

== Career ==
Raad taught courses at Damascus University. He also headed Syria's Free Zones Authority. He was appointed as deputy prime minister in charge of economic affairs to the cabinet led by Prime Minister Muhammad Mustafa Mero on 13 March 2000, replacing Salim Said Yasin, who had been in office since 1985. Raad's tenure ended on 13 December 2001 and he was replaced by Mohammad Al Hussein as deputy premier.
