= Muhammad Nabil Al Khatib =

Syrian politician

- محمد نبيل الخطيب

Minister of Justice
- In office 13 March 2000 – 18 September 2003
- President: Hafez al-Assad; Bashar al-Assad
- Prime Minister: Muhammad Mustafa Mero
- Preceded by: Abdullah Tolba
- Succeeded by: Nizar Al Assi

Personal details
- Party: Ba'ath Party

Muhammad Nabil Al Khatib (Arabic: محمد نبيل الخطيب) is a Syrian politician and member of the Ba'ath Party. He served as justice minister from 2000 to 2003.

== Career ==
Khatib became a member of the central committee of the Baath Party in 2000. He was first appointed justice minister by President Hafez al-Assad to the cabinet headed by Muhammad Mustafa Mero in March 2000. He continued to serve as justice minister after the first cabinet reshuffle by Bashar al-Assad when he became the president of Syria. In a 2001 reshuffle, he retained his post. His term lasted until 2003. Then Khatib was appointed head of the Syrian Commission in 2006, which was in charge of investigating the assassination of Lebanese prime minister Rafiq Hariri. In April 2009, President Bashar Assad named Khatib as chairman of the central commission of inspection.
