= Sufian Allaw =

Syrian politician

Sufian Alalao
- سفيان العلاو
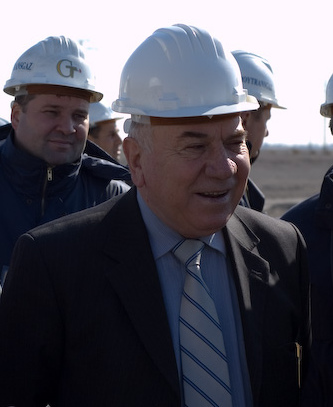
- Sufian Allaw in January 2007

Minister of Petroleum and Mineral Resources
- In office 21 February 2012 – 9 February 2018
- President: Bashar al-Assad
- Prime Minister: Mohammad Naji Al Otari; Adel Safar
- Preceded by: Ibrahim Haddad
- Succeeded by: Suleiman Al Abbas

Personal details
- Born: 1944 (age 81–82) Damascus, Syria
- Died: 04/20/2026 Damascus Syria
- Party: Ba'ath Party
- Children: Five
- Education: University of Aleppo

Sufian Allaw (Arabic: سفيان العلاو; born 1944) is a Syrian former politician who served as the oil minister of Syria from 2012 to 2018.

== Early life and education ==
Allaw was born in Abu Kamal in Deir ez-Zor Governorate in 1944. He earned a degree in electrical and mechanical engineering from University of Aleppo in 1966.

== Career ==
Allaw worked as an engineer at the Syrian telecommunications establishment from 1966 to 1967. Then he was named as the investment director of the facility at the general establishment of the Euphrates dam from 1967 to 1980. He served as an engineer at the ministry of irrigation from 1980 to 1983 and at the prime ministry for energy affairs from 1983 to 1984. He became deputy electricity minister in 1984 and was in office until 2004. He served as an expert at the state planning commission from 2004 to 2005 and at the energy department at the United Nations' economic and social commission for Western Asia in 2004.

He later was appointed oil minister to the cabinet headed by Mohammad Naji Otari on 11 February 2006. In the April 2011 after the cabinet was reshuffled he retained his post and also served in the cabinet of Adel Safar. His term as oil minister ended on 9 February 2013, being replaced by Suleiman Al Abbas.

== Personal life ==
Allaw is married to Basmaa Allaw with five children.
