= List of power stations in Syria =

This article lists all power stations in Syria.

== Renewable ==
=== Hydroelectric ===
| Station | Community | Coordinates | Capacity (MW) |
|---|---|---|---|
| Mansoura Dam | Raqqa | 35°53′07″N 38°44′50″E | 81 |
| Euphrates Dam | Tabqa | 35°52′20″N 38°34′00″E | 800 |
| Tishrin Dam | Abu Qalqal | 36°22′53″N 38°11′00″E | 630 |

== Non-renewable ==
=== Thermal ===
| Station | Community | Coordinates | Capacity (MW) | Year built | Fuel | Ref |
|---|---|---|---|---|---|---|
| Aleppo Thermal Power Plant | Aleppo | 36°10′30″N 37°26′22″E | 1065 (426 in 2023) | 1997 | Fuel oil | |
| Al Nasryeh (Nasserieh) OCGT Power Plant | Al-Naseriyah | 33°48′4.32″N 36°40′58.08″E | 384 | 1995 | Natural gas | |
| Al-Zara Thermal Power Plant | Al-Zara | 34°57′30″N 36°39′44″E | 660 | 2001 | Fuel oil | |
| Latakia (Ar Rastin) Power Plant | Latakia | 35°31′N 35°47′E | 526 | 2023 (planned) | CHP | |
| Banias Thermal Power Plant | Baniyas | 35°10′17.4″N 35°55′37.2″E | 680 | 1981 | Fuel oil | |
| Dier Ali CCGT Power Plant | Deir Ali | 33°16′11.28″N 36°19′40.08″E | 750 | 2010 | CCGT | |
| Homs Refinery Cogen Power Plant | Homs | 34°43′6.24″N 36°37′57.22″E | 64 | 1984 | Fuel oil | |
| Jandar CCGT Power Plant | Jandar | 34°27′58.32″N 36°47′0.24″E | 700 | 1997 | CCGT | |
| Mehardeh Thermal Power Plant | Mahardah | 35°15′46.8″N 36°35′6″E | 630 | 1979 | Fuel oil | |
| Swedieh (Suwayda) OCGT Power Plant | Al-Suwayda | 37°0′9″N 42°4′11.28″E | 150 | 1981 | Natural gas | |
| Teshreen (Tishrin) Power Project (Thermal+OCGT) | Rif Dimashq | 33°25′6.96″N 36°41′9.96″E | 656 (400+256) | 1993/1995 | Natural gas+fuel oil | |
| Thayyem Power Plant | Deir ez-Zor | 35°12′8″N 40°5′4″E | 96 | 1991 | Natural gas+fuel oil | |
| Zayzoun (Zayzun) CCGT Power Plant | Zayzun | 35°44′13.2″N 36°21′43.2″E | 544 | 1997 | CCGT | |

== See also ==
- List of largest power stations in the world
- List of power stations in Asia
- Electricity in Syria
