= Viridien =

French company

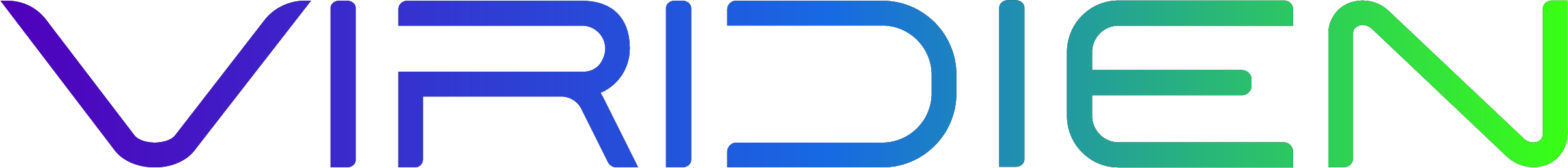
- Type: Société Anonyme
- Traded as: Euronext Paris: VIRI; CAC Mid 60
- ISIN: FR001400PVN6
- Industry: Geoscience
- Founded: 1931
- Headquarters: Massy, France
- Area served: Global
- Key people: Henning Berg (CEO)
- Services: Geoscience
- Number of employees: 3,500 FY2024
- Website: www.viridiengroup.com

Viridien (VIRI), formerly CGG, is a multinational technology, digital and Earth data company, specializing in solving complex natural resource, energy transition and infrastructure challenges.

== History ==
In 1926, Conrad Schlumberger, and his brother Marcel Schlumberger, formed Société de Prospection Electrique (SPE) which specialized in oil and coal exploration as well as civil engineering.

In March 1931, SPE and Société Géophysique de Recherches Minières (SGRM), both specialists in seismology and magnetometry, merged into La Compagnie Générale de Géophysique (CGG). SGRM provided 5,000,000 francs of capital and CGG provided 120,000 francs of capital. In his premises at 30 rue Fabert, in Paris, Conrad Schlumberger decided to transfer the subsurface business to CGG while SPE retained the logging. Marcel Champin was Chairman and Conrad Schlumberger was Vice-Chairman. At the same time, Raymond Maillet from SGRM was appointed President of CGG.

In 1954, CGG acquired its first IBM 604 computer and an MT4 analog computing center for processing field data.

In 1958, CGG completed its first dual-vessel marine survey with one source vessel.

In 1966, CGG opened its first seismic data processing center in Massy, France.

In 1971, CGG started 3D marine seismic exploration with wide-line profiling .

1974-1990, Journey into the Earth, Part 4: The third dimension

=== Veritas DGC ===
Veritas Energy Services, a geophysical services company, was established in 1974 in Calgary, Alberta, Canada with the purchase of a Rafael Cruz owned firm Rafael B. Cruz and Associates Ltd. by David B. Robson.

Meanwhile, Digital Consultants Inc. had been established in Houston, Texas in 1965. In 1969, Digital Consultants reincorporated as Digicon Inc. (DGC), becoming a public company on the American Stock Exchange.

In 1977, the a single-channel cable telemetry system used for extreme conditions, SN348, was introduced.

In 1979, commercial depth migration was offered.

In 1994, 4D seismic surveys were carried out.

In 1996, Veritas DGC was formed from the merger of Veritas and Digicon.

Then in 2000, the company began imaging 4D time-lapse seismic data for carbon storage injection and monitoring.

=== CGGVeritas ===
The company became CGGVeritas through its merger with the North American company Veritas in 2007.

CGGVeritas acquired Norwegian company Wavefield Inseis in December 2008.

=== CGG ===
In September 2012, CGGVeritas acquired Fugro's Geoscience Division for €1.2 billion, and changed back its name to CGG.

In 2015, CGG applied new full-waveform inversion and reverse-time migration imaging technologies on massive regional-scale, multi-client datasets in Norway, Gabon and the Gulf of Mexico.

In 2019, CGG introduced time-lag full-waveform inversion.

In 2020, CGG exited seismic acquisition services.

=== Viridien ===
In May 2024, CGG officially rebranded to Viridien.

In April 2025, Sophie Zurquiyah was appointed Chair of the Board, succeeding Philippe Salle in the role.

== Operations ==
=== Natural Resources ===
Viridien develops geoscience technology to find natural resources and manage those resources sustainably. The organization focuses on oil and gas exploration, development and production; mineral exploration and mine development; and geothermal monitoring.

Minerals and mining: Viridien supports mineral exploration through global geological predictions and plate kinematic studies, satellite-derived surface material alteration targeting, provision of geophysical equipment, and the development and provision of modeling software, as well as monitoring services for mining operations and mine tailing storage facilities.

Geothermal: Viridien provides global screening datasets, as well as evaluating and monitoring geothermal developments to gain insight across asset life cycle by utilizing: data and analytics, resource assessments, reservoir characterization, and production and monitoring.

=== Environmental ===
Viridien utilizes analytics and Earth monitoring to understand and provide insights about human impact on the environment. Viridien focuses on environmental insight (on land, ocean, or atmosphere) through remote sensing, machine learning analytics, data analysis and interpretation, and high performance computing (HPC).

Some of the environmental projects in which Viridien has worked on include conducting microplastics pollution surveys as part of a study for an effort to create a Plastic Free zone at Yr Wydffa (Snowdon).

=== Infrastructure ===
Viridien utilizes monitoring technology and digital twin models to understand an infrastructure’s life span, condition and maintenance needs. Viridien Sercel Structural Monitoring solutions detect potential issues early on to provide structure integrity and public safety.

One of the known applications of Viridien infrastructure monitoring technology is in its work on the "Connected Bridges" project for a French public body. Viridien contributed to the implementation of autonomous sensors and cloud-based signal processing.

=== Energy Transition ===
Viridien is focused on monitoring geothermal developments, carbon capture utilization and storage, and management of minerals.

Viridien provides datasets to help identify and screen suitable sites for geological carbon storage.

Viridien has screening, evaluating and monitoring capabilities for subsurface risks, helping to speed-up development and minimize risk. Additionally, Viridien works on responsible management of minerals for energy transition.

=== Digital ===
Viridien has digital capabilities in data management, data transformation, machine learning and cloud services. In 2023, the Viridien HPC hub in the UK helped increase its global total HPC capacity to 500 petaflops, and the HPC business has expanded its commercial offering with AI cloud services.

== Organization ==
Viridien is divided into two segments:
• Data, digital and energy transition
• Sensing and monitoring

=== Data, Digital and Energy Transition ===
This includes geoscience (subsurface imaging, geology, reservoir, technology function) and Earth data.

Earth data includes the vast Viridien library of Earth data and digital ecosystems for data that assists in natural resource development and energy transition applications.

=== Sensing and Monitoring ===
Sercel designs and manufactures solutions for subsurface exploration, structural monitoring, defense and underwater acoustics.

== Seismic Survey Controversies ==
In December 2023, it was announced by environmental group Seaspiracy that CGG had been granted authorization by the South African government to conduct seismic blasting between Plettenberg Bay and Gqeberha.

The announcement stirred backlash from environmental groups and South African civil society. This backlash mirrored a similar response to attempts by Shell PLC and Shearwater Geo to conduct seismic blasting off the Wild Coast in December 2021.
