= Issam Al Zaim =

Issam Al Zaim عصام الزعيم

Minister of Industry
- In office 13 December 2001 – 10 September 2003
- Prime Minister: Mohammad Mustafa Mero

Personal details
- Born: 1940
- Died: 14 December 2007 (aged 67)
- Party: Syrian Regional Branch of the Arab Socialist Ba'ath Party

Issam Al Zaim (Arabic: عصام الزعيم) (4 August 1940 – 14 December 2007) was a Syrian economist and former minister of industry. He also served as minister of state planning.

== Career ==
Zaim was a researcher at the French National Centre for Scientific Research. Then Zaim held the post of minister of state for planning. He was appointed as minister of industry to the cabinet led by then prime minister Mohammad Mustafa Mero on 13 December 2001. His tenure ended in 2003 when the government resigned.

=== Controversy ===
Zaim and his wife's assets were seized by Syrian authorities in 2003 as part of a probe into the alleged misuse of public funds by the couple. He and his wife were acquitted of all charges a few months later.

== Death ==
Zaim died of a heart attack at the age of 67 and was buried in Aleppo. He was survived by his wife and son.
