= Wavefield Inseis =

Wavefield Inseis ASA
- Company type: Public
- Industry: Geophysics
- Founded: 2001
- Defunct: December 12, 2008
- Headquarters: Oslo, Norway
- Area served: Global
- Key people: Atle Jacobsen (CEO); Anders Farestveit (Chairman)
- Parent: CGGVeritas

Wavefield Inseis was a Norwegian company trading between 2001 and 2009 that offered global marine geophysical services. By 2008 the company operated a total of six geophysical survey vessels, and could supply services in 2D, 3D, 4D, multi-azimuth, and wide-azimuth, with both exclusive and multi-client services.

The company had its main offices in Oslo and Bergen, in addition to offices in Perth, London, and Houston. It was listed on the Oslo Stock Exchange.

== History ==
The firm was formed from the merger of two companies, Wavefield Geophysical, and InSeis.

In December 2006, the company acquired 30% of Optoplan, an optical sensor provider. In October 2008, the company acquired the remaining shares.

Wavefield was acquired by French seismic company CGGVeritas in December 2008 and is now fully owned by them. The Wavefield name has ceased to exist except in holding companies / legal entity status.
