= Ministry of Oil and Mineral Resources (Syria) =

Government ministry of Syria

- وزارة النفط والثروة المعدنية

Agency overview
- Formed: 1966
- Dissolved: 2025
- Superseding agency: Ministry of Energy
- Jurisdiction: Government of Syria
- Headquarters: Damascus
- Website: mompr.gov.sy

The Ministry of Oil and Mineral Resources (Arabic: وزارة النفط والثروة المعدنية, romanized: Wizārat al-Nafṭ wa-al-Tharwah al-Maʻdinīyah) was a department of the Cabinet of Syria of the Syria. It was led by the Minister of Oil. On 29 March 2025, it, alongside the Ministry of Electricity and the Ministry of Water Resources, was replaced by the Ministry of Energy.

== History ==
Former logo of this ministry until 2024.

It was established as "Ministry of Petroleum and Mineral Resources" which created under Legislative Decree No. 139 on 26 October 1966. On behalf of the "Ministry of Oil and Electricity" and in implementation of industrial projects, it was amended by Legislative Decree No. 121 on 19 May 1970 as "Ministry of Oil and Electricity and Mineral Resources" and then changed its name to "Ministry of Petroleum and Mineral Resources" under Legislative Decree No. 94 on 23 September 1974.

In 2020, United States sanctions were placed on the ministry.

== Responsibilities ==
Identified the functions and competencies of the Ministry of Petroleum and Mineral recourses under Legislative Decree No. 121 of 1970 and Act No. 45 6/30/2001 so as to become its terms of reference are the following:

1. Supervision of the institutions and enterprises of the ministry.
2. The supervision of the Prospecting production and investment efficiently managed if productivity was oil and mineral resources.
3. The policy of all aspects of the activity on the oil, gas and mineral resources.
4. Supervision of the implementation of development projects and the activity related with both oil and mineral resources.
5. Adoption of the development plans of institutions and companies of the ministry, that continued their implementation.
6. Prepare studies and plans which the process of development required and modernization of the ministry and with a view to keeping pace with The developments oil industry and mineral resources in the world.
7. Coordination among the institutions, and enterprises of the ministry, and work to resolve all differences.
8. Working to secure funding for its projects productivity and investment cooperation with the concerned authorities.

== Institutions and companies affiliated with the Ministry ==
- General Oil Corporation
- Syrian Petroleum Company
- Syrian Gas Company
- Syrian Company for Oil Transport
- Al Furat Oil Company
- Deir Ezzor Oil Company
- Kawkab Oil Company
- Hayyan Oil Company
- Ebla Oil Company
- Degla Oil Company
- Al-Rasheed Oil Company
- General Corporation for Oil Refining and Distribution of Petroleum Derivatives
- State Company for Homs Refinery
- State Company for Baniyas Refinery
- General Corporation of Geology and Mineral Resources
- The General Company for Phosphates and Mines
- National Seismic Center
- Institute of Petroleum and Mineral Professions

== Ministers for Oil and Mineral Resources ==
Minister	Government	Term
Minister of Oil and Mineral Resources
Mustafa Haddad (first)	Hafez al-Assad Government; First Abdul Rahman Khleifawi Government	1970 to 1972
Fayez Al-Nasser	Mahmoud al-Ayyubi Government	1972 to 1973
Al-Kafri's reparation	Mahmoud al-Ayyubi Government	1973 to 1974
Adnan Mustafa	Mahmoud al-Ayyubi Government; Second Abdul Rahman Khleifawi Government	1974 to 1976
Issa Darwish	Second Abdul Rahman Khleifawi Government; Muhammad Ali al-Halabi Government	1976 to 1980
Abdul-Jabbar Al-Dahhak	Abdul Rauf al-Kasm Government	1980 to 1984
Ghazi Al-Droubi	Abdul Rauf al-Kasm Government	1984 to 1987
Matanios Habib	Mahmoud Zuabi Government	1987 to 1992
Nader Nabulsi	Mahmoud Zuabi Government	1992 to 1996
Maher Jamal	Mahmoud Zouabi Government; First Mustafa Mero Government	1996 to 2001
Ibrahim Haddad	Second Mustafa Mero government Muhammad Naji al-Otari government	2001 to 2006
Sufian Allaw	Muhammad Naji al-Otari government Adel Safar government	2006 to 2012
Said Heneidy	Riyad Hijab government First Wael al-Halqi government	2012 to 2013
Suleiman al-Abbas	First Wael al-Halqi government Second Wael al-Halqi government	2013 to 2016
Ali Suleiman Ghanem	Imad Khamis government	2016 to 2020
Bassam Tohme	First Hussein Arnous government Second Hussein Arnous government	2020 to 2023
Firas Hassan Kaddour	Second Hussein Arnous government	2023 to 2024
Ghiath Diab (last)	Syrian caretaker government	2024 to 2025

== See also ==
- Petroleum industry in Syria
- Ministry of Petroleum
