= Syrian Petroleum Company =

Syrian state-owned oil company

- Type: State owned
- Industry: Oil and gas
- Founded: 1974
- Headquarters: Damascus, Syria
- Key people: Nabih Khristin, Director-General
- Products: Petroleum
- Parent: Syrian Ministry of Oil and Mineral Resources (1974–2025); Syrian Ministry of Energy (2025–present) (Note: On 29 March 2025, the Ministry of Electricity, the Ministry of Oil and Mineral Resources and the Ministry of Water Resources were merged to become the Ministry of Energy.)
- Website: spc.sy

The Syrian Petroleum Company (SPC, Arabic: الشركة السورية للنفط, or Syria Petroleum) is a state-owned oil exploration and production company. The company was established in 1974 and re-established in 2025 by Decree No. 189.

SPC operated fields around Al-Sweidiyeh in the Al-Hasakah Governorate, including Al-Houla, Shadada, Jbeissa, Sweida and Rmelan. In March 2011, SPC produced about 55% of total oil produced in Syria. On 18 August 2011, SPC was put into the United States sanctions list due to the Syrian civil war.

China’s state-owned China National Petroleum Corporation (CNPC) has large stakes in one of Syria's biggest oil companies the Al-Furat Petroleum Company, as well as in a number of Syrian oil fields. India has made two significant investments in Syria in the oil sector in the pre-conflict days. First, an agreement was signed in January 2004 between Oil and Natural Gas Corporation (ONGC) and IPR International for exploration of oil and natural gas in Block 24 near Deir ez-Zor in northern Syria. Second, investments by India's ONGC and China's CNPC to jointly acquire the 37% stake of PetroCanada in the Syrian Al Furat Petroleum Company. The conflict and subsequent sanctions have slowed ONGC's operations in Syria.

== Subsidiaries ==
The Syrian Petroleum Company owns a 50% stake in Syria's main oil producer, Al-Furat Petroleum Company. Other shareholders of the Al-Furat Petroleum Company are Royal Dutch Shell, India's Oil and Natural Gas Corporation, and the China National Petroleum Corporation.

Other subsidiaries are:

- Amrit Petroleum Company (50%)
- Awda Petroleum Company (50%)
- Dujla Petroleum Company (50%)
- Hayyan (50%)
- Kawkab Oil Company [KOC] (50%)
- Deir Ezzor Petroleum Company (50%)
