= Ministry of Energy (Syria) =

Government ministry of Syria

- وزارة الطاقة

Agency overview
- Formed: 29 March 2025; 17 months ago
- Preceding agency: Ministry of Oil and Mineral Resources Ministry of Electricity Ministry of Water Resources
- Jurisdiction: Government of Syria
- Headquarters: Damascus
- Minister responsible: Mohammed al-Bashir
- Website: moenergy.gov.sy

The Ministry of Energy (Arabic: وزارة الطاقة, romanized: Wizārat al-Ṭāqah) is a government ministry in Syria and part of the cabinet. It is responsible for developing and implementing policies concerning petroleum and related products. It was established on 29 March 2025 as the result of a merger between the Ministry of Electricity, the Ministry of Oil and Mineral Resources and the Ministry of Water Resources.

== Ministers of Energy ==
No.	Name	Term of office		Ref.
No.	Name	Took office	Left office	Ref.
1	Mohammed al-Bashir	29 March 2025	Incumbent	

== Directorates and bodies ==
- Directorate of Systems and Technology
- Directorate of Human Resources
- Directorate of Irrigation and Drainage
- Directorate of Planning and International Cooperation
- Directorate of Legal Affairs
- Drinking Water Directorate
- Administrative Development Directorate
- Directorate of Equipment and Energy Rationalization
- Sanitation Directorate
- Directorate of International Waters and Dams

== Institutions and companies affiliated with the Ministry ==
- General Oil Corporation
- Syrian Petroleum Company
- General Authority for Water Resources
- Syrian Gas Company
- Syrian Company for Oil Transport
- Al Furat Oil Company
- Deir Ezzor Oil Company
- Kawkab Oil Company
- Hayyan Oil Company
- Ebla Oil Company
- Degla Oil Company
- Al-Rasheed Oil Company
- General Corporation for Oil Refining and Distribution of Petroleum Derivatives
- State Company for Homs Refinery
- State Company for Baniyas Refinery
- General Corporation of Geology and Mineral Resources
- The General Company for Phosphates and Mines
- National Seismic Center
- Institute of Petroleum and Mineral Professions

== See also ==
- Council of Ministers (Syria)
