= Muhammad Mustafa Mero =

Prime minister of Syria (2000–2003)

- محمد مصطفى ميرو

Prime Minister of Syria
- In office 7 March 2000 – 10 September 2003
- President: Hafez al-Assad; Abdul Halim Khaddam (interim); Bashar al-Assad
- Deputy: Mohammad Al Hussein; Muhammad Naji al-Otari; Mustafa Tlass; Farouk al-Sharaa
- Preceded by: Mahmoud Zuabi
- Succeeded by: Muhammad Naji al-Otari

Governor of Aleppo Governorate
- In office 26 December 1993 – 12 March 2000
- President: Hafez al-Assad
- Preceded by: Mohamed Mawaldi
- Succeeded by: Salah Kanaj

Member of the Regional Command of the Syrian Regional Branch
- In office 21 June 2000 – 9 June 2005

Personal details
- Born: 1941 Al-Tall, First Syrian Republic
- Died: 22 December 2020 (aged 78–79) Al Tall, Syrian Arab Republic
- Party: Ba'ath Party
- Other political affiliations: National Progressive Front
- Education: Damascus University; Moscow State University
- Cabinet: Mero I Mero II

Muhammad Mustafa Mero (Arabic: محمد مصطفى ميرو, romanized: Muḥammad Muṣṭafā Mīrū; 1941 – 22 December 2020) was a Syrian politician who served as Prime Minister of Syria from 7 March 2000 to 10 September 2003.

== Early life and education ==
Mero was born into a Sunni rural family in al-Tall in the outskirts of Damascus in 1941. He attended Damascus University. Later he acquired a PhD in Arabic language and literature from the University of Moscow. (Note: Some sources report that he gained his PhD from the Yerevan State University.)

== Career ==
Mero became a member of the Ba'ath Party in 1966. He joined the Arab Teachers' Union, becoming its secretary general for cultural affairs and publications. He served as governor of the Daraa province from 1980 to 1986. He was appointed governor of the Al Hasakah province in 1986 and served in the post until 1993. In 1993, he became governor of the Aleppo province and was in office until 2000. Despite regional tensions between Syria and Turkey at the time, he was said to have enjoyed good relations with the Turkish government and was integral in dealings between the two governments. In June 2000, he became a leading figure in the Ba'ath party.

On 7 March 2000, shortly before the death of President Hafez al-Assad, Mero was appointed as prime minister, replacing Mahmoud Zuabi, who had been in office since 1987. Mero's cabinet was announced on 13 March 2000, and was tasked with tackling economic reforms and combatting corruption. After the death of Assad in 2000, he was one of a nine-member committee that oversaw the transition period.

He was retained by the new president, Bashar al-Assad, and was promoted within the ranks of the ruling Ba'ath Party. Mero headed a ministerial and commercial delegation to neighboring Iraq in August 2001, becoming the first Syrian prime minister to visit the country since the Gulf War. In December 2001, in an effort to stimulate economic reform, Mero was charged with forming a new cabinet, which saw extensive reorganization with several "pro-reform" ministers appointed to strategic portfolios related to the economy. His premiership also oversaw improving ties with Turkey. In July 2003, Mero became the first Syrian prime minister to visit Turkey in 17 years, where he signed three agreements on health, oil and natural gas, and customs matters.

Mero resigned from office in early September 2003, reportedly due to the stagnation of the process of economic reform. Parliament speaker Mohammed Naji Al Otari replaced him as prime minister. Mero continued his political career as a member of the central committee of the Ba'ath Party. His term ended in June 2005, and he retired from politics.

== Death ==
Mero died from COVID-19 in Al-Tall, on 22 December 2020, during the COVID-19 pandemic in Syria. He was 79 years old.

== See also ==
- Second Mustafa Mero government
