= Syria =

Country in West Asia

Syrian Arab Republic: اَلْجُمْهُورِيَّةُ ٱلْعَرَبِيَّةُ ٱلْسُوْرِيَّة (Arabic) al-Jumhūriyyah al-ʿArabiyyah as-Sūriyyah
- Flag Emblem
- Anthem: حُمَاةَ الدِّيَارِ "Ḥumāt ad-Diyār"; Guardians of the Homeland (de jure) (Note: After the fall of the Ba'athist regime, the anthem was briefly relinquished. However, on 18 January 2025, a de facto new anthem, In Pursuit of Glory, was played during a football match after the Syrian Football Association notified FIFA that it would be using a new anthem. Since then, it has remained unclear whether the anthem will continue to be used. In March 2025, President Ahmed al-Sharaa signed the Constitutional Declaration, whose Article 5 states that the national anthem shall be determined by law.) فِي سَبِيلِ المَجد "Fī Sabīli al-Majd"; In Pursuit of Glory (de facto)
- Location of Syria Israeli-occupied territories
- Capital and largest city: Damascus; 33°30′N 36°18′E
- Official languages: Arabic
- Recognized national languages: Kurdish (Note: Per Decree No. 13 of 2026)
- Spoken languages: Predominantly Arabic; List: Kurdish; Turkish; Neo-Aramaic; Syriac; Circassian; Chechen; Armenian; Greek; Domari
- Ethnic groups (2021): 80–90% Arabs; 9–10% Kurds; 1–10% others
- Religion (2020): 94.17% Islam (Note: Syria does not have a state religion. However, the president is required to be a Muslim and Islamic law is the main source of jurisprudence."Constitutional Declaration of the Syrian Arab Republic" (PDF). ConstitutionNet. Archived from the original (PDF) on 18 March 2025.); 79.19% Sunni; 14.1% Shia; 10–13% Alawites; 3.84% Christianity; 1.99% other
- Demonym: Syrian
- Government: Unitary presidential republic under a provisional government
  - President: Ahmed al-Sharaa
  - Speaker: Abdul Hamid al-Awak
  - Court President: Issam al-Khalif
- Legislature: People's Assembly

Establishment
  - Arab Kingdom of Syria: 8 March 1920
  - State of Syria under the French Mandate: 1 December 1924
  - First Syrian Republic: 14 May 1930
  - End of the French Mandate: 17 April 1946
  - Part of the United Arab Republic: 22 February 1958 – 28 September 1961
  - Ba'athist Syria: 8 March 1963 – 8 December 2024
  - Transitional period under a transitional government: 8 December 2024
  - Constitutional Declaration adopted: 13 March 2025

Area
  - Total: 185,180 km^{2} (71,500 sq mi) (87th)
  - Water (%): 1.1

Population
  - 2026 estimate: ▲26,657,437 (56th)
  - Density: 118.3/km^{2} (306.4/sq mi) (70th)
- GDP (PPP): 2022 estimate
  - Total: ▲$110.2 billion (100th)
  - Per capita: ▲$4,905
- GDP (nominal): 2022 estimate
  - Total: ▲$23.74 billion
  - Per capita: ▲$1,057
- Gini (2022): ▼26.6 low inequality
- HDI (2023): ▼0.564 medium (162nd)
- Currency: Syrian pound (SYP/LS)
- Time zone: UTC+03:00 (AST)
- Date format: dd-mm-yyyy
- Calling code: +963
- ISO 3166 code: SY
- Internet TLD: .sy سوريا.

Syria, (Note: Arabic: سُورِيَا, romanized: Sūriyā or سُورِيَة, Sūriyah; locally: [ˈsuːrja]; Kurdish: Sûrî or Sûriye) officially the Syrian Arab Republic, (Note: Arabic: اَلْجُمْهُورِيَّةُ ٱلْعَرَبِيَّةُ ٱلْسُوْرِيَّة, romanized: al-Jumhūriyyah al-ʿArabiyyah as-Sūriyyah; Kurdish: Komara Erebî ya Sûrîyê) is a country in West Asia located in the Eastern Mediterranean and the Levant. It borders the Mediterranean Sea to the west, Turkey to the north and northwest, Iraq to the east and southeast, Jordan to the south, and Israel and Lebanon to the southwest. It is a republic under a provisional government and comprises 14 governorates. Damascus is Syria's capital and largest city. With a population of 26 million across an area of 185,180 square kilometres (71,500 sq mi), it is the 56th-most populous and 87th-largest country.

The name "Syria" historically referred to the region of Syria, or known as Greater Syria and Syria-Palestine. The modern state encompasses the sites of several ancient kingdoms and empires, including the Eblan civilization. Damascus was the capital of the Umayyad Empire and later became an important political and administrative center, alongside Aleppo, under the Ayyubid and Mamluk Sultanates and the Ottoman Empire. The modern Syrian state was established in the mid-20th century after centuries of Ottoman rule, as a French Mandate. The state represented the largest Arab state to emerge from the formerly Ottoman-ruled Syrian provinces. It gained de jure independence as a parliamentary republic in 1945 when the First Syrian Republic became a founding member of the United Nations, an act which legally ended the French Mandate. French troops withdrew in April 1946, granting the nation de facto independence. The post-independence period was tumultuous, with multiple coups and coup attempts between 1949 and 1971. In 1958, Syria entered a brief pan-Arab union with Egypt, which was terminated following a 1961 coup d'état. The 1963 coup d'état carried out by the military committee of the Ba'ath Party established a one-party state, which ran Syria under martial law from 1963 to 2011. Internal power-struggles within Ba'athist factions caused further coups in 1966 and 1970, the latter of which saw Hafez al-Assad come to power. Under Assad, Syria became a hereditary dictatorship. Assad died in 2000, and he was succeeded by his son, Bashar.

During the Arab Spring in 2011, members of the Syrian opposition organized protests against the Assad regime, which became known as the Syrian Revolution. After the government responded with lethal violence, the Free Syrian Army was formed, and the revolution escalated into a multifaceted 13-year civil war, drawing in several countries and triggering a refugee crisis that displaced more than 6 million people. Rebel advances were reversed following the emergence of the Islamic State, which occupied roughly two-thirds of Syria by May 2015. Alongside rebel and government counteroffensives, several countries led a campaign that resulted in the Islamic State's territorial defeat in 2017. Following its defeat in the four-year Battle of Aleppo, the Free Syrian Army fragmented and declined.

By 2020, the civil war had become a frozen conflict, while Hay'at Tahrir al-Sham (HTS) consolidated the remaining rebel groups in its stronghold in northwestern Syria. In late 2024, HTS and other opposition forces launched a series of offensives, culminating in the fall of Damascus and the fall of the Assad regime on 8 December 2024. The Syrian caretaker government was established following the fall of the Assad regime under Ahmed al-Sharaa, who became Syria's de facto head of state and was formally appointed president of Syria at the Syrian Revolution Victory Conference on 29 January 2025. The caretaker government remained in place until it was replaced by the Syrian transitional government in March 2025. Post-war conflict has continued following the fall of the Assad regime, involving clashes with Assad loyalists, Alawite and Druze insurgents, the former Syrian Democratic Forces, and Israeli forces.

Syria is a unitary presidential republic currently undergoing a political transition. It is governed by the Syrian transitional government under the Constitutional Declaration, with executive authority vested in the president, while the People's Assembly serves as the unicameral legislature and judicial power is vested in an independent judiciary. Syria is a developing country with a mixed economy. Its economy was primarily based on agriculture in its early years but deteriorated following the outbreak of the Syrian civil war in 2011. A country of fertile plains, high mountains, plateaus, and deserts, Syria is home to diverse ethnic and religious groups. Levantine Arabs are the largest ethnic group, while Sunni Muslims constitute the largest religious group. Syria is a founding member of the United Nations and the Arab League, and is a member of numerous international organisations. It is also home to six UNESCO World Heritage Sites.

== Etymology ==
Several sources indicate that the name Syria is borrowed from the Ancient Greek name Σύριοι Sýrioi, or Σύροι Sýroi, which is in turn borrowed from Luwian sura/i- (attested in the 8th century BC), and ultimately derived from Aššūr (Assyria) in northern Mesopotamia (present-day Iraq and north-eastern Syria). However, from the Seleucid Empire (323–150 BC), this term was also applied to the Levant, and from this point the Greeks applied the term without distinction between the Assyrians of Mesopotamia and Arameans of the Levant. Mainstream modern academic opinion strongly favors the argument that the Greek word is related to Ἀσσυρία Assyria, ultimately borrowed from Akkadian Aššur. The Greek name appears to correspond to Phoenician ʾšr 'Assur', ʾšrym 'Assyrians', recorded in the Çineköy inscription (dated to the 8th century BC), where Luwian sura/i- is also attested.

The area designated by the word has changed over time. Classically, Syria lies at the eastern end of the Mediterranean, between Arabia to the south and Asia Minor to the north, stretching inland to include parts of Iraq, and having an uncertain border to the northeast that Pliny the Elder describes as including, from west to east, Commagene, Sophene, and Adiabene.

By Pliny's time, however, this larger Syria had been divided into a number of provinces under the Roman Empire (but politically independent from each other): Judaea, later renamed Palaestina in AD 135 (the region corresponding to modern-day Israel, the Palestinian territories, and Jordan) in the extreme southwest; Phoenice (established in 194) corresponding to modern Lebanon, Damascus and Homs regions; Coele-Syria (or "Hollow Syria") and south of the Eleutheris river.

== History ==
=== Ancient antiquity ===
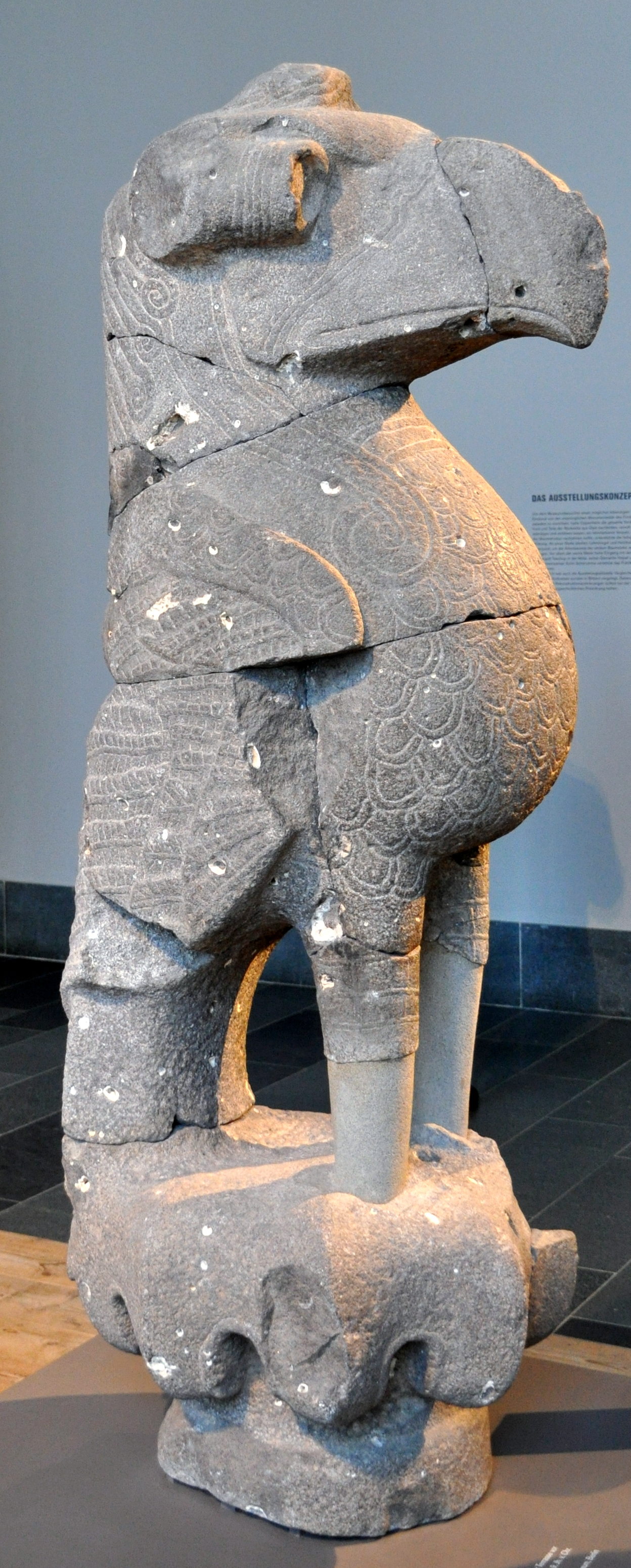
Reconstructed sculpture of a bird from Tell Halaf

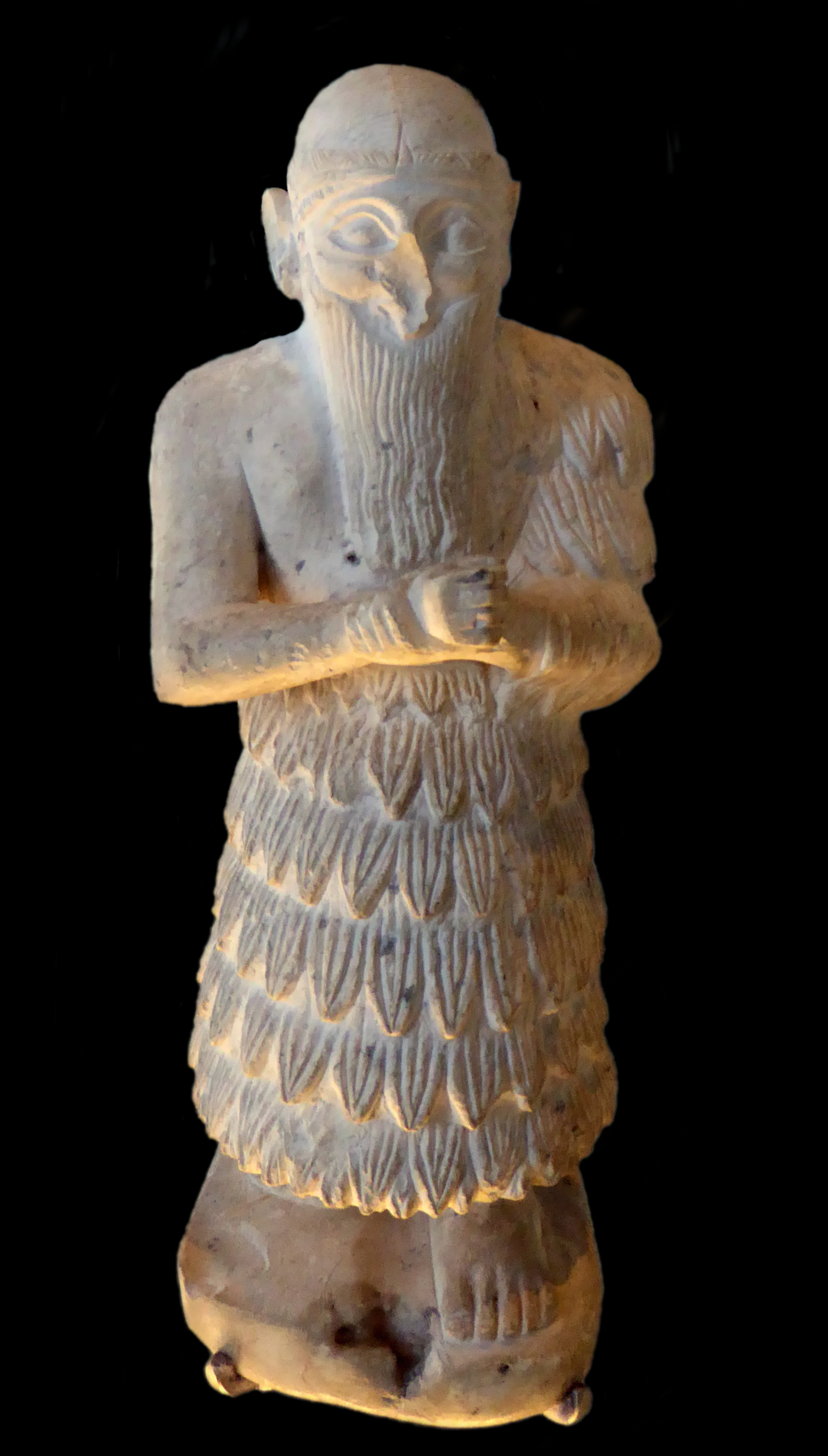
Ishqi-Mari, king of the Second Kingdom of Mari, circa 2300 BC

The Natufian culture was the first to become sedentary around the 11th millennium BC and became one of the centers of Neolithic culture (known as Pre-Pottery Neolithic A), where agriculture and cattle breeding first began to appear. The site of Tell Qaramel has several round stone towers dated to 10650 BC, making them the oldest structures of this kind in the world. The Neolithic period (Pre-Pottery Neolithic B) is represented by rectangular houses of Mureybet culture. At the time, people used containers made of stone, gyps, and burnt lime (Vaisselle blanche). The discovery of obsidian tools from Anatolia are evidence of early trade. The ancient cities of Hamoukar and Emar played an important role during the late Neolithic and Bronze Age. Archaeologists have demonstrated that civilization in Syria was one of the most ancient on earth, perhaps preceded by only that of Mesopotamia.

The earliest recorded indigenous civilization in the region was the Kingdom of Ebla near present-day Idlib, northern Syria. Ebla appears to have been founded around 3500 BC and gradually built its fortune through trade with the Mesopotamian states of Sumer, Assyria, and Akkad, as well as with the Hurrian and Hattian peoples to the northwest, in Asia Minor. Gifts from Pharaohs, found during excavations, confirm Ebla's contact with Egypt. One of the earliest written texts from Syria is a trading agreement between Vizier Ibrium of Ebla and an ambiguous kingdom called Abarsal c. 2300 BC. This is known as the Treaty between Ebla and Abarsal. Scholars believe the language of Ebla to be among the oldest known written Semitic languages after Akkadian. Recent classifications of the Eblaite language have shown that it was an East Semitic language, closely related to the Akkadian language. Ebla was weakened by a long war with Mari, and the whole of Syria became part of the Mesopotamian Akkadian Empire after Sargon of Akkad and his grandson Naram-Sin's conquests ended Eblan domination over Syria in the first half of the 23rd century BC. The Yazidi people have also lived in modern-day Syria since ancient times.

By the 21st century BC, Hurrians settled in the northern east parts of Syria while the rest of the region was dominated by the Amorites. Syria was called the Land of the Amurru (Amorites) by their Assyro-Babylonian neighbors. The Northwest Semitic Amorite language is the earliest attested of the Canaanite languages. Mari reemerged during this period until conquered by Hammurabi of Babylon. Ugarit also arose during this time, circa 1800 BC, close to modern Latakia. Ugaritic was a Semitic language loosely related to the Canaanite languages and developed the Ugaritic alphabet, considered to be the world's earliest known alphabet. The Ugaritic kingdom survived until its destruction at the hands of the marauding Indo-European Sea Peoples in the 12th century BC in what was known as the Late Bronze Age collapse.

Aleppo and Damascus are among the oldest continuously inhabited cities in the world. Yamhad (modern Aleppo) dominated northern Syria for two centuries, although eastern Syria was occupied in the 19th and 18th centuries BC by the Kingdom of Upper Mesopotamia ruled by the Amorite dynasty of Shamshi-Adad I, and by the Babylonian Empire which was founded by Amorites. Yamhad was described in the tablets of Mari as the mightiest state in the near east and as having more vassals than Hammurabi. Yamhad imposed its authority over Alalakh, Qatna, the Hurrians states, and the Euphrates valley down to the borders with Babylon. The army of Yamhad campaigned as far away as Dēr on the border of Elam (modern Iran). Yamhad was conquered and destroyed, along with Ebla, by the Hittites from Asia Minor circa 1600 BC. From this time, Syria became a battle ground for various foreign empires, these being the Hittite Empire, Mitanni Empire, Egyptian Empire, Middle Assyrian Empire, and to a lesser degree Babylonia. The Egyptians initially occupied much of the south, while the Hittites and the Mitanni occupied much of the north. However, Assyria eventually gained the upper hand, destroying the Mitanni Empire and annexing huge swathes of territory previously held by the Hittites and Babylon.

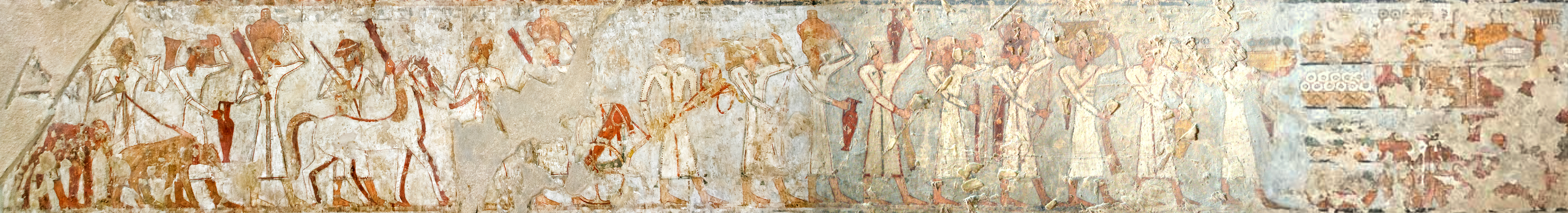
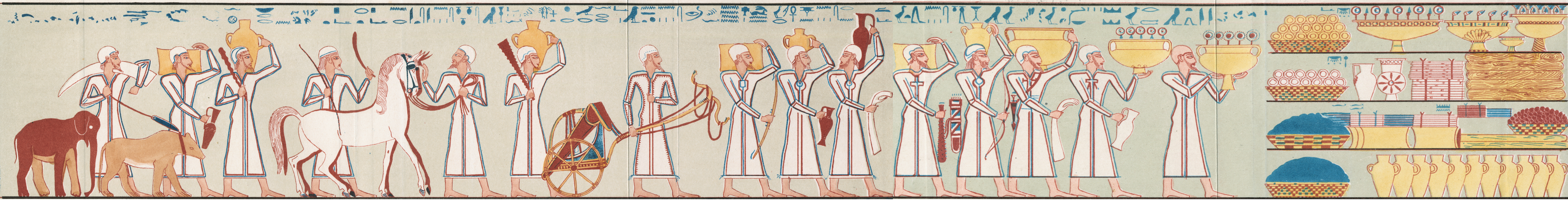
Syrians bringing presents to Pharaoh Tuthmosis III, as depicted in the tomb of Rekhmire, circa 1450 BCE (actual painting and interpretational drawing). They are labeled "Chiefs of Retjenu".

Around the 14th century BC, various Semitic people appeared in the area, such as the semi-nomadic Suteans who came into an unsuccessful conflict with Babylonia to the east, and the West Semitic speaking Arameans who subsumed the earlier Amorites. They too were subjugated by Assyria and the Hittites for centuries. The Egyptians fought the Hittites for control over western Syria; the fighting reached its zenith in 1274 BC with the Battle of Kadesh. The west remained part of the Hittite empire until its destruction c. 1200 BC, while eastern Syria largely became part of the Middle Assyrian Empire, who also annexed much of the west during the reign of Tiglath-Pileser I 1114–1076 BC. With the destruction of the Hittites and the decline of Assyria in the late 11th century BC, the Aramean tribes gained control of much of the interior, founding states such as Bit Bahiani, Aram-Damascus, Hamath, Aram-Rehob, Aram-Naharaim, and Luhuti. From this point, the region became known as Aramea or Aram. There was also a synthesis between the Semitic Arameans and the remnants of the Indo-European Hittites, with the founding of a number of Syro-Hittite states centered in north central Aram (Syria) and south central Asia Minor (modern Turkey), including Palistin, Carchemish and Sam'al.

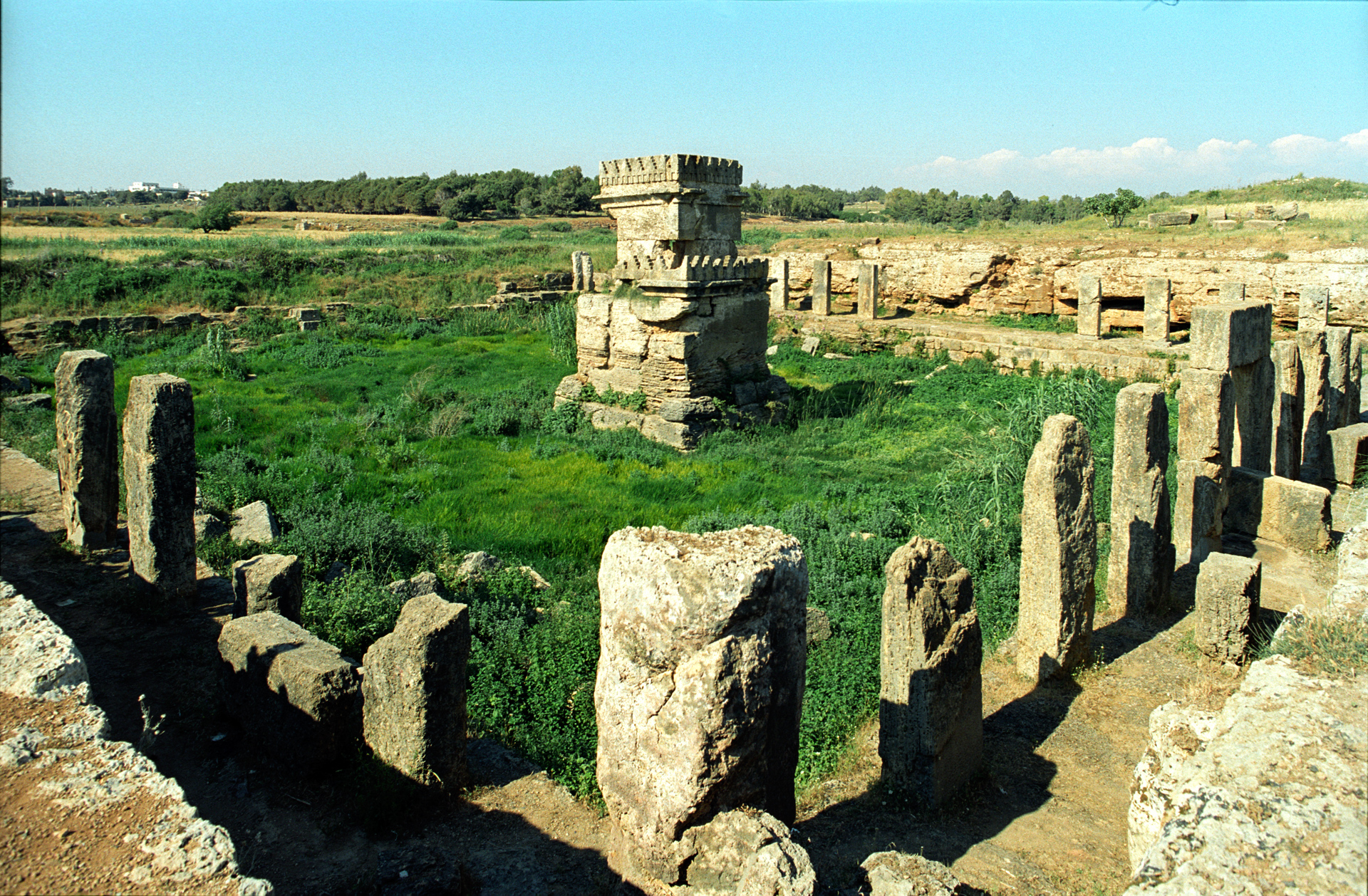
Amrit Phoenician Temple

A Canaanite group known as the Phoenicians came to dominate the coasts of Syria, (and also Lebanon and northern Palestine) from the 13th century BC, founding city states such as Amrit, Simyra, Arwad, Paltos, Ramitha, and Shuksi. From these coastal regions, they eventually spread their influence throughout the Mediterranean, including building colonies in Malta, Sicily, the Iberian peninsula, and the coasts of North Africa and most significantly, founding the major city-state of Carthage in the 9th century BC, which was much later to become the center of a major empire, rivaling the Roman Republic.

Syria and the western half of Near East then fell to the vast Neo Assyrian Empire (911 BC – 605 BC). The Assyrians introduced Imperial Aramaic as the lingua franca of their empire. This language was to remain dominant in Syria and the entire Near East until after the Islamic conquest in the 7th and 8th centuries AD, and was to be a vehicle for the spread of Christianity. The Assyrians named their colonies of Syria and Lebanon Eber-Nari. Assyrian domination ended after the Assyrians greatly weakened themselves in a series of brutal internal civil wars, followed by attacks from: the Medes, Babylonians, Chaldeans, Persians, Scythians and Cimmerians. During the fall of Assyria, the Scythians ravaged and plundered much of Syria. The last stand of the Assyrian army was at Carchemish in northern Syria in 605 BC. The Assyrian Empire was followed by the Neo-Babylonian Empire (605 BC – 539 BC). During this period, Syria became a battle ground between Babylonia and another former Assyrian colony, that of Egypt. The Babylonians, like their Assyrian relations, were victorious over Egypt.

=== Classical antiquity ===
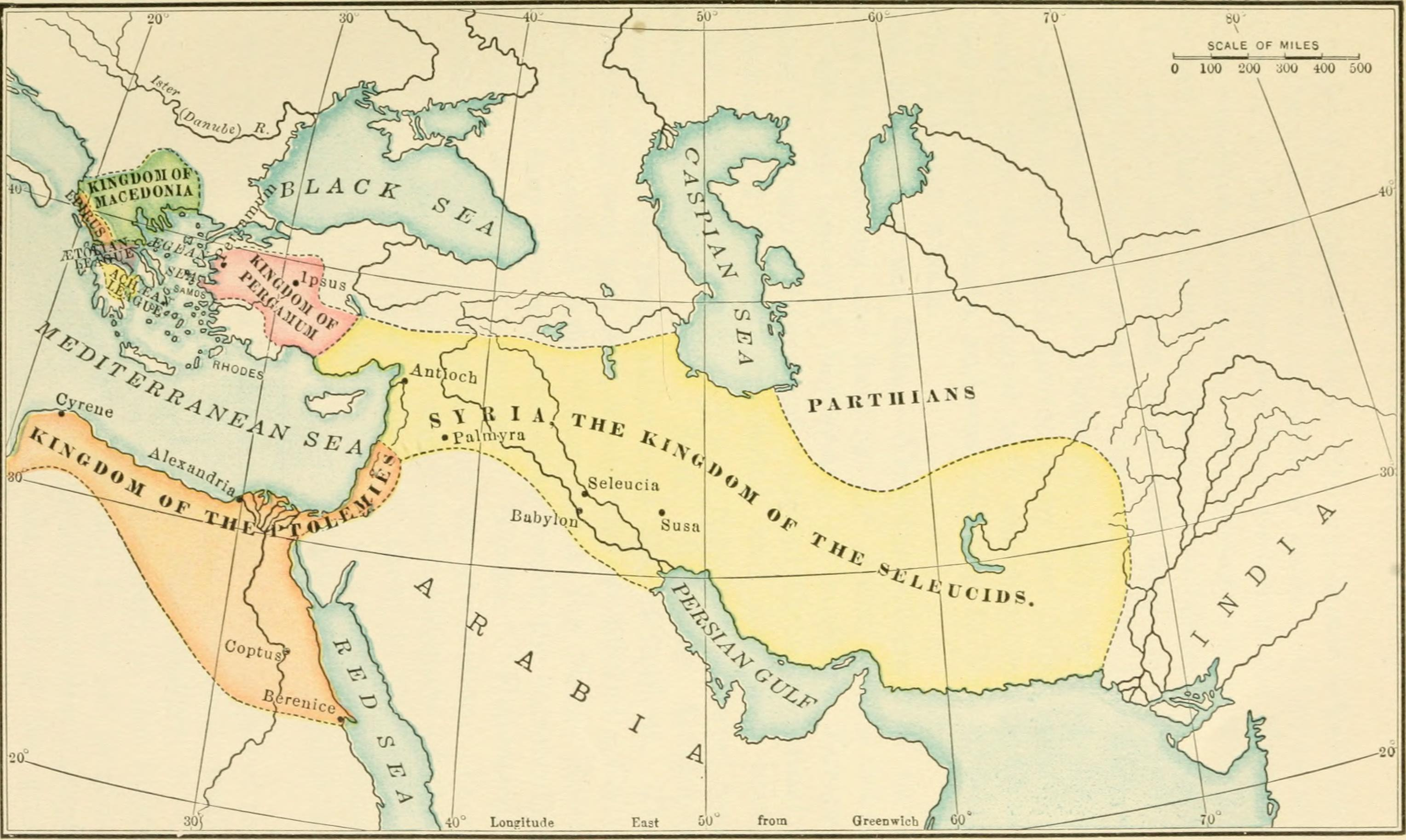
Antioch in Syria became the capital of the Hellenistic Seleucid Empire in 240 BC

Lands that constitute modern-day Syria were part of the Neo-Babylonian Empire and had been annexed by the Achaemenid Empire in 539 BC. Led by Cyrus the Great, the Achaemenid Persians retained Imperial Aramaic as one of the diplomatic languages of their empire, as well as the Assyrian name for the new satrapy of Aram/Syria Eber-Nari. Syria was conquered by the Macedonian Empire which was ruled by Alexander the Great c. 330 BC and consequently became Coele-Syria province of the Seleucid Empire (323 BC – 64 BC), with the Seleucid kings styling themselves "King of Syria" and the city of Antioch being its capital starting from 240 BC. Thus, it was the Greeks who introduced the name "Syria" to the region. Originally an Indo-European corruption of "Assyria" in northern Mesopotamia (Iraq), the Greeks used this term to describe not only Assyria itself but also the lands to the west which had for centuries been under Assyrian dominion. Thus in the Greco-Roman world both the Arameans of Syria and the Assyrians of Mesopotamia (modern day Iraq) to the east were referred to as "Syrians" or "Syriacs", despite these being distinct peoples in their own right, a confusion which would continue into the modern world. Eventually parts of southern Seleucid Syria were taken by the Jewish Hasmonean dynasty upon the slow disintegration of the Hellenistic Empire.

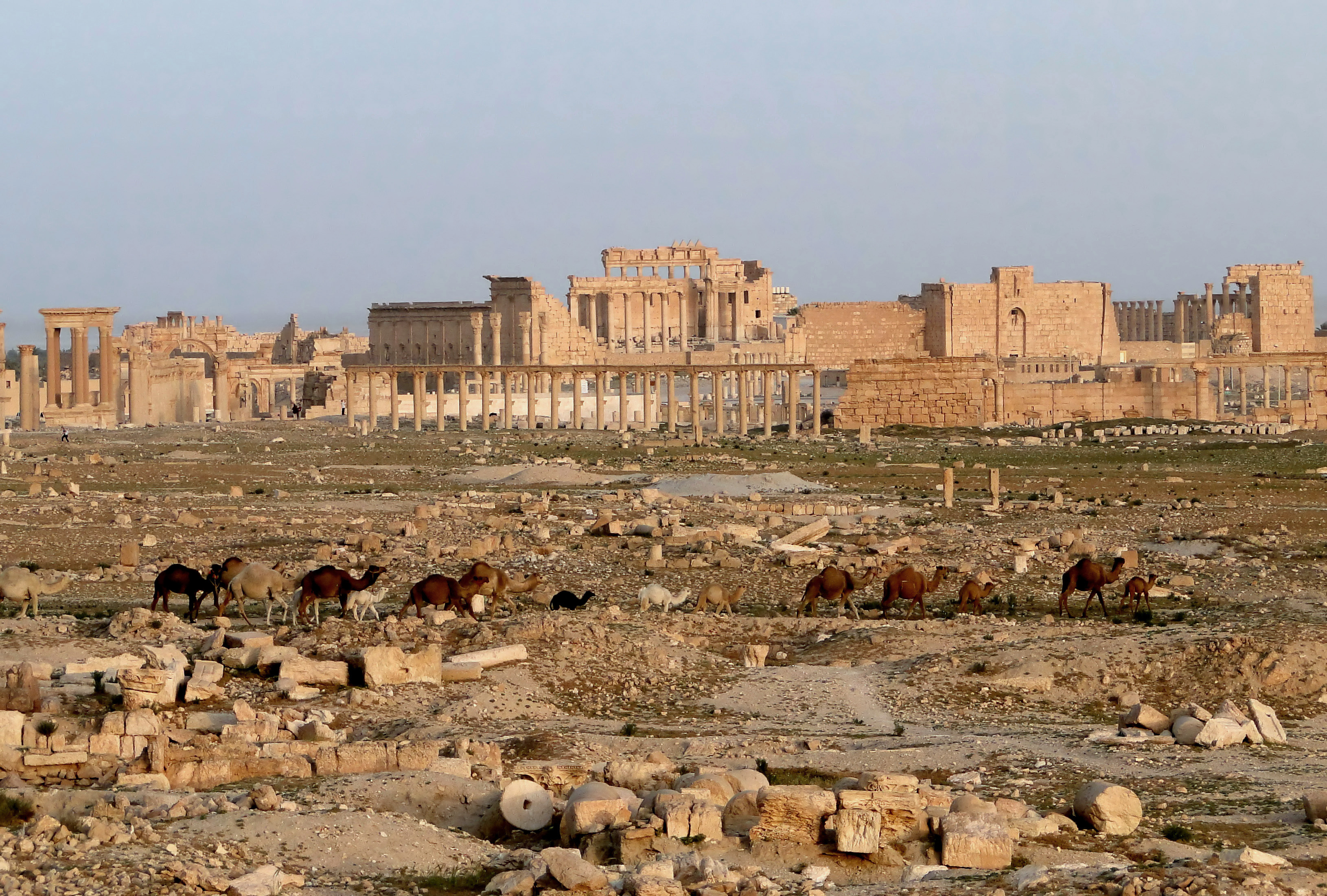
Ancient city of Palmyra before the war

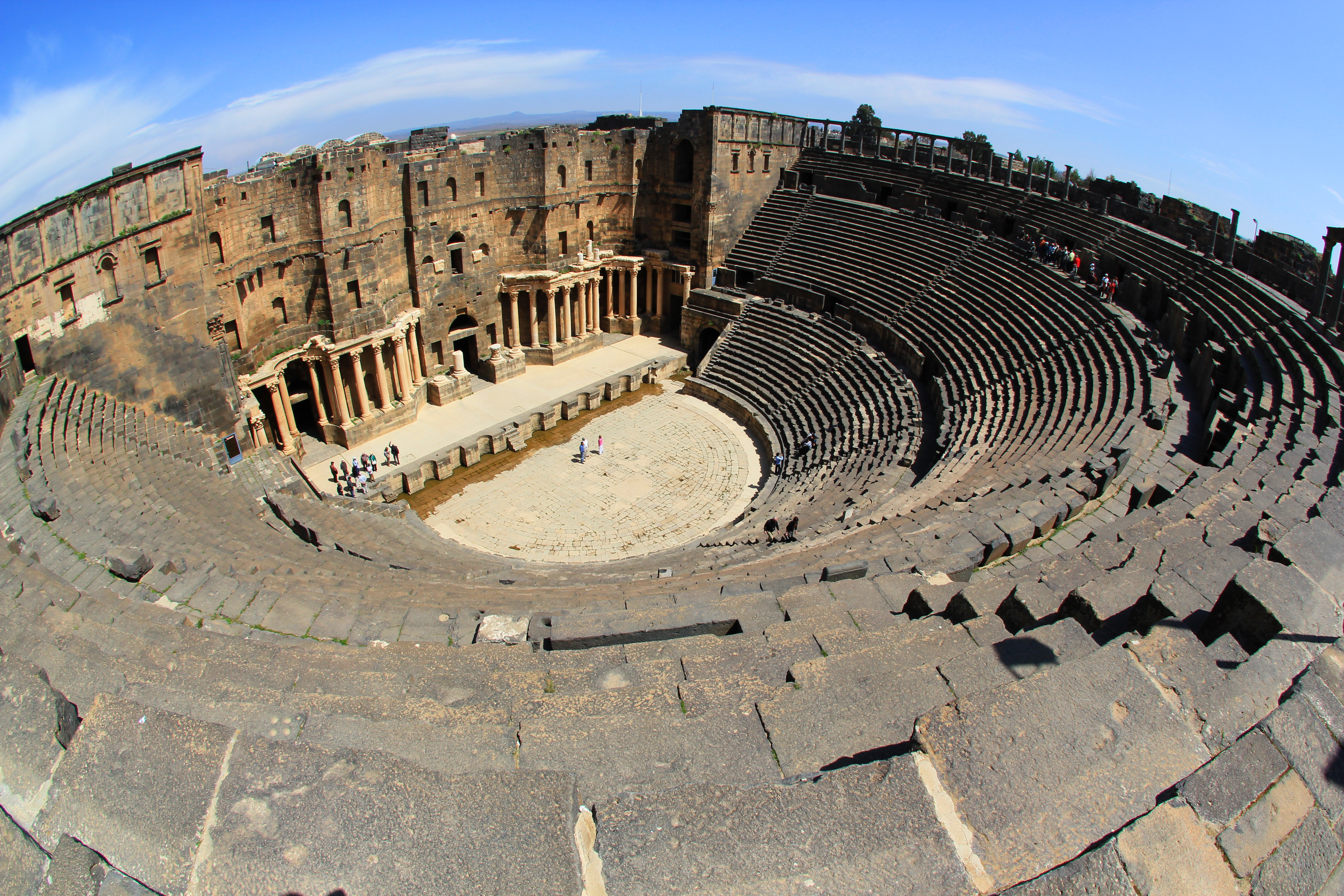
Roman Theatre at Bosra in the province of Arabia, present-day Syria

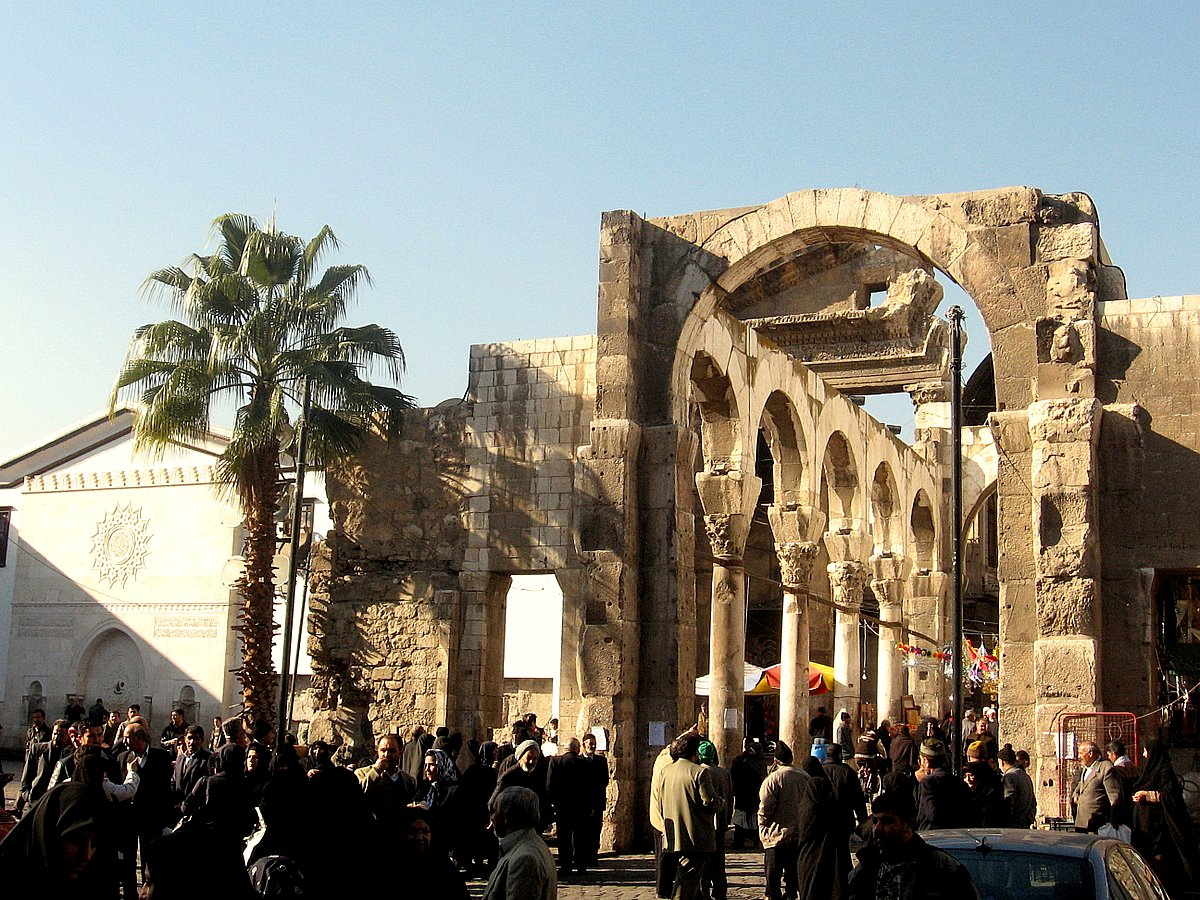
Temple of Jupiter, Damascus

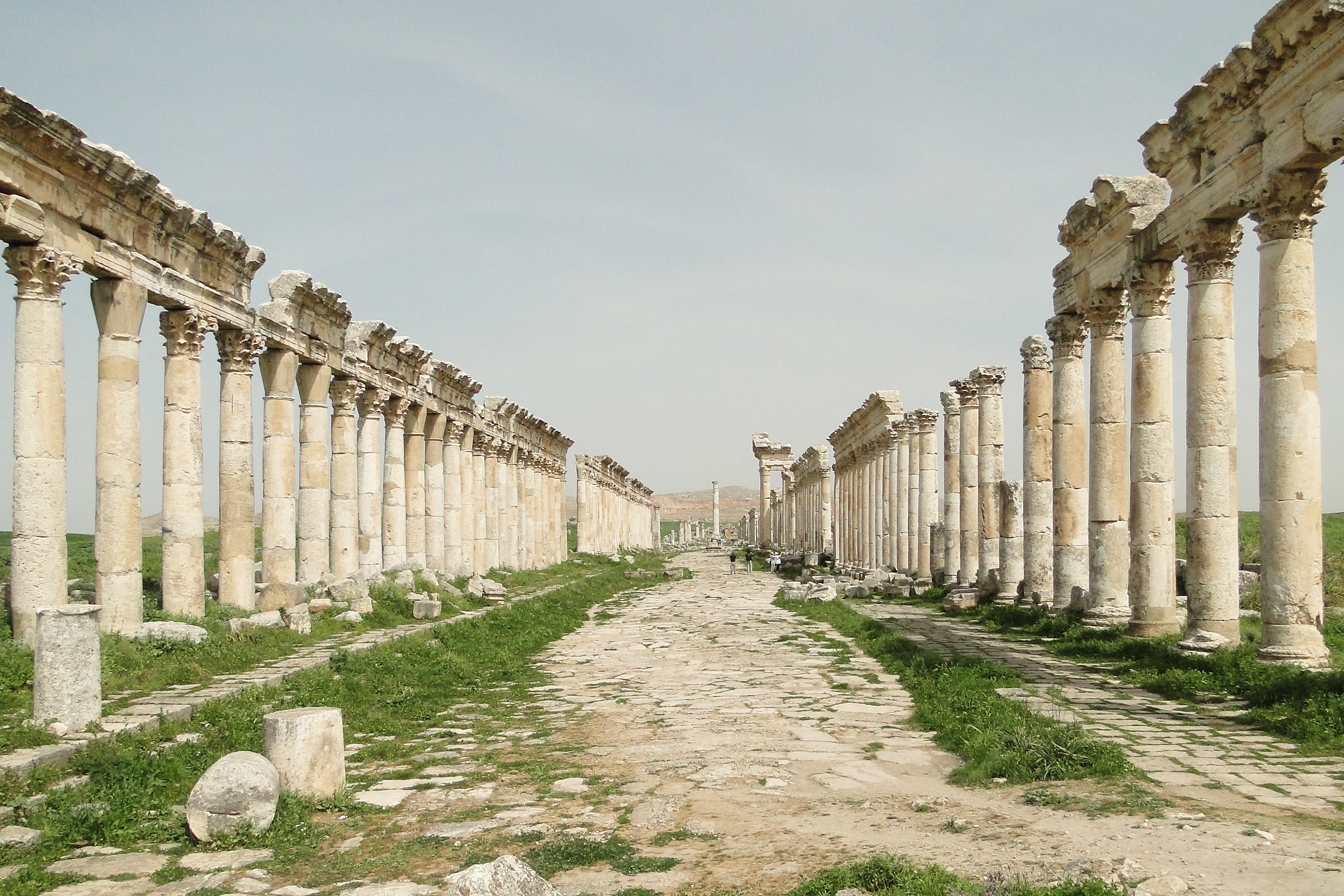
Apamea, one of Syria's most prosperous cities in classical antiquity

Syria briefly came under Armenian control from 83 BC, with the conquests of the Armenian king Tigranes the Great, who was welcomed as a savior from the Seleucids and Romans by the Syrian people. However, Pompey the Great, a general of the Roman Empire, rode to Syria and captured Antioch and turned Syria into a Roman province in 64 BC, thus ending Armenian control over the region which had lasted two decades. Syria prospered under Roman rule, being strategically located on the Silk Road, which gave it massive wealth and importance, making it the battleground for the rivaling Romans and Persians. Palmyra, a rich and sometimes powerful native Aramaic-speaking kingdom, arose in northern Syria in the 2nd century; the Palmyrene established a trade network that made the city one of the richest in the Roman Empire. In the late 3rd century the Palmyrene king Odaenathus defeated the Persian emperor Shapur I and controlled the entirety of the Roman East while his successor and widow Zenobia established the Palmyrene Empire, which briefly conquered Egypt, Syria, Palestine, much of Asia Minor, Judah and Lebanon, before being finally brought under Roman control in 273.

The northern Mesopotamian Assyrian kingdom of Adiabene controlled areas of north east Syria between 10 and 117, before it was conquered by Rome. The Aramaic language has been found as far afield as Hadrian's Wall in Roman Britain, with an inscription written by a Palmyrene emigrant at the site of Fort Arbeia. Control of Syria eventually passed from the Romans to the Byzantines with the split in the Roman Empire. The largely Aramaic-speaking population of Syria during the heyday of the Byzantine Empire was probably not exceeded again until the 19th century. Prior to the Arab Islamic Conquest in the 7th century, the bulk of the population were Arameans, but Syria was also home to Greek and Roman ruling classes, Assyrians still dwelt in the north east, Phoenicians along the coasts, and Jewish and Armenian communities were also extant in major cities, with Nabateans and pre-Islamic Arabs such as the Lakhmids and Ghassanids dwelling in the deserts of southern Syria. Syriac Christianity had taken hold as the major religion, although others still followed Judaism, Mithraism, Manicheanism, Greco-Roman Religion, Canaanite Religion and Mesopotamian Religion. Syria's large and prosperous population made Syria one of the most important of the Roman and Byzantine provinces, particularly during the 2nd and 3rd centuries AD.

Syrians held considerable power during the Severan dynasty. The matriarch of the family and empress of Rome as wife of emperor Septimius Severus was Julia Domna, a Syrian from the city of Emesa (modern day Homs), whose family held hereditary rights to the priesthood of the god El-Gabal. Her great nephews, also Arabs from Syria, would also become Roman emperors, the first being Elagabalus and the second his cousin Alexander Severus. Another Roman emperor who was a Syrian was Philip the Arab (Marcus Julius Philippus), who was born in Roman Arabia. He was emperor from 244 to 249 and ruled briefly during the Crisis of the Third Century. During his reign, he focused on his home town of Philippopolis (modern day Shahba) and began many construction projects to improve the city, most of which were halted after his death. Syria is significant in the history of Christianity; Saul of Tarsus, better known as the Apostle Paul, was converted on the road to Damascus and emerged as a significant figure in the Christian Church at Antioch in ancient Syria.

=== Middle Ages ===
The Umayyad Mosque in Damascus built by Caliph Al-Walid I followed the plan of the Prophet's Mosque in Medina, and became the earliest example of a congregational mosque that served as standard for future mosques

Muhammad's first interaction with the people of Syria was during the invasion of Dumatul Jandal in July 626 where he ordered his followers to invade Duma, because Muhammad received intelligence that some tribes there were involved in highway robbery and were preparing to attack Medina. William Montgomery Watt claims that this was the most significant expedition Muhammad ordered at the time, even though it received little notice in the primary sources. Dumat Al-Jandal was 800 kilometres (500 mi) from Medina, and Watt says that there was no immediate threat to Muhammad, other than the possibility that his communications to Syria and supplies to Medina would be interrupted. Watt says "It is tempting to suppose that Muhammad was already envisaging something of the expansion which took place after his death", and that the rapid march of his troops must have "impressed all those who heard of it". William Muir also believes that the expedition was important as Muhammad followed by 1,000 men reached the confines of Syria, where distant tribes had learnt his name, while the political horizon of Muhammad was extended.

Umayyad Caliphate (green) with its capital in Damascus around 740

By 640, Syria was conquered by the Rashidun army led by Khalid ibn al-Walid. In the mid-7th century, the Umayyad dynasty placed the capital of the empire in Damascus. The country's power declined during later Umayyad rule; this was mainly through totalitarianism, corruption and the resulting revolutions. The Umayyad dynasty was overthrown in 750 by the Abbasid dynasty, which moved the capital of empire to Baghdad. Arabic – made official under Umayyad rule – became the dominant language, replacing Greek and Aramaic of the Byzantine era. In 887, the Egypt-based Tulunids annexed Syria from the Abbasids and were later replaced by the Egypt-based Ikhshidids and then by the Hamdanids originating in Aleppo founded by Sayf al-Dawla.

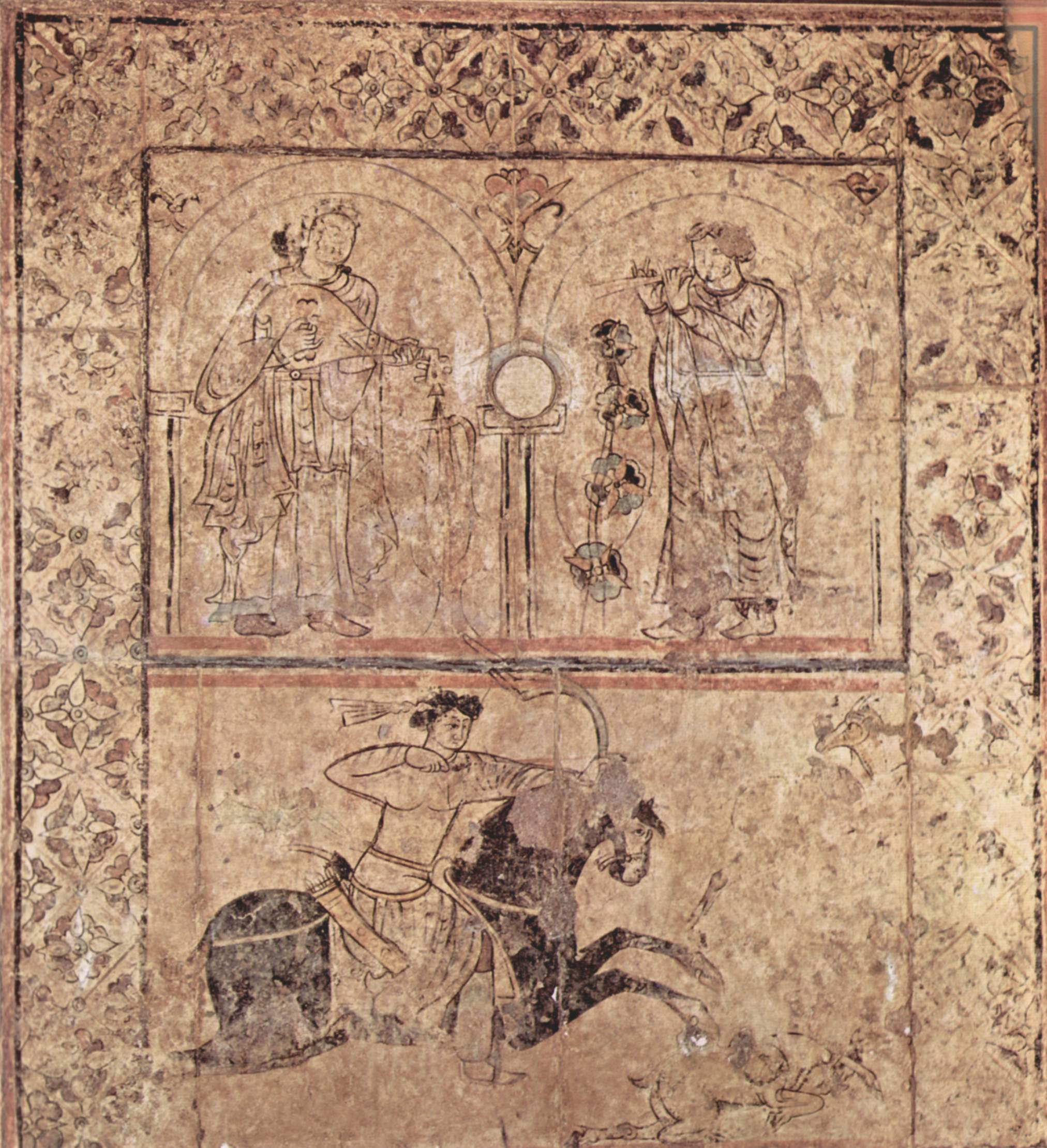
Umayyad fresco from Qasr al-Hayr al-Gharbî, built in the early 7th century

Sections of Syria were held by French, English, Italian and German overlords between 1098 and 1189 during the Crusades and were known collectively as the Crusader states, among which the primary one in Syria was the Principality of Antioch. The coastal mountainous region was occupied in part by the Nizari Ismailis, the so-called Assassins, who had intermittent confrontations and truces with the Crusader States. Later in history when "the Nizaris faced renewed Frankish hostilities, they received timely assistance from the Ayyubids." After a century of Seljuk rule, Syria was largely conquered (1175–1185) by the Kurdish liberator Salah ad-Din, founder of the Ayyubid dynasty of Egypt. Aleppo fell to the Mongols of Hulegu in January 1260; Damascus fell in March, but then Hulegu was forced to break off his attack to return to China to deal with a succession dispute.

A few months later, the Mamluks arrived with an army from Egypt and defeated the Mongols in the Battle of Ain Jalut in Galilee. The Mamluk leader, Baibars, made Damascus a provincial capital. When he died, power was taken by Qalawun. In the meantime, an emir named Sunqur al-Ashqar had tried to declare himself ruler of Damascus, but he was defeated by Qalawun on 21 June 1280 and fled to northern Syria. Al-Ashqar, who had married a Mongol woman, appealed for help from the Mongols. The Mongols of the Ilkhanate took Aleppo in October 1280, but Qalawun persuaded Al-Ashqar to join him, and they fought against the Mongols on 29 October 1281 in the Second Battle of Homs, which was won by the Mamluks. In 1400, the Muslim Turco-Mongol conqueror Tamurlane invaded Syria, in which he sacked Aleppo and captured Damascus after defeating the Mamluk army. The city's inhabitants were massacred, except for the artisans who were deported to Samarkand. Tamurlane conducted massacres of the Assyrian Christian population, greatly reducing their numbers. By the end of the 15th century, the discovery of a sea route from Europe to the Far East ended the need for an overland trade route through Syria.

=== Ottoman Syria ===
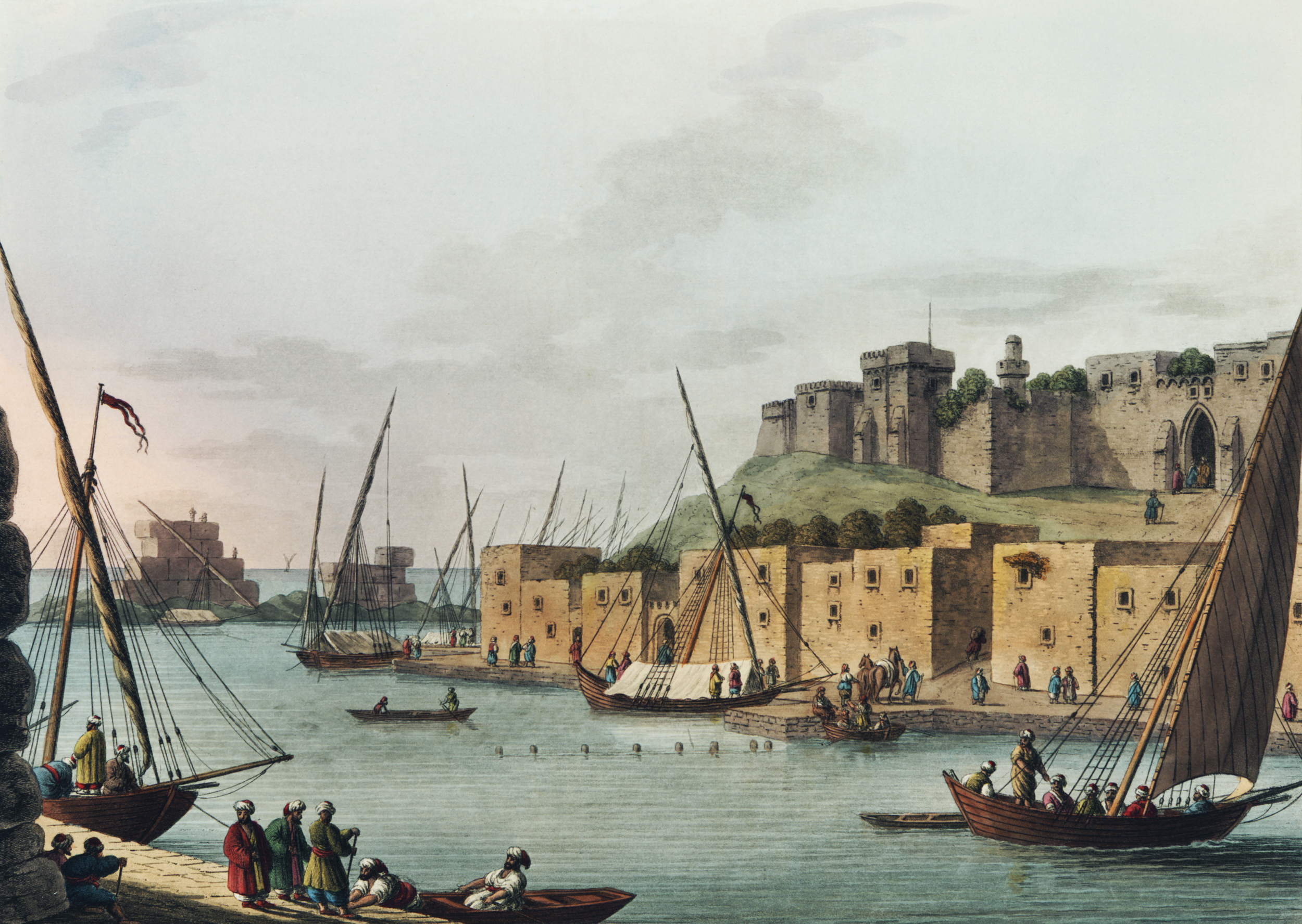
Tartus in Ottoman Syria, from an 1810 illustration by Luigi Mayer

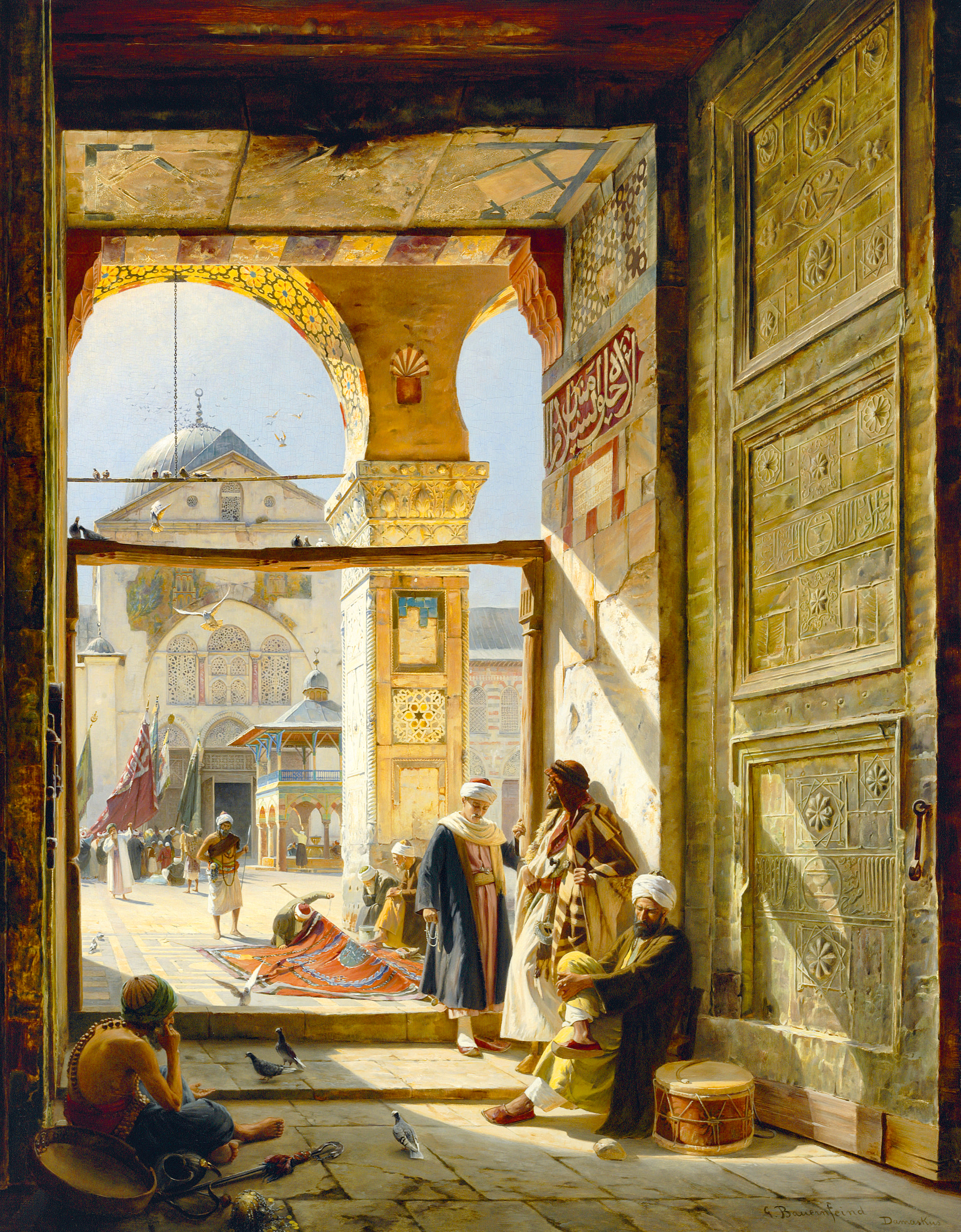
"The Gate Of The Great Umayyad Mosque, Damascus" by Gustav Bauernfeind, 1890

In 1516, the Ottoman Empire invaded the Mamluk Sultanate of Egypt, conquering Syria and incorporating it into its empire. The Ottoman system was not burdensome to Syrians because the Turks respected Arabic as the language of the Quran and accepted the mantle of defenders of the faith. Damascus was made the major entrepot for Mecca, and as such it acquired a holy character to Muslims, because of the beneficial results of the countless pilgrims who passed through on the hajj.

Ottoman administration followed a system that led to peaceful coexistence. Each ethno-religious minority—Arab Shia Muslim, Arab Sunni Muslim, Syriac Orthodox, Greek Orthodox, Maronite Christians, Assyrian Christians, Armenians, Kurds and Jews—constituted a millet. The religious heads of each community administered all personal status laws and performed certain civil functions as well. In 1831, Ibrahim Pasha of Egypt renounced his loyalty to the empire and overran Ottoman Syria, capturing Damascus. His short-term rule over the domain attempted to change the demographics and social structure of the region: he brought thousands of Egyptian villagers to populate the plains of southern Syria, rebuilt Jaffa and settled it with veteran Egyptian soldiers aiming to turn it into a regional capital, and he crushed peasant and Druze rebellions and deported non-loyal tribesmen. By 1840, however, he had to surrender the area back to the Ottomans. From 1864, Tanzimat reforms were applied on Ottoman Syria, carving out the provinces (vilayets) of Aleppo, Zor, Beirut and Damascus Vilayet; Mutasarrifate of Mount Lebanon was created, and soon after the Mutasarrifate of Jerusalem was given a separate status.

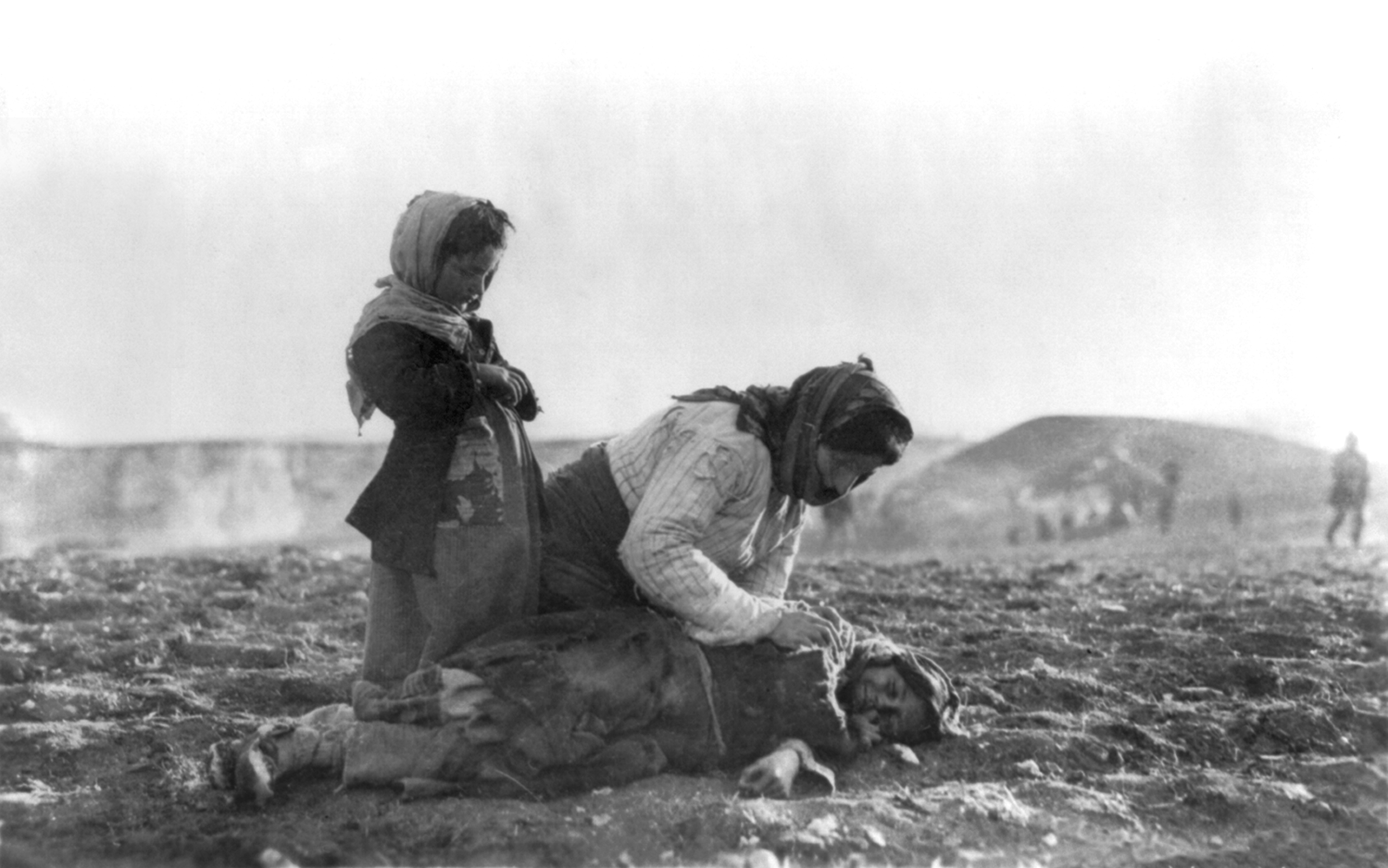
Armenian deportees near Aleppo during the Armenian genocide, 1915

During World War I, the Ottoman Empire entered the conflict as a Central Power. It ultimately suffered defeat and loss of control of the entire Near East to the British Empire and French Empire. During the conflict, genocide against indigenous Christian peoples was carried out by the Ottomans and their allies in the form of the Armenian genocide and Assyrian genocide, of which Deir ez-Zor in Ottoman Syria was the final destination of these death marches. In the midst of World War I, two Allied diplomats (Frenchman François Georges-Picot and Briton Mark Sykes) secretly agreed on the post-war division of the Ottoman Empire into respective zones of influence in the Sykes-Picot Agreement of 1916. Initially, the two territories were separated by a border that ran in an almost straight line from Jordan to Iran. However, the discovery of oil in the region of Mosul just before the end of the war led to yet another negotiation with France in 1918 to cede this region to the British zone of influence, which was to become Iraq. The fate of the intermediate province of Zor was left unclear; its occupation by Arab nationalists resulted in its attachment to Syria. This border was recognized internationally when Syria became a League of Nations mandate in 1920 and has not changed to date.

=== French Mandate ===
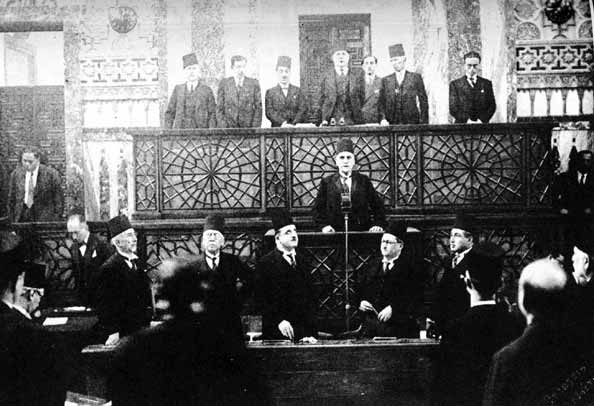
The inauguration of President Hashim al-Atassi in 1936

In 1920, a short-lived independent Kingdom of Syria was established under Faisal I of the Hashemite family. However, his rule over Syria ended after only a few months, following the Battle of Maysalun. French troops occupied Syria later that year after the San Remo conference proposed that the League of Nations put Syria under a French mandate. General Gouraud had according to his secretary de Caix two options: "Either build a Syrian nation that does not exist... by smoothing the rifts which still divide it" or "cultivate and maintain all the phenomena, which require our arbitration that these divisions give". De Caix added "I must say only the second option interests me". This is what Gouraud did.

In 1925, Sultan al-Atrash led a revolt that broke out in the Druze Mountain and spread to engulf the whole of Syria and parts of Lebanon. Al-Atrash won several battles against the French, notably the Battle of al-Kafr on 21 July 1925, the Battle of al-Mazraa on 2–3 August 1925, and the battles of Salkhad, al-Musayfirah and Sweida. France sent thousands of troops from Morocco and Senegal, leading the French to regain many cities, although resistance lasted until the spring of 1927. The French sentenced al-Atrash to death, but he had escaped with the rebels to Transjordan and was eventually pardoned. He returned to Syria in 1937 after the signing of the Syrian-French Treaty.

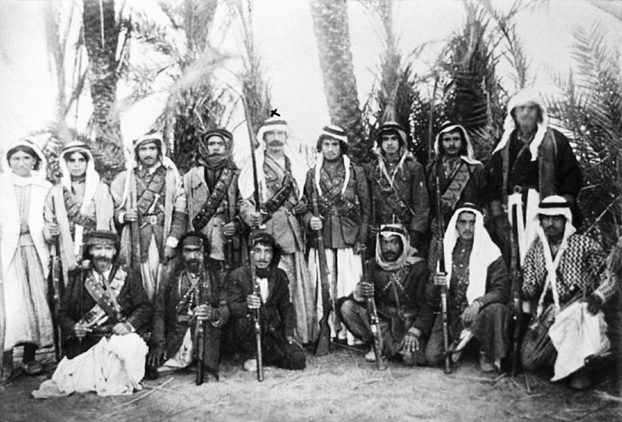
Syrian rebels in Ghouta during the Great Syrian Revolt against French colonial rule in the 1920s

Syria and France negotiated a treaty of independence in September 1936, and Hashim al-Atassi was the first president to be elected under the first incarnation of the modern republic of Syria. However, the treaty never came into force because the French Legislature refused to ratify it. With the fall of France in 1940 during World War II, Syria came under the control of Vichy France until the British and Free French occupied the country in the Syria-Lebanon campaign in July 1941. Continuing pressure from Syrian nationalists and the British forced the French to evacuate their troops in April 1946, leaving the country in the hands of a republican government that had been formed during the mandate.

=== Independent Syrian Republic ===
Upheaval dominated Syrian politics from independence through the late 1960s. In May 1948, Syrian forces invaded Palestine, together with other Arab states, and immediately attacked Jewish settlements. President Shukri al-Quwatli instructed his troops in the front, "to destroy the Zionists". The invasion purpose was to prevent the establishment of the state of Israel. Toward this end, the Syrian government engaged in an active process of recruiting former Nazis, including several former members of the Schutzstaffel, to build up their armed forces and military intelligence capabilities. Defeat in this war was one of several trigger factors for the March 1949 Syrian coup d'état by Colonel Husni al-Za'im, described as the first military overthrow of the Arab World since the start of the Second World War. This was soon followed by another overthrow, by Colonel Sami al-Hinnawi, who was quickly deposed by Colonel Adib Shishakli, all within the same year.

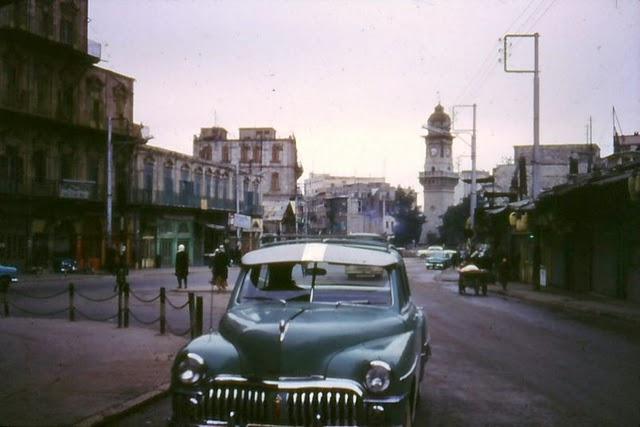
Aleppo in 1961

Shishakli would then later be overthrown in a 1954 coup, restoring the previous parliamentary system. However, by this time, power was increasingly concentrated in the military and security establishment. The weakness of parliamentary institutions and the mismanagement of the economy led to unrest and the rising influence of Nasserism and other ideologies. There was fertile ground for various Arab nationalist, Syrian nationalist, and socialist movements, which represented disaffected elements of society. Notably included were religious minorities, who demanded radical reform.

In November 1956, as a direct result of the Suez Crisis, Syria signed a pact with the Soviet Union. This gave a foothold for communist influence within the government in exchange for military equipment. Turkey then became worried about this increase in the strength of Syrian military technology, as it seemed feasible that Syria might attempt to retake İskenderun. Only heated debates in the United Nations lessened the threat of war.

=== United Arab Republic ===
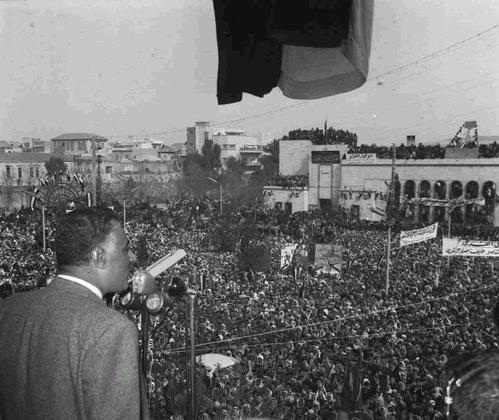
Gamal Abdel Nasser at Aleppo, 1960

On 1 February 1958, Syrian President Shukri al-Quwatli and Egypt's President Gamal Abdel Nasser announced the merging of Egypt and Syria, creating the United Arab Republic, and all Syrian political parties, as well as the communists therein, ceased overt activities. Meanwhile, a group of Syrian Ba'athist officers, alarmed by the party's poor position and the increasing fragility of the union, decided to form a secret Military Committee; its initial members were Lieutenant-Colonel Muhammad Umran, Major Salah Jadid and Captain Hafez al-Assad. Syria seceded from the union with Egypt on 28 September 1961, after a coup and terminated the political union.

==== Land reform ====
Agrarian reform measures were introduced which consisted of three interrelated programs: legislation regulating the relationship between agriculture laborers and landowners; legislation governing the ownership and use of private and state domain land and directing the economic organization of peasants; and measures reorganizing agricultural production under state control. Despite high levels of inequality in land ownership these reforms allowed for more progress in redistribution of land from 1958 to 1961 than any other reforms in Syria's history, since independence.

The first law passed (Law 134; passed 4 September 1958) was in response to concern about peasant mobilization and expanding peasants' rights. This was designed to strengthen the position of sharecroppers and agricultural laborers in relation to land owners. This law led to the creation of the Ministry of Labor and Social Affairs, which announced the implementation of new laws that would allow the regulation of working condition especially for women and adolescents, set hours of work, and introduce the principle of minimum wage for paid laborers and an equitable division of harvest for sharecroppers. Furthermore, it obligated landlords to honor both written and oral contracts, established collective bargaining, contained provisions for workers' compensation, health, housing, and employment services. Law 134 was not designed strictly to protect workers. It also acknowledged the rights of landlords to form their own syndicates.

=== Ba'athist Syria ===
The instability which followed the 1961 coup culminated in the 8 March 1963 Ba'athist coup. The takeover was engineered by members of the Arab Socialist Ba'ath Party, led by Michel Aflaq and Salah al-Din al-Bitar. The new Syrian cabinet was dominated by Ba'ath members. From the 1963 seizure of power by its Military Committee to the fall of the regime in 2024, the Ba'ath party ruled Syria as a dictatorship which was frequently described as totalitarian, (Note: Sources describing Syria as a totalitarian state: Auerbach, Jonathan; Castronovo, Russ, eds. (13 December 2013). The Oxford Handbook of Propaganda Studies. Oxford University Press. p. 422. doi:10.1093/oxfordhb/9780199764419.001.0001. ISBN 978-0-19-976441-9.; Wieland, Carsten (2018). "6: De-neutralizing Aid: All Roads Lead to Damascus". Syria and the Neutrality Trap: The Dilemmas of Delivering Humanitarian Aid Through Violent Regimes. London: I. B. Tauris. p. 68. ISBN 978-0-7556-4138-3.; Meininghaus, Esther (2016). "Introduction". Creating Consent in Ba'thist Syria: Women and Welfare in a Totalitarian State. I. B. Tauris. pp. 1–33. ISBN 978-1-78453-115-7.; Sadiki, Larbi; Fares, Obaida (2014). "12: The Arab Spring Comes to Syria: Internal Mobilization for Democratic Change, Militarization and Internationalization". Routledge Handbook of the Arab Spring: Rethinking Democratization. Routledge. p. 147. ISBN 978-0-415-52391-2.) although some scholars rejected this description. Ba'athists took control over country's politics, education, culture, religion and surveilled all aspects of civil society through its powerful Mukhabarat (secret police). The Syrian Arab Armed Forces and secret police were integrated with the Ba'ath party apparatus; after the purging of traditional civilian and military elites by the regime.

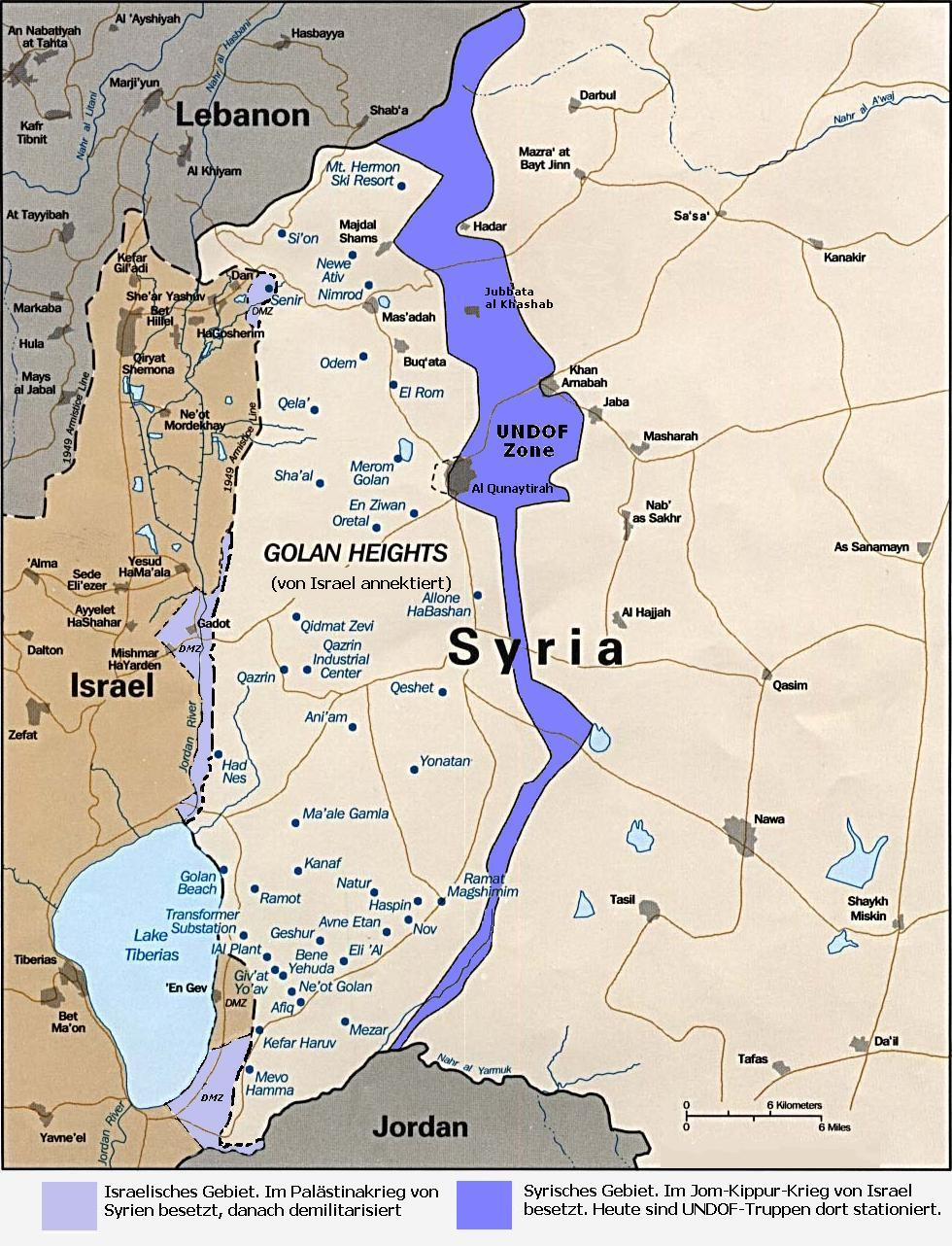
The Syrian Golan Heights have been occupied by Israel since 1967

The 1963 Ba'athist coup marked a "radical break" in modern Syrian history, after which Ba'ath party monopolised power in the country to establish a one-party state and shaped a socio-political order by enforcing its state ideology. On 23 February 1966, the neo-Ba'athist Military Committee carried out an intra-party rebellion against the Ba'athist Old Guard (Aflaq and Bitar), imprisoned President Amin al-Hafiz and designated a regionalist, civilian Ba'ath government on 1 March. Although Nureddin al-Atassi became the formal head of state, Salah Jadid was Syria's effective ruler from 1966 until November 1970, when he was deposed by Hafez al-Assad, who at the time was Minister of Defense.

The coup led to the schism within the original pan-Arab Ba'ath Party: one Iraqi-led ba'ath movement (ruled Iraq from 1968 to 2003) and one Syrian-led ba'ath movement was established. In the first half of 1967, a low-key state of war existed between Syria and Israel. Conflict over Israeli cultivation of land in the demilitarized zone led to 7 April pre-war aerial clashes between Israel and Syria. When the Six-Day War broke out between Egypt and Israel, Syria joined the war and attacked Israel as well. In the final days of the war, Israel turned its attention to Syria, capturing two-thirds of the Golan Heights in under 48 hours. The defeat caused a split between Jadid and Assad over what steps to take next. Disagreement developed between Jadid, who controlled the party apparatus, and Assad, who controlled the military. The 1970 retreat of Syrian forces sent to aid the Palestine Liberation Organization led by Yasser Arafat during the "Black September (also known as the Jordan Civil War of 1970)" hostilities with Jordan reflected this disagreement.

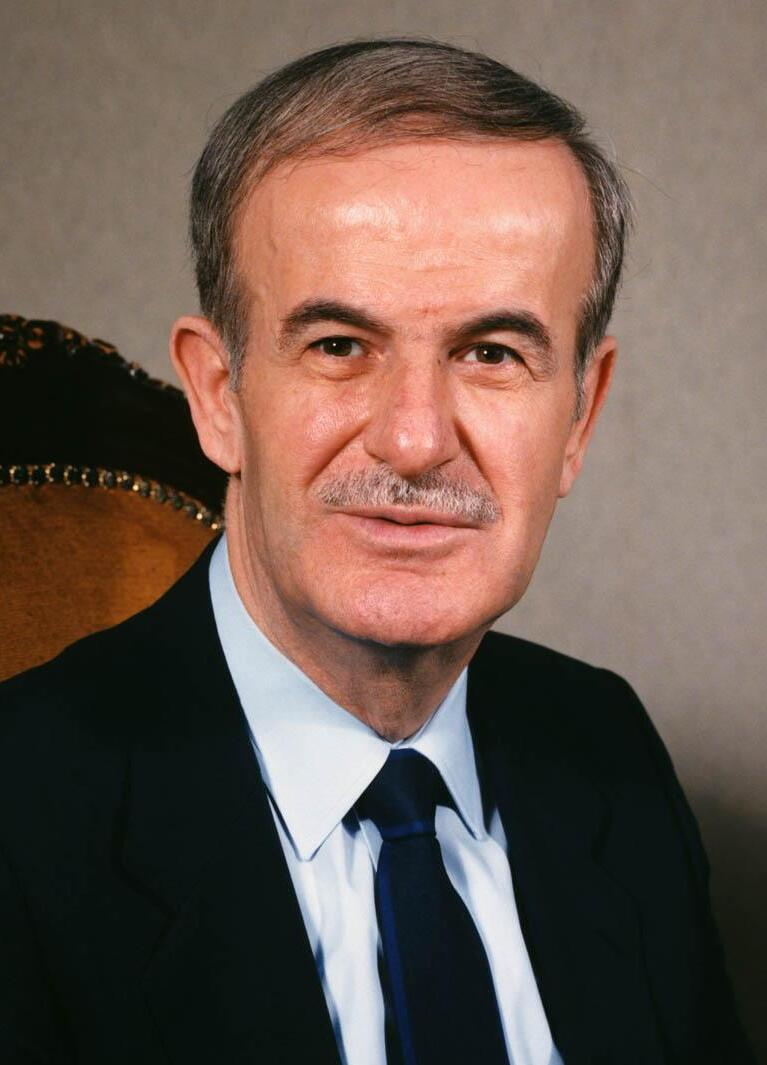
Hafez al-Assad, president of Syria from 1971 until his death in 2000

The power struggle culminated in the November 1970 Syrian Corrective movement, a bloodless military coup that installed Hafez al-Assad as the strongman of the government. Assad transformed a Ba'athist party state into a dictatorship marked by his pervasive grip on the party, armed forces, secret police, media, education sector, religious and cultural spheres and all aspects of civil society. He assigned Alawite loyalists to key posts in the military forces, bureaucracy, intelligence and the ruling elite. A cult of personality revolving around Hafez and his family became a core tenet of Ba'athist ideology, which espoused that Assad dynasty was destined to rule perennially.

On 6 October 1973, Syria and Egypt initiated the Yom Kippur War against Israel. The Israel Defense Forces reversed the initial Syrian gains and pushed deeper into Syrian territory. The village of Quneitra was largely destroyed by the Israeli army.

In the late 1970s, an Islamist uprising by the Muslim Brotherhood was aimed against the government. Islamists attacked civilians and off-duty military personnel, leading security forces to also kill civilians in retaliatory strikes. The uprising had reached its climax in the 1982 Hama massacre, when more than 2,000 to 25,000-40,000 people, including civilians, were killed by Ba'athist Syrian troops and allied paramilitaries. It has been described as the "single deadliest act" of violence perpetrated by any state upon its own population in modern Arab history.

In a major shift in relations with both other Arab states and the Western world, Syria participated in the United States-led Gulf War against Saddam Hussein. The country participated in the multilateral Madrid Conference of 1991, and during the 1990s engaged in negotiations with Israel along with Palestine and Jordan. These negotiations failed, and there have been no further direct Syrian-Israeli talks since Assad's meeting with U.S. President Bill Clinton in Geneva in 2000.

==== Involvement of Lebanese war ====
Hafez al-Assad died on 10 June 2000. His son, Bashar al-Assad, was elected president in an election in which he ran unopposed. His election saw the birth of the Damascus Spring and hopes of reform, but by autumn 2001, his government had suppressed the movement, imprisoning some of its leading intellectuals. Instead, reforms were limited to some market reforms.

On 5 October 2003 Israel bombed a site near Damascus, claiming it was a terrorist training facility for members of Islamic Jihad. In March 2004, Syrian Kurds and Arabs clashed in al-Qamishli. Signs of rioting were seen in Qamishli and Hasakeh. In 2005, Syria ended its military presence in Lebanon. The assassination of Rafic Hariri in 2005 led to international condemnation and triggered protests in Lebanon, which forced the Assad regime to end its 29-year-old military occupation in Lebanon. On 6 September 2007, foreign jet fighters, suspected as Israeli, reportedly carried out Operation Orchard against a suspected nuclear reactor under construction by North Korean technicians.

==== Syrian revolution and civil war ====
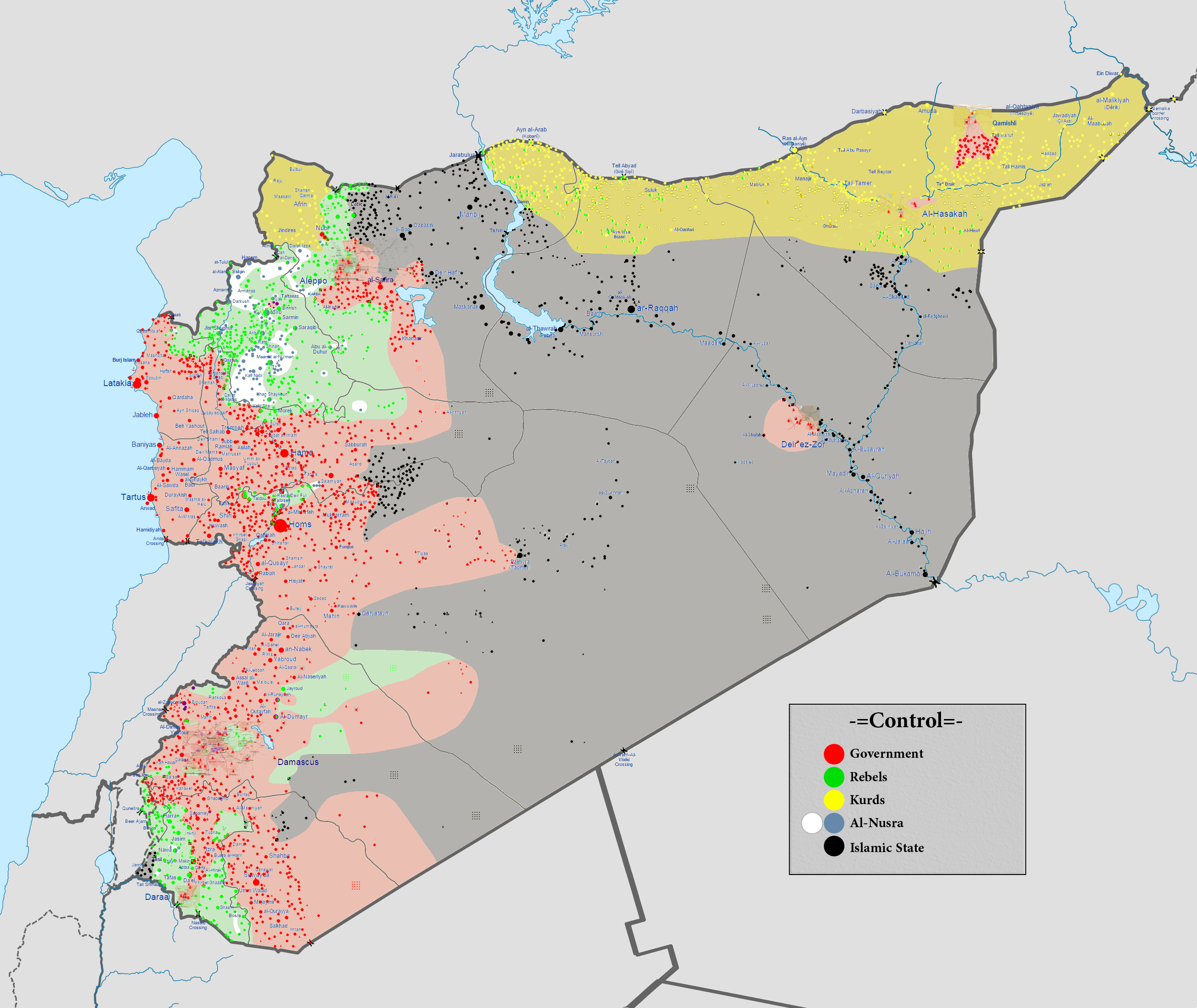
Military situation in December 2015. Islamic State-controlled territory is in grey.

Nepotism of ruling elites and authoritarian regime caused Syrian revolution as part of the wider Arab Spring. Public demonstrations across Syria began on 26 January 2011 and developed into a nationwide uprising. Protesters demanded the resignation of Assad, the overthrow of his government, and an end to nearly five decades of Ba'ath Party rule. Beginning in spring 2011, the Syrian government deployed the Syrian Army to quell the uprising, and several cities were besieged, though the unrest continued. According to some witnesses, soldiers, who refused to open fire on civilians, were summarily executed by the Syrian Army. The Syrian government denied reports of defections, and blamed armed gangs for causing trouble. In early autumn 2011, civilians and army defectors began forming fighting units, which began an insurgency campaign against the Syrian Army. The insurgents unified under the banner of the Free Syrian Army and fought in an increasingly organized fashion; however, the civilian component of the armed opposition lacked an organized leadership.

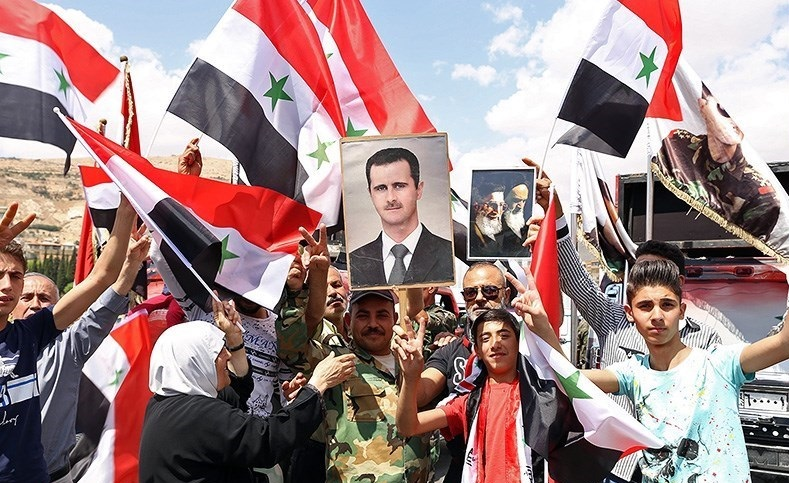
Pro-Assad demonstration in the capital Damascus after US-led missile strikes in April 2018

The Arab League, the United States, the European Union states, the Gulf Cooperation Council states, and other countries have condemned the use of violence against the protesters. China and Russia have avoided condemning the government or applying sanctions, saying that such methods could escalate into foreign intervention. However, military intervention has been ruled out by most countries. The Arab League suspended Syria's membership over the government's response to the crisis, but sent an observer mission in December 2011, as part of its proposal for peaceful resolution of the crisis.

By 2024, the Syrian civil war had resulted in more than 600,000 deaths, with pro-Assad forces causing more than 90% of the total civilian casualties. (Note: Sources:) Between March 2011 and March 2021, more than 306,000 civilians were killed in the civil war. The war led to a massive refugee crisis, with an estimated 7.6 million internally displaced people (July 2015 UNHCR figure) and over 5 million refugees (July 2017 registered by UNHCR). The war has also worsened economic conditions, with more than 90% of the population living in poverty and 80% facing food insecurity. (Note: Sources: "Islamic bloc suspends Syria membership over crisis". DW News. 16 August 2012. Archived from the original on 27 June 2018.; "Organisation of Islamic Cooperation suspends Syria". Ahram Online. 16 August 2012. Archived from the original on 1 July 2018.; "OIC Suspends Syria Over Crackdown". RFE/RL. 16 August 2012. Archived from the original on 8 February 2023.)

==== Rise and fall of Islamic State and factional escalation ====
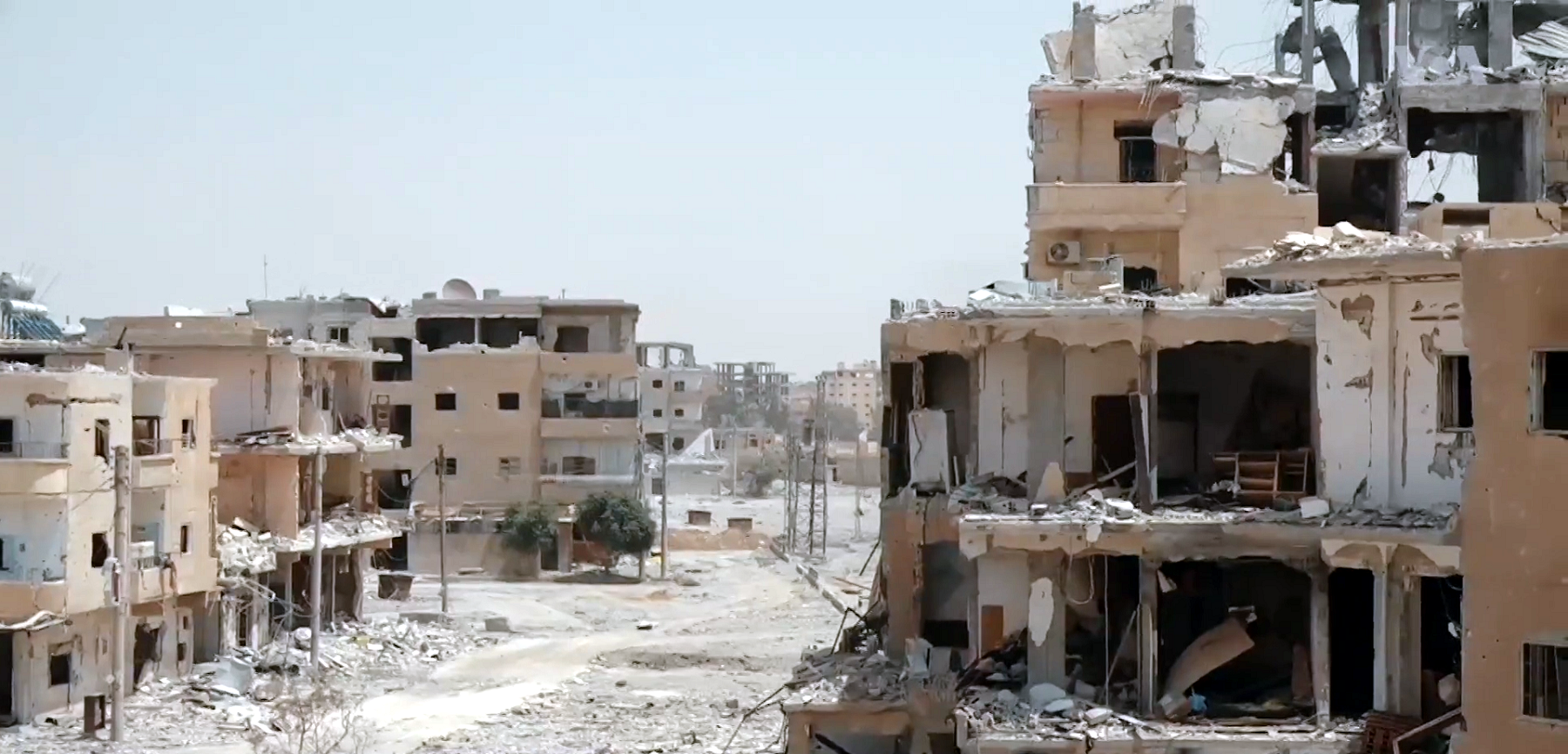
IS's capital Raqqa suffered extensive damage during the battle of Raqqa in June–October 2017

Taking advantage of the Syrian civil war, the Islamic State of Iraq and Syria (ISIS) won many battles against the rebel factions and the Ba'athist-led Syrian government in 2014. ISIS was able to seize control of large parts of Eastern Syria, prompting a United States-led coalition to launch an aerial bombing campaign against ISIS, while providing ground support and supplies to the Syrian Democratic Forces (SDF), a Kurdish-dominated coalition led by the People's Defense Units (YPG).

In August 2016, Turkey launched a multi-pronged invasion of northern Syria, in response to the creation of the Kurdish-led Autonomous Administration of North and East Syria, also known as Rojava, while also fighting ISIS and government forces in the process. During this time, Turkey helped establish the Syrian National Army (SNA) out of remnants of the Free Syrian Army. Iran and later Russia also intervened in the civil war on behalf of the Assad government to help defeat ISIS and attack both SDF and SNA. The ISIS eventually lost its territory after the fall of IS in Mosul and increasingly resorted to more terror bombings and insurgency operations that continues in present.

==== Rebel offensive and fall of the Ba'athist regime ====
Military situation before the opposition offensives in late 2024. Territories controlled by the SDF and the United States (yellow), IS (grey), the Syrian Arab Armed Forces, Russia and Iran (red), SNA and Turkey (light green), Hay'at Tahrir al-Sham (white), SFA and the United States (teal), Israeli-occupied Golan Heights (not shown as part of Syria) .

In December 2024, violence flared up once again. Rebel factions, led by the Islamist group Hay'at Tahrir al-Sham (HTS), took control of Aleppo in a lightning offensive, prompting a retaliatory airstrike campaign by Syrian regime forces, supported by Russian aviation assets. The strikes, which targeted population centers and several hospitals in rebel-held city of Idlib, resulted in at least 25 deaths according to the White Helmets rescue group. NATO issued a joint statement calling for the protection of civilians and critical infrastructure to prevent further displacement and ensure humanitarian access. They stressed the urgent need for a Syrian-led political solution, in accordance with UN Security Council Resolution 2254, which advocates for dialogue between the Syrian government and opposition forces.

The rebel offensive, which had begun on 27 November, continued its advance into Hama province following their capture of Aleppo. On 30 November, Brigadier General Hossam Louka, director of the General Security Directorate, attempted to stage a coup in Damascus while Bashar al-Assad was in Moscow, but would be foiled by Bashar's younger brother Maher. On 4 December, fierce clashes erupted in Hama province as the Syrian army engaged rebel forces in a bid to halt their advance on the key city of Hama. Government forces claimed to have launched a counteroffensive with air support, pushing back rebel factions, including HTS, around six miles from the city. However, despite reinforcements, the rebels captured the city on 5 December. The fighting led to widespread displacement, with nearly 50,000 people fleeing the area and over 600 casualties reported, including 104 civilians.

Military situation after the fall of the Assad regime in December 2024. Territories controlled by the Hay'at Tahrir al-Sham (white) and SOR (pink), Turkey and SNA (light green), the United States and SDF (yellow), IS (grey), the Syrian uncertain/mixed (red/light grey), the United States and SFA (teal), Israeli occupation (blue).

Rebel forces reached the outskirts of Homs on 5 December, beginning a three-day battle for the city. Simultaneously, an HTS-coordinated mass uprising led by a coalition of Druze tribes and opposition forces captured the southern cities of Sweida and Daraa by 6 December, and rapidly advanced northwards to encircle Damascus over the following day. Homs was captured by rebel forces by the early morning of 8 December, leaving no major regime strongholds between the rebel advance and Damascus itself.

Cut off from the Alawite heartland of Tartus and Latakia governorates, faced with a rebel pincer from both north and south bearing down on Damascus, and with no hope of foreign intervention from the regime's Russian and Iranian benefactors, Assadist authority over remaining regime-held territories rapidly disintegrated. The Syrian Arab Armed Forces melted away as its soldiers abandoned their weapons and uniforms, many deserting across the border to Iraq and Lebanon. Opposition forces captured the capital Damascus on 8 December, toppling Bashar al-Assad's government and ending the Assad family's 53-year-long rule over the country. Assad fled to Moscow with his family, where he was granted asylum.

=== Transitional period ===
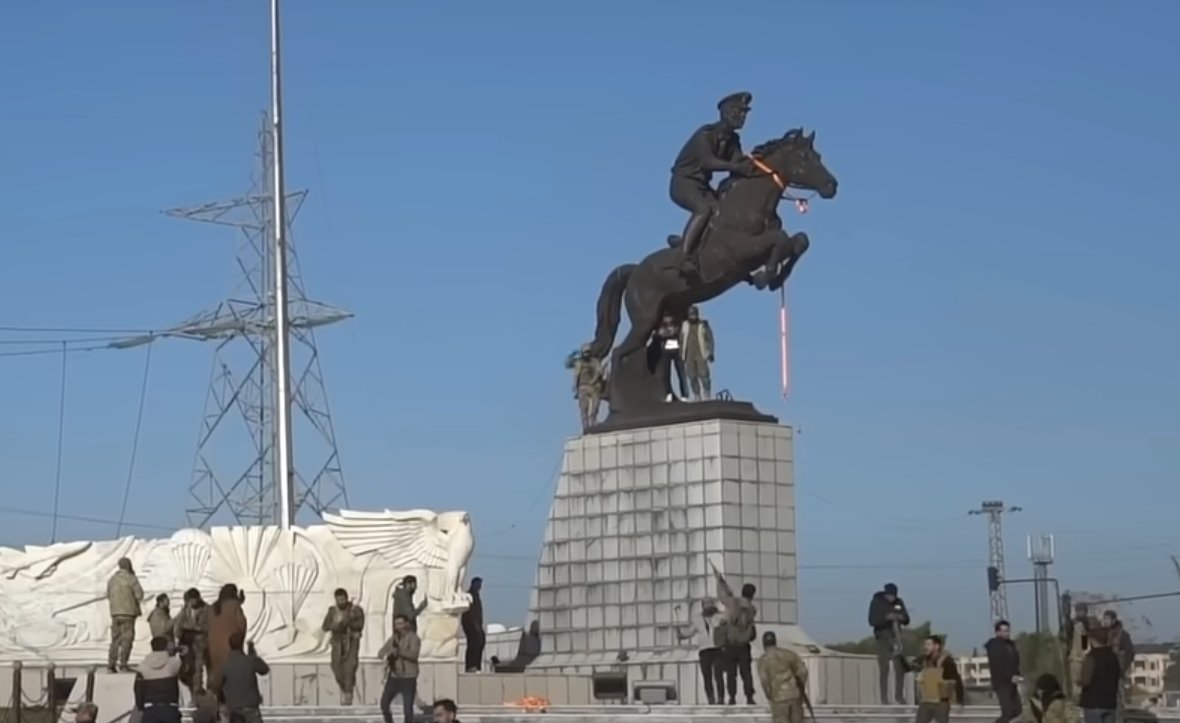
Syrian revolutionaries toppling a statue of Bassel al-Assad in New Aleppo, 30 November 2024

Following the fall of the Assad regime, Assad's ninth prime minister Mohammad Ghazi al-Jalali, with support from the opposition and Ahmed al-Sharaa, remained at his post in a caretaker capacity until a caretaker government led by Mohammed al-Bashir was formed the following day. Al-Jalali called for fresh elections so that the Syrian people may choose their new leaders.

Prior to the fall of the Assad regime, Mohammed al-Bashir headed the Syrian Salvation Government (SSG) formed in the province of Idlib by Hay'at Tahrir al-Sham (HTS), the Islamist militant organization which led the overthrow of Assad in December 2024. In general, the formation of the Transitional Government was scaling of the SSG "to the whole of Syria", as the composition of the new government was almost the same as that of the SSG. According to a report by the Syrian Network for Human Rights, critics and opponents of the HTS were subject to repression in forms of enforced disappearances and tortures. Shortly after the fall of the Assad regime, Israel commenced a ground invasion of the Purple Line buffer zone near the Golan Heights, as well as commencing a series of airstrikes against Syrian military depots and naval bases. The Israeli Defense Forces claims that it is destroying Ba'athist military infrastructure, including chemical weapons plants, so that the rebels cannot use them.

Despite the collapse of the Assad regime, Turkish-backed Syrian National Army fighters in northern Syria continued their offensive against U.S.-backed Syrian Democratic Forces (SDF) forces until a ceasefire was reached on 11 December. In February 2025, the SDF, the Autonomous Administration, and the Syrian Democratic Council decided in a meeting that SDF would merge with the Syrian Armed Forces. The International Coalition against ISIS voiced support for continued dialogue between the SDF and the new Syrian government as well.

The prime minister of the transitional government, Mohammed al-Bashir, promised that Christians and other minorities would be permitted to continue practicing their religion without interference. However, this assurance was met with doubts, as many rebel forces had previous connections to al-Qaeda and the Islamic State. The use of a variation of the Tawhid flag by the new government alongside the opposition flag also raised worries, as it implied the new state may be less secular. Aisha al-Dibs was appointed as the Minister of Women's Affairs on 22 December 2024. On 12 December 2024, a spokesman of the transitional government speaking to Agence France-Presse said that during the government's three-month term, the constitution and parliament would be suspended and that a 'judicial and human rights committee' would be established to review the constitution, prior to making amendments.

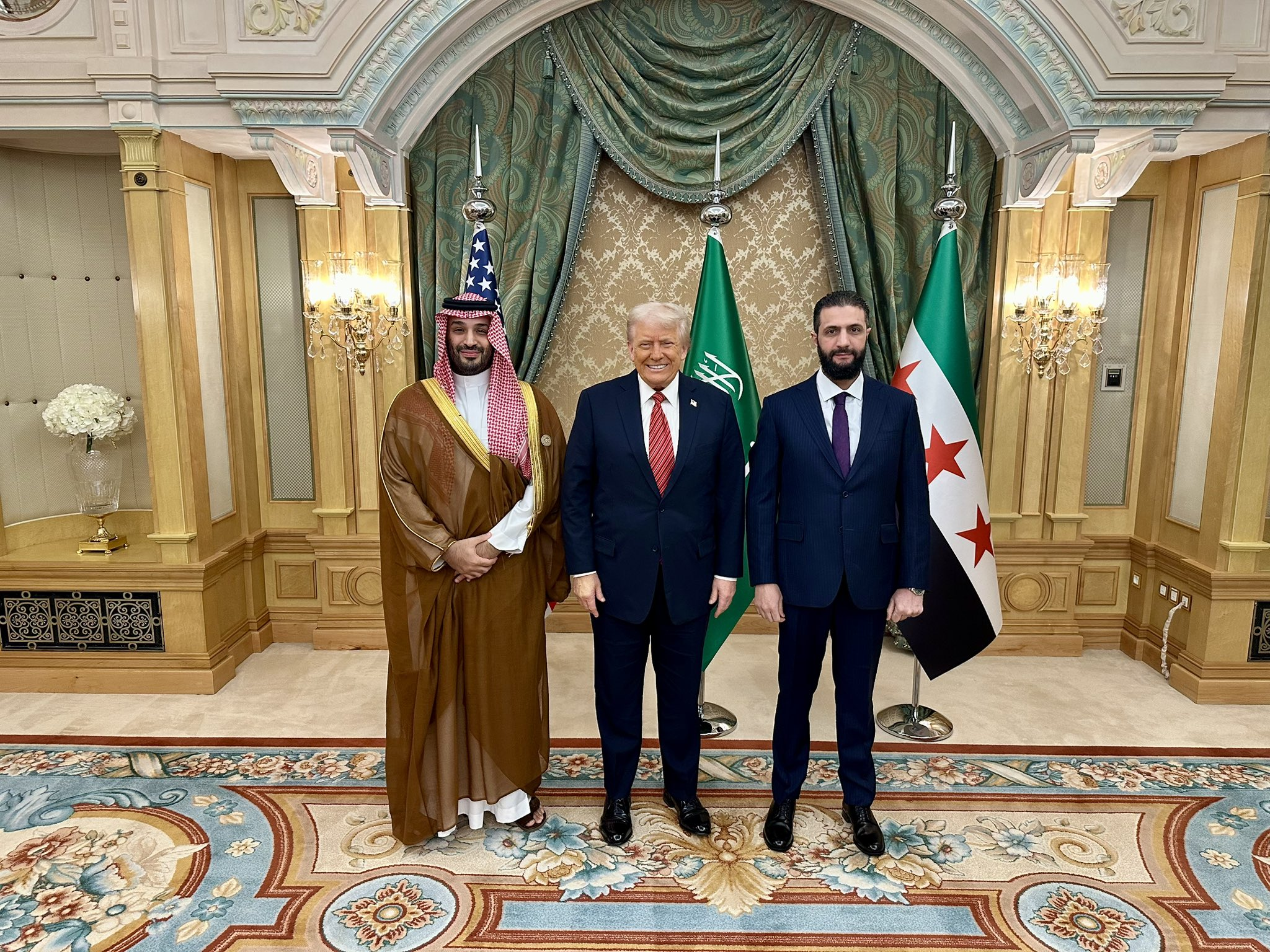
Syrian President Ahmed al-Sharaa with U.S. President Donald Trump and Saudi Crown Prince Mohammed bin Salman in Riyadh, Saudi Arabia, 14 May 2025

On 29 January 2025, during the Syrian Revolution Victory Conference in Presidential Palace, the Syrian General Command appointed Ahmed al-Sharaa as president for the transitional period after he had served as the de facto leader following the fall of the Assad regime.

In March 2025, the UK-based SOHR reported that Syrian security forces and pro-government fighters had committed a massacre of more than 1500 Alawite civilians during clashes in western Syria.

On 10 March 2025, the SDF agreed to merge with the Syrian Armed Forces after SDF leader Mazloum Abdi met with al-Sharaa. Three days later, al-Sharaa signed an interim constitution covering a five-year transitional period.

On 29 March 2025, the Syrian transitional government was announced by Syrian president Ahmed al-Sharaa at a ceremony at the Presidential Palace in Damascus, in which the new ministers were sworn in and delivered speeches outlining their agendas. The government replaced the Syrian caretaker government, which was formed following the fall of the Assad regime on 8 December 2024. Since then, a number of Western governments have lifted the sanctions on Syria, most notably the United States and the United Kingdom.

The 2025 hunger crisis in Syria, considered the country's most severe modern humanitarian emergency, pushed over 14 million people into food insecurity, including 9.1 million facing acute hunger. Driven by a 36-year record drought, economic collapse, and post-Assad instability, the crisis left over half the population in need of aid. Between 6 and 11 January 2026, fighting in Aleppo between Syrian government forces and the Kurdish-led Syrian Democratic Forces had resulted in the deaths of 23 people and displaced 148,000 residents. In October 2025, a parliamentary election was held under al-Sharaa's administration, the first since the fall of the Ba'athist regime. The People’s Assembly held its inaugural session on 12 July 2026, after being delayed from 6 July. It was the first legislative session since the fall of the Assad regime.

== Geography ==
Syria is the twenty-fifth-largest country in Asia. It borders Turkey to the north; Iraq to the east and southeast; Jordan to the south; Israel and Lebanon to the southwest; and the Mediterranean Sea to the west. Syrian territory covers 185,180 km^{2} (71,500 sq mi). Elevation ranges from the coastal plains of the Mediterranean to the mountains of western Syria, with Mount Hermon being the country's highest point at 2,814 metres (9,232 feet). Much of central and eastern Syria consists of arid plateaus and desert regions, including parts of the Syrian desert, while the fertile valleys of the Euphrates, Orontes, and Khabur rivers support agriculture and settlement. Significant natural resources include petroleum, natural gas, phosphate rock, asphalt, marble, gypsum, and arable land.

=== Climate ===
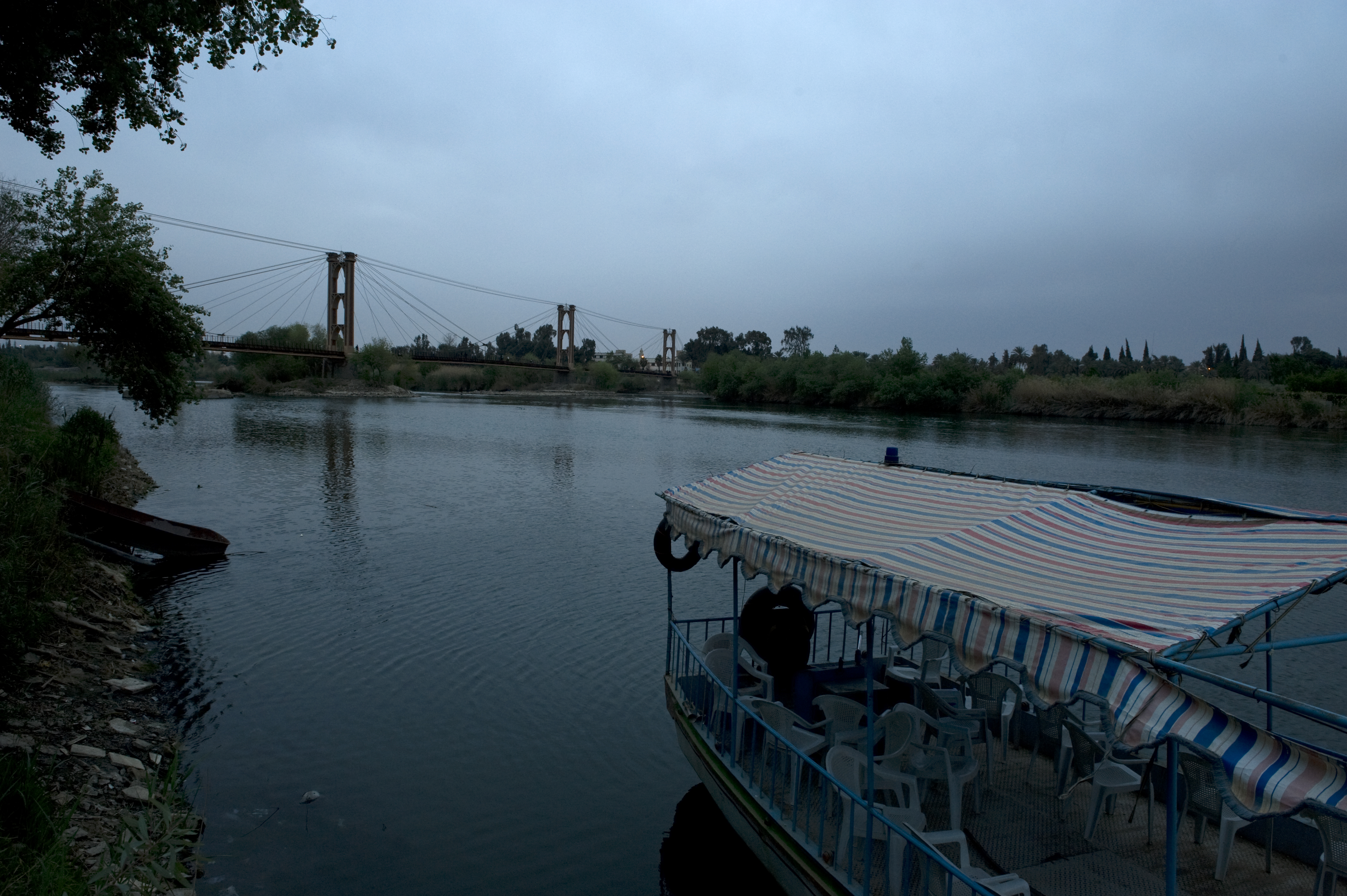
The Euphrates is the longest and one of the oldest rivers in Western Asia

Syria's climate varies from the humid Mediterranean coast, through a semi-arid steppe zone, to arid desert in the east. The country consists mostly of arid plateau, although the northwest part bordering the Mediterranean is fairly green. Al-Jazira in the northeast and Hauran in the south are important agricultural areas. The Euphrates, Syria's most important river, crosses the country in the east. Syria is one of the fifteen states that comprise the so-called "cradle of civilization". Its land straddles the northwest of the Arabian plate.

Petroleum in commercial quantities was first discovered in the northeast in 1956. The most important oil fields are those of al-Suwaydiyah, Karatchok, Rmelan near al-Hasakah, as well as al-Omar and al-Taym fields near Deir ez-Zor. The fields are a natural extension of the Iraqi fields of Mosul and Kirkuk. Petroleum became Syria's leading natural resource and chief export after 1974. Natural gas was discovered at the field of Jbessa in 1940.

=== Biodiversity ===
Syria contains four terrestrial ecoregions: Middle East steppe, Eastern Mediterranean conifer–sclerophyllous–broadleaf forests, Southern Anatolian montane conifer and deciduous forests, and Mesopotamian shrub desert. The country had a 2019 Forest Landscape Integrity Index mean score of 3.64/10, ranking it 144th globally out of 172 countries.

== Politics and government ==
=== Transitional period (2024–present) ===
==== Political system ====
Syria is currently undergoing a political transition following the fall of the Assad regime on 8 December 2024. It operates under a unitary presidential system and, as of 2026, is governed by a transitional government during a provisional period. Currently, Syria operates as a unitary state, with the president serving as both head of state and head of government, although there are proposals to implement decentralisation. Since the Syrian Revolution Victory Conference banned the Ba'athist-era National Progressive Front, no new legislation regulating political parties has been enacted, and major political parties have yet to emerge in Syria.

==== Presidency and transitional government ====
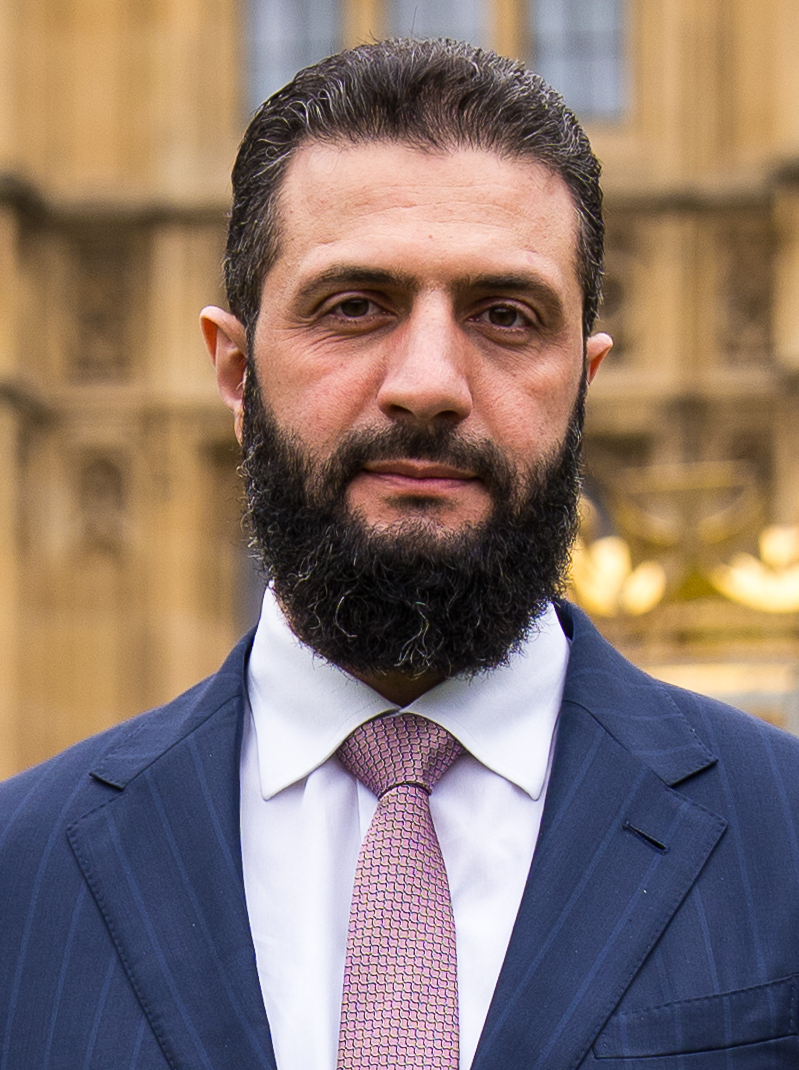
Ahmed al-Sharaa
President

Abdul Hamid al-Awak
Speaker of the People's Assembly

Issam al-Khalif
President of the Supreme Constitutional Court

After the fall of the Assad regime, the presidency became vacant on 8 December 2024, with the duties of the head of state carried out by the caretaker government, while Ahmed al-Sharaa served as the de facto leader as commander of Hayat Tahrir al-Sham and head of the new Syrian administration. Outgoing Prime Minister Mohammad Ghazi al-Jalali continued to serve in a caretaker capacity until Mohammed al-Bashir was designated prime minister by the Syrian General Command on 10 December 2024.

On 29 January 2025, during the Syrian Revolution Victory Conference in Damascus, the Syrian General Command officially appointed al-Sharaa as president of Syria for the transitional period. In his first address as president on 31 January, al-Sharaa also announced plans to issue a "constitutional declaration" to serve as a legal reference following the repeal of the Syrian Constitution of 2012. On 13 March 2025, al-Sharaa ratified the Constitutional Declaration, which established a five-year transitional period. On 29 March 2025, the caretaker government was replaced by the Syrian transitional government, which was announced by al-Sharaa during a ceremony at the People's Palace in Damascus, and during which the new ministers were sworn in and delivered speeches outlining their agendas, while the position of prime minister was abolished.

==== Constitutional framework ====
People's Assembly Building in Damascus, Syria, the seat of the Assembly.

Under the Constitutional Declaration, the powers of the three branches of government are distributed during the transitional period as follows: legislative power is vested in the People's Assembly; executive power is exercised by the government under the leadership of the president; and judicial power is vested in an independent judiciary, with judges subject only to the law.

Under the Constitutional Declaration, the President of Syria serves as the commander-in-chief of the army and armed forces, appoints ministers, dismisses them from office, and accepts their resignations. The President also appoints one or more vice presidents, determines their powers, and may dismiss them or accept their resignations. If the presidency becomes vacant, a vice president assumes the President's powers. The position of vice president has remained vacant since the fall of the Assad regime. The president appoints one-third of the members of the People's Assembly, as well as the judges of the Constitutional Court, without requiring confirmation from the People's Assembly.

According to Article 39, the President promulgates laws approved by the People’s Assembly and has the right to object to them through a reasoned decision within one month of receiving them from the Assembly. A law subject to a presidential objection shall not be promulgated unless it is approved again by a two-thirds majority of the People’s Assembly, in which case the President must promulgate it by decree. Under Article 36, the President issues executive and regulatory regulations, control regulations, presidential orders, and decisions in accordance with the law.

Under Article 41, the President declares general mobilization and war with the approval of the National Security Council.

=== Ba'athist Syria (1963–2024) ===
The Syrian Arab Republic was a presidential state that nominally permitted the candidacy of individuals who were not part of the Ba'ath-controlled National Progressive Front. Despite this, Syria remained a one-party state with an extensive secret police apparatus that curtailed any independent political activity. The constitution introduced unilaterally by the Assad regime, without the participation of the Syrian opposition, had bolstered its authoritarian character by bestowing extraordinary powers on the presidency, and a Ba'athist political committee continued to be responsible for authorization of political parties.

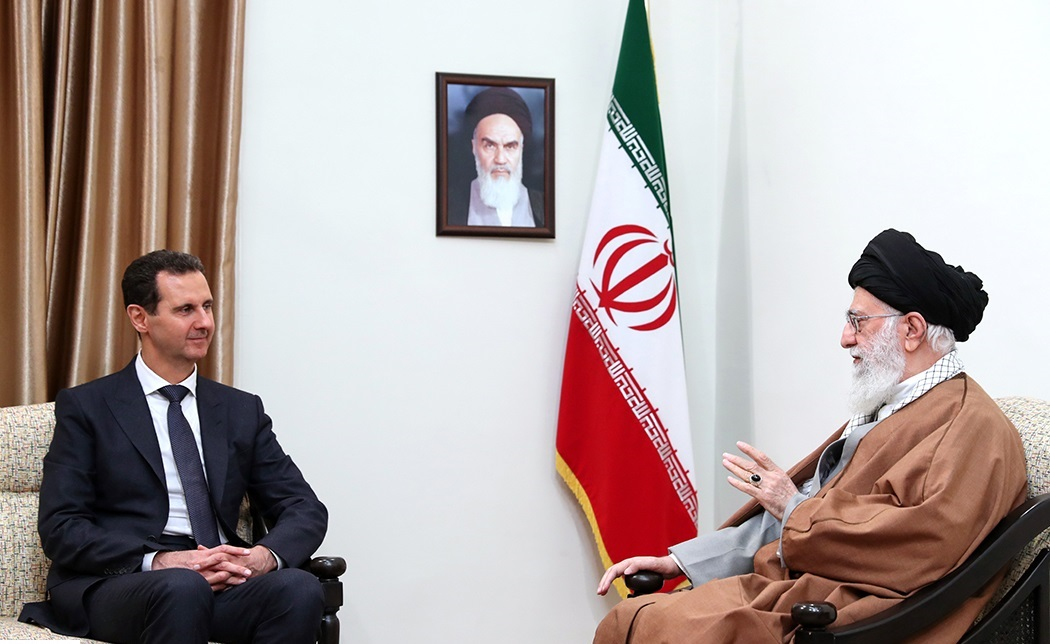
Syrian president Bashar al-Assad with Ayatollah Ali Khamenei in Tehran, Iran, 25 February 2019

The ruling Arab Socialist Ba'ath Party governed Syria as a police state through its control of the Syrian military and security apparatus; this system has frequently been described as totalitarian, although some scholars have preferred the term authoritarian. The 50th edition of Freedom in the World, published by Freedom House in 2023, designated Syria as "Worst of the Worst" among the "Not Free" countries and gave it the lowest score (1/100) alongside South Sudan.

According to the 2012 Syrian constitution, the President of Syria was the head of the Syrian state, while the Prime Minister of Syria was nominally the head of government, although real power in the system lay with the presidency. The legislature, the People's Assembly, was the body responsible for passing laws, approving government appropriations and debating policy. In the event of a vote of no confidence by a simple majority, the prime minister was required to tender the resignation of their government to the president. Since the rule of Hafez al-Assad, the Ba'athist political system was centered around a comprehensive cult of personality focused on the Assad family; with Alawite loyalists of the Ba'ath party dominating key positions in the military apparatus, secret police, and political establishment.

The executive branch consisted of the president, two vice presidents, the prime minister, and the Council of Ministers (cabinet). The constitution required the president to be a Muslim but did not make Islam the state religion. On 31 January 1973, Hafez al-Assad implemented a new constitution, which led to a national crisis. Unlike previous constitutions, this one did not require that the President of Syria be a Muslim, leading to fierce demonstrations in Hama, Homs, and Aleppo organized by the Muslim Brotherhood and the traditional ulama. They labelled Assad the "enemy of Allah" and called for a jihad against his rule. The government survived a series of armed revolts led mostly by Islamists of the Muslim Brotherhood, between 1976 and 1982, through a series of repressions and massacres. The constitution gave the president the right to appoint ministers, to declare war and state of emergency, to issue laws (which, except in the case of emergency, require ratification by the People's Council), to declare amnesty, to amend the constitution, and to appoint civil servants and military personnel. According to the 2012 constitution, the president was elected by Syrian citizens in a direct election. Syria's legislative branch was the unicameral People's Council. The People's Council primarily served as an institution to validate Syria's one-party system and re-affirm the legislative proceedings of the Arab Socialist Ba'ath party.

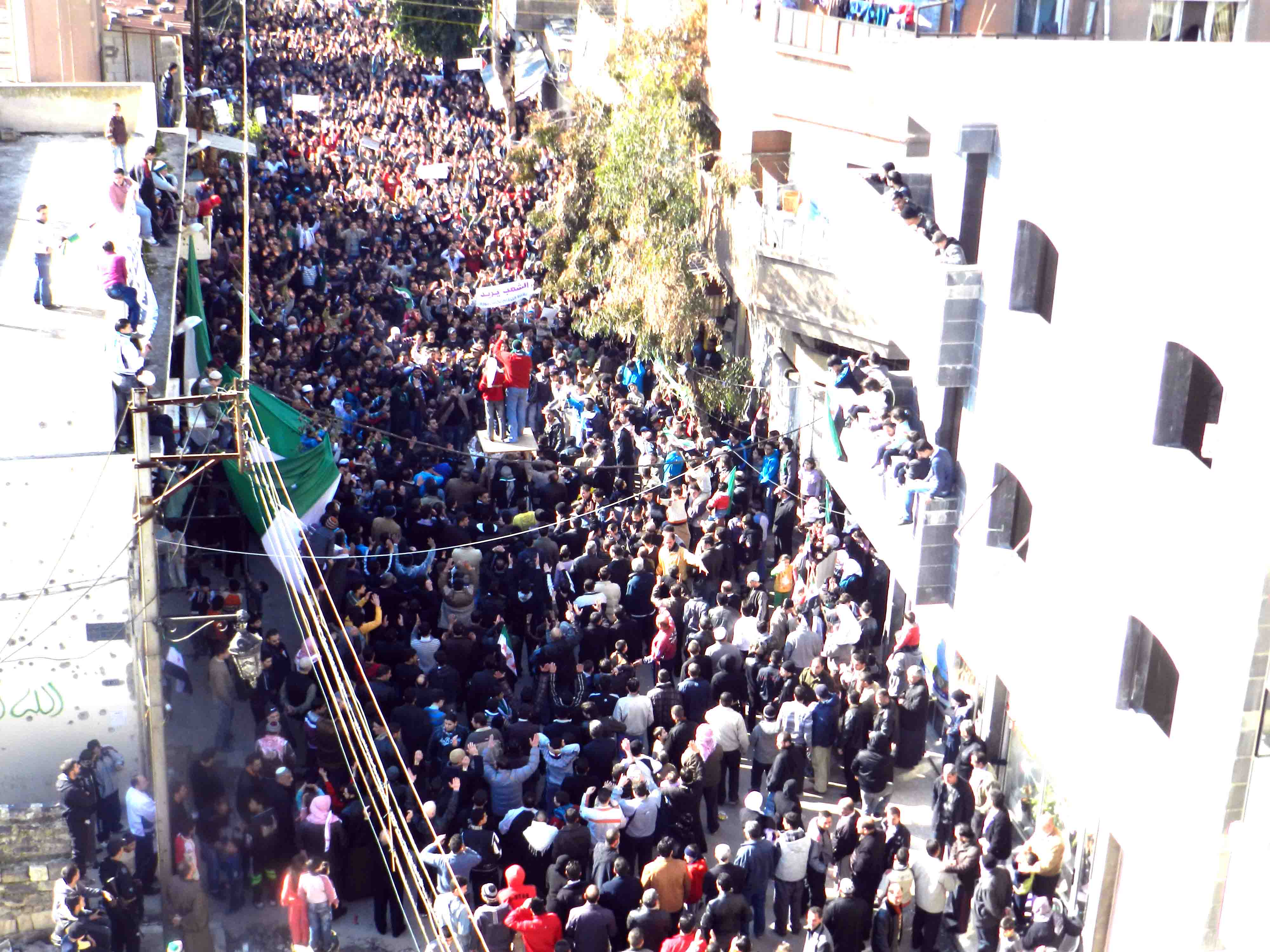
Protest against the Assad regime in the city of Homs, 3 February 2012

There was no independent judiciary in Syria, since all judges and prosecutors were required to be Ba'athist appointees. Syria's judicial branches include the Supreme Constitutional Court, the High Judicial Council, the Court of Cassation, and the State Security Courts. Islamic jurisprudence was a main source of legislation and Syria's judicial system had elements of Ottoman, French, and Islamic laws. Syria had three levels of courts: courts of first instance, courts of appeals, and the constitutional court, the highest tribunal. Religious courts handled questions of personal and family law. The Supreme State Security Court was abolished by Bashar al-Assad in 2011. As a result of the ongoing civil war, various alternative governments were formed, including the Syrian Interim Government, the Democratic Union Party and localized regions governed by sharia. Representatives of the Syrian Interim government were invited to take up Syria's seat at the Arab League in 2013 and was recognised as the "sole representative of the Syrian people" by several nations including the United States, United Kingdom, and France.

Syria's elections were conducted through a sham process, characterised by wide-scale rigging, repetitive voting and absence of voter registration and verification systems. Parliamentary elections were held on 13 April 2016 in the government-controlled areas of Syria, for all 250 seats of Syria's unicameral legislature, the Majlis al-Sha'ab, or the People's Council of Syria. Even before results had been announced, several nations, including Germany, the United States and the United Kingdom, have declared their refusal to accept the results, largely citing it "not representing the will of the Syrian people." However, representatives of the Russian Federation have voiced their support of this election's results. Various independent observers and international organizations have denounced the Assad regime's electoral conduct as a scam; with the United Nations condemning it as illegitimate elections with "no mandate". Electoral Integrity Project's 2022 Global report designated Syrian elections as a "facade" with the worst electoral integrity in the world alongside Comoros and Central African Republic.

=== Administrative divisions ===
Governorates of Syria

Syria is divided into 14 governorates, which are subdivided into 61 districts, which are further divided into sub-districts.

No.	Governorate	Capital
1	Latakia Governorate	Latakia
2	Idlib Governorate	Idlib
3	Aleppo Governorate	Aleppo
4	Raqqa Governorate	Raqqa
5	Hasakah Governorate	Hasakah
6	Tartus Governorate	Tartus
7	Hama Governorate	Hama
8	Deir ez-Zor Governorate	Deir ez-Zor
9	Homs Governorate	Homs
10	Rif Dimashq Governorate	Douma
11	Damascus Governorate	Damascus
12	Quneitra Governorate	Quneitra
13	Daraa Governorate	Daraa
14	Suwayda Governorate	Suwayda

=== Foreign relations ===
==== Ba'athist Syria ====
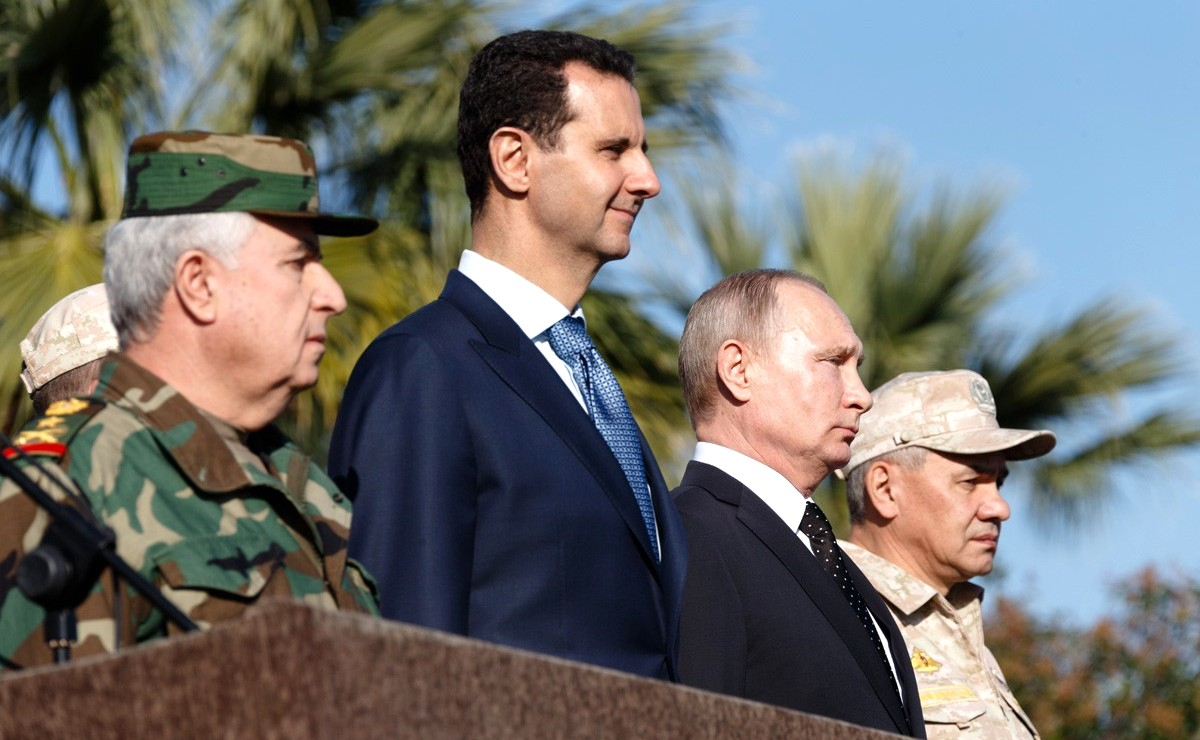
Syrian president Bashar al-Assad, Russian president Vladimir Putin, and defence minister Sergei Shoigu at Khmeimim Air Base, December 2017

Ensuring national security, increasing influence among its Arab neighbors, and securing the return of the Golan Heights, have been the primary goals of Syria's foreign policy. At many points in its history, Syria has seen virulent tension with its geographically cultural neighbors, such as Turkey, Israel, Iraq, and Lebanon. Syria enjoyed an improvement in relations with several of the states in its region in the 21st century, prior to the Arab Spring and the Syrian civil war.

Since the civil war of 2011 and associated killings and human rights abuses, Syria has been increasingly isolated from the countries in the region and the wider international community. Diplomatic relations have been severed with several countries including: Britain, Canada, France, Italy, Germany, Tunisia, Egypt, Libya, United States, Belgium, Spain, and the Arab states of the Persian Gulf.

From the Arab league, Syria continues to maintain diplomatic relations with Algeria, Egypt, Iraq, Lebanon, Sudan and Yemen. Following its violent suppression of the Arab Spring protests of the 2011 Syrian revolution, the Syrian government was suspended from the Arab League in November 2011 for over 11 years, until its reinstatement in 2023. Syria also quit the Union for the Mediterranean. After 11 years, the Arab League readmitted Syria. The Organisation of Islamic Cooperation suspended Syria in August 2012, citing "deep concern at the massacres and inhuman acts" perpetrated by forces loyal to Bashar al-Assad.

==== Post-Ba'athist Syria ====
Diplomatic relations of Syria

After the fall of the Assad regime and the subsequent formation of the Syrian transitional government, Syria has begun to re-establish diplomatic ties with nations that previously broke ties with the Ba'athist-led Syrian government during the Syrian civil war, alongside the easing and removal of economic sanctions previously placed onto the Ba'athist government, including the Caesar Act by the United States.

The Syrian transitional government had also changed its stance on returning the Golan Heights to demand the withdrawal of Israel from areas beyond the border agreed upon in the 1974 Disengagement Agreement.

The United States has also announced plans to re-open its embassy in Damascus, which was closed during the Syrian civil war on 21 February 2026, with the process approximately taking 15 days according to the United States Department of State. Prior, Tom Barrack, the United States special envoy to Syria, had risen the American flag at the ambassador's residence in May 2025.

The Syrian transitional government had also restored diplomatic ties with Turkey, with the latter now helping the former in the restructuring and training of the Syrian Armed Forces alongside assisting the Syrian military during the SDF–Syrian transitional government clashes in the form of military aid.

On 7 March 2026, following the lifting of Canadian economic sanctions on Syria, the Bank of Canada agreed to open an account in the Central Bank of Syria.

==== International disputes ====
In 1939, while Syria was still a French mandate the French allowed a plebiscite regarding the Sanjak of Alexandretta joining to Turkey as part of a treaty of friendship in World War II. In order to facilitate this, a faulty election was done in which ethnic Turks who were originally from the Sanjak but lived in Adana and other areas near the border in Turkey came to vote in the elections, shifting the election in favor of secession. Through this, the Hatay Province of Turkey was formed. The move by the French was very controversial in Syria, and only five years later Syria became independent. Despite the Turkish annexation of the Sanjak of Alexandretta, the Syrian government has refused to recognize Turkish sovereignty over the region since Independence, except for a short period in 1949.

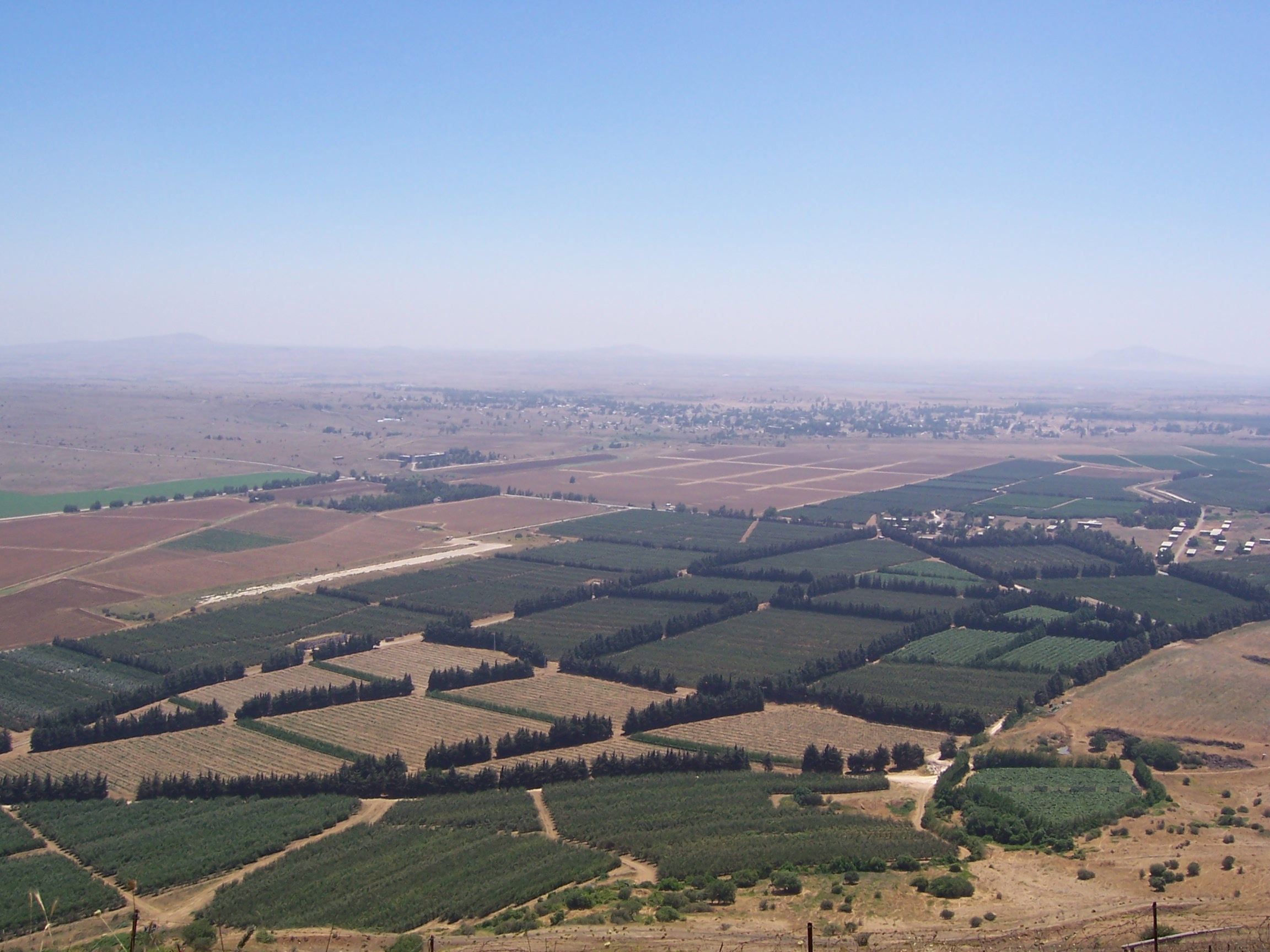
Golan Heights has been occupied by Israel since the Six-Day War.

The western two-thirds of Syria's Golan Heights region are since 1967 occupied by Israel and were in 1981 effectively annexed by Israel, whereas the eastern third is controlled by Syria, with the UNDOF maintaining a buffer zone in between, to implement the ceasefire of the Purple Line. Israel's 1981 Golan annexation law is not recognized in international law. The UN Security Council condemned it in Resolution 497 (1981) as "null and void and without international legal effect." Since then, General Assembly resolutions on "The Occupied Syrian Golan" reaffirm the illegality of Israeli occupation and annexation. The Syrian government continues to demand the return of this territory.

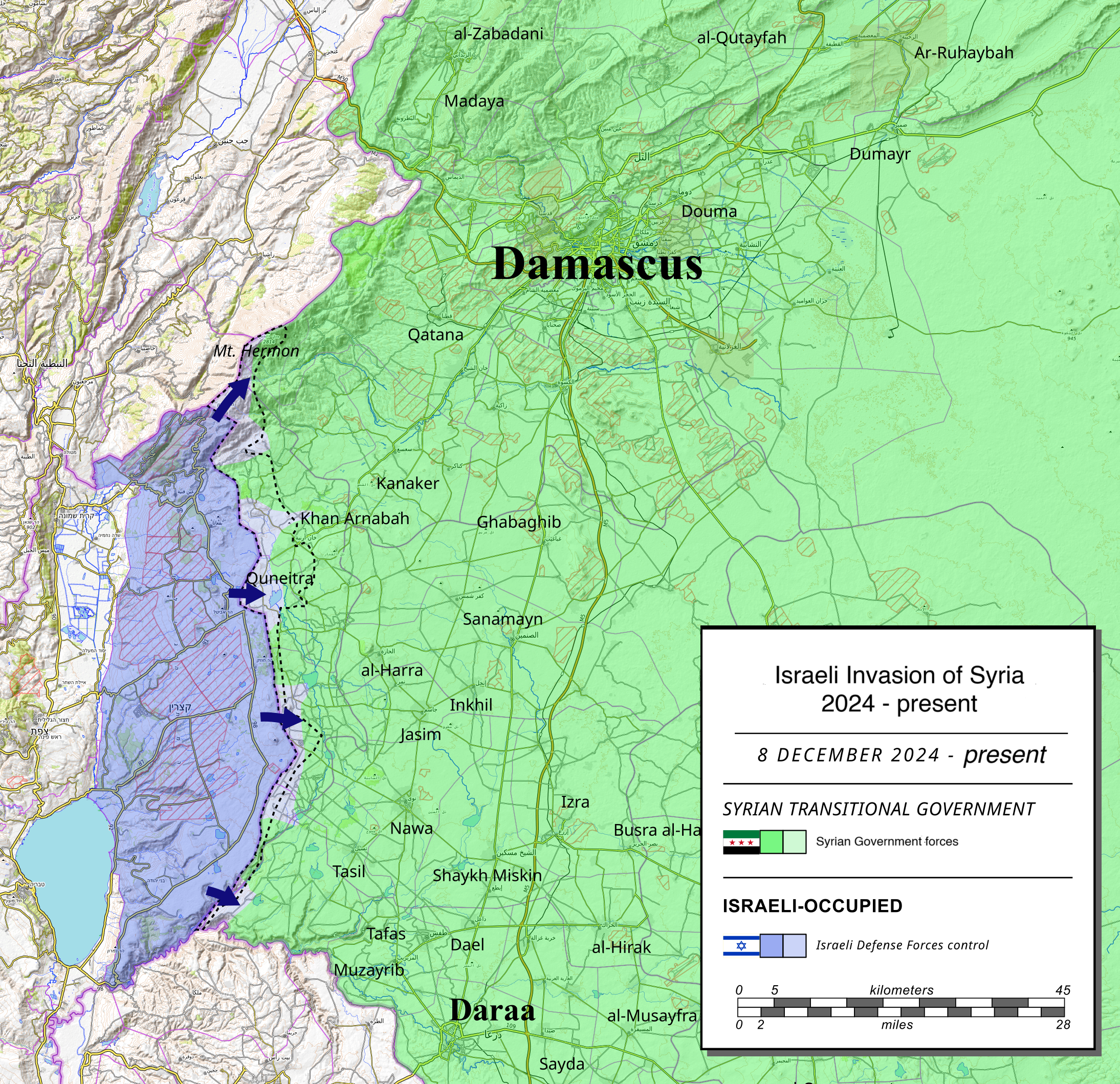
Israeli-occupied Golan Heights and Israeli invasion of Syria in December 2024.

During its invasion of Syria in December 2024, Israel took control of the U.N.-patrolled buffer zone on Syrian territory, a move that violated the 1974 disengagement agreement with Syria. On 23 February 2025, Israeli Prime Minister Benjamin Netanyahu demanded the complete demilitarization of southern Syria in the provinces of Quneitra, Daraa and Sweida, and the withdrawal of Syrian forces from Syrian territory south of Damascus. Israeli Defense Minister Israel Katz said that Israeli forces would remain in southern Syria "for an indefinite period of time to protect our communities and thwart any threat." Syria's new government under President Ahmed al-Sharaa condemned Israel's occupation of Syrian lands and demanded Israel's withdrawal.

The Turkish Armed Forces and its ally the Syrian National Army have occupied areas of northern Syria since 2016, during the Syrian civil war.

In early 1976, Syria entered Lebanon, beginning their 29-year military presence. Syria entered on the invitation of Suleiman Franjieh, the Maronite Christian president at the time to help aid the Lebanese Christian militias against the Palestinian militias. Over the following 15 years of Lebanese civil war, Syria fought for control over Lebanon. The Syrian military remained in Lebanon until 2005 in response to domestic and international pressure after the assassination of Lebanese Prime Minister Rafik Hariri.

Another disputed territory is the Shebaa farms, located in the intersection of the Lebanese-Syrian border and the Israeli-occupied Golan Heights. The farms, which are 11 km long and about 3 kilometers wide were occupied by Israel in 1981, along with rest of the Golan Heights. Yet following Syrian army advances the Israeli occupation ended and Syria became the de facto ruling power over the farms. Yet after Israeli withdrawal from Lebanon in 2000, Hezbollah claimed that the withdrawal was not complete because Shebaa was on Lebanese – not Syrian – territory. After studying 81 maps, the United Nations concluded that there is no evidence of the abandoned farmlands being Lebanese. Nevertheless, Lebanon has continued to claim ownership of the territory.

=== Military ===
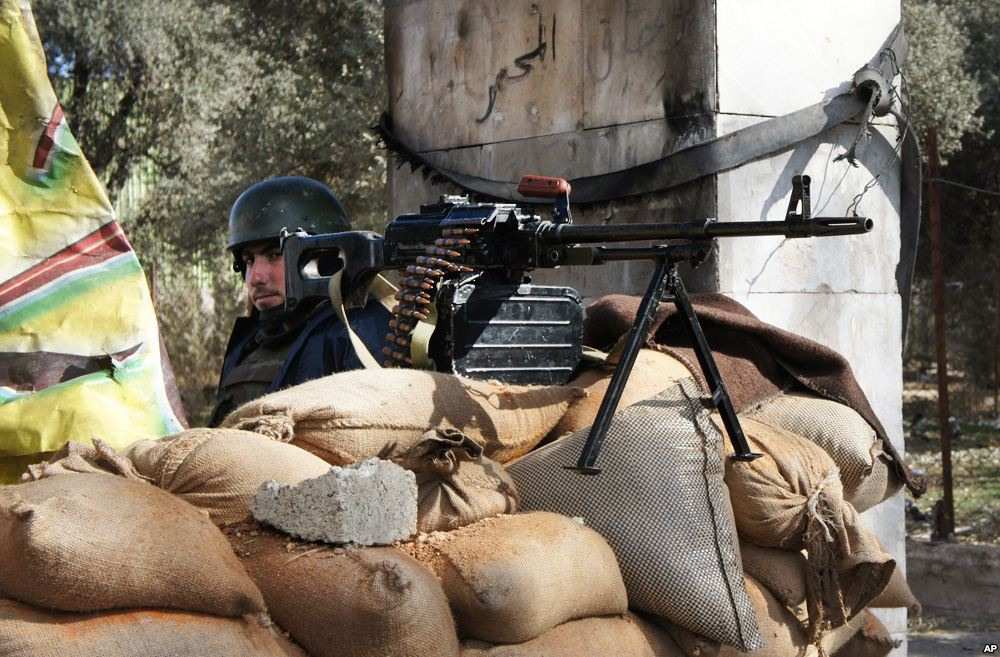
A Ba'athist Syrian Army soldier manning a checkpoint outside of Damascus shortly after the outbreak of the Syrian civil war, 2012

The President of Syria is commander in chief of the Syrian Armed Forces, comprising some 100,000 troops upon mobilization. Until 2024, the military operated as a conscripted force, with males required to serve 30 months upon reaching the age of 18, though had slowly decreased over time, from in two and a half years to two years in 2005, to 21 months in 2008 and to year and a half in 2011. Since late 2024, compulsory military service has been inactive and is no longer enforced.

The breakup of the Soviet Union—long the principal source of training, material, and credit for the Syrian forces—may have slowed Syria's ability to acquire modern military equipment. It has an arsenal of surface-to-surface missiles. In the early 1990s, Scud-C missiles with a 500-kilometre (310-mile) range were procured from North Korea, and Scud-D, with a range of up to 700 kilometres (430 miles), is allegedly being developed by Syria with the help of North Korea and Iran, according to Zisser.

Syria received significant financial aid from Arab states of the Persian Gulf as a result of its participation in the Persian Gulf War, with a sizable portion of these funds earmarked for military spending. Iran and Russia were the biggest suppliers of military aid to the Ba'athist-led regime.

=== Human rights ===
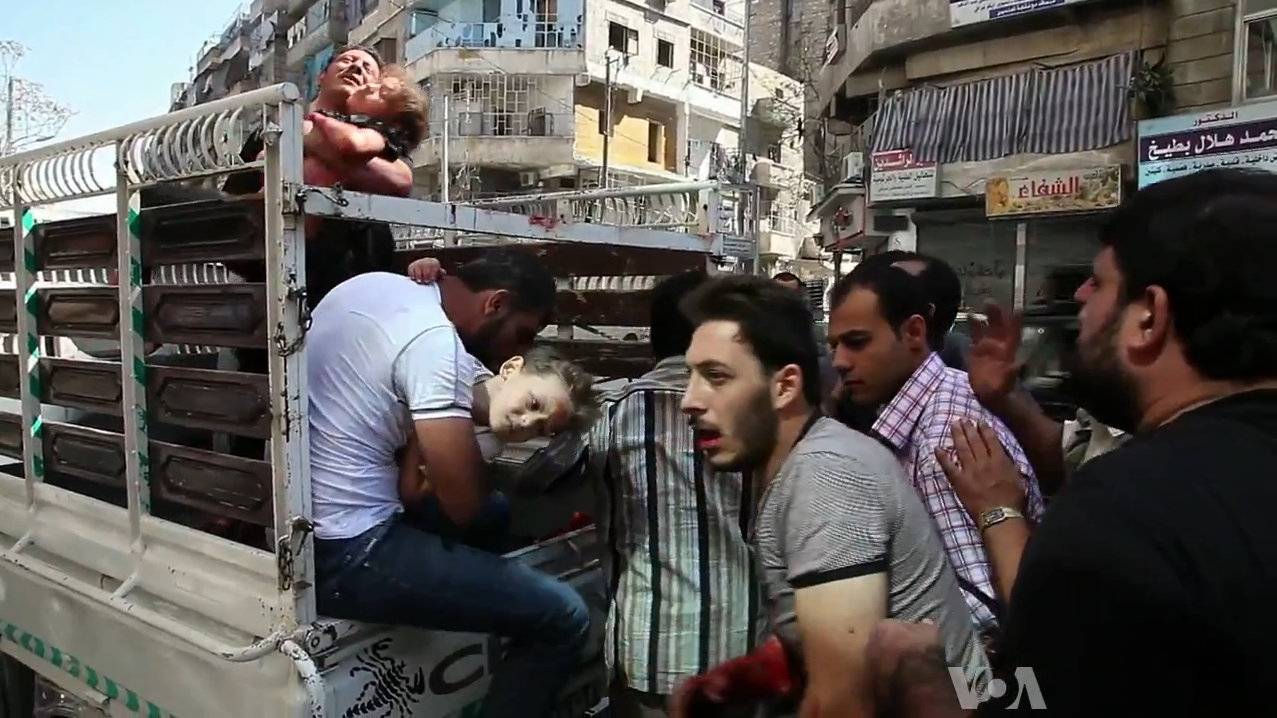
Wounded civilians arrive at a hospital in Aleppo, October 2012

Prior to the fall of the Assad regime, the situation for human rights in Syria was a significant concern among independent organizations such as Human Rights Watch, who in 2010 referred to the country's record as "among the worst in the world." The 2011 Freedom House report ranked Syria "Not Free" in its annual Freedom in the World survey. The Ba'ath regime was a totalitarian dictatorship that has been internationally condemned for its domestic and political repression, including summary executions, massive censorship, forced disappearances, etc. as well as numerous crimes against Syrian civilians perpetrated during the civil war, such as massacres, barrel-bombings, chemical attacks, etc.

The authorities are accused of arresting democracy and human rights activists, censoring websites, detaining bloggers, and imposing travel bans. Arbitrary detention, torture, and disappearances are widespread. Although Syria's constitution guarantees gender equality, critics say that personal statutes laws and the penal code discriminate against women and girls. Moreover, it also grants leniency for so-called honour killing. As of 9 November 2011 during the uprising against President Bashar al-Assad, the United Nations reported that of the over 3,500 deaths, over 250 deaths were children as young as two years old, and that boys as young as 11 years old have been gang-raped by security services officers. Syrian opposition forces claimed that more than 200, mostly civilians, were massacred and about 300 injured in Hama as a result of shelling by government forces on 12 July 2012.

In August 2013, the government was suspected of using chemical weapons against its civilians. U.S. Secretary of State John Kerry said it was "undeniable" that chemical weapons had been used in the country and that al-Assad's forces had committed a "moral obscenity" against his own people. "Make no mistake," Kerry said. "President Obama believes there must be accountability for those who would use the world's most heinous weapon against the world's most vulnerable people. Nothing today is more serious, and nothing is receiving more serious scrutiny". The Emergency Law, effectively suspending most constitutional protections, was in effect from 1963 until 21 April 2011. It was justified by the government in the light of the continuing war with Israel over the Golan Heights.

In August 2014, UN Human Rights chief Navi Pillay criticized the international community over its "paralysis" in dealing with the civil war gripping the country, which by 2014 had resulted in 191,369 deaths with war crimes, according to Pillay, being committed with total impunity on all sides in the conflict. Minority Alawites and Christians were targeted by Islamists and other groups. Three years later in April 2017, the U.S. Navy carried out a missile attack against a Syrian air base which had allegedly been used to conduct a chemical weapons attack on Syrian civilians, according to the U.S. government. In November 2021, the U.S. Central Command called a 2019 airstrike that killed civilians in Syria "legitimate". The acknowledgement came after a New York Times investigation said the military had concealed the death of dozens of non-combatants.

== Economy ==
=== Post-Ba'athist Syria ===
After the fall of the Assad regime, the subsequent formation of the Syrian transitional government and the lifting of sanctions placed onto the Ba'athist-led government, Syria's economy has begun to see significant growth, with Syrian news agency Levant24 claiming that the country's GDP had risen to $32 billion, experiencing a 30% to 35% growth in the GDP, alongside recording a budget surplus for the first time since the end of the Syrian civil war and expecting GDP to rise to $60 or $65 billion, around the same amount prior to the beginning of the civil war.

Alongside this, recent visits by president Ahmed al-Sharaa had also opened opportunities for investments in the country, as seen with his meeting with the Syrian-British Business Council during his visit to the United Kingdom, alongside other meetings during his visit to Germany, with al-Sharaa seeking to strengthen economic ties with the latter.

However, amidst the ongoing 2026 Iran war, food and other goods such as oil have also seen significant increases in their prices, exceeding 12% to 20% according to the Syrian Arab News Agency, the state-owned news agency.

=== Ba'athist Syria ===
Historical development of real GDP per capita in Syria since 1820

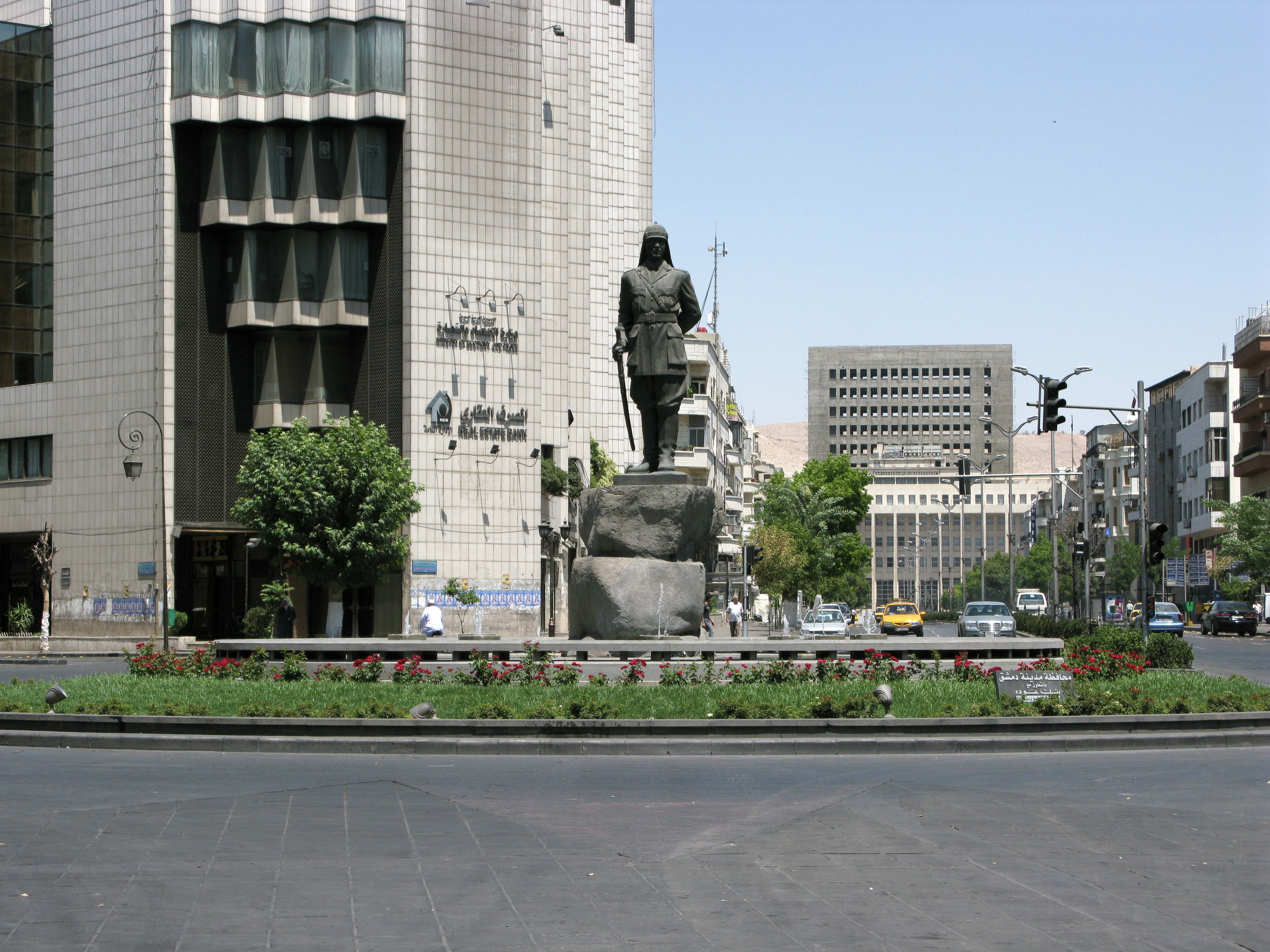
Damascus before the war, 2008

The 2011 civil war left a negative impact on Syria's economy. However, Syria's economy began declining even before the beginning of the war. Syria's share in global exports has eroded gradually since 2001. The real per capita GDP growth was just 2.5% per year in the 2000–2008 period. Poverty rates increased from 11% in 2004 to 12.3% in 2007. In 2007, main exports included crude oil, refined products, raw cotton, clothing, fruits, and grains. The bulk of imports are raw materials essential for industry, vehicles, agricultural equipment, and heavy machinery. Earnings from oil exports as well as remittances from Syrian workers are the government's most important sources of foreign exchange.

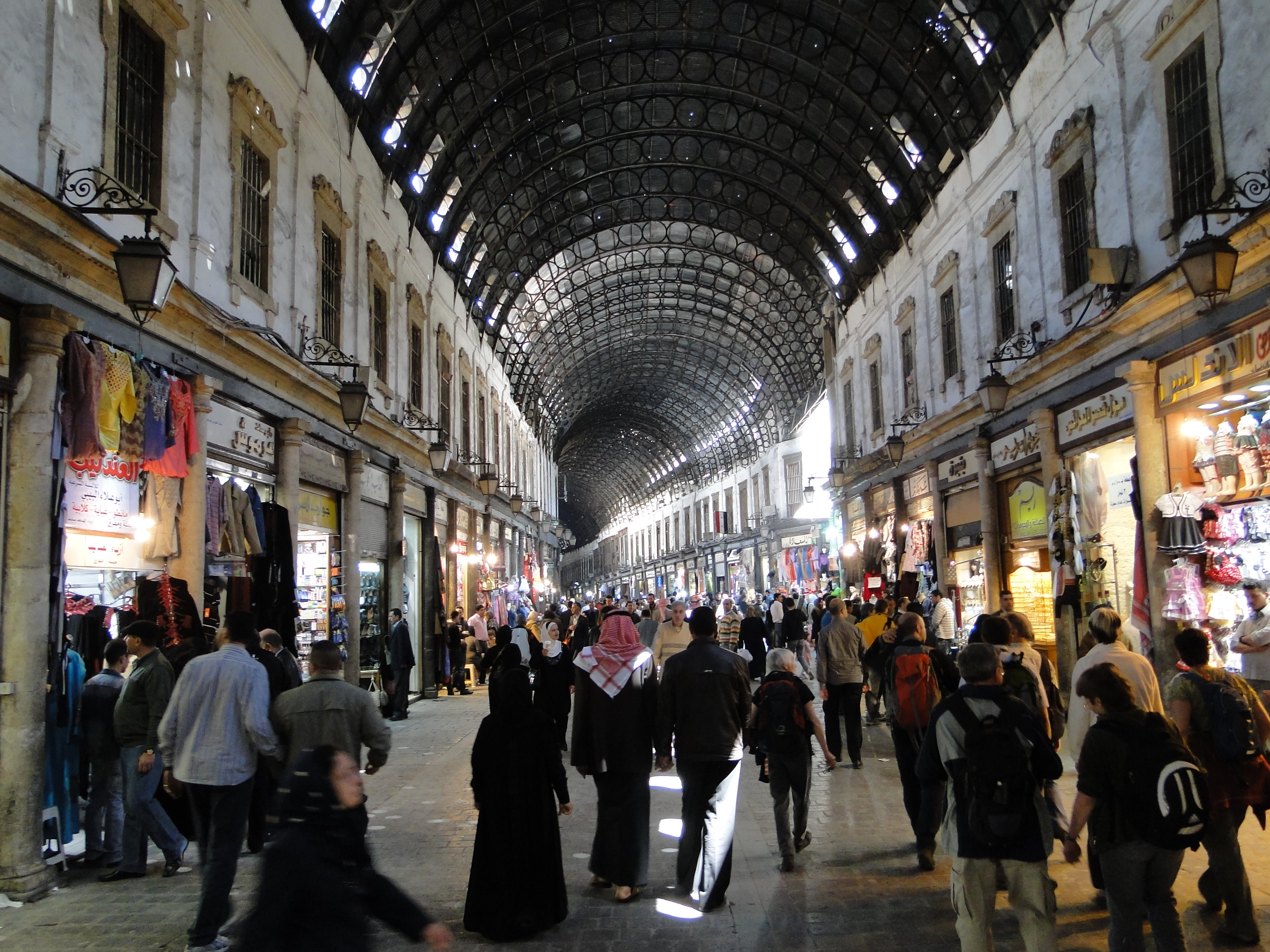
Al-Hamidiyah Souq in Damascus in 2010

Despite this, prior to the war, Syria was one of the most dynamic markets in the Middle East. The government envisioned a transition of Syria into a free market economy. The rising oil reserves triggered rapid growth in the economy, creating business opportunities for foreign firms and investments, as the booming oil and gas industry and infrastructure projects made Syria an attractive market. Prior to the war the government hoped to attract new investment in the tourism, natural gas, and service sectors to diversify its economy and reduce its dependence on oil and agriculture. The government began to institute economic reforms aimed at liberalizing most markets, but those reforms were slow and ad hoc, and were completely reversed since the outbreak of conflict. The UNDP announced in 2005 that 30% of the population lived in poverty, and 11.4% live below the subsistence level. At the outset of the civil war, Syria was classified by the World Bank as a "lower middle income country," though in 2010 Syria remained dependent on the oil and agriculture sectors. The oil sector provided about 40% of export earnings.

During the civil war, the Syrian economy relied upon dwindling customs and income taxes which are heavily bolstered by lines of credit from Iran, Russia and China. Iran is believed to have spent between $6 billion and US$20 billion per year on Syria during the first four years of the civil war. The Syrian pound lost 80% of its value, with the economy becoming part state-owned and part war economy. Proven offshore expeditions have indicated that large sums of oil exist on the Mediterranean Sea floor between Syria and Cyprus. The agriculture sector contributes to about 20% of GDP and 20% of employment. Oil reserves are expected to decrease in the coming years, and Syria has become a net oil importer. As of 2012, the value of overall exports was slashed by two-thirds, from the figure of US$12 billion in 2010 to only US$4 billion in 2012.

Since 2012, oil and tourism industries in particular have been devastated, with $5 billion lost. Sanctions have sapped the government's finances. U.S. and European Union bans on oil imports, which went into effect in 2012, are estimated to cost Syria about $400 million per month. Around 40% of all employees in the tourism sector lost their jobs since the beginning of the war. In May 2015, ISIS captured Syria's phosphate mines, one of the Syrian government's last chief sources of income. The following month, ISIS blew up a gas pipeline to Damascus that was used to generate heating and electricity in Damascus and Homs; "the name of its game for now is denial of key resources to the regime" an analyst stated. In addition, ISIS was closing in on Shaer gas field and three other facilities in the area—Hayan, Jihar and Ebla—with the loss of these western gas fields having the potential to cause Iran to further subsidize the Syrian government. Reconstruction will cost as much as $10 billion. Aleppo soap is a popular product of Syria.

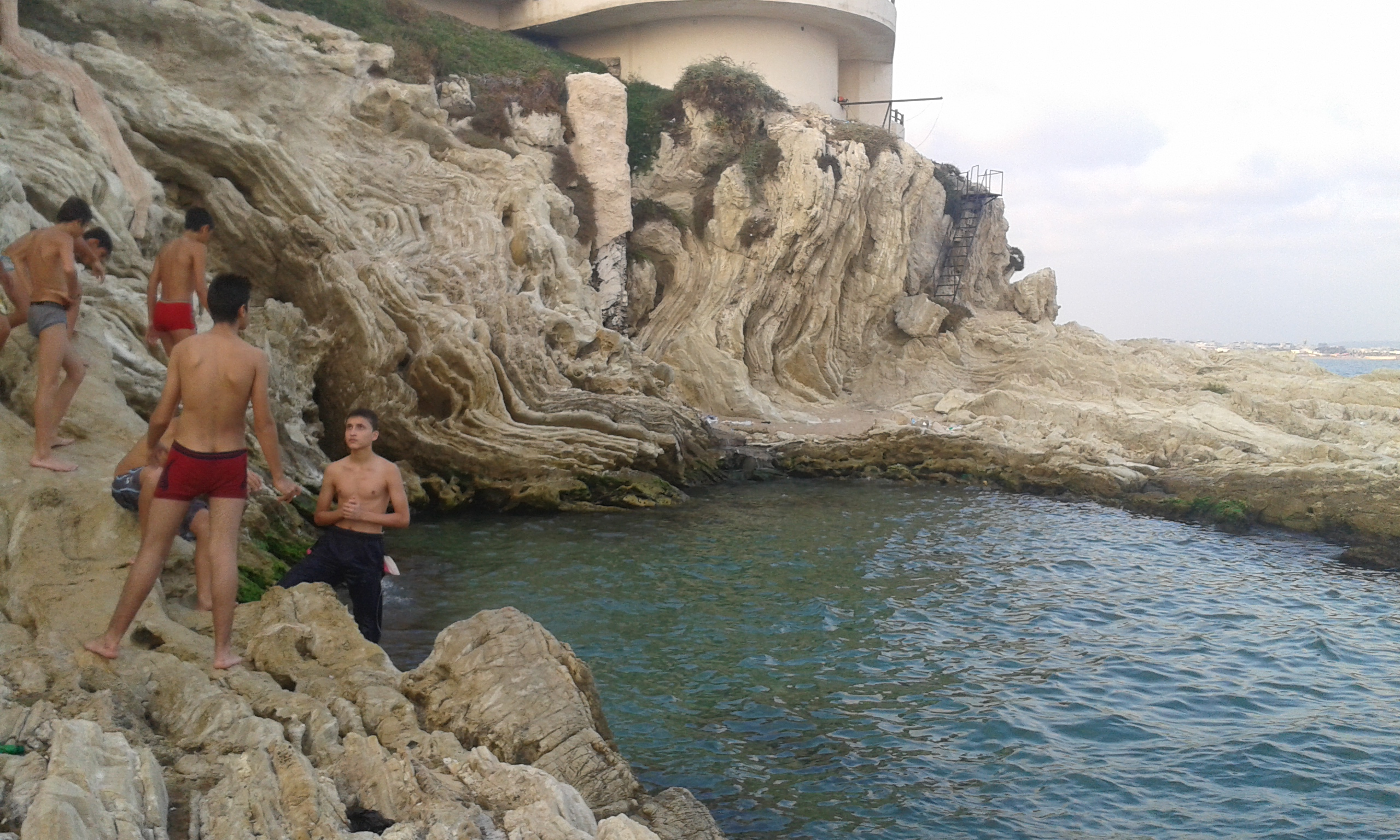
A cove in Latakia in 2014

The economy was highly regulated by the government, which increased subsidies and tightened trade controls to assuage protesters and protect foreign currency reserves. Long-run economic constraints include foreign trade barriers, declining oil production, high unemployment, rising budget deficits, and increasing pressure on water supplies caused by heavy use in agriculture, rapid population growth, industrial expansion, and water pollution. In 2024, the World Bank estimated that the Syrian GDP had contracted by 84% from 2010 to 2023. As of 2023, its GDP was $6.2 billion. Syria's new government has vowed to stamp out the production of captagon, which makes up a major portion of the informal economy. The new government will also face challenges in securing and resuming the production of oil, as rebuilding the industry will require significant investments with no guarantee of a return.

==== Drug industry ====
Prior to the fall of the Ba'athist regime, Syria was home to a burgeoning illegal drugs industry run by associates and relatives of Bashar al-Assad. It mainly produced fenethylline, or known as captagon, an addictive amphetamine popular in the Arab world. As of 2021, the export of illegal drugs eclipsed the country's legal exports, leading the New York Times to call Syria "the world's newest narcostate". The drug exports allow the government to generate hard currency and bypass international sanctions. Captagon was Syria's primary export, valued at a minimum of US$3.4 billion annually, surpassing the country's largest legal export, olive oil, which is valued at around US$122 million per year.

=== Energy ===
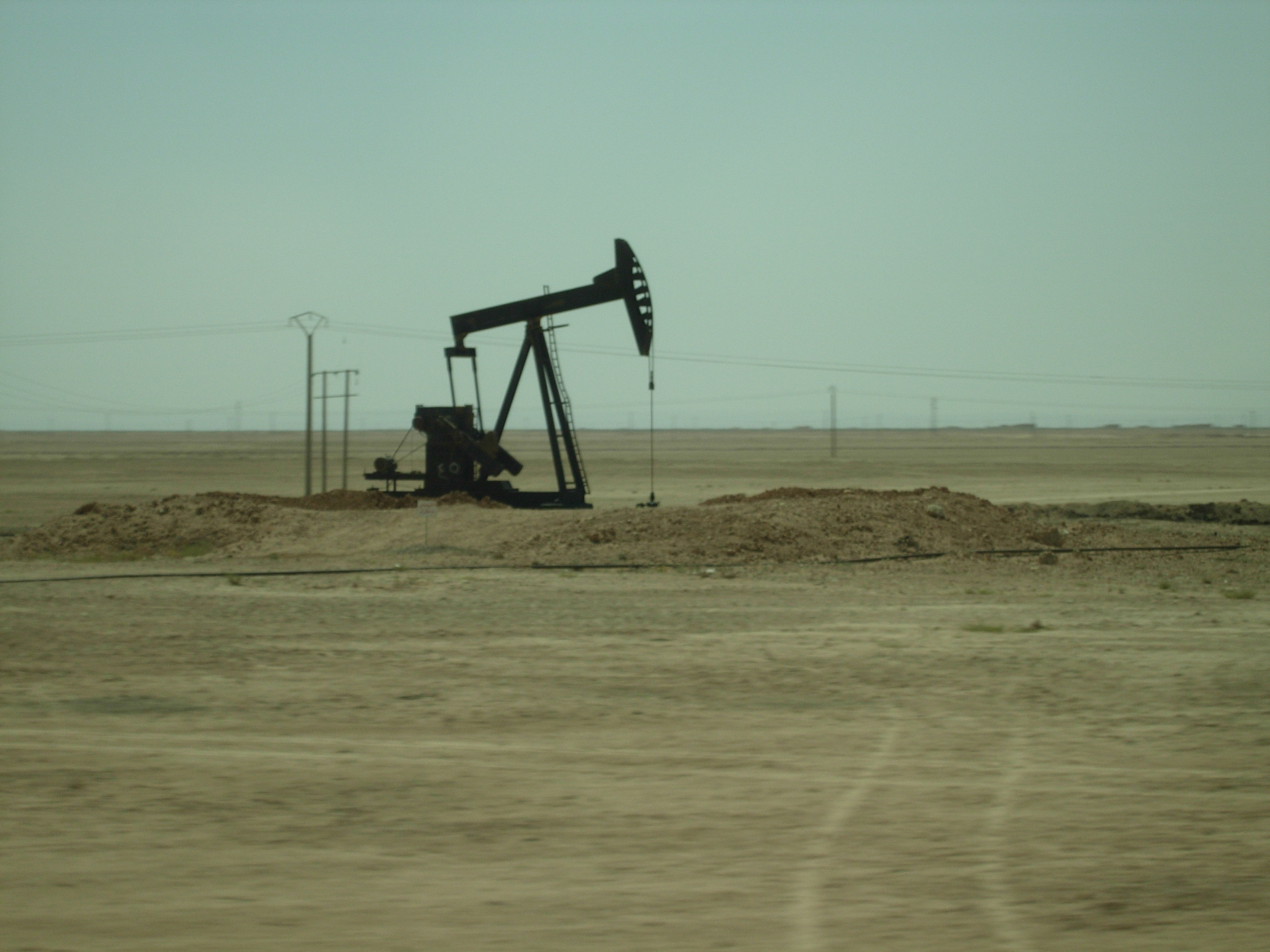
Pumpjack

Energy in Syria is mostly based on oil and gas. Some energy infrastructure was damaged by the Syrian civil war. There is high reliance on fossil fuels for energy in Syria, and electricity demand is projected to increase by 2030, especially for industry activity such as automation. However, conflict in Syria has caused electricity generation to decrease by nearly 40% in recent years due to plant destruction and fuel shortages. Electricity access in daily life for Syrians has also been altered due to conflict. Electricity to residents of Syria is largely provided by private diesel generators, which is costly and limited in hours of use. Conflict has increased household electricity expenditures while also decreasing household income. Some households have since turned to solar energy as a supplementary source of energy, though high costs limit widespread adoption.

=== Agriculture ===
Agriculture is a key part of the economy of Syria. The sector still accounts for an estimated 26 percent of gross domestic product (GDP) and represents a critical safety net for the 6.7 million Syrians – including those internally displaced – who still remain in rural areas. However, agriculture and the livelihoods that depend on it have suffered massive losses. Today, food production is at a record low and around half the population remaining in Syria are unable to meet their daily food needs.

Until the mid-1970s, agriculture in Syria was the primary economic activity in Syria. At independence in 1946, agriculture (including minor forestry and fishing) was the most important sector of the economy, and in the 1940s and early 1950s, agriculture was the fastest growing sector. Wealthy merchants from urban centers such as Aleppo invested in land development and irrigation. The rapid expansion of the cultivated area and increased output stimulated the rest of the economy. However, by the late 1950s, there was little land left that could easily be brought under cultivation. During the 1960s, agricultural output stagnated because of political instability and land reform. Between 1953 and 1976, agriculture's contribution to GDP increased (in constant prices) by only 3.2%, approximately the rate of population growth. From 1976 to 1984 growth in agriculture declined to 2% a year, and its importance in the economy declined as other sectors grew more rapidly.

In 1981, as in the 1970s, 53% of the population was still classified as rural, although movement to the cities continued to accelerate. However, in contrast to the 1970s, when 50% of the labor force was employed in agriculture, by 1983 agriculture employed only 30% of the labor force. Furthermore, by the mid-1980s, unprocessed farm products accounted for only 4% of exports, equivalent to 7% of non-petroleum exports. Industry, commerce, and transportation still depended on farm produce and related agro-business, but agriculture's preeminent position had clearly eroded. By 1985 agriculture (including a little forestry and fishing) contributed only 16.5% to GDP, down from 22.1% in 1976.

By the mid-1980s, the Syrian government had taken measures to revitalize agriculture. The 1985 investment budget saw a sharp rise in allocations for agriculture, including land reclamation and irrigation. The government's renewed commitment to agricultural development in the 1980s, by expanding cultivation and extending irrigation, promised brighter prospects for Syrian agriculture in the 1990s.

During the Syrian Civil War, the agricultural sector has witnessed a drop in producing all kinds of commodities such as wheat, cotton and olives, due to the lack of security and immigration of agricultural workforce, especially in Al-Hasakah Governorate and Aleppo Governorate.

=== Transport ===
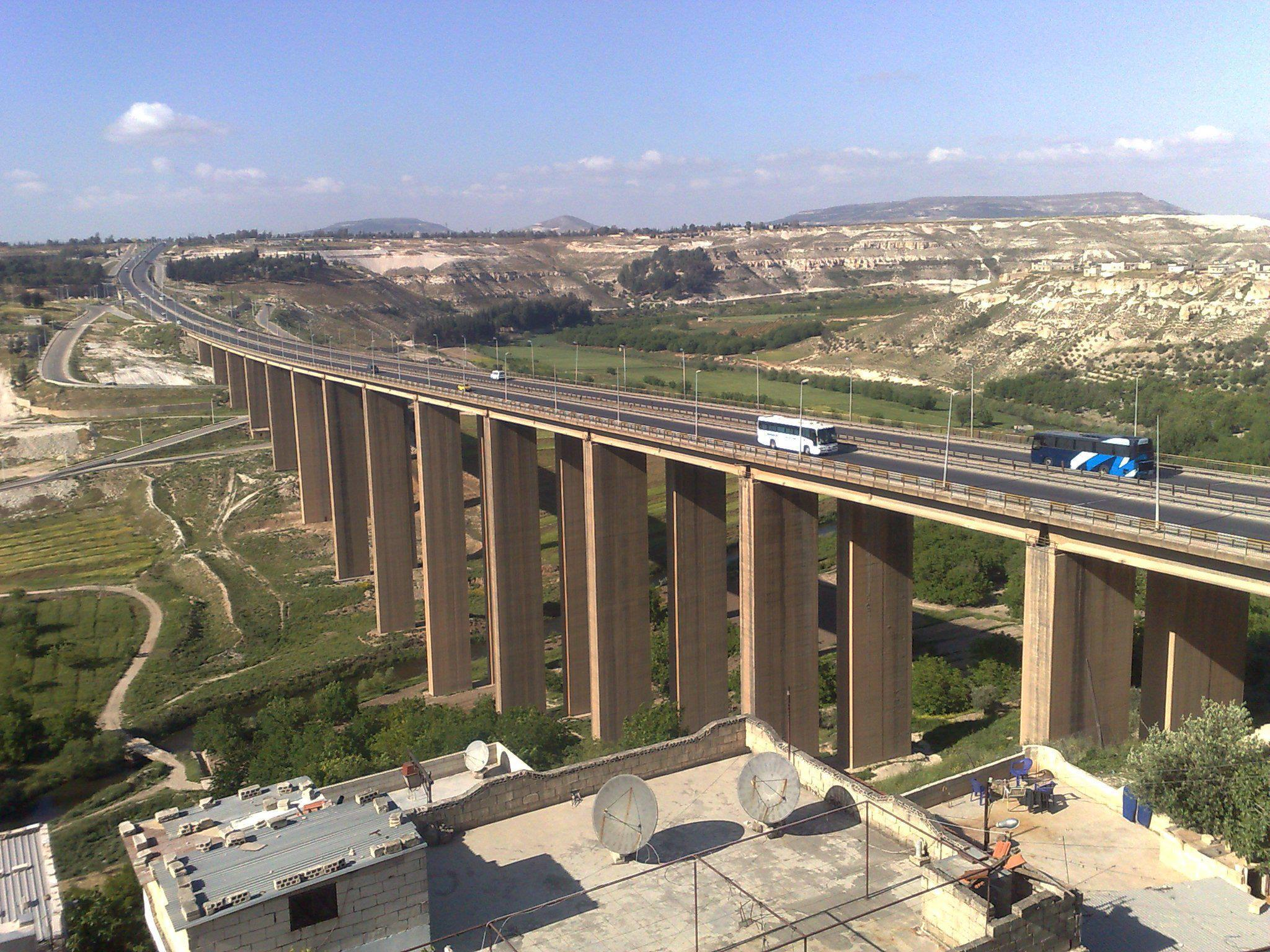
Expressway M5 near Al-Rastan, Homs

Syria has four international airports (Damascus, Aleppo, Latakia and Qamishli), which serve as hubs for Syrian Air and Fly Cham and are also served by a variety of foreign carriers.

Syria has 2,850 kilometres (1,770 mi) of railways, out of which 1,500 kilometres (930 mi) are out of operation in 2025 because of damage sustained during the civil war. The rolling stock is also in a state of disrepair. As of 2024 there are no international rail services, but high-speed rail in Turkey is being extended close to the border. The last train between Syria and Jordan operated in September 2011, and the transitional government plans to rebuild the Syrian section of the Hejaz Jordan Railway. The first trial run of a passenger train between Aleppo and Hama took place in August 2025 after months of renovation work, with plans to restore regular service between the two cities.

The road network in Syria is 69,873 kilometres (43,417 miles) long, including 1,103 kilometres (685 miles) of expressways. The country also has 900 kilometres (560 miles) of navigable but not economically significant waterways.

=== Internet and telecommunications ===
Telecommunications in Syria are overseen by the Ministry of Communications and Information Technology. In addition, Syrian Telecom plays an integral role in the distribution of internet access.

During the Syrian civil war, the Syrian Electronic Army, served as a Ba'athist-backed pro-Assad regime group in cyberspace, and according to Vice, were supposedly an enemy of the decentralized hacktivist collective Anonymous. Under Ba'athist rule, 13,000 internet activists were arrested in 2011 and 2012.

=== Water supply and sanitation ===
Syria is a semiarid country with scarce water resources. The largest water consuming sector in Syria is agriculture. Domestic water use stands at only about 9% of total water use. A big challenge for Syria before the civil war was its high population growth (in 2006 the growth rate was 2.7%), leading to rapidly increasing demand for urban and industrial water.

== Demographics ==
Historical populations
Year	Pop.	±% p.a.
1960	4,565,000	—
1970	6,305,000	+3.28%
1981	9,046,000	+3.34%
1994	13,782,000	+3.29%
2004	17,921,000	+2.66%
2011	21,124,000	+2.38%
2015	18,734,987	−2.96%
2019	18,528,105	−0.28%
2024	24,672,760	+5.90%
2019 estimate 2024 estimate Source: Syrian Planning and Statistics Commission of the Syrian Arab Republic, 2011

Most people live in the Euphrates River valley and along the coastal plain, a fertile strip between the coastal mountains and the desert. Overall population density before the civil war was about 99 per square kilometre (258 per square mile). According to the World Refugee Survey 2008, published by the U.S. Committee for Refugees and Immigrants, Syria hosted a population of refugees and asylum seekers numbering approximately 1,852,300. The vast majority of this population was from Iraq (1,300,000), but sizeable populations from Palestine (543,400) and Somalia (5,200) also lived in the country.

In what the UN has described as "the biggest humanitarian emergency of our era", by 2014 about 9.5 million Syrians, half the population, had been displaced since March 2011; 4 million were outside the country as refugees. By 2020, the UN estimated that over 5.5 million Syrians were living as refugees in the region, and 6.1 million others were internally displaced.

=== Largest cities ===
Largest cities or towns in Syria Syrian Planning and Statistics Commission (2004 Census)
Rank	Name	Province	Pop.	Rank	Name	Province	Pop.
1	Aleppo	Aleppo Governorate	2,132,100	11	Tartus	Tartus Governorate	115,769
2	Damascus	Damascus	1,552,161	12	Jaramana	Rif Dimashq Governorate	114,363
3	Homs	Homs Governorate	652,609	13	Douma	Rif Dimashq Governorate	110,893
4	Latakia	Latakia Governorate	383,786	14	Manbij	Aleppo Governorate	99,497
5	Hama	Hama Governorate	312,994	15	Idlib	Idlib Governorate	98,791
6	Raqqa	Raqqa Governorate	220,488	16	Daraa	Daraa Governorate	97,969
7	Deir ez-Zor	Deir ez-Zor Governorate	211,857	17	Al-Hajar al-Aswad	Rif Dimashq Governorate	84,948
8	Hasakah	Hasakah Governorate	188,160	18	Darayya	Rif Dimashq Governorate	78,763
9	Qamishli	Hasakah Governorate	184,231	19	Suwayda	Suwayda Governorate	73,641
10	Sayyidah Zaynab	Rif Dimashq Governorate	136,427	20	Tabqa	Raqqa Governorate	69,425

=== Ethnic groups ===
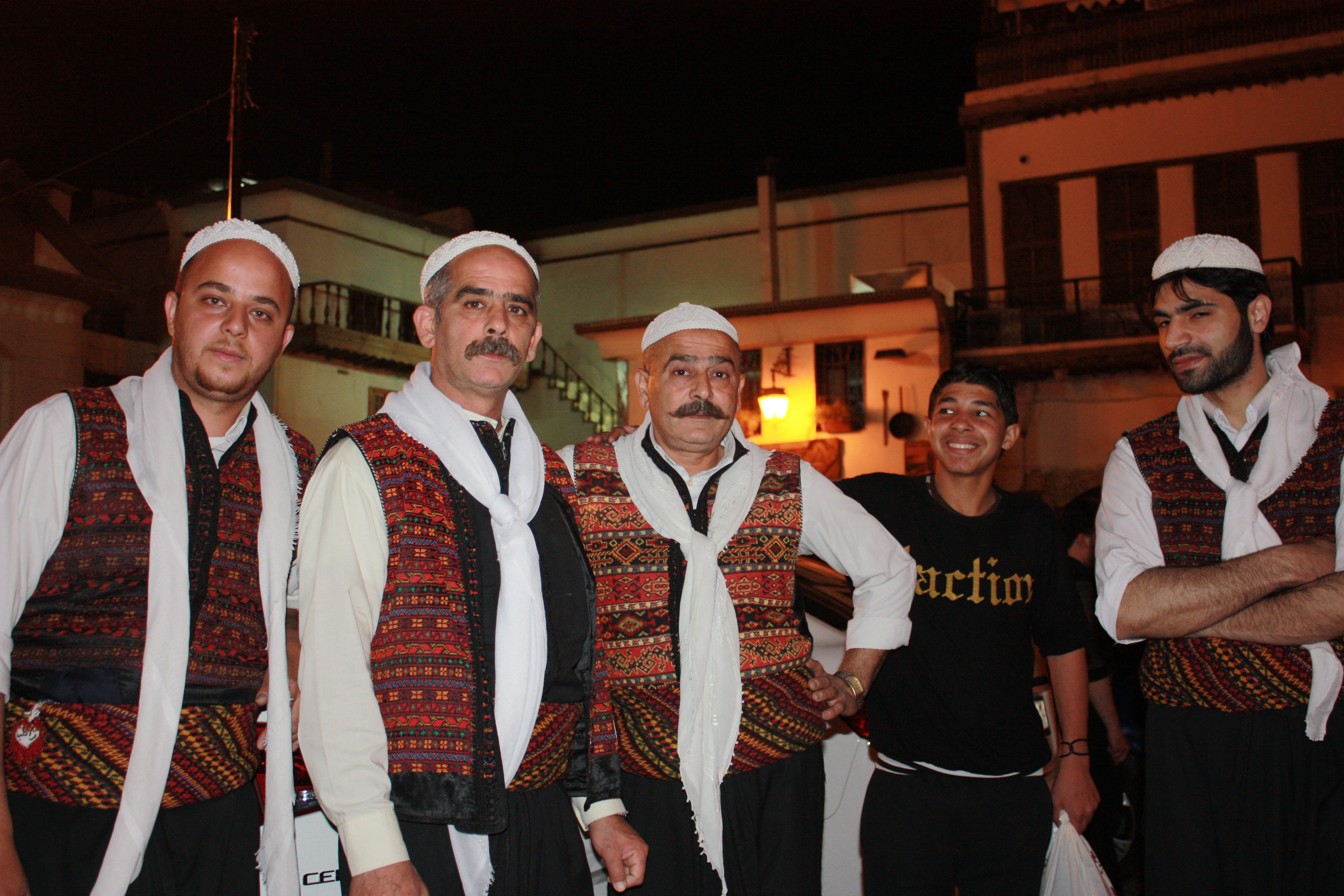
Damascus traditional clothing

Syrians are an overall indigenous Levantine people, closely related to their immediate neighbors, such as Lebanese, Palestinians, Jordanians and Jews. Syria has a population of approximately 26,000,000 (2025 estimate). Syrian Arabs, together with some 600,000 Palestinian not including the 6 million refugees outside the country make up roughly 74% of the population. The indigenous Assyrians and Western Aramaic-speakers number around 400,000 people, with the Western Aramaic-speakers living mainly in the villages of Maaloula, Jubb'adin and Bakh'a, while the Assyrians mainly reside in the north and northeast (Homs, Aleppo, Qamishli, Hasakah). Many (particularly the Assyrian group) still retain several Neo-Aramaic dialects as spoken and written languages.

The second-largest ethnic group in Syria are the Kurds. They constitute about 9% to 10% of the population, or approximately 2 million people (including 40,000 Yazidis). Most Kurds reside in the northeastern corner of Syria and most speak the Kurmanji variant of the Kurdish language. The third largest ethnic group are the Turkish-speaking Syrian Turkmen/Turkoman. There are no reliable estimates of their total population, with estimates ranging from several hundred thousand to 3.5 million. The fourth largest ethnic group are the Assyrians (3–4%), followed by the Circassians (1.5%) and the Armenians (1%), most of which are the descendants of refugees who arrived in Syria during the Armenian genocide. Syria holds the 7th largest Armenian population in the world. They are mainly gathered in Aleppo, Qamishli, Damascus and Kesab.

The ethno-religious composition of Syria

There are also smaller ethnic minority groups, such as the Albanians, Bosnians, Georgians, Greeks, Persians, Pashtuns and Russians. However, most of these ethnic minorities have become Arabized to some degree, particularly those who practice the Muslim faith. The largest concentration of the Syrian diaspora outside the Arab world is in Brazil, which has millions of people of Arab and other Near Eastern ancestries. Brazil is the first country in the Americas to offer humanitarian visas to Syrian refugees. The majority of Arab Argentines are from either Lebanese or Syrian background.

=== Languages ===
Arabic is the official language of the country. Several modern Arabic dialects are used in everyday life, most notably Levantine in the west and Mesopotamian in the northeast. According to The Encyclopedia of Arabic Language and Linguistics, in addition to Arabic, the following languages are spoken in the country, in order of the number of speakers: Kurdish (recognized in 2026 as a national language of Syria), Turkish, Neo-Aramaic (four dialects), Circassian, Chechen, Armenian, and finally Greek. Besides Kurdish, none of these minority languages have official status.

Many educated Syrians speak English, Russian, and French (especially among the bourgeoisie and the Christian community; there are fewer than 4,500 French speakers today), but English is more widely understood (between 650,000 and one million speakers, as a second language). Before the start of the Syrian civil war, around 8,000 students were enrolled in French-speaking Catholic schools.

Aramaic was the lingua franca of the region before the advent of Arabic, and is still spoken among Assyrians, and Classical Syriac is still used as the liturgical language of various Syriac Christian denominations. Most remarkably, Western Neo-Aramaic is still spoken in the village of Maaloula as well as two neighboring villages, 56 km (35 mi) northeast of Damascus. English and French are widely spoken as second languages, but English is more often used.

=== Religion ===
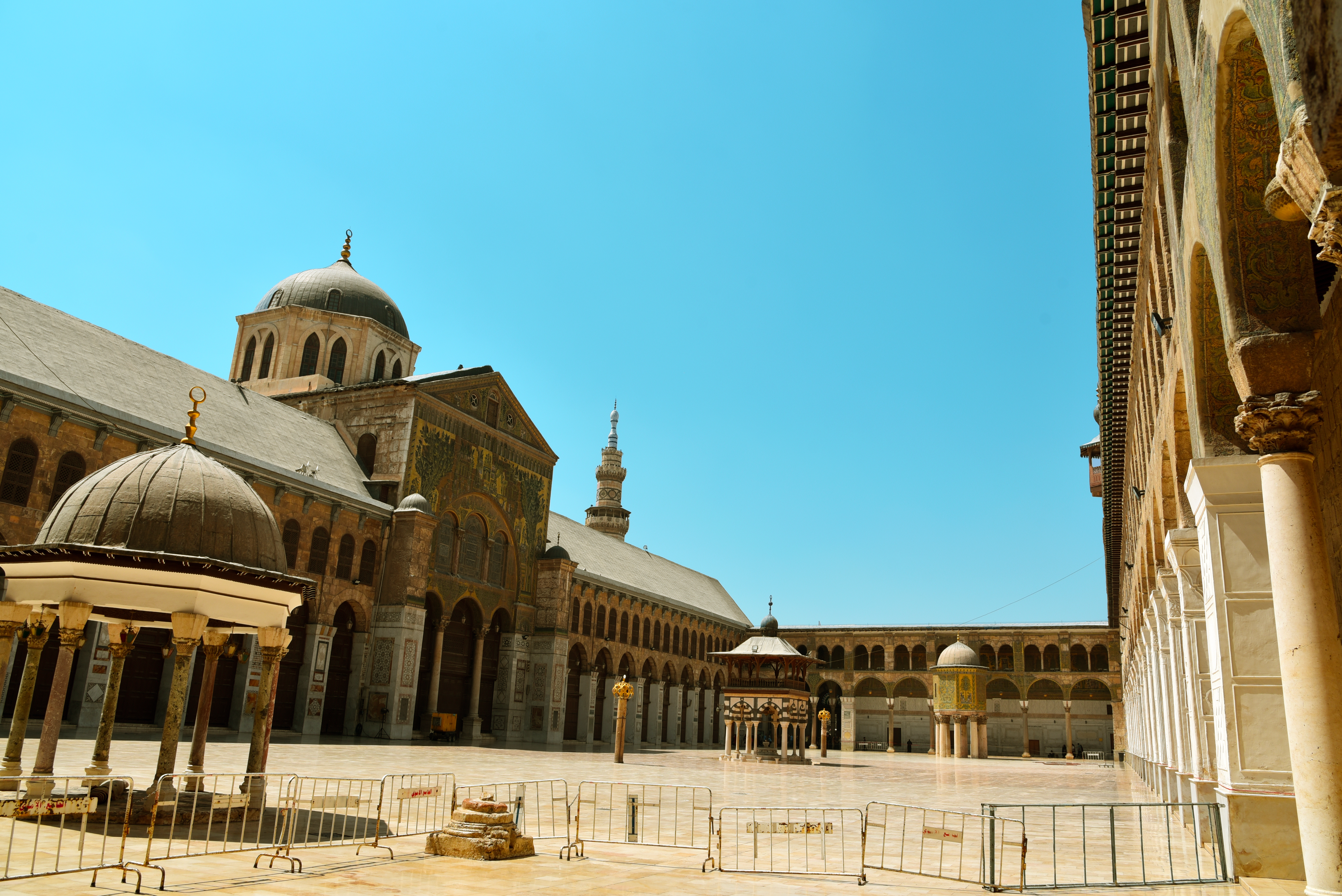
Umayyad Mosque

Islam is the largest and predominant religion in Syria, comprising 87% of the population. Sunni Muslims make up around 74% of the population and Sunni Arabs account for 59–60%. Most Kurds (8.5%) and most Turkmens (3%) are Sunni, while 3% of Syrians are Shia Muslims (particularly Ismailis, and Twelvers but there are also Arabs, Kurds and Turkmens), 10% are Alawites, 10% are Christians (the majority are Antiochian Greek Orthodox, the rest are Syriac Orthodox, Greek Catholic and other Catholic Rites, Armenian Orthodox, Assyrian Church of the East, Protestants and other denominations), and 3% Druzes. According to the Association of Religion Data Archives (ARDA), 94.17% of Syrians are Muslims–79.19% are Sunnis and 14.10% are Shias (including Alawites)–and 3.84% of Syrians are Christians as of 2020.

Syria has the largest Druze population in the world and form around 3% of the population. They number between 500,000 to 700,000 and concentrate mainly in the southern area of Jabal al-Druze and form majority in the Suwayda Governorate

Because the Assad family is Alawite, Alawites have historically dominated key government and military positions.

Christians numbering 1.2 million, a sizable number of whom are found among Syria's population of Palestinian and Iraqi refugees, are divided into several denominations. The Greek Orthodox Church makes up 45.7% of the Christian population in Syria, whilst Syriac Orthodox make up 22.4%; the Armenian Orthodox make up 10.9% and Catholicism (including Greek Catholic, Syriac Catholic, Armenian Catholic, Maronite, Chaldean Catholic and Latin) make up 16.2%; Assyrian Church of the East and several smaller Christian denominations account for the remainder. Many Christian monasteries also exist. Many Christian Syrians belong to a high socio-economic class. As per one estimate, the count of Christians affiliated with established denominations in Syria has dropped from approximately 2.5 million prior to the civil war, to about 500,000 in 2023.

Syria was once home to a substantial population of Jews, with large communities in Damascus, Aleppo, and Qamishli. Due to a combination of persecution in Syria and opportunities elsewhere, the Jews began to emigrate in the second half of the 19th century to Great Britain, the United States, and Israel. The process was completed with the establishment of Israel in 1948. The remaining Jewish population dwindled as a result of the civil war. Today 100 Jews live in Syria. The United States is home to a large Syrian Jewish community, which is still considered as Syrian citizens by the Syrian government.

=== Education ===
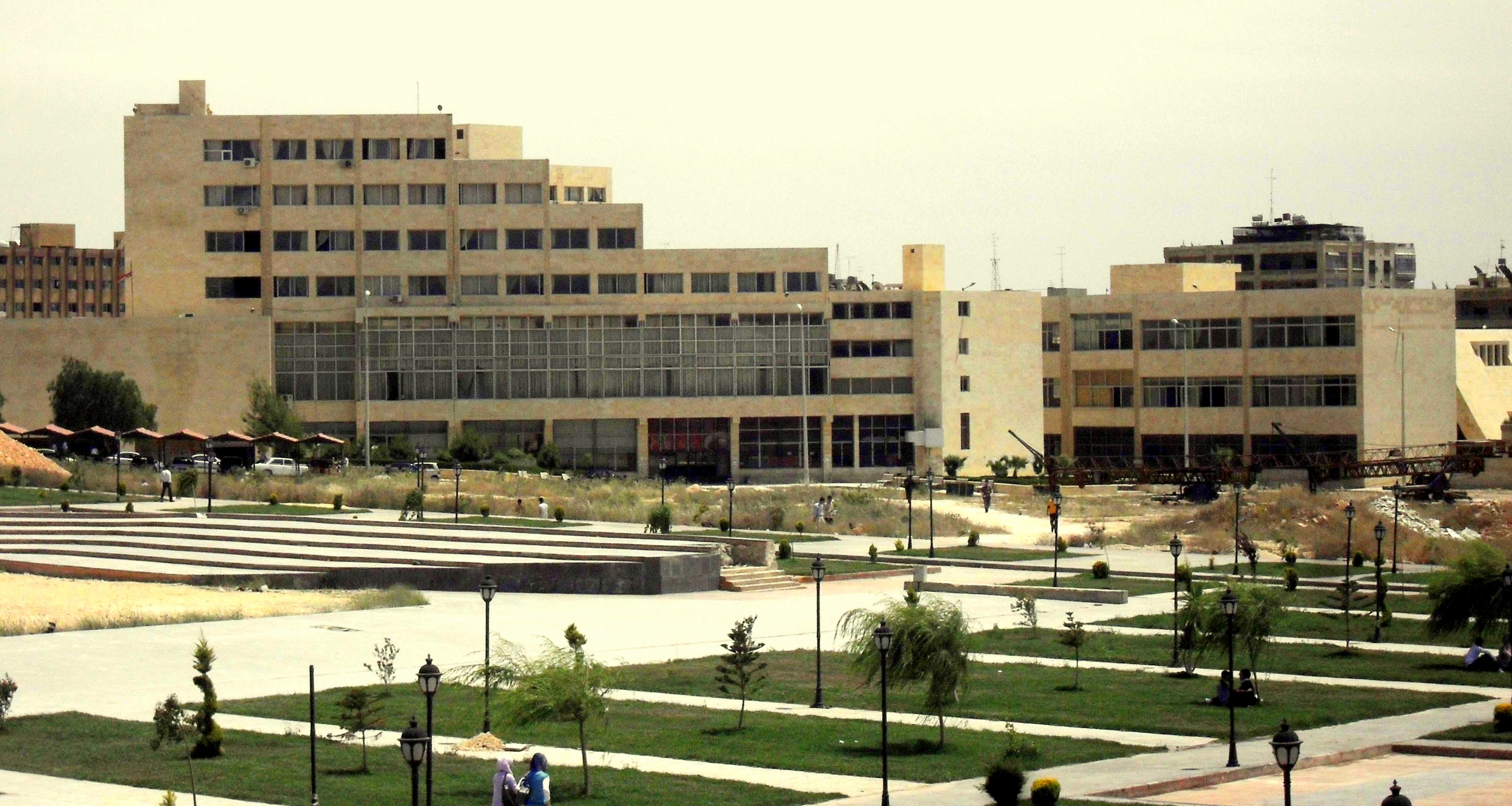
Faculty of Arts and Humanities in Aleppo University

Education is free and compulsory from ages 6 to 12. Schooling consists of six years of primary education followed by a three-year general or vocational training period and a three-year academic or vocational program. The second three-year period of academic training is required for university admission. Total enrollment at post-secondary schools is over 150,000. The literacy rate of Syrians aged 15 and older is 90.7% for males and 82.2% for females.

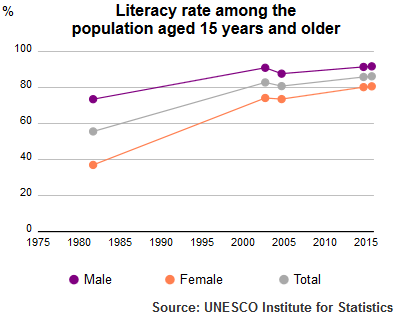
UIS adult literacy rate of Syria

There are ten public universities in Syria and 39 private universities. The top two state universities are Damascus University (210,000 students as of 2014) and University of Aleppo. The top private universities in Syria are: Syrian Private University, Arab International University, University of Kalamoon and International University for Science and Technology. There are also many higher institutes in Syria, like the Higher Institute of Business Administration, which offer undergraduate and graduate programs in business.

=== Health ===
The Syrian civil war profoundly impacted the nation's health demographics and infrastructure. As of 2023, the World Health Organization (WHO) estimated Syria's population at approximately 23.6 million.

In 2021, the average life expectancy in Syria was 73.1 years. The infant mortality rate has seen a decline over recent years, with estimates indicating 12.1 deaths per 1,000 live births in 2022. The under-five mortality rate was reported at 21.4 deaths per 1,000 live births.

Prior to the conflict, Syria had a maternal mortality ratio of 52 deaths per 100,000 live births in 2009. However, the war disrupted maternal healthcare services, leading to increased risks for pregnant women.

The protracted conflict severely damaged Syria's healthcare infrastructure. In 2023 over half of the country's hospitals were non-functional, and approximately 15.3 million people were in need of health support, representing 72% of the population. This marked a 25% increase from 2022, highlighting the escalating health crisis.

Non-communicable diseases, particularly cardiovascular conditions, were leading causes of death before the conflict. However, during the war, conflict-related injuries and deaths surged, significantly altering the health landscape.

== Culture ==
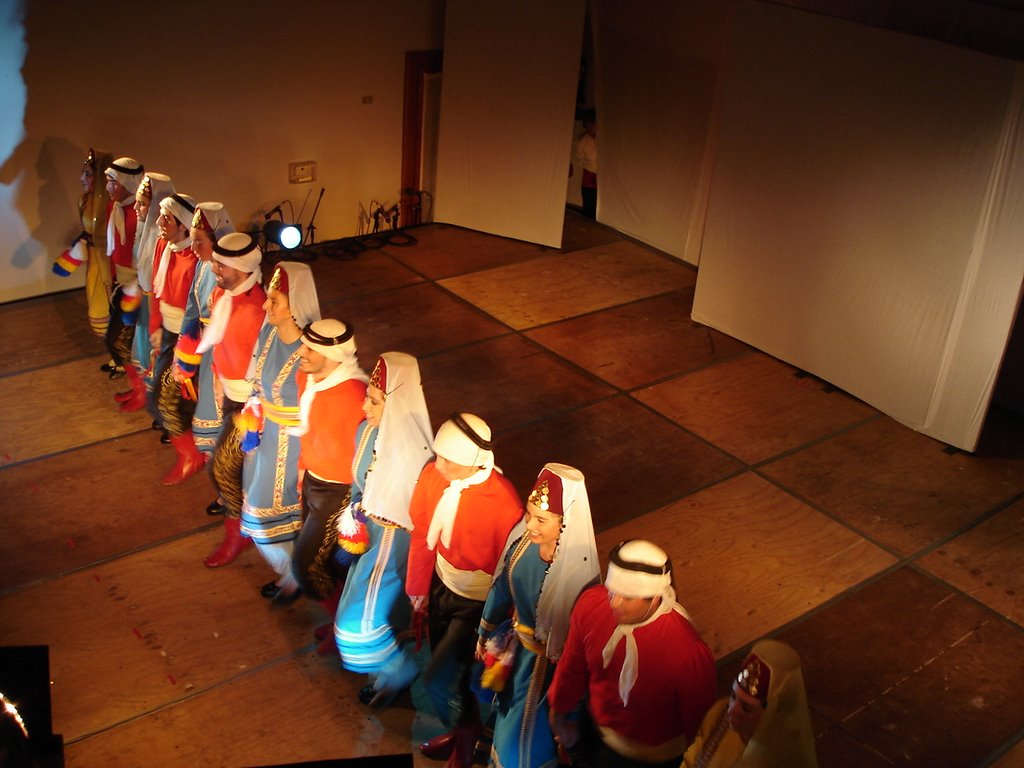
Dabke combines circle dance and line dancing and is widely performed at weddings and other joyous occasions.

Syria is a traditional society with a long cultural history. Importance is placed on family, religion, education, self-discipline and respect. Syrians' taste for the traditional arts is expressed in dances such as the al-Samah, the Dabkeh in all their variations, and the sword dance. Marriage ceremonies and the births of children are occasions for the lively demonstration of folk customs.

=== Cuisine ===
Syrian cuisine is rich and varied in its ingredients, linked to the regions where a specific dish has originated. Syrian food mostly consists of southern Mediterranean, Greek, and Southwest Asian dishes. Some Syrian dishes also evolved from Turkish and French cooking: dishes like shish kebab, stuffed zucchini/courgette, and yabraʾ (stuffed grape leaves, the word yabraʾ deriving from the Turkish word yaprak, meaning leaf).

The main dishes are kibbeh, hummus, tabbouleh, fattoush, labneh, shawarma, mujaddara, shanklish, pastırma, sujuk and baklava. Baklava is made of filo pastry filled with chopped nuts and soaked in honey. Syrians often serve selections of appetizers, known as meze, before the main course. Za'atar, minced beef, and cheese manakish are popular hors d'œuvres. The Arabic flatbread khubz is always eaten together with meze.

Drinks vary, depending on the time of day and the occasion. Arabic coffee is the most well-known hot drink, usually prepared in the morning at breakfast or in the evening. It is usually served for guests or after food. Arak, an alcoholic drink, is a well-known beverage, served mostly on special occasions. Other Syrian beverages include ayran, jallab, white coffee, and a locally manufactured beer called Al Shark.

=== Literature ===
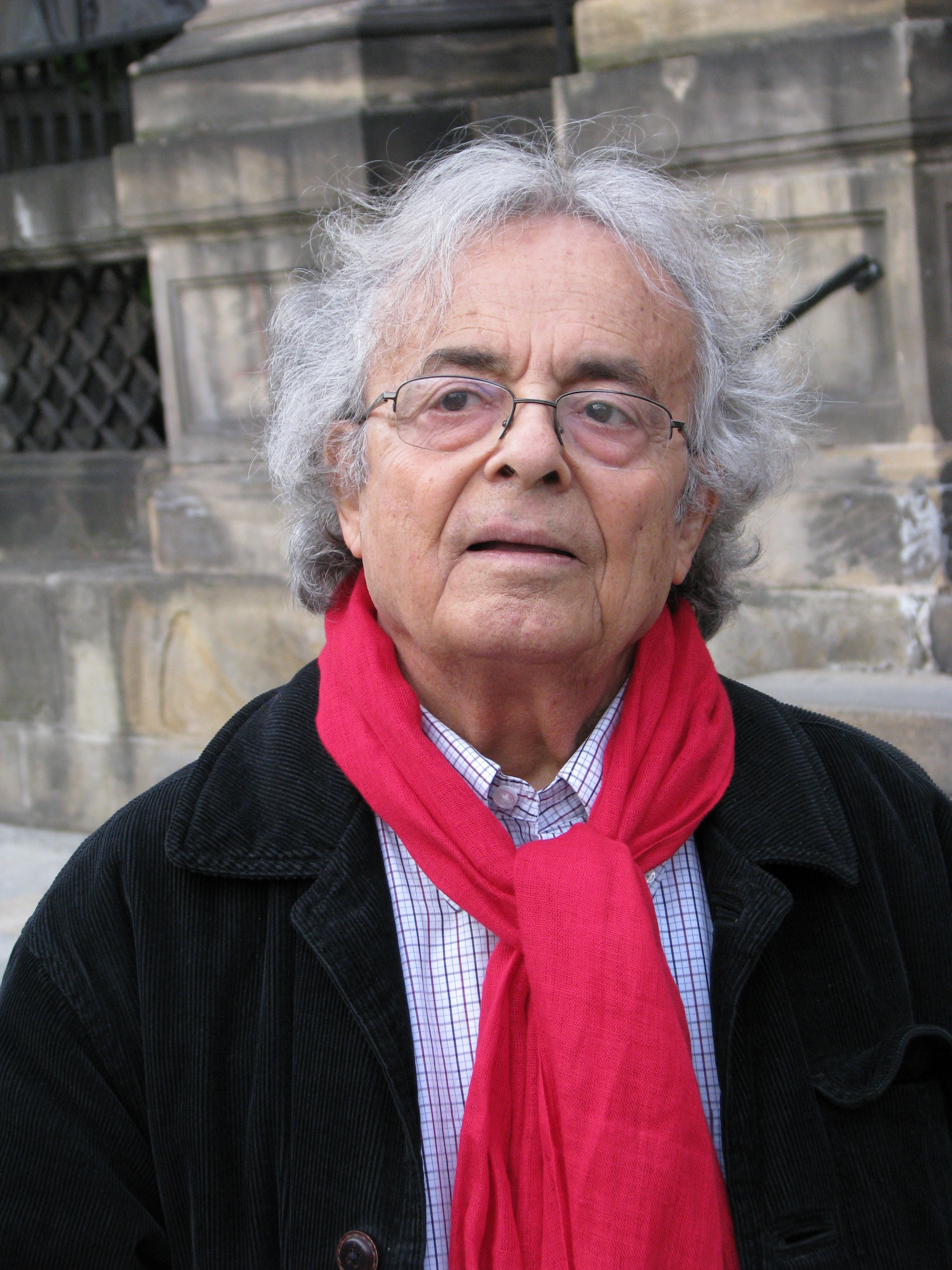
Syrian poet, essayist and translator Adunis

The literature of Syria has contributed to Arabic literature and has a proud tradition of oral and written poetry. Syrian writers, many of whom migrated to Egypt, played a crucial role in the nahda or Arab literary and cultural revival of the 19th century. Prominent contemporary Syrian writers include, among others, Adonis, Muhammad Maghout, Haidar Haidar, Ghada al-Samman, Nizar Qabbani and Zakariyya Tamer.

Ba'ath Party rule brought about renewed censorship. In this context, the genre of the historical novel, spearheaded by Nabil Sulayman, Fawwaz Haddad, Khyri al-Dhahabi and Nihad Siris, is sometimes used as a means of expressing dissent, critiquing the present through a depiction of the past. Syrian folk narrative, as a subgenre of historical fiction, is imbued with magical realism, and is also used as a means of veiled criticism of the present. Salim Barakat, a Syrian émigré living in Sweden, is one of the leading figures of the genre. Contemporary Syrian literature also encompasses science fiction and futuristic utopiae (Nuhad Sharif, Talib Umran), which may also serve as media of dissent.

=== Music ===
The Syrian music scene, in particular that of Damascus, has long been among the Arab world's most important, especially in the field of classical Arab music. Syria has produced several pan-Arab stars, including Asmahan, Farid al-Atrash and singer Lena Chamamyan. The city of Aleppo is known for its muwashshah, a form of Andalous sung poetry popularized by Sabri Moudallal, as well as for popular stars like Sabah Fakhri.

=== Media ===
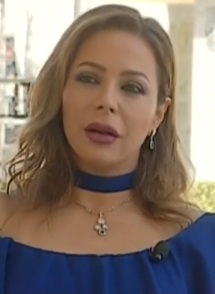
Suzan Najm Aldeen, Syrian actress

Television was introduced to Syria and Egypt in 1960, when both were part of the United Arab Republic. It broadcast in black and white until 1976. Syrian soap operas have considerable market penetration throughout the eastern Arab world.

During Ba'athist Syria, nearly all of Syria's media outlets were state-owned. The authorities operated several intelligence agencies, among them Shu'bat al-Mukhabarat al-'Askariyya, employing many operatives. During the civil war many of Syria's artists, poets, writers and activists had been incarcerated, and some have been killed, including famed cartoonist Akram Raslan.

More than a year after Assad's fall, Syria's media landscape has opened considerably, with state outlets being restructured and exiled and opposition media returning. The authorities are preparing a new media law, while press freedom groups are calling for independent regulation, protection of sources and safeguards against the detention of journalists. Political instability, weak legal frameworks, poor infrastructure, limited funding and low public trust remain major challenges.

== See also ==
- Outline of Syria
- Borders of Syria
