= List of national and international statistical services =

The following is a list of national and international statistical services.

== Central national statistical services ==
Nearly every country in the world has set a central public sector unit entirely devoted to the production, harmonisation and dissemination of official statistics that the public sector and the national community need to run, monitor and evaluate their operations and policies. This central statistical organisation does not produce every official statistic as other public sector organisations, like the national central bank or ministries in charge of agriculture, education or health, may be charged with producing and disseminating sector policy oriented statistical data. The statistical legislation and regulation generally attribute responsibilities and authorities according to statistical domains or functions in addition to those of the central unit.

The table below lists these central statistical organisations by country. The United States has no central producing unit, but several units (also listed below) have been given responsibility over various federal statistics domains (see also: Federal Statistical System of the United States).

=== Africa ===
Country	Organisation	Website
Algeria	National Office of Statistics	ons.dz
Angola	Instituto Nacional de Estatística	ine.gov.ao
Benin	Institut National de la Statistique et de la Démographie	instad-bj
Botswana	Statistics Botswana	statsbots.org.bw
Burkina Faso	Institut national de la statistique et de la démographie	insd.bf
Burundi	Institut de statistiques et d’études économiques du Burundi	isteebu.bi
Cameroon	National Institute of Statistics	statistics-cameroon.org
Central African Republic	Institut centrafricain des statistiques, des études économiques et sociales	icasees.org
Cape Verde	Instituto Nacional de Estatística	ine.cv
Chad	Institut national de la statistique, des études économiques et démographiques	inseed.td
Comoros	Direction de la Statistique	inseed.km
Democratic Republic of Congo	Institut national de la statistique	ins-rdc.org
Congo	L’Institut National de la Statistique	ins-congo.cg
Djibouti	Institut des Statistiques de Djibouti	instad.dj
Egypt	Central Agency for Public Mobilization and Statistics	capmas.gov.eg
Equatorial Guinea	Instituto Nacional de Estadística de Guinea Ecuatorial	inege.org
Eritrea	National Statistics and Evaluation Office	none
Ethiopia	Ethiopian Statistics Service	statsethiopia.gov.et
Gabon	Direction générale de la statistique et des études économiques	stat-gabon.org
The Gambia	The Gambia Bureau of Statistics	gbosdata.org/
Ghana	Ghana Statistical Service	statsghana.gov.gh
Guinea	Institut National de la Statistique	stat-guinee.org
Guinea-Bissau	Instituto Nacional de Estatistica da Guiné-Bissau	stat-guinebissau.com
Ivory Coast	Institut National de la Statistique de Côte d'Ivoire	ins.ci
Kenya	Kenya national bureau of statistics	knbs.go.ke
Lesotho	Bureau of Statistics	bos.gov.ls
Liberia	Liberia Institute of Statistics and Geo-Information Services	lisgis.gov.lr
Libya	Bureau of Statistics and Census	bsc.ly
Madagascar	Institut national de la statistique	instat.mg
Malawi	National Statistical Office	nsomalawi.mw
Mali	Institut national de la statistique	instat-mali.org
Mauritania	Office national de la statistique	ons.mr
Mauritius	Statistics Mauritius	statsmauritius.govmu.org
Morocco	Haut Commissariat au Plan du Maroc	hcp.ma
Mozambique	National Institute of Statistics (Instituto Nacional de Estatística)	ine.gov.mz
Namibia	Namibia Statistics Authority	nsa.org.na
Niger	Institut National de la Statistique du Niger	stat-niger.org
Nigeria	National Bureau of Statistics of Nigeria	nigerianstat.gov.ng
Rwanda	National Institute of Statistics of Rwanda	statistics.gov.rw
São Tomé and Príncipe	Instituto Nacional de Estatistica	ine.st
Senegal	Agence nationale de la statistique et de la démographie	ansd.sn
Seychelles	National Statistics Bureau	nbs.gov.sc
Sierra Leone	Statistics Sierra Leone	statistics.sl
Somalia	Somalia National Bureau of Statistics	nbs.gov.so
South Africa	Statistics South Africa	statssa.gov.za
South Sudan	National Bureau of Statistics	ssnb.org
Sudan	Central Bureau of Statistics of Sudan	cbs.gov.sd
Eswatini	Central Statistics Office of Eswatini	www.gov.sz/index.php?option=com_content&view=article&id=687:central-statistics-office
Tanzania	Jamhuri ya Muungano wa Tanzania Ofisi ya Taifa ya Takwimu	nbs.go.tz
Togo	Direction générale de la statistique et de la comptabilité nationale (Direction générale de la statistique et de la comptabilité nationale) (DGSCN) (in French)	inseed.tg
Tunisia	National Institute of Statistics (INS)	ins.tn
Uganda	Uganda Bureau of Statistics	ubos.org
Zambia	Central Statistical Office of Zambia	zamstats.gov.zm
Zimbabwe	Central Statistical Office of Zimbabwe	zimstat.co.zw

=== Americas ===
Country	Organisation	Website
Antigua and Barbuda	National Bureau of Statistics	statistics.gov.ag
Argentina	Instituto Nacional de Estadística y Censos (INDEC)	indec.gob.ar
Aruba	Central Bureau of Statistics	www.cbs.aw
Bahamas	Bahamas National Statistics Institute	stats.gov.bs
Barbados	Barbados Statistical Service	stats.gov.bb
Belize	Statistical Institute of Belize	sib.org.bz
Bolivia	Instituto Nacional de Estadística	ine.gob.bo
Brazil	Brazilian Institute of Geography and Statistics (IBGE)	ibge.gov.br
Canada	Statistics Canada	statcan.gc.ca
Chile	Instituto Nacional de Estadísticas	ine.cl
Colombia	National Administrative Department of Statistics (Departamento Administrativo Nacional de Estadistica) (DANE)	dane.gov.co
Costa Rica	Instituto Nacional de Estadística y Censos	inec.go.cr
Cuba	Oficina Nacional de Estadísticas (ONE)	http://www.onei.gob.cu/
Curaçao	Central Bureau of Statistics Curaçao	www.cbs.cw
Dominica	Central Statistics Office of Dominica	stats.gov.dm
Dominican Republic	Oficina Nacional de Estadistica	one.gob.do
Ecuador	Instituto Nacional de Estadística y Censos (INEC)	ecuadorencifras.gob.ec
El Salvador	Oficina Nacional de Estadística y Censos (ONEC) del Banco Central de Reserva de El Salvador	onec.bcr.gob.sv
Grenada	Central Statistical Office	stats.gov.gd
Guatemala	Instituto Nacional de Estadística	ine.gob.gt
Guyana	Guyana Bureau of Statistics	statisticsguyana.gov.gy
Haiti	Institut haïtien de statistique et d’informatique (IHSI)	hihsi.gouv.ht/
Honduras	Instituto Nacional de Estadística (INE)	ine.gob.hn
Jamaica	Statistical Institute of Jamaica	statinja.gov.jm
Mexico	Instituto Nacional de Estadística, Geografía e Informatica (INEGI)	inegi.org.mx
Nicaragua	Instituto Nacional de Información de Desarrollo (INIDE)	inide.gob.ni
Panama	Instituto Nacional de Estadística y Censo – Panamá	inec.gob.pa
Paraguay	Instituto Nacional de Estadística	ine.gov.py
Peru	Instituto Nacional de Estadística e Informática	inei.gob.pe
Saint Lucia	The Central Statistical Office of Saint Lucia (CSO)	stats.gov.lc
Saint Kitts and Nevis	Department of Statistics, MInistry of Sustainable Development	stats.gov.kn
Sint Maarten	Central Bureau of Statistics	stat.gov.sx
St. Vincent and the Grenadines	The Statistical Office of St. Vincent and the Grenadines	stats.gov.vc
Suriname	Algemeen Bureau voor de Statistiek (ABS)	statistics-suriname.org
Trinidad and Tobago	Central Statistical Office	cso.gov.tt
Uruguay	Instituto Nacional de Estadística	ine.gub.uy
United States	United States Census Bureau	census.gov
United States	Bureau of Labor Statistics (BLS)	bls.gov
United States	National Center for Education Statistics (NCES)	nces.ed.gov
United States	Energy Information Administration (EIA)	eia.gov
United States	National Agricultural Statistics Service (NASS)	nass.usda.gov
United States	Bureau of Justice Statistics (BJS)	bjs.ojp.gov
United States	Bureau of Economic Analysis (BEA)	bea.gov
United States	National Center for Health Statistics (NCHS)	cdc.gov/nchs
Venezuela	Statistics National Institute (Venezuela) (INE)	ine.gov.ve

=== Asia ===
Country	Organisation	Website
Afghanistan	Central Statistics Organization	nsia.gov.af
Bahrain	Information & eGovernment Authority - Bahrain Open Data Portal	data.gov.bh
Bangladesh	Bangladesh Bureau of Statistics	bbs.gov.bd
Bhutan	National Statistics Bureau	nsb.gov.bt
Brunei	Department of Economic Planning and Statistics	deps.gov.bn
Cambodia	National Institute of Statistics of Cambodia	nis.gov.kh
China	National Bureau of Statistics of China	stats.gov.cn
East Timor	Instituto Nacional de Estatística de Timor-Leste	inetl-ip.gov.tl
Hong Kong	Census and Statistics Department	censtatd.gov.hk
India	National Statistical Office	mospi.gov.in
Indonesia	Badan Pusat Statistik	bps.go.id
Iraq	Central Organization of Statistics & Information Technology (COSIT)	cosit.gov.iq
Iran	Statistical Centre of Iran	amar.org.ir
Israel	Israel Central Bureau of Statistics	cbs.gov.il
Japan	Statistics Bureau of Japan	stat.go.jp
Jordan	The Department of Statistics of the Hashemite Kingdom of Jordan	dos.gov.jo
Kazakhstan	Bureau of National statistics, Agency for Strategic Planning and Reforms of the Republic of Kazakhstan	stat.gov.kz
Kuwait	Kuwait Central Statistical Bureau (Kuwait)	csb.gov.kw
Kyrgyzstan	National Statistical Committee of Kyrgyz Republic	stat.kg
Laos	Lao Statistics Bureau	lsb.gov.la
Lebanon	Central Administration of Statistics (CAS)	cas.gov.lb
Macau	Statistics and Census Service (Macau) (DSEC)	dsec.gov.mo
Malaysia	Department of Statistics (Malaysia)	dosm.gov.my
Maldives	Maldives Bureau of Statistics	statisticsmaldives.gov.mv
Mongolia	National Statists Office of Mongolia	nso.mn
Myanmar	Myanmar Statistical Information Service	mmsis.gov.mm
Nepal	National Statistics Office	nsonepal.gov.np
North Korea	Central Bureau of Statistics	
Oman	National Centre for Statistics & Information	data.gov.om
Palestinian Authority	Palestinian Central Bureau of Statistics	pcbs.gov.ps
Pakistan	Pakistan Bureau of Statistics	pbs.gov.pk
Philippines	Philippine Statistics Authority	psa.gov.ph
Qatar	Planning and Statistics Authority	psa.gov.qa
Saudi Arabia	General Authority for Statistics (Saudi Arabia)	stats.gov.sa/en/
Singapore	Department of Statistics (Singapore)	www.singstat.gov.sg
South Korea	Ministry of Data and Statistics	kostat.go.kr
Sri Lanka	Department of Census and Statistics	
Syria	Syrian Planning and Statistics Commission	psc.gov.sy
Taiwan	Directorate General of Budget, Accounting and Statistics	stat.gov.tw
Tajikistan	Agency on Statistics	stat.tj
Thailand	National Statistical Office (Thailand) (NSO)	nso.go.th
Turkmenistan	State Committee of Turkmenistan on Statistics	stat.gov.tm
United Arab Emirates	Federal Competitiveness and Statistics Centre	fcsc.gov.ae
Uzbekistan	State Committee of the Republic of Uzbekistan on Statistics	stat.uz
Vietnam	National Statistics Office (Vietnam) (NSO)	nso.gov.vn
Yemen	Central statistical organization (CSO)	cso-yemen.org

=== Europe ===
(Institutions from countries marked with * are members of Eurostat's European Statistical System (ESS).)

Country	English language name (Native language abbreviation)	Website
Albania	Institute of Statistics (INSTAT)	instat.gov.al
Andorra	Department of Statistics (DS)	estadistica.ad
Armenia	Statistical Committee of Armenia	armstat.am
Austria *	Statistics Austria	statistik.at
Azerbaijan	State Statistics Committee of the Azerbaijan Republic	stat.gov.az
Belarus	National Statistical Committee of the Republic of Belarus (BELSTAT)	belstat.gov.by/en
Belgium *	Statistics Belgium	statbel.fgov.be
Bosnia and Herzegovina	Agency for Statistics of Bosnia and Herzegovina (BHAS)	bhas.ba
Bulgaria *	National Statistical Institute (NSI)	nsi.bg/en
Croatia *	Croatian Bureau of Statistics (DZS)	dzs.hr
Cyprus *	Statistical Service of Cyprus (CYSTAT)	cystat.gov.cy
Czech Republic *	Czech Statistical Office (ČSÚ)	csu.gov.cz
Denmark *	Statistics Denmark	dst.dk
Estonia *	Statistics Estonia	stat.ee
Faroe Islands	Statistics Faroe Islands	hagstova.fo
Finland *	Statistics Finland	stat.fi
France *	National Institute of Statistics and Economic Studies (INSEE)	insee.fr
Georgia	National Statistics Office of Georgia (GeoStat)	geostat.ge
Germany *	Federal Statistical Office of Germany (Destatis)	destatis.de
Greece *	Hellenic Statistical Authority (EL.STAT.)	statistics.gr
Greenland	Statistics Greenland	stat.gl
Hungary *	Hungarian Central Statistical Office (KSH)	portal.ksh.hu
Iceland *	Statistics Iceland	statice.is
Ireland *	Central Statistics Office (CSO)	cso.ie
Italy *	National Institute of Statistics (ISTAT)	istat.it
Kosovo	Kosovo Agency of Statistics (ASK)	ask.rks-gov.net
Latvia *	Central Statistical Bureau of Latvia (CSP)	stat.gov.lv
Liechtenstein *	Office of Statistics (AS)	as.llv.li
Lithuania *	State Data Agency (LSD)	vda.lrv.lt
Luxembourg *	Central Service for Statistics and Economic Studies (STATEC)	statistiques.public.lu
Malta *	National Statistics Office (NSO)	nso.gov.mt
Moldova	National Bureau of Statistics of the Republic of Moldova (BNS)	statistica.md
Monaco	Monaco Statistics (IMSEE)	monacostatistics.mc
Montenegro	Statistical Office of Montenegro (MONSTAT)	monstat.org
Netherlands *	Statistics Netherlands (CBS)	cbs.nl
North Macedonia	State Statistical Office (DZS)	stat.gov.mk
Norway *	Statistics Norway (SSB)	ssb.no
Poland *	Statistics Poland (GUS)	stat.gov.pl
Portugal *	Statistics Portugal (INE)	ine.pt
Romania *	National Institute of Statistics (INS)	insse.ro
Russia	Federal State Statistics Service (Rosstat)	gks.ru
San Marino	Ufficio Informatica, Tecnologia, Dati e Statistica	statistica.sm
Serbia	Statistical Office of the Republic of Serbia (RZS)	stat.gov.rs
Slovakia *	Statistical Office of the Slovak Republic (SUSR)	susr.sk
Slovenia *	Statistical Office of the Republic of Slovenia (SURS)	stat.si
Spain *	National Statistics Institute (INE)	ine.es
Sweden *	Statistics Sweden (SCB)	scb.se
Switzerland *	Federal Statistical Office (FSO)	bfs.admin.ch
Turkey	Turkish Statistical Institute (TUIK)	turkstat.gov.tr
Ukraine	State Statistics Service of Ukraine	stat.gov.ua
United Kingdom *	Office for National Statistics (ONS)	ons.gov.uk

=== Oceania ===
Country	Organisation	Website
Australia	Australian Bureau of Statistics (ABS)	abs.gov.au
Cook Islands	Cook Islands Statistics Office (CISO)	mfem.gov.ck
Fiji	Fiji Islands Bureau of Statistics	statsfiji.gov.fj
Kiribati	Kiribati Statistics Office	nso.gov.ki
Marshall Islands	Economic Policy, Planning and Statistical Office (EPPSO)	rmieppso.org
Federated States of Micronesia	FSM Department of Resource and Development, Division of Statistics	stats.gov.fm
Nauru	Nauru Bureau of Statistics	spc.int/prism/nauru
New Zealand	Statistics New Zealand	stats.govt.nz
Niue	Niue Statistics	spc.int/prism/niue
Palau	Office of Planning and Statistics (OPS)	palaugov.pw/budgetandplanning
Papua New Guinea	National Statistical Office of Papua New Guinea	nso.gov.pg
Samoa	Statistical Services Division	sbs.gov.ws
Solomon Islands	Solomon Islands Statistics	statistics.gov.sb/
Tonga	Government of Tonga-Statistics Department	spc.int/to/
Tuvalu	Central Statistics Division (CSD)	spc.int/prism/tuvalu
Vanuatu	Vanuatu National Statistics Office (VNSO)	vnso.gov.vu

== Autonomous statistical services at sub-national level ==
Some countries are politically organised as federations of states or of autonomous regions; also a specific territory might have been given a partial autonomy. Several of these sub-national regional units have set their own quasi-independent statistical department. A list is presented in Sub-national autonomous statistical services

== International statistical services ==
=== United Nations organisations ===
Organisation	Statistics Unit	Statistics Website
United Nations Secretariat
UN Department of Economic and Social Affairs (DESA)	United Nations Statistics Division (UNSD)	unstats
UN Department of Economic and Social Affairs (DESA)	United Nations Population Division (UNPD)	Population Information Network
United Nations specialized agencies and related organisations
Food and Agriculture Organization (FAO)	Statistics division	Statistics
International Atomic Energy Agency (IAEA)		(IAEA)
International Labour Organization (ILO)	Department of Statistics (STAT)	Statistics and databases
International Monetary Fund (IMF)	Statistics Department	Data and Statistics
International Telecommunication Union (ITU)	ICT Data and Statistics (IDS)	ICT Data and Statistics
United Nations Educational, Scientific and Cultural Organization (UNESCO)	UNESCO Institute for Statistics (UIS)	Institut of statistics
United Nations Industrial Development Organization (UNIDO)	Directorate of External Relations and Policy Research (EPR)/Department of Policy Research and Statistics/Statistics Division (EPR/PRS/STA)	Statistical Databases
Universal Postal Union (UPU)		postal statistics
World Bank Group (World Bank)	Development Economics Data Group (DECDG)	Data
World Health Organization (WHO)	Health Statistics and Information Systems (HSI)	Data
World Tourism Organization (UNWTO)	Statistics and Tourism Satellite Account Programme	Statistics
World Trade Organization (WTO)	Economic Research and Statistics Division	Statistics
United Nations funds and programmes
Office of the United Nations High Commissioner for Refugees (HCR)	Field Information and Coordination Support section	Statistics
United Nations Children's Fund (UNICEF)		statistics and monitoring
United Nations Conference on Trade and Development (UNCTAD)	Development Statistics and Information Branch	Statistics
United Nations Development Programme (UNDP)		Research & Publications
United Nations Environment Programme (UNEP)		(UNEP)
United Nations Human Settlements Programme (UN-HABITAT)	Monitoring and Research division	Data and publications
United Nations Office on Drugs and Crime (UNODC)		Statistics
United Nations Population Fund (UNFPA)		unfpa.org
United Nations Regional Commissions
United Nations Economic Commission for Africa (ECA)	African Centre for Statistics	ACS
United Nations Economic Commission for Europe (ECE)	Statistical Division	Statistics
United Nations Economic Commission for Latin America and the Caribbean (ECLAC)	Statistics division	Data and statistics
United Nations Economic and Social Commission for Asia and the Pacific (ESCAP)	Statistics Division	Statistics
United Nations Economic and Social Commission for Western Asia (ESCWA)	Statistics Division	Statistics Division
Statistical training institutions in United Nations System
Statistical Institute for Asia and the Pacific (SIAP)		(SIAP)

=== Intergovernmental Development and Central Banks ===
Organisation	Statistics Unit	Statistics Website
Intergovernmental Development Banks
African Development Bank (AfDB)	Statistics Department	Statistics
Asian Development Bank (ADB)	Economics and Research Department (ERD)	Data
Caribbean Development Bank (CDB)	Economics Department	Economics statistics
European Bank for Reconstruction and Development (EBRD)	Office of the Chief Economist	Economic data
Inter-American Development Bank (IADB)	Department of Research and Chief Economist	Statistics and Databases
Islamic Development Bank (IsDB)	Data Resource and Statistics Department	
Intergovernmental Central Banks
Bank for International Settlements (BIS)	Statistics and Research Support	Statistics
Bank of Central African States (BEAC)		Statistiques
Central Bank of West African States (BCEAO)	Direction de la Recherche et de la Statistique	Statistiques
Eastern Caribbean Central Bank (ECCB)	Statistics Department	Statistics
European Central Bank (ECB)	Statistics (Directorate general)	Statistics

=== Regional intergovernmental organisations ===
Organisation	Statistics Unit	Statistics Website
African Union (AU)	Statistics Division	Statistics
The Economic and Statistical Observatory of Sub-Saharan Africa (AFRISTAT)	General Directorate	afristat.org
Andean Community of Nations (CAN)		Estadisticas
Arab Maghreb Union (AMU)		Statistics
Asia-Pacific Economic Cooperation (APEC)	Policy Support Unit	StatsAPEC
Association of Southeast Asian Nations (ASEAN)	Statistics Division	ASEANstats
Caribbean Community (CARICOM)	Statistics Sub-programme	Caricomstats
Central American Integration System (SICA)		Regional statistics
Common Market for Eastern and Southern Africa (COMESA)	Statistical program	Comstat
Community of Sahel-Saharan States (CEN-SAD)		
Commonwealth of Independent States (CIS)	Interstate Statistical Committee (CISSTAT)	Cisstat
Gulf Cooperation Council (GCC)		Statistics
East African Community (EAC)		Statistics
Economic Community of Central African States (ECCAS)		
Economic Community of West African States (ECOWAS)	Research and Statistics Directorate	Ecostat
European Free Trade Association (EFTA)	EFTA Statistical Office	Statistics
European Union (EU)	Eurostat	Eurostat
Intergovernmental Authority on Development (IGAD)		
League of Arab states (LAS)		Statistical Reports
Mercosur (MERCOSUR)	Macroeconomic Monitoring Group (GMM)	Statistics
Organisation for Economic Co-operation and Development (OECD)	Statistics and Data Directorate	Statistics and Data Directorate
Organisation of Eastern Caribbean States (OECS)		Statistics and data
Organisation of Islamic Cooperation (OIC)	see SESRIC below	Department statistics
Secretariat of the Pacific Community (SPC)	Statistics for Development Division	Statistics for Development
South Asian Association for Regional Cooperation (SAARC)		SAARCSTAT
Southern African Development Community (SADC)	Statistics	Statistics
West African Economic and Monetary Union (WAEMU)	Direction des Études Statistiques et Économiques	

=== Other organisations ===
Organisation	Statistics Unit	Statistics Website
Regional training and research in statistics organisations
Arab Institute for Training and Research in Statistics (AITRS)	General Directorate	AITRS
Statistical, Economic and Social Research and Training Centre for Islamic Countries (SESRIC)	Statistics and Information Department	Department statistics
Partnership in statistics
Partnership in Statistics for Development in the 21st Century (PARIS21)	PARIS21 Secretariat	PARIS21

== See also ==
- Official statistics
- Statistics
- List of statistical topics
- List of academic statistical associations
- National agencies responsible for GDP measurement
