= National agencies responsible for GDP measurement =

Within each country GDP is normally measured by a national government statistical agency, as private sector organizations normally do not have access to the information required (especially information on expenditure and production by governments).

- Algeria: Office of National Statistics
- Argentina: National Institute of Statistics and Census of Argentina
- Albania: Institute of Statistics (Instituti nderkombetare i statistikave).
- Andorra: Departament d' Estadística del Principat d' Andorra
- Armenia: Statistical Committee of Armenia
- Australia: Australian Bureau of Statistics (ABS), Reserve Bank of Australia (RBA)
- Austria: Statistik Austria
- Bangladesh: Bangladesh Bureau of Statistics
- Benin: Institut National de la Statistique Benin (INSAE)
- Belgium: Statistics Belgium.
- Bosnia and Herzegovina: Federal Office of Statistics (FBIH) and Institute of Statistics (RS)
- Botswana: Statistics Botswana
- Brazil: Instituto Brasileiro de Geografia e Estatística (IBGE).
- Bulgaria: National Statistical Institute (NSI; Национален статистически институт).
- Cameroon: National Institute of Statistics (INS)
- Chile: Banco Central de Chile
- China, People's Republic of: National Bureau of Statistics of China (中华人民共和国国家统计局).
- China, Republic of: Directorate-General of Budget, Accounting and Statistics (行政院主計處).
- Colombia: Departamento Administrativo Nacional de Estadistica (DANE).
- Costa Rica: Banco Central de Costa Rica (BCCR).
- Croatia: Croatian Bureau of Statistics (CROSTAT).
- Canada: Statistics Canada (StatCan).
- Cyprus: Statistical Service (Στατιστική Υπηρεσία της Κυπριακής Δημοκρατίας; CYSTAT).
- Czech Republic: Czech Statistical Office (Český statistický úřad, ČSÚ).
- Denmark: Danmarks Statistik.
- Dominican Republic: Central Bank of the Dominican Republic
- Egypt: CAPMAS
- Eritriea: National Statistics Office
- Estonia: Statistikaamet
- Ethiopia: Central Statistical Agency (CSA)
- European Union: Eurostat
- Finland: Tilastokeskus
- France: Institut National de la Statistique et des Etudes Economiques (INSEE)
- Germany: Statistisches Bundesamt
- Greece: Hellenic Statistical Authority - ELSTAT (Ελληνική Στατιστική Αρχή, ΕΛΣΤΑΤ)
- Hong Kong: Census and Statistics Department (政府統計處)
- Hungary: Hungarian Central Statistical Office
- Iceland: Statistics Iceland
- India: Ministry of Statistics and Programme Implementation
- Indonesia: Badan Pusat Statistik (BPS)
- Isle of Man: Isle of Man Government Economic Affairs
- Ireland, Republic of: Central Statistics Office Ireland (Príomhoifig Staidrimh na hÉireann)
- Israel: Israel Central Bureau of Statistics
- Italy: Istituto Nazionale di Statistica (ISTAT)
- Lesotho: Bureau of Statistics
- Japan: Cabinet Office (CO, 内閣府)
- Jamaica: Statistical Institute of Jamaica (STATIN)
- Korea (South): Bank of Korea (BOK, 한국은행)
- Kosovo: Enti i Statistikës së Kosovës (ESK)
- Kuwait: [الادارة المركزية للإحصاء] (ESK) Kuwait Central Statistical Bureau https://www.csb.gov.kw
- Latvia: Centrālā statistikas pārvalde
- Lithuania: Lietuvos Statistikos Departamentas (Department of Statistics, Lithuania)
- Luxembourg: Service central de la statistique et des études économiques (Luxembourg Statistics)
- Macedonia, Republic of: Zavod za Statistika na Makedonija
- Malaysia: Jabatan Perangkaan Malaysia (Department of Statistics, Malaysia)
- Macau: Direcção dos Serviços de Estatística e Censos (DSEC)
- Mexico: Instituto Nacional de Estadística, Geografía e Informática (INEGI)
- Moldova: Biroul Naţional de Statistică (BNS)]
- Namibia: Namibia Statistics Agency (NSA)
- The Netherlands: Centraal Bureau voor de Statistiek (Statistics Netherlands)
- New Zealand: Statistics New Zealand (Tatauranga Aotearoa)
- Nigeria: National Bureau of Statistics
- Norway: Statistisk Sentralbyrå
- Pakistan: Federal Bureau of Statistics
- Palestinian National Authority: Palestinian Central Bureau of Statistics (PCBS)
- Peru: Instituto Nacional de Estadística e Informática (INEI)
- Philippines: Philippine National Statistical Coordination Board
- Poland: Central Statistical Office (Główny Urząd Statystyczny; GUS)
- Portugal: Instituto Nacional de Estatística (National Statistics Office)
- Qatar: Qatar Statistics Authority; General Secretariat for Development Planning
- Romania: Institutul National de Statistica
- Russia: Federal Service of State Statistics (Rosstat)
- Saudi Arabia: Central Department of Statistics (وزارة الاقتصاد والتخطيط)
- Serbia: Statistical Office of the Republic of Serbia
- Singapore: Singapore Department of Statistics
- Slovakia: Štatistický úrad SR
- Slovenia: Statistični urad Republike Slovenije (SURS)
- South Africa: Statistics South Africa (STATSSA)
- Spain: Instituto Nacional de Estadística (INE)
- Sweden: Statistics Sweden (SCB)
- Switzerland: Swiss Statistics - Federal Statistical Office
- Thailand The National Economic and Social Development Board (NESDB)
- Turkey: Türkiye İstatistik Kurumu (TUIK)
- Ukraine: State Statistics Committee of Ukraine (Derzhkomstat; SSC)
- United Kingdom: UK Statistics Authority, Office for National Statistics
- United States: Bureau of Economic Analysis (BEA)
- Uruguay: Instituto Nacional de Estadística (INE)
- Venezuela: Instituto Nacional de Estadística (INE)
- Vietnam: General Statistics Office (GSO, Tổng cục Thống kê)

== See also ==
- United Nations System of National Accounts
- List of national and international statistical services
