= Institut National de la Statistique =

Institut national de la statistique may refer to:

- Institut national de la statistique et de l'analyse économique (INSAE), in Benin
- Institut national de la statistique et de la démographie (INSD), in Burkina Faso
- Institut national de la statistique (INS), or National Institute of Statistics (Cameroon), in Cameroon
- Institut national de la statistique, des études économiques et démographiques (INSEED), in Chad
- Institut national de la statistique (Côte d'Ivoire) (INS), in Côte d'Ivoire
- Institut national de la statistique et des études économiques^{(fr)} (INSEE), in France
- Institut national de la statistique (Mali) (INSTAT), in Mali
- Institut national de la statistique (Madagascar) (INSTAT), in Madagascar
- Institut national de la statistique (INS), in Niger
- Institut national de la statistique, or Instituto Nacional de Estadística (Spain) (INE), in Spain
- Institut national de la statistique (INS), in Tunisia

== See also ==
- List of national and international statistical services
- INS (disambiguation)
