= Committee for the Coordination of Statistical Activities =

The Committee for the Coordination of Statistical Activities (CCSA) is a United Nations inter-agency forum. It is composed of international and supranational organisations whose mandate includes the provision of statistics. The CCSA promotes inter-agency coordination and cooperation on statistical programmes and consistency in statistical practices and development.

== Activities ==
As a forum of committed members, the CCSA's purpose is to foster good practices in the statistical activities of international and supranational organisations, in accordance with the principles governing international statistical activities. Its members contribute actively to the development of a coordinated global statistical system producing and disseminating high-quality statistics.

The CCSA Secretariat and CCSA website are hosted by the United Nations Statistics Division (UNSD). The Committee meets twice a year and is represented by the top level of the statistical services of its member organisations.

== Membership ==
As of 2024 members of the CCSA are:

- African Development Bank (AfDB)
- Arab Institute for Training and Research in Statistics (AITRS)
- Asian Development Bank (ADB)
- Bank for International Settlements (BIS)
- Caribbean Community (CARICOM)
- European Central Bank (ECB)
- Food and Agriculture Organization of the United Nations (FAO)
- Inter-American Development Bank (IDB)
- International Atomic Energy Agency (IAEA)
- International Civil Aviation Organization (ICAO)
- International Labour Organization (ILO)
- International Monetary Fund (IMF)
- International Telecommunication Union (ITU)
- Interstate Statistical Committee of the Commonwealth of Independent States (CISSTAT)
- Office of the United Nations High Commissioner for Human Rights (OHCHR)
- Organisation for Economic Co-operation and Development (OECD)
- PARIS21 (P21)
- Statistical Centre for the Cooperation Council for the Arab Countries of the Gulf (GCCSTAT)
- Statistical, Economic and Social Research and Training Centre for Islamic Countries (SESRIC)
- Statistical Office of the European Union (EUROSTAT)
- The Economic and Statistical Observatory of Sub-Saharan Africa (Afristat)
- United Nations Children’s Fund (UNICEF)
- United Nations Conference on Trade and Development (UNCTAD)
- United Nations Development Programme (UNDP)
- United Nations Economic Commission for Africa (UNECA)
- United Nations Economic Commission for Europe (UNECE)
- United Nations Economic Commission for Latin America and the Caribbean (UNECLAC)
- United Nations Economic and Social Commission for Asia and the Pacific (UNESCAP)
- United Nations Economic and Social Commission for Western Asia (UNESCWA)
- United Nations Educational, Scientific and Cultural Organization Institute for Statistics (UNESCO-IS)
- United Nations Entity for Gender Equality and the Empowerment of Women (UN-Women)
- United Nations Environment Programme (UNEP)
- United Nations High Commissioner for Refugees (UNHCR)
- United Nations Human Settlements Programme (UN-Habitat)
- United Nations Industrial Development Organization (UNIDO)
- Office for the Coordination of Humanitarian Affairs of the Secretariat (UNOCHA)
- United Nations Office on Drugs and Crime (UNODC)
- United Nations Population Division (UNPD)
- United Nations Population Fund (UNFPA)
- United Nations Statistics Division (UNSD)
- Universal Postal Union (UPU)
- World Bank
- World Health Organization (WHO)
- World Tourism Organization (UNWTO)
- World Trade Organization (WTO)

== Sessions ==
Year	Session	Venue	Co-chairs/Chair
2003	1st session	New York	Andrew Flatt (UNESCAP)
	2nd session	Geneva (ILO)	Andrew Flatt (UNESCAP)
2004	3rd session	New York	Andrew Flatt (UNESCAP)
	4th session	New York	Andrew Flatt (UNESCAP)
2005	5th session	New York	Sylvester Young (ILO)
	6th session	Rome (FAO)	Sylvester Young (ILO)
2006	7th session	New York	Sylvester Young (ILO)
	8th session	Montreal (UNESCO)	Sylvester Young (ILO)
2007	9th session	New York	Sylvester Young (ILO)
	10th session	Madrid (UNWTO)	Sylvester Young (ILO)
2008	11th session	New York	Paul Cheung (UNSD) and Pieter Everaers (Eurostat)
	12th session	Tunis (AfDB)	Paul Cheung (UNSD) and Pieter Everaers (Eurostat)
2009	13th session	New York	Paul Cheung (UNSD) and Pieter Everaers (Eurostat)
	14th session	Bangkok (UNESCAP)	Paul Cheung (UNSD) and Pieter Everaers (Eurostat)
2010	15th session	New York	Pieter Everaers (Eurostat) and Henri Laurencin (UNCTAD)
	16th session	Vienna (UNIDO/UNODC/IAEA)	Pieter Everaers (Eurostat) and Henri Laurencin (UNCTAD)
2011	17th session	New York	Pieter Everaers (Eurostat) and Henri Laurencin (UNCTAD)
	18th session	Luxembourg (Eurostat)	Pieter Everaers (Eurostat) and Henri Laurencin (UNCTAD)
2012	19th session	New York	Werner Bier (ECB) and Henri Laurencin (UNCTAD)
	20th session	Frankfurt (ECB)	Werner Bier (ECB) and Henri Laurencin (UNCTAD)
2013	21st session	New York	Werner Bier (ECB) and Henri Laurencin (UNCTAD)
	22nd session	Ankara (SESRIC)	Werner Bier (ECB) and Henri Laurencin (UNCTAD)
2014	23rd session	New York	Werner Bier (ECB) and Pietro Gennari (FAO)
	24th session	Rome (FAO)	Werner Bier (ECB) and Pietro Gennari (FAO)
2015	25th session	New York	Werner Bier (ECB) and Pietro Gennari (FAO)
	26th session	Bangkok (UNESCAP)	Werner Bier (ECB) and Pietro Gennari (FAO)

== See also ==
- List of national and international statistical services
