= INN =

INN may stand for:

== Medicine ==
- International nonproprietary name, in pharmaceutics

== News ==
- Independent News Network
- Independent Network News (disambiguation)
- Institute for Nonprofit News, formerly known as Investigative News Network
- InterNetNews news server
- Israel National News, English name for Israeli media network Arutz Sheva

== Other ==
- Illegal, Non-reported and Non-regulated Fishing, usually known as IUU (Illegal, unreported and unregulated fishing)
- ImagiNation Network
- The IATA airport code for Innsbruck Kranebitten Airport
- Interfaith Nutrition Network

== See also ==
- Inn, an establishment for travelers to lodge, eat, and rest
- Inn (disambiguation)
