= Night at the Inn =

Night at the Inn or variation, may refer to:

== Literature ==
- "Night at the Inn" (story), a 1960 short story by Georgette Heyer; see List of works by Georgette Heyer
- "A Night at Two Inns" (story), a 1985 short story by Phyllis Ann Karr; appearing in the Sword and Sorceress series
- "One Night at the Inn" (story), a short story by Millea Kenin; see Sword and Sorceress series

== Other uses ==
- "A Night at the Inn", an episode of Amphibia

== See also ==
- Night Inn, a 1947 Chinese film
- "The Night Inn" (song), a 2016 song by Radwimps off the album Your Name (album)
- Inn (disambiguation)
- Night (disambiguation)
