= Sub-national autonomous statistical services =

Sub-national statistical services when autonomous are part of the overall statistical architecture of a country along with a central statistical organisation existing in nearly every country (see List of national and international statistical services), and also various sectoral statistical services established in Ministerial departments or other government agencies. This is particularly true in the case of most Federation of states as shown in the table below. Those of these sub-national statistical services established in non-independent territories (from UK, Netherlands, France, etc.) generally act as a central statistical organisation for the territory. The mandate of these autonomous services varies from country to country; their statistical production intends to respond mainly to local needs for statistics, complementary to the production of national statistical data.

Community	Institution	Website
Australia
Norfolk Island		
Queensland	Queensland Government Statistician's Office	qgso.qld.gov.au
Brazil
Bahia	SEI – Superintendência de Estudos Econômicos e Sociais da Bahia	www.sei.ba.gov.br/
Minas Gerais	Diretoria de Estatística e Informações (Direi)	diretoria-de-estatistica-e-informacoes
Espírito Santo	IJSN - Instituto Jones dos Santos Neves	www.ijsn.es.gov.br
Pernambuco	Agência Estadual de Planejamento e Pesquisas de Pernambuco - Condepe/Fidem	www.condepefidem.pe.gov.br
Rio de Janeiro	Centro de Estatísticas, Estudos e Pesquisas - CEEP	ceep
Rio Grande do Sul	Fundação de Economia e Estatística (FEE)	fee.rs.gov.br/
Santa Catarina	Secretaria de Estado do Planejamento (SPG)	www.spg.sc.gov.br
São Paulo	Fundação Sistema Estadual de Análise de Dados – (Seade)	seade.sp.gov.br
Canada
Alberta	Office of Statistics and Information (OSI)	osi.alberta.ca
British Columbia	BC Stats	bcstats.gov.bc.ca
Manitoba	Manitoba Bureau of Statistics	gov.mb.ca/mbs/
New Brunswick	Direction des relations fédérales-provinciales, finances et statistiques	www2.gnb.ca
Newfoundland and Labrador	Newfoundland & Labrador Statistics Agency	stats.gov.nl.ca
Nova Scotia	Finance and Treasury Board: Economics and Statistics Division	novascotia.ca/finance/statistics/
Ontario	Finance, Office of Economic Policy: Statistics Integration Branch	Office of Economic Policy
Prince Edward Island	Economics, Statistics and Federal Fiscal Relations Division: Statistics bureau	gov.pe.ca/pt/esaffr-info/
Québec	Institut de la statistique du Québec	stat.gouv.qc.ca
Saskatchewan	Saskatchewan Bureau of Statistics	bureau of statistics
Northwest Territories	NWT Bureau of Statistics	statsnwt.ca
Nunavut	Nunavut Bureau of Statistics	stats.gov.nu.ca
Yukon	Yukon Bureau of Statistics	yukon.ca/bureau-of-statistics
China
Hong Kong	Census and Statistics Department (C&SD)	censtatd.gov.hk
Macao	Statistics and Census Service (DSEC)	dsec.gov.mo
Denmark
Faroe Islands	Hagstova Føroya; Statistics Faroe Islands	hagstova.fo
Greenland	Kalaallit Nunaanni Naatsorsueqqissaartarfik (GS); Statistics Greenland (SG)	stat.gl
Finland
Åland	Statistics and Research Åland (ÅSUB)	asub.ax
France: Overseas departments and territories of France
New Caledonia	Institut de la statistique et des études économiques Nouvelle Calédonie (ISEE)	isee.nc
Polynésie française	Institut de la statistique de la Polynésie française (ISFP)	ispf.pf
France Wallis-et-Futuna	Service Territorial de la Statistique & des Études Économiques (STSEE)	statistique.wf
Germany
Baden-Württemberg	Statistisches Landesamt Baden-Württemberg	statistik-bw.de
Bavaria	Bayerisches Landesamt für Statistik und Datenverarbeitung	statistik.bayern.de
Berlin Brandenburg	Amt für Statistik Berlin-Brandenburg	statistik-berlin-brandenburg.de
Bremen	Statistisches Landesamt Bremen	statistik.bremen.de
Hamburg Schleswig-Holstein	Statistisches Amt für Hamburg und Schleswig-Holstein	statistik-nord.de
Hesse	Hessisches Statistisches Landesamt	statistik-hessen.de
Mecklenburg-Vorpommern	Statistisches Amt Mecklenburg-Vorpommern	statistik-mv.de
Lower Saxony	Landesamt für Statistik Niedersachsen (LSN)	statistik.niedersachsen.de
North Rhine-Westphalia	Information und Technik Nordrhein-Westfalen, Geschäftsbereich Statistik	it.nrw.de
Rhineland-Palatinate	Statistisches Landesamt Rheinland-Pfalz	statistik.rlp.de
Saarland	Statistisches Amt Saarland	statistik.saarland.de
Saxony	Statistisches Landesamt des Freistaates Sachsen	statistik.sachsen.de
Saxony-Anhalt	Statistisches Landesamt Sachsen-Anhalt	statistik.sachsen-anhalt.de
Thuringia	Thüringer Landesamt für Statistik	statistik.thueringen.de
India
States
Andhra Pradesh	Directorate of Economics and Statistics	Departments
Arunachal Pradesh	Directorate of Economics and Statistics	arunachalpradesh.nic.in/economics
Assam	Directorate of Economics and Statistics	EcoStatis
West Bengal	Bureau of Applied Economics and Statistics	BAESD
Bihar	Directorate of Statistics and Evaluation	
Chhattisgarh	Directorate of Economics and Statistics	
Goa	Statistics Division, Department of Planning, Statistics and Evaluation	goadpse.gov.in
Gujarat	Directorate of Economics and Statistics	eco_and_stat
Haryana	Department of Economic and Statistical Analysis	esaharyana.gov.in
Himachal Pradesh	Department of Economics and Statistics	himachal.nic.in/economics/
Jammu and Kashmir	Economics and Statistics Department	
Jharkhand	Directorate of Statistics and Evaluation	jharkhand.nic.in/dept_stat
Karnataka	Directorate of Economics and Statistics	des.kar.nic.in/indexie
Kerala	Economics and Statistics Department	ecostatkerala.org
Madhya Pradesh	Directorate of Economics and Statistics	mp.gov.in/des/
Maharashtra	Directorate of Economics and Statistics	mahades.maharashtra.gov.in
Manipur	Directorate of Economics and Statistics	desmani.nic.in
Meghalaya	Directorate of Economics and Statistics	megplanning.gov.in/eco_statistics
Mizoram	Department of Economics and Statistics	desmizo.nic.in
Nagaland	Department of Economics and Statistics	ecostatng.nic.in
Orissa	Directorate of Economics and Statistics	desorissa/desmain
Punjab	Economic Adviser to Government, Punjab	government/economic_adviser
Rajasthan	Directorate of Economics and Statistics	statistics.rajasthan.gov.in
Sikkim	Department of Economics and Statistics Monitoring and Evaluation (DESME)	southsikkim.nic.in/desme
Tamil Nadu	Department of Economics and Statistics	tn.gov.in/deptst/
Tripura	Department of Economics and Statistics	destripura.nic.in
Uttarakhand	Directorate of Economics and Statistics	gov.ua.nic.in/des/
Uttar Pradesh	Economics and Statistics Division, State Planning Institute	updes.up.nic.in
Union Territories
Andaman and Nicobar Islands	Directorate of Economics and Statistics	ecostat
Chandigarh	Special Secretary - Director Planning & Statistic	
Dadra and Nagar Haveli	Department of Planning and Statistics	
Daman and Diu	Department of Planning and Statistics	planning-statistics
Lakshadweep	Directorate of Planning and Statistics	
National Capital Territory of Delhi	Directorate of Economics & Statistics and Office of Chief Registrar(Births & Deaths)	des/home
Puducherry	Directorate of Economics and Statistics	dept_econstat
Italy
Sardinia	Osservatorio Economico	sardegnastatistiche.it
Sicily	Servizio di Statistica della Regione Siciliana	regione.sicilia.it/bilancio/statistica/
Aosta Valley	Chef de l'observatoire économique et social	regione.vda.it
Netherlands: Caribbean Netherlands
Aruba	Central Bureau of Statistics (CBS)	cbs.aw
Bonaire	Central Bureau of Statistics	cbs.an
Curaçao	Centraal Bureau voor de Statistiek (CBS)	cbs.an
Saba	Central Bureau of Statistics	cbs.an
Sint Eustatius	Central Bureau of Statistics	cbs.an
Sint Maarten	Department of Statistics	sintmaartengov.org
New Zealand
Tokelau	Tokelau Statistics Unit	spc.int/prism/country/tk/
Nigeria States of Nigeria
Abia State	Abia State Bureau of Statistics	Abia-State-Bureau-of-Statistics
Akwa Ibom State	Planning, Research & Statistics Directorate	
Anambra State	Anambra State Bureau of Statistics	asbs (coming soon)
Bauchi State	Ministry of Budget and Economic Planning: Statistics	ministry-of-budget-and-economic-planning
Benue State	Ministry of Finance and Economic Planning: Department of Planning, Research and Statistics (DPRS)	ministry-of-finance-and-economic-planning
Cross River State	Cross River State Bureau of Statistics	cross-river-state-bureau-of-statistics
Kaduna State	Kaduna State Bureau of Statistics	kdbs
Kano State	Kano State Bureau of Statistics (KSBS)	ksbs
Lagos State	Lagos bureau of statistics	
Ogun State	Ministry of Information and Strategy: Department of Planning, Research and Statistics	mis/#planning
Ondo State	Ondo State Bureau of Statistics	ondostatistics.org
Oyo State	Oyo State Bureau of Statistics	oyo-state-bureau-of-statistics
Plateau State	Plateau State Bureau of Statistics	psbs.plateaustate
Rivers State	Ministry of Budget and Economic Planning	mda/ministry-of-budget-and-economic-planning
Portugal
Azores	Serviço Regional de Estatística dos Açores SREA	estatística.azores.gov.pt
Madeira	Direcção Regional de Estatística da Madeira DREM	estatistica.gov-madeira.pt
Spain
Andalusia	Instituto de Estadística de Andalucía (IEA)	juntadeandalucia.es/institutodeestadistica/
Aragon	Instituto Aragonés de Estadística	aragon.es/portal/page/portal/IAEST/
Asturias	Sociedad asturiana de estudios económicos e industriales (SADEI)	sadei.es
Balearic Islands	Institut d'Estadística de les Illes Balears (IBESTAT)	ibestat.cat
Canary Islands	Instituto Canario de Estadística (ISTAC)	gobiernodecanarias.org/istac/
Cantabria	Instituto de Estadística de Cantabria	icane.es
Castile-La Mancha	Instituto de Estadística de Castilla-La Mancha	ies.jccm.es
Castile and León	Dirección General de Estadística	jcyl.es
Catalonia	Institut d'Estadistica de Catalunya (IDESCAT)	idescat.es
Ceuta	Consejería de Presidencia. Negociado de Estadística	ceuta.es
Extremadura	Servicio de Análisis y Estadística	estadisticaextremadura.com
Galicia	Instituto Galego de Estatística (IGE)	ige.eu
La Rioja (Spain)	Instituto de Estadística de la Rioja	larioja.org
Madrid	Instituto de Estadística de la Comunidad de Madrid	madrid.org/iestadis/
Melilla	Consejería de Administraciones Públicas. Negociado de Estadística	melilla.es
Region of Murcia	Centro Regional de Estadística de Murcia	carm.es/econet/
Navarre	Instituto de Estadística de Navarra	cfnavarra.es/estadistica/
Basque Country	Instituto Vasco de Estadística (EUSTAT)	eustat.es
Valencian Community	Institut Valenciá d`Estadística (IVE)	ive.es
Switzerland
Aargau	Statistisches Amt des Kantons Aargau	ag.ch/staag/
Appenzell Innerrhoden	Amt für Statistik	ai.ch/vd
Basel-Landschaft	Statistisches Amt des Kantons Basel-Landschaft	statistik.bl.ch
Basel-Stadt	Statistisches Amt des Kantons Basel-Stadt	statistik.bs.ch
Bern	Abteilung Finanzausgleich, Koordinationsstelle Statistik	fin.be.ch
Fribourg	Amt für Statistik des Kantons Freiburg	stat-fr.ch
Geneva	Office cantonal de la statistique (Genève)	ge.ch/ocstat/
Glarus	Staatskanzlei des Kantons Glarus	gl.ch
Graubünden	Amt für Wirtschaft und Tourismus Graubünden	awt.gr.ch
Jura	Service de l'information et de la communication Statistique du Canton du Jura	statistikstellen_kantone/jura.htm
Lucerne	LUSTAT Statistik Luzern	lustat.ch
Neuchâtel	Service de statistique Neuchâtel	ne.ch/stat
Nidwalden	Amt für Wirtschaft und öffentlichen Verkehr des Kantons Nidwalden	nidwalden.ch
Obwalden	Volkswirtschaftsdepartement des Kantons Obwalden, Statistik-Stelle	ow.ch
Schaffhausen	Wirtschaftsamt des Kantons Schaffhausen	statistik.sh.ch
Schwyz	Volkswirtschaftsdepartement des Kantons Schwyz	sz.ch/vwd/
Solothurn	Amt für Finanzen des Kantons Solothurn, Finanzausgleich und Statistik	statistik.so.ch
St. Gallen	Fachstelle für Statistik des Kantons St.Gallen	statistik.sg.ch
Thurgau	Dienststelle für Statistik des Kantons Thurgau	statistik.tg.ch
Ticino	Ufficio di statistica repubblica e cantone Ticino	ustat/ufficio
Uri	Fachstelle für Statistik (Finanzdirektion Uri)	ur.ch
Valais	Statistisches Amt des Kantons Wallis	vs.ch
Vaud	Statistique Vaud	scris.vd.ch
Zug	Amt für Raumplanung, Fachstelle für Statistik	zug.ch/statistik
Zurich	Statistisches Amt des Kantons Zürich	statistik.zh.ch
Tanzania
Zanzibar	Office of Chief Government Statistician	ocsg.go.tz
United Arab Emirates
Dubai	Dubai Statistics Center	dsc.gov.ae
Abu Dhabi	Statistics Center Abu Dhabi (SCAD)	scad.ae
United Kingdom and British overseas territories
Anguilla	Statistics department	gov.ai/statistics/
Bermuda	Department of Statistics	statistics.gov.bm
British Virgin Islands	Central Statistics Office	bvi.gov.vg/statistics bvi.gov.vg
Cayman Islands	Economics and Statistics Office (ESO)	eso.ky
Scotland	Scottish Government Statistics Group	scotland.gov.uk/Topics/Statistics/
Gibraltar	Statistics Office	gibraltar.gov.gi
Guernsey	Research section - Policy and Research Unit	gov.gg
Northern Ireland	Statistics and Research Agency (NISRA)	nisra.gov.uk
Jersey	Statistics Unit	gov.je/ChiefMinister/Statistics/
Isle of Man	Economic Affairs Division	gov.im/treasury/economic/
Montserrat	Statistics Department	gov.ms/pubs/statistics-department/
Wales	Statistical Directorate	wales.gov.uk/topics/statistics/
Saint Helena	Development and Economic Planning Department	sainthelena.gov.sh
Turks and Caicos Islands	TCI Statistical Office (Department of Economic Planning and Statistics)	depstc.org/statofc
British Virgin Islands	Development Planning Unit	dpu.gov.vg
United States of America: Unincorporated territories of the United States
Guam	Bureau of Statistics and Plans	bsp.guam.gov
Northern Mariana Islands	Central Statistics Division	commerce.gov.mp/new/central_statistic/
Puerto Rico	Instituto de Estadísticas	estadisticas.gobierno.pr
American Samoa	Research and Statistics Division	doc.as.gov/statistics/
United States Virgin Islands	United States Eastern Caribbean Center	uvi.edu/sites/uvi/Pages/ECC-Home.aspx

== See also ==
- List of national and international statistical services
- List of statistical offices in Germany
