= Department of Statistics (Bermuda) =

Bermuda Department of Statistics
Agency overview
- Superseding agency: Cabinet Office
- Type: National statistics service
- Headquarters: Hamilton, Bermuda
- Agency executive: Director
- Website: www.gov.bm/department/statistics

The Bermuda Department of Statistics, subject to the Bermuda Statistics Act of 2002 as further amended, reports to the head of Cabinet Office. It was created mainly for the collection, compilation, analysis and publication of statistical information and so facilitate the development of a statistical system for Bermuda which is also a component of the regional statistical systems of CARICOM, together with other member countries of this regional institution.

== Mission ==
In accordance with the provisions of the Statistics Act

1. to collect, compile, collate, analyse, abstract and publish statistical information relating to the commercial, industrial, social, financial, economic, and general activities and conditions of the people of Bermuda;
2. to take any census of population and housing in Bermuda;
3. to collaborate with Ministries, other Government Departments and public authorities in the collection, compilation, collation and publication of statistical information, including statistics derived from the activities of those Ministries, departments or public authorities;
4. to promote the avoidance of duplication in the information collected by Ministries, other Government Departments and public authorities;
5. and generally to promote, organise and develop an integrated scheme of economic and social statistics relating to Bermuda

== Organisation ==
The department is organised in five work divisions:

- Administration Division
- Business Statistics Division
- Social Statistics Division
- Economic Statistics Division
- Census and Survey Research Statistics Division

== History ==
Previous heads of the Department of statistics
Name	width=100 Valerie Robinson James	Qt2 2014

== See also ==
- Sub-national autonomous statistical services
- United Nations Statistics Division
