= INS =

INS or Ins may refer to:

== Places ==
- Ins, Switzerland, a municipality
- Creech Air Force Base (IATA airport code INS)
- Indonesia, ITF and UNDP code INS
- INS Park, an entertainment complex in China

== Biology ==
- Ins, a New World genus of bee flies
- INS, the gene for the insulin precursor

== Arts, entertainment, and media ==
- Indian Newspaper Society
- International News Service, US, 1909–1958

== Enterprises and organizations ==
- International Necronautical Society
- International Network Services Inc.
- International Neuroethics Society
- International Neuropsychological Society
- International Nuclear Services, UK

== Government and politics ==
- Immigration and Naturalization Service, former US agency merged into DHS
- Institut National de la Statistique (disambiguation), statistics agencies in many Francophone countries
- National Institute of Statistics (Romania)

== Naval ==
- Indian Naval Ship
- Israeli Naval Ship

== Technology ==
- <ins>...</ins> HTML block element indicating insertion
- Inertial navigation system
- Insert key marking on a computer keyboard

== Other uses ==
- The abbreviated plural of inches
- International Numbering System for Food Additives, adopted by the Codex Alimentarius Commission

== See also ==
- IN (disambiguation)
