= Central Bureau of Statistics (Syria) =

Syrian government institution in charge of statistics and census data

Institute overview
- Formed: 2005
- Dissolved: May 17, 2025
- Superseding Institute: Syrian Planning and Statistics Commission
- Jurisdiction: Government of Syria
- Headquarters: Damascus, Syria
- Website: cbssyr.sy

The Central Bureau of Statistics (CBS) (Arabic: المكتب المركزي للإحصاء) was the statistical agency responsible for the gathering of "information relating to economic, social and general activities and conditions" in Syria. The office was answerable to the office of the Prime Minister and had its main offices in Damascus. The CBS was established in 2005 and was administered by an administrative council headed by the deputy prime minister for economic affairs. After the Syrian government began reconstructing infrastructure in 2011, the bureau began releasing data from 2011 to 2018.

In 2025, under the Syrian transitional government, the Central Bureau of Statistics was merged into the General Authority for Planning and International Cooperation, which was simultaneously renamed the Syrian Planning and Statistics Commission (Arabic: هيئة التخطيط والإحصاء) by Decree No. 18 of 2025. The merger was effected under Decree No. 27 of 2025 ending the CBS's existence as an independent body.
