= In =

IN, In or in may refer to:

== Arts and media ==
=== Music ===
- In (album), by the Outsiders, 1967
- In Nomine, a title given to any of numerous short pieces of English polyphonic instrumental or vocal music during the 16th and 17th centuries
- I.N (born Yang Jeong-in, 2001), South Korean singer and member of boy band Stray Kids
- "In", a song by Swans from the album The Great Annihilator

=== Other media ===
- "In", an episode of Minder
- Imperishable Night, the eighth official game in the Japanese Touhou series

== Businesses and organizations ==
- Independent Network, a UK-based political association
- Indiana Northeastern Railroad (Association of American Railroads reporting mark)
- Indian Navy, a part of the India military
- Infantry, the branch of a military force that fights on foot
- IN Groupe, the producer of French official documents
- MAT Macedonian Airlines (IATA designator IN)
- Nam Air (IATA designator IN)
- Office of Intelligence and Counterintelligence, sometimes abbreviated IN

== Places ==
- India (country code IN)
- Indiana, US (postal code IN)
- Ingolstadt, Germany (license plate code IN)
- In, Russia, a town in the Jewish Autonomous Oblast

== Science and technology ==
- .in, the internet top-level domain of India
- Inch (in), a unit of length
- Indium, symbol In, a chemical element
- Intelligent Network, a telecommunication network standard
- Intra-nasal (insufflation), a method of administrating some medications and vaccines
- Integrase, a retroviral enzyme
- The "is an element of" operator ∈, denoting that an expression is an element of a set

== Other uses ==
- In (Korean name), a family name and a given name
- Indonesian language (former ISO 639-1 language code; "id" used since November 3, 1989)

== See also ==
- Inn (disambiguation)
- INS (disambiguation)
