= PARIS21 =

Global partnership supporting data and statistics in developing countries

- Partnership in Statistics for Development in the 21st Century
- Type: International Partnership
- Purpose: To promote, influence and facilitate statistical capacity development and the better use of statistics.
- Headquarters: OECD Boulogne
- Location: Boulogne-Billancourt
- Region served: Hauts-de-Seine France
- Official language: English (or French)
- Executive Head: Johannes Jütting
- Deputy Manager: François Fonteneau
- Board of directors: PARIS21 Board, which includes 54 representatives from all the main stakeholders
- Parent organization: OECD Statistics and Data Directorate
- Staff: 26 (2020)
- Website: PARIS21.org

The Partnership in Statistics for Development in the 21st Century, or PARIS21, was established in November 1999 by the United Nations, the European Commission, the Organisation for Economic Co-operation and Development (OECD), the International Monetary Fund, and the World Bank as a response to the UN Economic and Social Council resolution on the goals of the UN International Conference on Financing for Development. PARIS21's main objective is "to achieve national and international development goals and to reduce poverty in low and middle income countries". In pursuit of this, PARIS21 "facilitates statistical capacity development, advocates for the integration of reliable data in decision-making, and coordinates donor support to statistics". The PARIS21 Secretariat is hosted within the Statistics and Data Directorate of the OECD in Boulogne-Billancourt, France.

== History ==
The OECD Development Assistance Committee hosted a meeting of 100 statistical and policy officials from developing countries, international organisations, regional banks and bilateral donors on 18–19 November 1999 to discuss the challenges faced by policymakers due to outdated, insufficient statistics, and the challenges faced by statisticians due to limited resources and low priority status in government. As a result of this meeting, PARIS21 was established as a "global partnership of national, regional and international statisticians, analysts, policy-makers, development professionals and other users of statistics". The primary purpose of PARIS21 is to "promote, influence and facilitate statistical capacity development and the better use of statistics". In function, PARIS21 acts as a "forum and a network" for relevant stakeholders "interested in the production and use of statistics to support economic and social development and to promote better governance". Members of this partnership work to advocate for better statistics production and use in both "policy and technical domains", and push for more and better funding for data and statistics in development.

== Structure ==
The PARIS21 Secretariat, led by the PARIS21 Secretariat Executive Head, is responsible for coordinating Partnership activities and "implementing the day-to-day work programme of PARIS21 as approved by the Board and the Executive Committee". The Board consists of stakeholder representatives from developing countries, bilateral donors and international organisations. The Board meets once a year to review the PARIS21 Programme of Work and to facilitate dialogue on general issues relating to the development and use of statistics. Outside of Board meetings, Secretariat activities are guided and monitored by a small Executive Committee consisting of members selected by the Board. This committee has the ability to organise task teams and ad hoc projects in the Board's absence.

PARIS21's governance agreements were most recently revised in December 2017. Only occurring twice since PARIS21's inception (a revision was also made in November 2006), revisions to PARIS21's governance agreements are made to "reflect the evolution" of PARIS21's role based on feedback from the Board.

== Areas of work ==
=== National Strategies for the Development of Statistics (NSDS) ===
PARIS21's work involves assisting low- and middle-income countries to design, implement, and evaluate National Strategies for the Development of Statistics (NSDS). NSDS provide an overall strategic vision of the development of a country's national statistical system (NSS) in line with the data priorities of national, regional and international development policies. NSDS serves as a comprehensive framework for the coordination of all data ecosystem stakeholders as well as for international and bilateral assistance. It addresses issues related to the data production, dissemination, access and use, in addition to modernisation of the NSS.

=== Advocacy ===
As a partnership, PARIS21's work involves connecting producers and users of statistics. It advocates for support to statistics at the international, regional and national levels. It produces a yearly Partner Report on Support to Statistics (PRESS), which documents the global status of technical and financial support to statistical development. At the country level, PARIS21 collaborates with individual national statistical systems to produce a Country Report on Support to Statistics (CRESS) examining the state of funding for statistics in the national statistical system. Additionally, PARIS21 organises in-country training sessions and workshops for national statistical offices, journalism and media professionals and others to develop skills in communicating statistics, data visualization and advocacy.

=== Capacity development ===
Statistical Capacity Development Outlook & Monitor

In March 2019, PARIS21 published its Statistical Capacity Development Outlook report on "current trends, challenges and emerging approaches in statistical capacity development". An online, interactive "Statistical Capacity Monitor" platform was launched in coordination with the report, aiming to "play a role in guiding future efforts to develop capacity within and across national statistical systems and to support co-ordination efforts among donors". 13 As of January 2020, the PARIS21 Statistical Capacity Monitor features 109 indicators on statistical capacity and capacity development to "support countries, donors and service providers to tailor capacity development programmes in statistics". The Monitor provides access to an evolving set of indicators on statistical capacity intended to offer insight on where countries stand in different areas of capacity. It "facilitates country and regional comparisons across multiple dimensions of statistical capacity, presenting trends in key drivers (such as funding and legislation).”

Capacity Development 4.0

According to its website, PARIS21 coined the term "Capacity Development 4.0" in 2016 to describe a new way of undertaking capacity development in national statistical systems. Capacity Development 4.0 is defined as:

"the process through which a country’s national statistical system, its organisations and individuals, obtain, strengthen and maintain their abilities to collect, produce, analyse and disseminate high-quality data to meet user needs".

This approach is intended to bring together new data stakeholders, better involves users and to promote a holistic view of statistical capacity development. It is meant to go beyond technical skills, and emphasises "softer" skills such as leadership, change management, advocacy and networking. In January 2020, PARIS21 published its Guidelines for Developing Statistical Capacity: A Roadmap for Capacity Development 4.0.

=== Innovation ===
Advanced Data Planning Tool

PARIS21 launched its Advanced Data Planning Tool (ADAPT) in 2017 as a free cloud-based tool for national statistical offices and "other data producers to adapt their data production to the priority data needs from policy makers". ADAPT was designed for data demand and supply analysis, developing of NSDS and other data plans and to monitor data plan activities, including costing and budgeting. The tool itself can be customised to accommodate country-specific needs, and it offers support in multiple languages.

While ADAPT is an online tool, it is also used in face-to-face field workshops organised worldwide by PARIS21 and partners to train national statistical offices on data planning.

In 2019, PARIS21 introduced a gender-specific module to ADAPT.

Citizen Generated Data

PARIS21 works with national statistical offices to support the use of citizen-generated data (CGD) in official reporting. PARIS21's support addresses areas of country-level advocacy, coordination and collaboration mechanisms and capacity development. PARIS21 also works to develop quality assurance frameworks for CGD validation and integration.

PARIS21 Academy

In January 2020, PARIS21 launched an e-learning platform called PARIS21 Academy which is open to anyone, but "primarily serves staff from official statistical agencies and data users like journalists". The platform hosts multimedia content including e-learning modules on topics such as data planning, gender statistics, data communication, financing data for development, trust in data and statistics, and statistical capacity development.

=== Supporting gender statistics ===
PARIS21 collaborates with UN Women since 2018 under the latter's flagship programme "Women Count" to support gender statistics at the global, regional and national level. As part of this collaboration, PARIS21 – in cooperation with national and international experts in gender statistics – developed a Gender Statistics Assessment Framework to help countries evaluate the state of gender statistics in terms of data and capacity gaps. The assessment is meant to provide input on mainstreaming the gender perspective in national strategies for the development of statistics, a process which is currently underway in Cambodia and El Salvador (as of January 2020). PARIS21's assessment process has also been piloted in the Dominican Republic, Egypt, the Kyrgyz Republic, Maldives and Senegal. The integration of gender statistics in the national statistical strategies is intended to secure political interest and funding which can enhance production and dissemination.

PARIS21 is also working to improve data dissemination and communication of gender statistics through media engagement and data visualization trainings. An e-learning module on communicating gender statistics for journalists and producers of statistics is being developed for the PARIS21 Academy. PARIS21 is also reporting on developing partners' support to gender statistics through a special module in its PRESS report. The gender module of the PRESS survey provides valuable information on bilateral and multilateral donor support to projects targeting gender statistics.

=== Role in international activities ===
Bern Network on Financing Data for Development

The Bern Network on Financing Data for Development formed in 2019 and is described by PARIS21 as an "open, multi-stakeholder alliance to support the 2030 Agenda for Sustainable Development by promoting more and better financing for data". The Bern Network is focused on low-income countries and fragile states, working to "support better identification of needs, improved investment proposals, better co-ordination at the country level, and bridge domestic and external financial and technical support for low-capacity countries".

In December 2019, the Bern Network released a paper on its five action areas to improve the quality and quantity of funding for development data, building on an earlier report published in July 2019.

Network members are currently working to develop concrete commitments on more and better funding for data to be launched at the United Nations World Data Forum on Sustainable Development Data 2020 in Bern, Switzerland.

Cross Regional Engagement / Cross Regional Fora

PARIS21's annual Cross Regional Fora began in 2015 as a platform of engagement and exchange to bring together multiple stakeholders from the national, regional and global levels to discuss good practices, experiences and challenges surrounding various themes in statistics. The fora also serve as a venue to advance recommendations for improving current statistical practices, while also contributing to knowledge creation and sharing. The most recent Cross Regional Forum in 2019 centred on trust in data and official statistics. Participants represented national statistical offices, international organisations, civil society and academia. The 2019 Forum also launched the PARIS21 2020 Trust Initiative, a project funding opportunity for proposals of how to "enhance trust" in data at the country level.

== See also ==
- List of national and international statistical services
- United Nations Statistics Division
- United Nations Statistical Commission
- Committee for the Coordination of Statistical Activities (CCSA)
