= Statistics department (Anguilla) =

Anguilla Statistics Department
Agency overview
- Formed: 1958
- Superseding agency: Ministry of Finance, Economic Development, Investments & Tourism
- Type: National statistics service
- Headquarters: The Valley, Anguilla
- Agency executive: Mrs. Lori-Rae Alleyne-Franklin, Chief Statistician
- Parent department: Economic Development, Investment and Commerce
- Website: www.gov.ai/statistics

The Anguilla Statistics Department, subject to the Statistics Act of 2000, reports to the Minister charged with responsibility for the subject of Statistics; the Head of the Department is referred to as the Statistician also designated as the Chief Statistician. It was created mainly to facilitate the development of a statistical system for Anguilla which is also a component of both the regional statistical systems of CARICOM and OECS, together with other member countries of these two regional institutions.

== Mission ==
As stated by the Statistics Law, the mission of the Anguilla Statistics Department is:

- to collect, compile, analyses abstract and publish statistical information relative to the commercial, industrial, social, economic and general activities and conditions of the people who are the inhabitants of Anguilla:
- to collaborate with all other departments of Government and with local authorities in the collection, computation and publication of statistical records of administration;
- to take any census in Anguilla; and
- generally to organize a coordinated scheme of social and economic statistics and intelligence pertaining to Anguilla;

The Law lists matters the Statistics department shall collect statistics on, with prior approval of the Governor in Council.

== Organisation ==
Under the Chief Statistician authority, the Department activities are distributed according to the following areas:

- Economic Statistics
- Social Statistics
- Tourism and International Trade Statistics
- Administration

== History ==
Previous heads of the Statistics department
| Name | Period |
|---|---|
| Ms Penny Hope-Ross | |

== See also ==
- Sub-national autonomous statistical services
- United Nations Statistics Division
