= Direction générale de la statistique et des études économiques =

Gabon's principal government institution in charge of statistics and census data

The Direction générale de la statistique et des études économique (French pronunciation: [diʁɛksjɔ̃ ʒeneʁal də la statistik e dez‿etyd(z‿)ekɔnɔmik], DGSEE) is the official statistical service of Gabon, established in its current form in 1976. Its activities are organized within the broader framework of the statistical system of Gabon. The DGSEE is a branch of the central government under the authority of the Minister responsible for Statistics. On 31 May 1983, its powers and organization were identified by a decree. Very generally, DGSEE is responsible for ensuring the technical coordination of the national statistical system and to disseminate statistical data for the purposes of the government, private sector, development partners and the public. Affiliated with Afristat, since 2009 it has been led by Francis Thierry Tiwinot.
