= Syrian Planning and Statistics Commission =

Syrian government agency

- هيئة التخطيط والإحصاء السورية
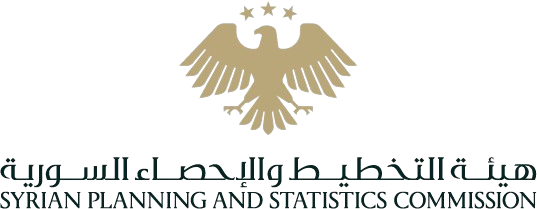

Institute overview
- Formed: May 17, 2025; 15 months ago (as successor to the General Authority for Planning and International Cooperation)
- Preceding agencies: General Authority for Planning and International Cooperation; Central Bureau of Statistics
- Jurisdiction: Government of Syria
- Headquarters: Damascus, Syria
- Institute executive: Anas Radwan Salim, Head of the Commission
- Website: psc.gov.sy

The Syrian Planning and Statistics Commission (Arabic: هيئة التخطيط والإحصاء السورية, romanized: Hayʾat al-Takhṭīṭ wa-al-Iḥṣāʾ al-Sūriyyah) is the Syrian government body responsible for national economic and social development planning and for the collection and publication of official statistics. It is based in Damascus. The body was created in May 2025 under the Syrian transitional government through the renaming and restructuring of the former General Authority for Planning and International Cooperation and the absorption of the Central Bureau of Statistics.

== History ==
=== Ba'athist-era origins ===
The institution traces its lineage to the Ministry of State for Planning Affairs, established under Legislative Decree No. 86 of 1968. Under Decree No. 5 of 2004, which amended the 1968 decree, the post of Minister of State for Planning Affairs was replaced by that of Head of the State Planning Commission (Arabic: هيئة تخطيط الدولة), reconstituting the body as the State Planning Commission.

The State Planning Commission functioned as the technical arm of the Presidency of the Council of Ministers, supporting the Supreme Planning Council in preparing and supervising long-, medium- and short-term national and sectoral development plans, securing international cooperation in support of those plans, and providing the government with technical assistance on economic development matters. In this capacity it prepared the Tenth Five-Year Plan for economic development (2006–2010), adopted under Law No. 25 of 2006, and the long-term "Syria 2025" development vision.

In December 2010, the People's Assembly approved the creation of the General Authority for Planning and International Cooperation (Arabic: هيئة التخطيط والتعاون الدولي), which succeeded the State Planning Commission and assumed its rights and obligations.

During the Syrian civil war, work on medium-term planning (the Eleventh Five-Year Plan) and the long-term "Syria 2025" vision was suspended, and the body's activity was largely confined to discussing annual plans in cooperation with the Ministry of Finance and submitting plan-implementation follow-up reports to the government. From 2016, it began developing a "post-crisis Syria" programme intended as a roadmap for the transition out of the conflict.

=== 2025 restructuring ===
Following the fall of the Assad regime, President Ahmed al-Sharaa issued Legislative Decree No. 18 of 2025 on 17 May 2025, renaming the General Authority for Planning and International Cooperation as the Planning and Statistics Commission and amending its mandate accordingly. Under the same decree, responsibility for managing international cooperation was transferred to the Ministry of Foreign Affairs and Expatriates, which became the central authority for international cooperation in Syria.

The Central Bureau of Statistics, established in 2005, was merged into the new commission, ending its existence as an independent agency. The merger was effected under Decree No. 27 of 2025, which also appointed Anas Radwan Salim as head of the commission.

== Functions ==
The commission's stated tasks include proposing national and regional development visions, strategies and long-, medium- and short-term plans for economic and social development; preparing the principal strategic directions for the economic sectors; proposing economic policies in response to market signals; and producing studies and reports on Syria's development challenges. Following the 2025 merger, it is also responsible for the country's official statistics.

== See also ==
- Economy of Syria
- Ministry of Economy and Industry (Syria)
