= Lao Statistics Bureau =

Government statistical agency of Laos

- Logo of the Lao Statistics Bureau

Agency overview
- Formed: 2010
- Headquarters: Vientiane, Laos
- Website: lsb.gov.la

Lao Statistics Bureau is the state agency charged with the collection and publication of statistics related to the economy, population and society of Laos.
