= Inn (disambiguation) =

An inn is an establishment where travelers can procure food, drink and lodging.

Inn may also refer to:

- Inn (river), which flows through Switzerland, Austria and Germany
- Inn (district of Switzerland), a district in Switzerland named for the river Inn
- Inner automorphism, in mathematics, a set of functions on groups
- Inns of Court, London, England, institutions
- InterNetNews, Usenet News server
- Frank Inn (1916–2002), American animal trainer
- Inn Sarin (born 1995), Thai actor

== See also ==
- INN (disambiguation), as a three-letter acronym
- In (disambiguation)
