= Central Bureau of Statistics (Aruba) =

Aruba's principal government institution in charge of statistics and census data

Central Bureau of Statistics Aruba
- Centraal Bureau voor de Statistiek Aruba

Agency overview
- Formed: 1986
- Superseding agency: Ministerie van Economische Zaken, Sociale Zaken en Cultuur
- Type: National statistics service
- Headquarters: Oranjestad, Aruba
- Employees: 40
- Agency executive: LLM Dhr. Marlon Faarup, Director of Statistics
- Parent department: Ministerie van Economische Zaken, Sociale Zaken en Cultuur
- Website: www.cbs.aw

The Central Bureau of Statistics of Aruba, is in charge of the collection, processing and publication of statistics and reports to the Minister charged with responsibility for the subject of Statistics. It was created mainly to facilitate the development of a statistical system for Aruba which is also a component of the CARICOM regional statistical system together with other member countries of this regional institution.

== Legislation ==
Statistics Aruba is governed by the Statistics Act, GT 1991.

== Organisation ==
The Central Bureau of Statistics (CBS) is the institution officially assigned with the collection, processing and publication of statistics to be used by policymakers, in practice and for research in different areas. It is a government department that resorts under the jurisdiction of the Ministry of Finance and Economic Affairs.

=== Leadership ===
The director of Statistics Aruba is the Chief Statistician of Aruba. Since 1986, the former directors of the Central Bureau of Statistics Aruba were:

- Enrique Jaccopucci (1986–1994)
- Randolf Lee (1996-2009)
- Martijn Balkestein (2009 - 2014)
- Management Team ( Marlon Faarup, Mary Geerman, Yasmara Pourrier) (2015 - 2016)
- Marlon Faarup (2016 - 2017)
- Desiree Helder (Deputy Director) (2017 - 2022)
- Marlon Faarup (2022 - 2026)

== History ==
Previous heads of the statistics service in Aruba
Name:	Period
Marlon Faarup	2022 - 2026
Desiree Helder ( Deputy Director )	2017 - 2022
Marlon Faarup	2016 - 2017
Management Team ( Marlon Faarup, Mary Geerman, Yasmara Pourrier )	2015 - 2016
Martijn Balkestein	2009 - 2014
Randolf Lee	1996-2009
Enrique Jaccopucci	1986–1994
	-1986

== Publications ==
Statistics Aruba publishes numerous documents covering a range of statistical information about Aruba, including census data, demography, Tourism, economic and health indicators,

== See also ==
- Statistics Netherlands
- Sub-national autonomous statistical services
- United Nations Statistics Division
