= Statistics Faroe Islands =

National statistical authority of the Faroe Islands

- Hagstova Føroya

Agency overview
- Formed: 7 May 1991
- Type: Independent authority
- Jurisdiction: Faroe Islands
- Headquarters: Kvíggjartún 1, FO-165, Argir, Faroe Islands
- Employees: 19
- Agency executive: Gilli Wardum, Director General
- Website: www.hagstova.fo

Statistics Faroe Islands (Faroese: Hagstova Føroya) is the national statistical authority of the Faroe Islands. It is an independent authority supervised by the Ministry of Finance. It was established, following a parliamentary act voted by the Løgting on 7 May 1991.

As of 2020, it employs 19 people and it is located in Argir. Statistics Faroe Islands cooperates with the statistical authorities of Nordic countries to create joint publications.

== See also ==
- List of national and international statistical services
