= Monaco Statistics =

Statistics agency of Monaco

- French: Institut Monégasque de la Statistique et des Études Économiques

Agency overview
- Formed: 24 January 2011
- Headquarters: 9 rue de Gabian, Monaco
- Agency executive: Sophie Vincent
- Website: www.monacostatistics.mc

Monaco Statistics (French: Institut Monégasque de la Statistique et des Études Économiques, or IMSEE) is the statistics agency of Monaco. The agency was stablished in 2011 to serve as an information service and to provide indicators for monitoring the economic and social development of the principality.

As of 2021, its director is Sophie Vincent.
