= Independent Network News =

Independent Network News may refer to:

- Independent Network News (news agency), a former radio news service in Ireland
- Independent Network News (TV program), a 1980–1990 American syndicated television news program

== See also ==
- Independent News Network, now News Hub, an American TV news service
- American Independent Institute, a pseudo-news organization
- Institute for Nonprofit News
