= Arab Institute for Training, Research and Statistics =

International research institute

The Arab Institute for Statistics (Arabic: المعهد العربي للتدريب والبحوث والإحصاء), formally the Arab Institute for Training and Research in Statistics (AITRS) (Arabic: المعهد العربي للتدريب والبحوث والإحصاء) is an intergovernmental statistical institute serving the National Statistical Offices in all Arab League countries. It was established in 1971 by the United Nations Development Programme (UNDP) under the name "Regional Institute for training and Research in Statistics for the Near East".

== Board of trustees ==
The Board of Trustees is composed of the heads of the national statistical offices in all Arab League countries. They meet once per year.

== See also ==
- Arab Fund for Economic and Social Development (AFESD)
- Bloudan Conference (1937)
- Council of Arab Economic Unity (CAEU)
- General Union of Chambers of Commerce, Industry and Agriculture for Arab Countries
- International Confederation of Arab Trade Unions
- List of national and international statistical services
