= Statistical Office of the Republic of Serbia =

Serbia's government agency in charge of collecting and disseminating statistics

- Републички завод за статистику Србије

Institute overview
- Formed: 1862; 164 years ago
- Jurisdiction: Serbia
- Headquarters: Milana Rakića 5, Belgrade
- Employees: 455
- Website: stat.gov.rs

The Statistical Office of the Republic of Serbia (Serbian: Републички завод за статистику Србије, romanized: Republički zavod za statistiku Srbije or RZS) is a government agency of Serbia charged with collecting and disseminating official statistics.

== History ==
Official statistics in Serbia was established in 1862, when Prince Mihailo Obrenović passed an act granting powers to the economic department of the Ministry of Finance concerning all statistical work. This was the beginning of the national statistics in Serbia, but historic data suggest there was even earlier collecting of statistical data on taxpayers, census of the livestock (in 1824) and regular population censuses (from 1834), as well as regular monitoring of statistical data on external trade, domestic trade, prices, and wages (since 1843). Statistical work was performed even before the foundation of the Statistical Institute through participation of Serbian representatives at international congresses of statisticians held in 1859, 1863, and 1867.

The Law on the Organization of Statistics was enacted in 1881, and the Ministry of National Economy assumed responsibility regarding national statistics. The Statistical Institute of Serbia has been a founding member of the International Statistical Institute. The Statistical Institute of Serbia was merged in 1919 into the Directorate of the National Statistics, formed as part of the Ministry of Social Policy of the newly-established Kingdom of Serbs, Croats, and Slovenes. The Statistical Institute of Serbia was re-established in 1945 and until 2003 was subordinated to the Statistical Institute of Yugoslavia regarding the process of conducting unique programs of statistical surveys and methodologies while simultaneously being independent regarding financial and human resources.

Regarding the publishing activity, the first National Statistics of Serbia were published in 1863 and the first results of population census in 1863. The first Statistical Yearbook of the Kingdom of Serbia was published in 1893 and in 1894 the National Statistics were published for the last time. The last Statistical Yearbook of the Kingdom of Serbia was published in 1910. In 1954 the Statistical Yearbook of Serbia, as a complex statistical publication that encompassed the results of versatile statistical surveys, started to be published again after a hiatus of almost half a century.
