= Statistical Office of the Republic of Slovenia =

Slovenian independent state institution

Coordinates: 46°04′52″N 14°29′42″E

The Statistical Office of the Republic of Slovenia (SURS) (Slovene: Statistični urad Republike Slovenije, SURS) is an independent Slovenian state institution in charge of official statistical surveying. It reports directly to the prime minister of Slovenia. One of the office's activities is a nationwide census every 10 years, the last one being conducted in 2011. The office is located at Litostrojska cesta 54 in Ljubljana. As of April 2024, its director-general is Apolonija Oblak Flander.

== Directors ==
- Alojz Dular (1944–1945)
- Silva Exel Škerlak (1945–1948)
- Boris Debevec (1948–1951)
- Vojko Konvalinka (1951–1954)
- Rajko Kiauta (1954–1967)
- Franta Komel (1967–1981)
- Tomaž Banovec (1981–2003)
- Irena Križman (2003–2013)
- Genovefa Ružić (2013–2019)
- Bojan Nastav (2019–2020)
- Tomaž Smrekar (2020–2023)
- Apolonija Oblak Flander (2024–present)
