= National Institute of Statistics (Cameroon) =

Government statistics agency of Cameroon

The National Institute of Statistics (French: Institut national de la statistique, INS) is an agency of the government of Cameroon. Its head office is in the centre of Yaoundé, in front of the Immeuble rose.
