= Food security =

Measure of food availability

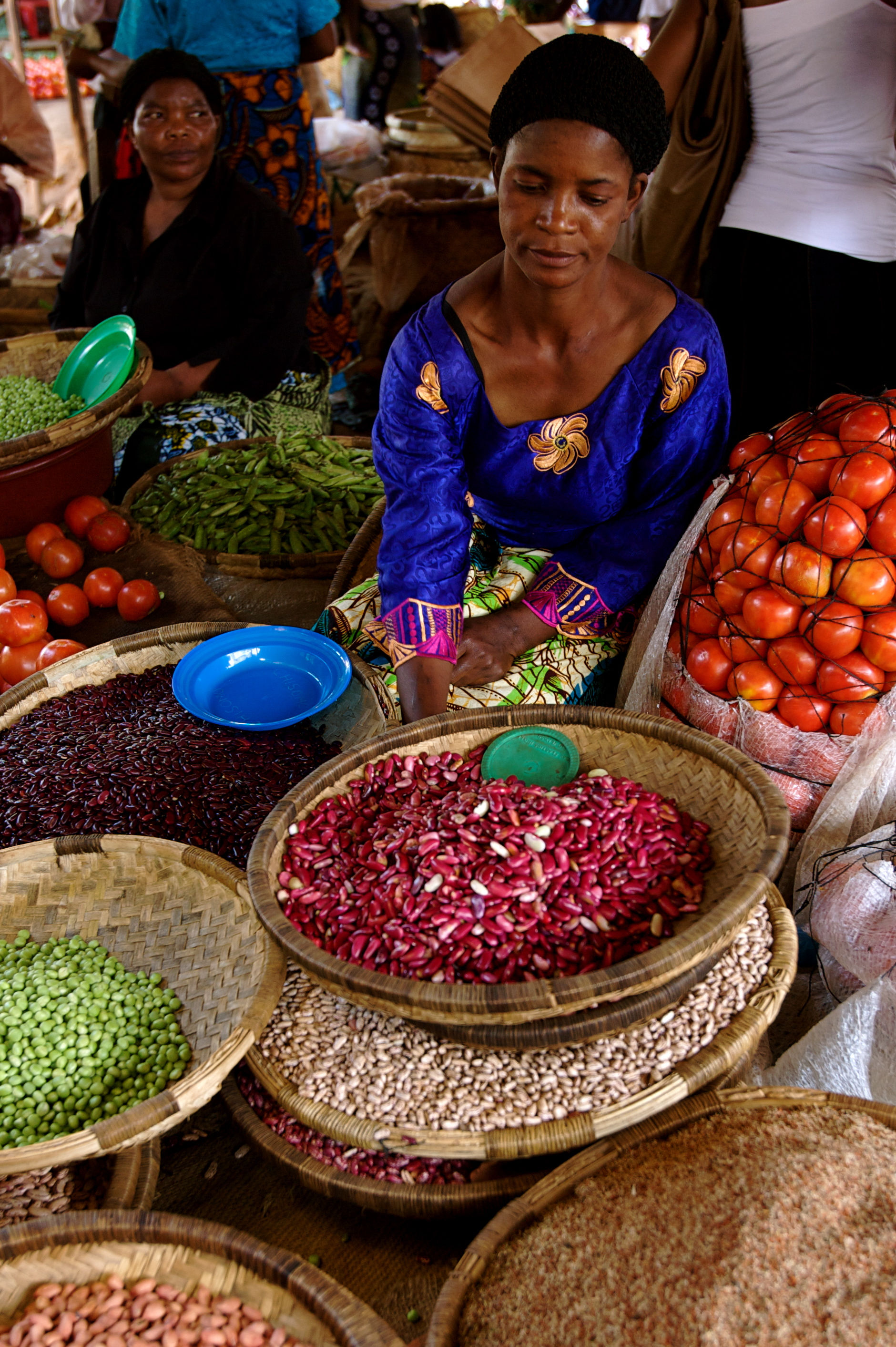
Women selling produce at a market in Lilongwe, Malawi

Food security is the state of having reliable access to a sufficient quantity of affordable, healthy food. The availability of food for people of any class, gender, status, ethnicity, or religion is another element of food protection. Similarly, household food security is considered to exist when all the members of a family have consistent access to enough food for an active, healthy life. Food-secure individuals do not live in hunger or fear of starvation. Food security includes resilience to future disruptions of food supply. Such a disruption could occur due to various risk factors such as droughts and floods, shipping disruptions, fuel shortages, economic instability, and wars. Food insecurity is the opposite of food security: a state where there is only limited or uncertain availability of suitable food.

The concept of food security has evolved over time. The four pillars of food security include availability, access, utilization, and stability. In addition, there are two more dimensions that are important: agency and sustainability. These six dimensions of food security are reinforced in conceptual and legal understandings of the right to food. The World Food Summit in 1996 declared that "food should not be used as an instrument for political and economic pressure."

Food insecurity goes beyond hunger; it includes people who do not have regular access to nutritious and sufficient food, even if they may not necessarily be suffering from hunger. In 2024, an estimated 28.0 percent of the world population, or 2.28 billion people, has experienced food insecurity at moderate or severe levels. There are many causes of food insecurity. The most important ones are high food prices and disruptions in global food supplies for example due to war. Climate change, water scarcity, land degradation, agricultural diseases, pandemics and disease outbreaks can also create food insecurity. Additionally, food insecurity affects individuals with low socioeconomic status, affects the health of a population on an individual level, and causes divisions in interpersonal relationships. Food insecurity due to unemployment causes a higher rate of poverty.

The effects of food insecurity can include hunger and even famines. Chronic food insecurity translates into a high degree of vulnerability to hunger and famine. Chronic hunger and malnutrition in childhood can lead to stunted growth of children. Once stunting has occurred, improved nutritional intake after the age of about two years is unable to reverse the damage. Severe malnutrition in early childhood often leads to defects in cognitive development.

About 2.3 billion people in the world are estimated to have been moderately or severely food insecure in 2024. The global prevalence of moderate or severe food insecurity has declined gradually since 2021, reaching 28.0% in 2024. Food insecurity is on the rise in Africa and falling in Latin America and the Caribbean; it has been decreasing gradually in Asia for several consecutive years, while in Oceania and in Northern America and Europe, new estimates point to a slight decline from 2023 to 2024 following a several-year rise. Globally and in almost every region, food insecurity is more prevalent in rural areas than in urban areas.

== Definition ==
Number of people severely food insecure

Total daily supply of calories per person

Food security, as defined by the World Food Summit in 1996, is "when all people, at all times, have physical and economic access to sufficient, safe and nutritious food that meets their dietary needs and food preferences for an active and healthy life".

Food insecurity, on the other hand, as defined by the United States Department of Agriculture (USDA), is a situation of "limited or uncertain availability of nutritionally adequate and safe foods or limited or uncertain ability to acquire acceptable foods in socially acceptable ways."

At the 1974 World Food Conference, the term food security was defined with an emphasis on supply; it was defined as the "availability at all times of adequate, nourishing, diverse, balanced and moderate world food supplies of basic foodstuffs to sustain a steady expansion of food consumption and to offset the fluctuations in production and prices." Later definitions added demand and access issues to the definition. The first World Food Summit, held in 1996, stated that food security "exists when all people, at all times, have physical and economic access to sufficient, safe and nutritious food to meet their dietary needs and food preferences for an active and healthy life."

Chronic (or permanent) food insecurity is defined as the long-term, persistent lack of adequate food. In this case, households are constantly at risk of being unable to acquire food to meet the needs of all members. Chronic and transitory food insecurity are linked since the recurrence of transitory food security can make households more vulnerable to chronic food insecurity. Acute food insecurity is a label for any transitory food insecurity that threatens people's lives or livelihoods.

As of 2015, the concept of food security has mostly focused on food calories rather than the quality and nutrition of food. The concept of nutrition security or nutritional security evolved as a broader concept. In 1995, it was defined as "adequate nutritional status in terms of protein, energy, vitamins, and minerals for all household members at all times." It is also related to the concepts of nutrition education and nutritional deficiency.

== Measurement ==
The gender gap narrowed at the global level from 2021 to 2023, but increased slightly in 2024, with the prevalence of food insecurity remaining consistently higher among women than among men, globally and in all regions

Food security can be measured by the number of calories to digest per person per day, available on a household budget. In general, the objective of food security indicators and measurements is to capture some or all of the main components of food security in terms of food availability, accessibility, and utilization/adequacy. While availability (production and supply) and utilization/adequacy (nutritional status/ anthropometric measurement) are easier to estimate and therefore more popular, accessibility (the ability to acquire a sufficient quantity and quality of food) remains largely elusive. The factors influencing household food accessibility are often context-specific.

FAO has developed the Food Insecurity Experience Scale (FIES) as a universally applicable experience-based food security measurement scale derived from the scale used in the United States. Thanks to the establishment of a global reference scale and the procedure needed to calibrate measures obtained in different countries, it is possible to use the FIES to produce cross-country comparable estimates of the prevalence of food insecurity in the population. Since 2015, the FIES has been adopted as the basis to compile one of the indicators included in the Sustainable Development Goals (SDG) monitoring framework.

Food insecurity levels based on the food insecurity experience scale by region (2015–2024)

The Food and Agriculture Organization of the United Nations (FAO), the World Food Programme (WFP), the International Fund for Agricultural Development (IFAD), the World Health Organization (WHO), and the United Nations Children's Fund (UNICEF) collaborate every year to produce The State of Food Security and Nutrition in the World, or SOFI report (known as The State of Food Insecurity in the World until 2015).

The SOFI report measures chronic hunger (or undernourishment) using two main indicators, the Number of undernourished (NoU) and the Prevalence of undernourishment (PoU). Beginning in the early 2010s, FAO incorporated more complex metrics into its calculations, including estimates of food losses in retail distribution for each country and the volatility in agri-food systems. Since 2014, it has also reported the prevalence of moderate or severe food insecurity based on the FIES.

The report plays a critical role in tracking global progress toward Sustainable Development Goal 2 (Zero Hunger), identifying emerging crises, and shaping international policy responses by providing reliable, comparable data across regions and over time.

While the SOFI focuses on chronic food insecurity, figures on acute food insecurity are published in the Global Report on Food Crises by the Food Security Information Network. The food security status in individual countries is evaluated under the Integrated Food Security Phase Classification (IPC) system, and continually reported by WFP.

Several measurements have been developed to capture the access component of food security, with some notable examples developed by the USAID-funded Food and Nutrition Technical Assistance (FANTA) project. These include:

- Household Food Insecurity Access Scale – measures the degree of food insecurity (inaccessibility) in the household in the previous month on a discrete ordinal scale.
- Household Dietary Diversity Scale – measures the number of different food groups consumed over a specific reference period (24hrs/48hrs/7days).
- Household Hunger Scale – measures the experience of household food deprivation based on a set of predictable reactions, captured through a survey and summarized in a scale.
- Coping Strategies Index (CSI) – assesses household behaviors and rates them based on a set of varied established behaviors on how households cope with food shortages. The methodology for this research is based on collecting data on a single question: "What do you do when you do not have enough food, and do not have enough money to buy food?"

== Prevalence ==
Global food insecurity levels declined gradually from 2020 to 2025, with steady progress in Asia and Latin America and the Caribbean, and signs of recent improvement in Africa. Updated global estimates point to a decrease in world hunger in recent years following the sharp increase from 2019 to 2021

Food insecurity levels by region and sex (2024)

Close to 12% of the global population was severely food insecure in 2020, representing 928 million people – 148 million more than in 2019. In 2023 prevalence of moderate or severe food insecurity in Africa (58.0%) is nearly double the global average.

Global food and agricultural markets are operating in an era of heightened uncertainty driven by extreme weather events, financial disturbances, geopolitical tensions and conflicts, pandemics, outbreaks of diseases and pests, energy price fluctuations, and socioeconomic crises. These shocks affect supply, demand, prices and trade flows, and their effects can be transitory or persistent. Global food and agricultural trade has proven resilient, but shocks can still lead to substantial short-term disruptions. So far, these effects have been transitory, pointing to the capacity of the global markets to absorb, adapt to and recover from shocks. Even short-term effects can give rise to significant food security risks.

Slowdowns and downturns since the 2008–9 financial crisis have conspired to degrade social conditions, making undernourishment more prevalent. Structural imbalances and a lack of inclusive policies have combined with extreme weather events, altered environmental conditions, and the spread of pests and diseases, such as the COVID-19 pandemic, triggering stubborn cycles of poverty and hunger. In 2019, the high cost of healthy diets together with persistently high levels of income inequality put healthy diets out of reach for around 3 billion people, especially the poor, in every region of the world. In 2023 28.9 percent of the global population – 2.33 billion people – were moderately or severely food insecure, meaning they did not have regular access to adequate food. These estimates include 10.7 percent of the population – or more than 864 million people – who were severely food insecure, meaning they had run out of food at times during the year and, at worst, gone an entire day or more without eating.

In 2025, an estimated 2.1 billion people – 25.8% of the global population – were moderately or severely food insecure. 778.6 million people, or 9.5% of the global population, this is down from 28.7% in 2020. Nearly 86 million fewer people experienced food insecurity in 2025 compared to 2024, and 135 million fewer compared to 2020. Steady progress in food security has been seen in Asia and Latin America and the Caribbean since 2020, and there was improvement in Africa in 2025 for the first time since the 2030. The global prevalence of moderate or severe food insecurity was consistently higher in rural areas than in peri-urban areas, and lowest in urban areas; it was higher among women than among men, although the difference was smaller in 2025 compared to 2024.

In 2025, more than half the population of Africa (56.6%) was moderately or severely food insecure, compared to 20.3% in Asia, 22.9% in Latin America and the Caribbean, and 8.7% in Northern America and Europe. A steady decrease in food insecurity has been seen in Asia and Latin America and the Caribbean since 2020, and there was improvement in Africa in 2025 for the first time since 2015.

Inequality in the distributions of assets, resources and income, compounded by the absence or scarcity of welfare provisions in the poorest of countries, is further undermining access to food. Nearly a tenth of the world population still lives on US$1.90 or less a day, with sub-Saharan Africa and southern Asia the regions most affected.

High import and export dependence ratios are meanwhile making many countries more vulnerable to external shocks. In many low-income economies, debt has swollen to levels far exceeding GDP, eroding growth prospects.

Globally and in most regions, the prevalence of food insecurity has remained consistently higher in rural areas than in urban areas since 2022.

Finally, there are increasing risks to institutional stability, persistent violence, and large-scale population relocation as a consequence of the conflicts. With the majority of them being hosted in developing nations, the number of displaced individuals between 2010 and 2018 increased by 70% between 2010 and 2018 to reach 70.8 million.

Recent editions of the SOFI report (The State of Food Security and Nutrition in the World) present evidence that the decades-long decline in hunger in the world, as measured by the number of undernourished (NoU), has ended. In the 2020 report, FAO used newly accessible data from China to revise the global NoU downwards to nearly 690 million, or 8.9 percent of the world population – but having recalculated the historic hunger series accordingly, it confirmed that the number of hungry people in the world, albeit lower than previously thought, had been slowly increasing since 2014. On broader measures, the SOFI report found that far more people suffered some form of food insecurity, with 3 billion or more unable to afford even the cheapest healthy diet. Nearly 2.37 billion people did not have access to adequate food in 2020 – an increase of 320 million people compared to 2019.

FAO's 2021 edition of The State of Food and Agriculture (SOFA) further estimates that an additional 1 billion people (mostly in lower- and upper-middle-income countries) are at risk of not affording a healthy diet if a shock were to reduce their income by a third.

The 2021 edition of the SOFI report estimated the hunger excess linked to the COVID-19 pandemic at 30 million people by the end of the decade – FAO had earlier warned that even without the pandemic, the world was off track to achieve Zero Hunger or Goal 2 of the Sustainable Development Goals – it further found that already in the first year of the pandemic, the prevalence of undernourishment (PoU) had increased 1.5 percentage points, reaching a level of around 9.9 percent. This is the mid-point of an estimate of 720 to 811 million people facing hunger in 2020 – as many as 161 million more than in 2019. The number had jumped by some 446 million in Africa, 57 million in Asia, and about 14 million in Latin America and the Caribbean.

At the global level, the prevalence of food insecurity at a moderate or severe level, and severe level only, is higher among women than men, magnified in rural areas.

In 2025, the Global Report on Food Crises found that acute food insecurity affected approximately 266 million people across 47 countries. The largest food crises globally that year included those in Afghanistan, South Sudan, Sudan and Yemen, while famine was confirmed in parts of the Gaza Strip and Sudan.

About 2.3 billion people in the world are estimated to have been moderately or severely food insecure in 2024. The global prevalence of moderate or severe food insecurity has declined gradually since 2021, reaching 28.0% in 2024. Food insecurity is on the rise in Africa and falling in Latin America and the Caribbean; it has been decreasing gradually in Asia for several consecutive years, while in Oceania and in Northern America and Europe, new estimates point to a slight decline from 2023 to 2024 following a several-year rise. Globally and in almost every region, food insecurity is more prevalent in rural areas than in urban areas and affects more women than men.

=== Vulnerable groups ===
==== Children ====
Food insecurity in children can lead to developmental impairments and long term consequences such as weakened physical, intellectual and emotional development.

In 2024, 13.7 percent of U.S. households experienced food insecurity at some point during the year, including 5.4 percent that experienced very low food security. A 2012 study in the Journal of Applied Research on Children found that rates of food security varied significantly by race, class and education. In both kindergarten and third grade, 8% of the children were classified as food insecure, but only 5% of white children were food insecure, while 12% and 15% of black and Hispanic children were food insecure, respectively. In third grade, 13% of black and 11% of Hispanic children were food insecure compared to 5% of white children.

Households with children are also more susceptible to being food insecure. In 2016, 16.5% of families with children under the age of 18 did not have food security. According to a report from American Journal of Nursing, there are times where parents will reduce their own food intake in order to let their children be more food secure. However, this does not always protect the children, leaving many children of larger families to be vulnerable to food insecurity. A U.S. Department of Agriculture report in 2016 showed that half of the children in food insecure households were also food insecure themselves. Furthermore, 5% of children in food insecure households had very low food security.

==== Women ====
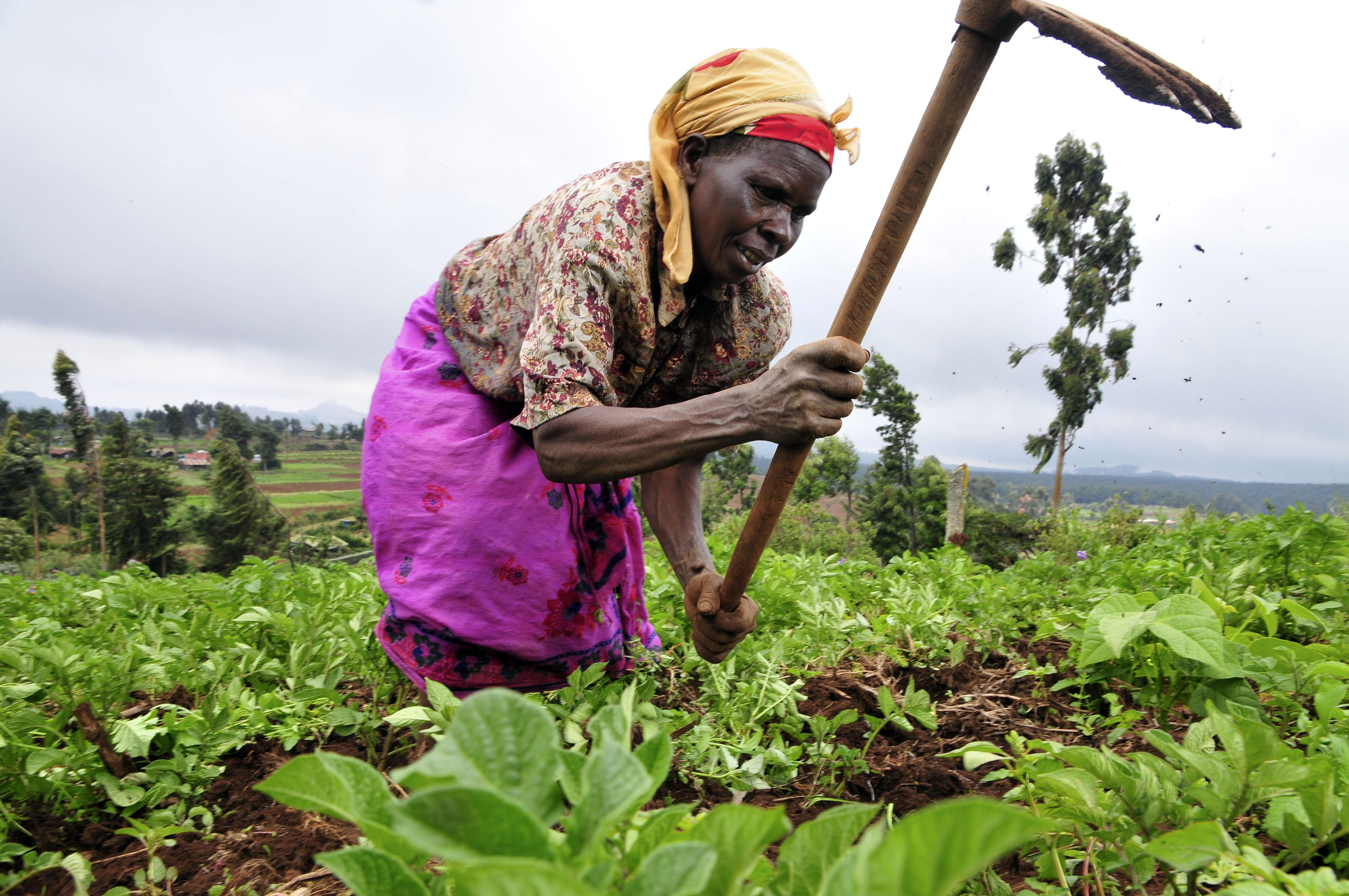
A Kenyan woman farmer at work in the Mount Kenya region

Gender inequality both leads to and is a result of food insecurity. According to estimates, girls and women make up 60% of the world's chronically hungry and little progress has been made in ensuring the equal right to food for women enshrined in the Convention on the Elimination of All Forms of Discrimination against Women.

At the global level, the gender gap in the prevalence of moderate or severe food insecurity grew even larger in the year of COVID-19 pandemic. The 2021 SOFI report finds that in 2019 an estimated 29.9 percent of women aged between 15 and 49 years around the world were affected by anemia.

The gap in food insecurity between men and women widened from 1.7 percentage points in 2019 to 4.3 percentage points in 2021.

Women play key roles in maintaining all four pillars of food security: as food producers and agricultural entrepreneurs; as decision-makers for the food and nutritional security of their households and communities and as "managers" of the stability of food supplies in times of economic hardship.

The gender gap in accessing food increased from 2018 to 2019, particularly at moderate or severe levels. In 2024 food insecurity still more prevalent among adult women than men in every region of the world. The gender gap widened considerably at the global level in the wake of the pandemic, most notably in 2021; it then grew smaller for two consecutive years followed by a widening of the gap at the global level between 2023 and 2024.

==== Racial and ethnic ====
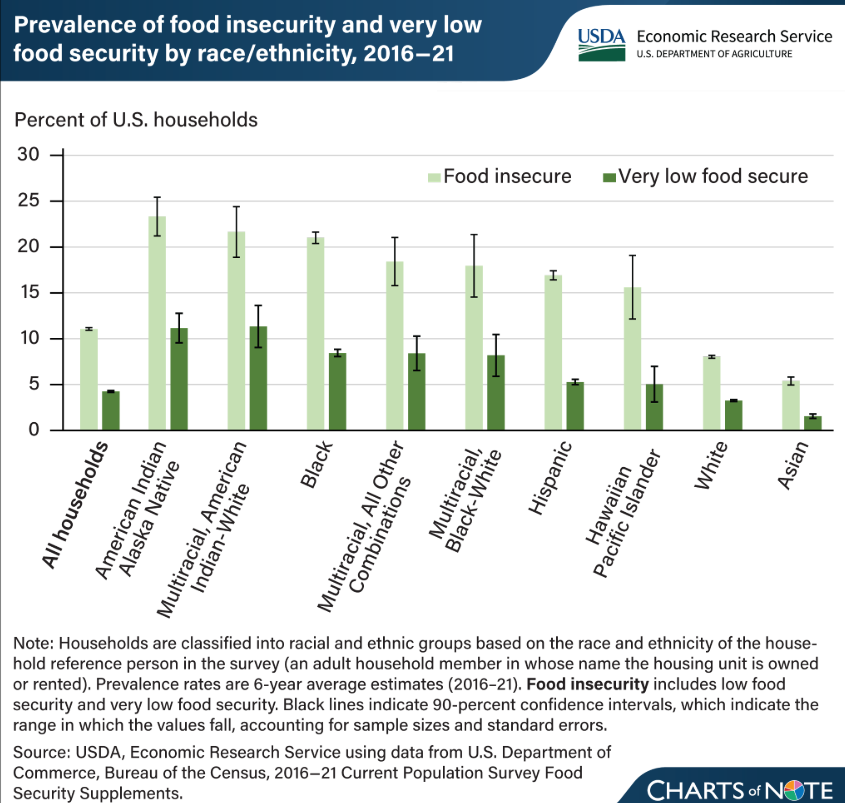
Prevalence of Food Insecurity and Very Low Food Security by Race and Ethnicity from 2016 – 2021usda.gov

According to a 2024 USDA study, between 2016 and 2021, the prevalence of food insecurity in the United States exhibited significant variation across different racial and ethnic groups. All households had a prevalence of food insecurity of 11.1%. Households led by individuals identifying as American Indian and Alaska Native experienced a food insecurity rate of 23.3%, while those identifying as Multiracial, American Indian-White reported a rate of 21.7%. Black households faced a 21.0% rate. Multiracial households of all other combinations reported 18.4%, and Multiracial, Black-White households had an 18.0% rate. Hispanic households experienced a 16.9% rate, and Native Hawaiian and Pacific Islander households reported 15.6%.

These rates were all significantly higher than the national average for all households. In contrast, households headed by White individuals had a food insecurity rate of 8.0%, and those headed by Asian individuals reported a rate of 5.4%, both significantly lower than the national average.

The pattern was similar for very low food security, a more severe form of food insecurity. Multiracial, American Indian-White households experienced the highest rate at 11.3%, while Asian households had the lowest at 1.6%. These disparities highlight the persistent differences in food security status across and within various racial and ethnic groups in the United States.

== History ==
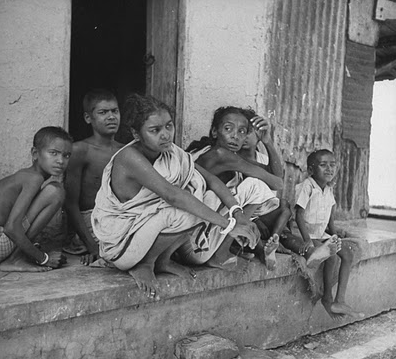
Bengali famine of 1943: The Japanese conquest of Burma cut off India's main supply of rice imports.

Famines have been frequent in world history. Some have killed millions and substantially diminished the population of a large area. The most common causes have been drought and war, but the greatest famines in history were caused by economic policy. One economic policy example of famine was the Holodomor (Great Famine) induced by the Soviet Union's communist economic policy resulting in 7–10 million deaths.

In the late 20th century the Nobel Prize-winning economist Amartya Sen observed that "there is no such thing as an apolitical food problem." While drought and other naturally occurring events may trigger famine conditions, it is government action or inaction that determines its severity, and often even whether or not a famine will occur. The 20th century has examples of governments, such as Collectivization in the Soviet Union or the Great Leap Forward in the People's Republic of China undermining the food security of their nations. Mass starvation is frequently a weapon of war, as in the blockade of Germany in World War I and World War II, the Battle of the Atlantic, and the blockade of Japan during World War I and World War II and in the Hunger Plan enacted by Nazi Germany.

== Pillars of food security ==
Growth in food production has been greater than population growth. Food per person increased since 1961. Data source: Food and Agriculture Organization.

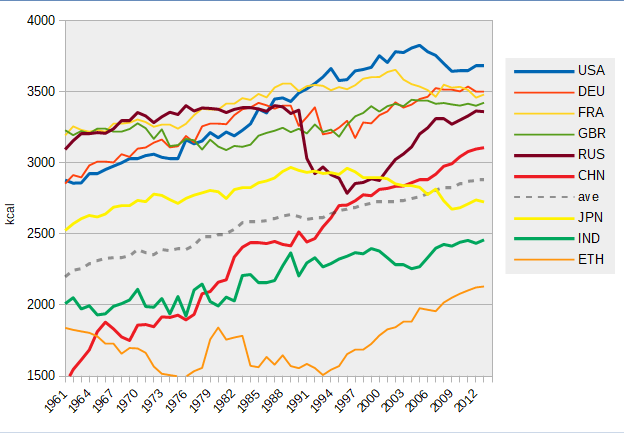
Growth of World Food Supply (caloric base) per capita

The WHO states that three pillars that determine food security: food availability, food access, and food use and misuse. The FAO added a fourth pillar: the stability of the first three dimensions of food security over time. In 2009, the World Summit on Food Security stated that the "four pillars of food security are availability, access, utilization, and stability." Two additional pillars of food security were recommended in 2020 by the High-Level Panel of Experts for the Committee on World Food Security: agency and sustainability.

=== Availability ===
Food availability relates to the supply of food through production, distribution, and exchange. Food production is determined by a variety of factors including land ownership and use; soil management; crop selection, breeding, and management; livestock breeding and management; and harvesting. Crop production can be affected by changes in rainfall and temperatures. The use of land, water, and energy to grow food often compete with other uses, which can affect food production. Land used for agriculture can be used for urbanization or lost to desertification, salinization or soil erosion due to unsustainable agricultural practices. Crop production is not required for a country to achieve food security. Nations do not have to have the natural resources required to produce crops to achieve food security, as seen in the examples of Japan and Singapore.

Food security improves as the degree of urbanization increases: in 2024, moderate or severe food insecurity affected 32.0% of adults living in rural areas compared with 28.6% in peri-urban areas and 23.9% in urban areas.

Because food consumers outnumber producers in every country, food must be distributed to different regions or nations. Food distribution involves the storage, processing, transport, packaging, and marketing of food. Food-chain infrastructure and storage technologies on farms can also affect the amount of food wasted in the distribution process. Poor transport infrastructure can increase the price of supplying water and fertilizer as well as the price of moving food to national and global markets. Around the world, few individuals or households are continuously self-reliant on food. This creates the need for a bartering, exchange, or cash economy to acquire food. The exchange of food requires efficient trading systems and market institutions, which can affect food security. Per capita world food supplies are more than adequate to provide food security to all, and thus food accessibility is a greater barrier to achieving food security.

=== Access ===
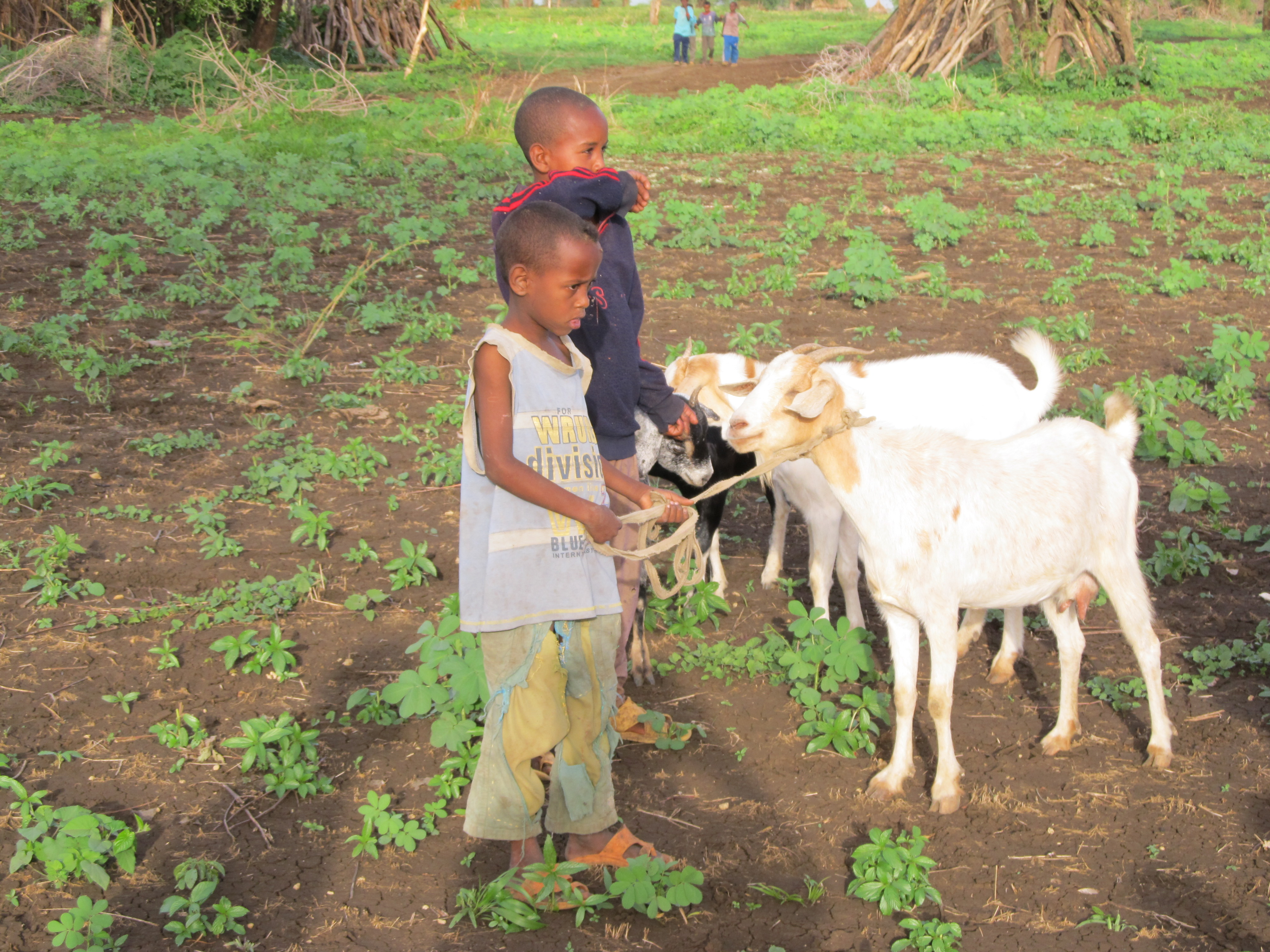
Goats are an important part of the solution to global food security because they are fairly low-maintenance and easy to raise and farm.

Food access refers to the affordability and allocation of food, as well as the preferences of individuals and households. The UN Committee on Economic, Social and Cultural Rights noted that the causes of hunger and malnutrition are often not a scarcity of food but an inability to access available food, usually due to poverty. Poverty can limit access to food, and can also increase how vulnerable an individual or household is to food price spikes. Access depends on whether the household has enough income to purchase food at prevailing prices or has sufficient land and other resources to grow its food. Households with enough resources can overcome unstable harvests and local food shortages and maintain their access to food.

Relationship between food insecurity and food prices, 2014–2024.

There are two distinct types of access to food: direct access, in which a household produces food using human and material resources, and economic access, in which a household purchases food produced elsewhere. Location can affect access to food and which type of access a family will rely on. The assets of a household, including income, land, products of labor, inheritances, and gifts can determine a household's access to food. However, the ability to access sufficient food may not lead to the purchase of food over other materials and services. Demographics and education levels of members of the household as well as the gender of the household head determine the preferences of the household, which influences the type of food that is purchased. A household's access to adequate nutritious food may not assure adequate food intake for all household members, as intrahousehold food allocation may not sufficiently meet the requirements of each member of the household. The USDA adds that access to food must be available in socially acceptable ways, without, for example, resorting to emergency food supplies, scavenging, stealing, or other coping strategies.

The monetary value of global food exports multiplied by 4.4 in nominal terms between 2000 and 2021, from US$380 billion in 2000 to US$1.66 trillion in 2021.

=== Utilization ===
The next pillar of food security is food utilization, which refers to the metabolism of food by individuals. Once the food is obtained by a household, a variety of factors affect the quantity and quality of food that reaches members of the household. To achieve food security, the food ingested must be safe and must be enough to meet the physiological requirements of each individual. Food safety affects food utilization, and can be affected by the preparation, processing, and cooking of food in the community and household.

Nutritional values of the household determine food choice, and whether food meets cultural preferences is important to utilization in terms of psychological and social well-being. Access to healthcare is another determinant of food utilization since the health of individuals controls how the food is metabolized. For example, intestinal parasites can take nutrients from the body and decrease food utilization. Sanitation can also decrease the occurrence and spread of diseases that can affect food utilization. Education about nutrition and food preparation can affect food utilization and improve this pillar of food security.

=== Stability ===
Food stability refers to the ability to obtain food over time. Food insecurity can be transitory, seasonal, or chronic. In transitory food insecurity, food may be unavailable during certain periods of time. At the food production level, natural disasters and drought result in crop failure and decreased food availability. Civil conflicts can also decrease access to food. Instability in markets resulting in food-price spikes can cause transitory food insecurity. Other factors that can temporarily cause food insecurity are loss of employment or productivity, which can be caused by illness. Seasonal food insecurity can result from the regular pattern of growing seasons in food production. It can also be influenced by other seasonal factors like school fees, the availability of work and income, migration, and holidays that involve large expenses.

=== Agency ===
Agency refers to the capacity of individuals or groups to make their own decisions about what foods they eat, what foods they produce, how that food is produced, processed, and distributed within food systems, and their ability to engage in processes that shape food system policies and governance. This term shares similar values to those of another important concept, Food sovereignty.

=== Sustainability ===
Sustainability refers to the long-term ability of food systems to provide food security and nutrition in a way that does not compromise the economic, social, and environmental bases that generate food security and nutrition for future generations.

== Causes of food insecurity ==
Since 2000, global food and agricultural supply have been exposed to a sequence of shocks, including extreme weather events, pandemics, conflicts, financial crises, and sharp increases in energy and fertilizer prices. These shocks have repeatedly disrupted production, trade flows and prices, raising concerns about the capacity of global food markets to ensure stable access to food, particularly for net food-importing countries and vulnerable populations.

=== High food prices ===
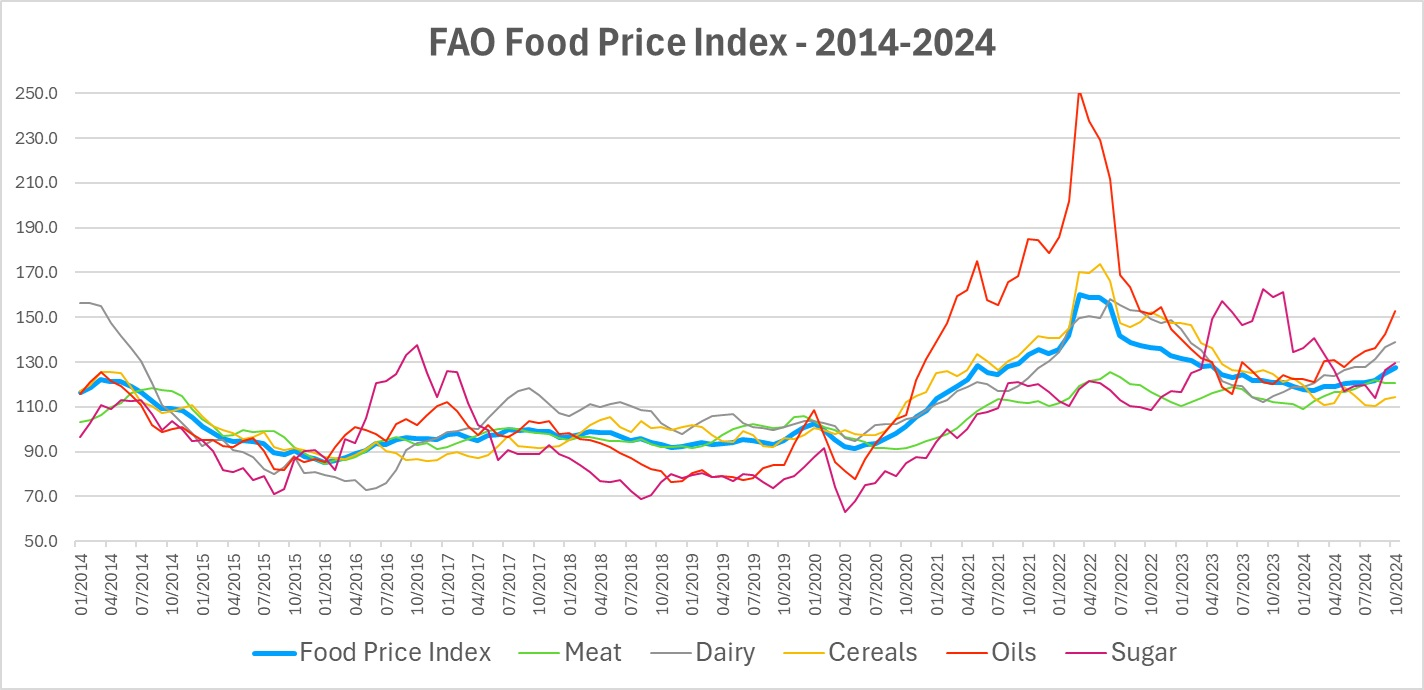
Food Price Index with 5 major commodities groups – 2014–2024 Food Price Index Meat Dairy Cereals Oils Sugar

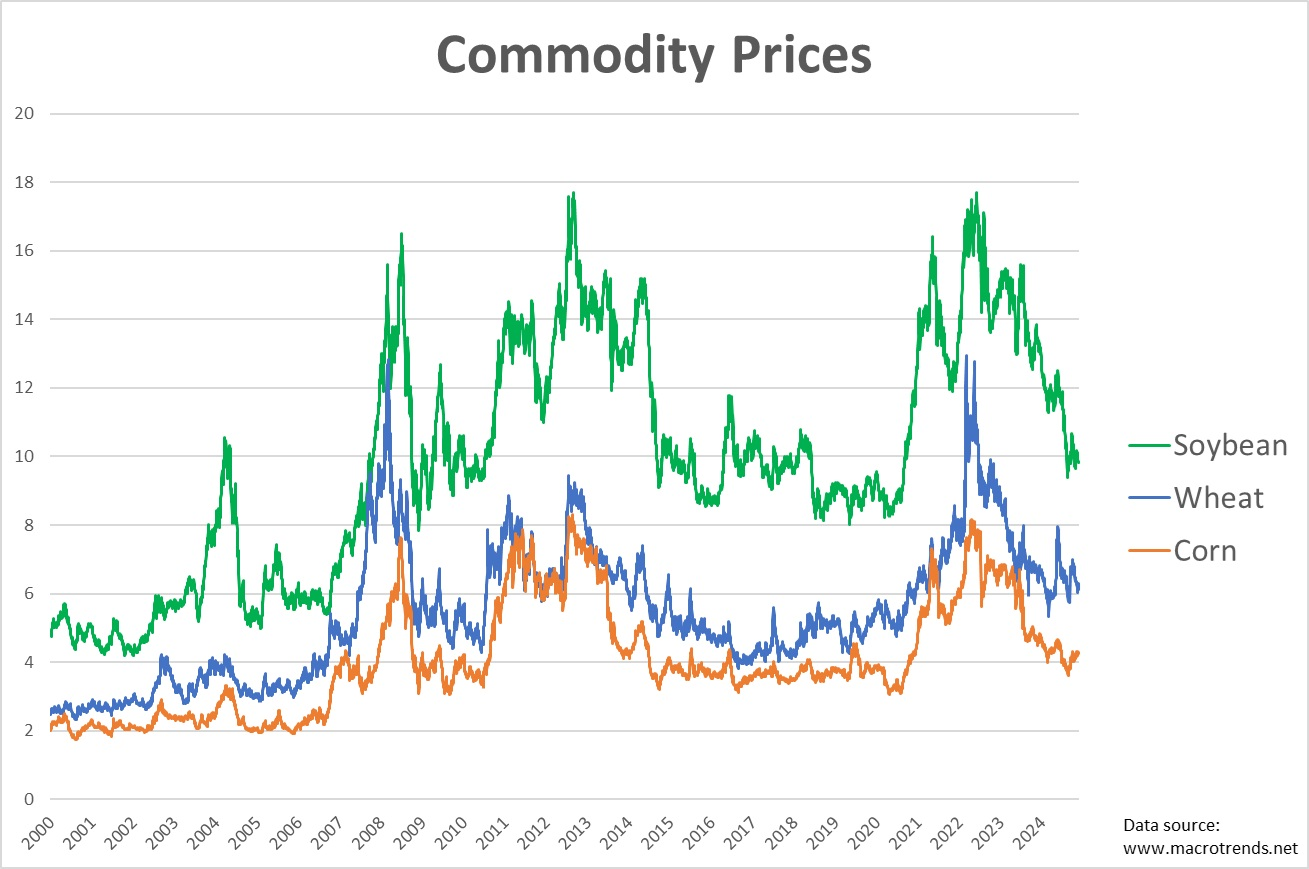
Prices of soybean, wheat and corn – 2000–2024 Soybeans Wheat Maize

During 2022 and 2023 there were food crises in several regions as indicated by rising food prices. In 2022, the world experienced significant food price inflation along with major food shortages in several regions. Sub-Saharan Africa, Iran, Sri Lanka, Sudan and Iraq were most affected. Prices of wheat, maize, oil seeds, bread, pasta, flour, cooking oil, sugar, eggs, chickpeas and meat increased. Many factors contributed to the world food crisis. These include supply chain disruptions due to the COVID-19 pandemic, the Global energy crisis (2021–2023), the Russian invasion of Ukraine, and floods and heatwaves during 2021 (which destroyed key American and European crops). Droughts were also a factor; in early 2022, some areas of Spain and Portugal lost 60–80% of their crops due to widespread drought.

Even before the Russian invasion of Ukraine, food prices were already at a record high. 82 million East Africans and 42 million West Africans faced acute food insecurity in 2021. By the end of 2022, more than 8 million Somalis were in need of food assistance. In February 2022, the Food and Agriculture Organization (FAO) reported a 20% rise in food prices since February 2021. The war further pushed this increase to 40% in March 2022 but was reduced to 18% by January 2023. But the FAO warned that inflation of food prices would continue in many countries.

==== Pandemics and disease outbreaks ====
Global hunger remained virtually unchanged from 2021 to 2022 but is still far above pre-COVID-19-pandemic levels.

The World Food Programme has stated that pandemics such as the COVID-19 pandemic risk undermining the efforts of humanitarian and food security organizations to maintain food security. The International Food Policy Research Institute expressed concerns that the increased connections between markets and the complexity of food and economic systems could cause disruptions to food systems during the COVID-19 pandemic, specifically affecting the poor.

The Ebola outbreak in 2014 led to increases in the prices of staple foods in West Africa. Stringent lockdowns, travel restrictions, and disruptions to labor forces resulted in bottlenecks affecting the production and distribution of goods. Notably, the food supply chain experienced significant disruptions as the pandemic strained logistics, labor availability, and demand patterns. While progress in combating COVID-19 has provided some relief, the pandemic's lasting effects persist, including shifts in consumer behavior and the ongoing necessity for health and safety measures.

==== Fossil fuel dependence ====
World population supported with and without synthetic nitrogen fertilizers

Between 1950 and 1984, as the Green Revolution transformed agriculture around the globe, world grain production increased by 250%. The energy for the Green Revolution was provided by fossil fuels in the form of fertilizers (natural gas), pesticides (oil), and hydrocarbon-fueled irrigation.

Natural gas is a major feedstock for the production of ammonia, via the Haber process, for use in fertilizer production. The development of synthetic nitrogen fertilizer has significantly supported global population growth — it has been estimated that almost half the people on Earth are currently fed as a result of synthetic nitrogen fertilizer use.

==== Agricultural diseases ====
Diseases affecting livestock or crops can have devastating effects on food availability especially if there are no contingency plans in place. For example, Ug99, a lineage of wheat stem rust, which can cause up to 100% crop losses, is present in wheat fields in several countries in Africa and the Middle East and is predicted to spread rapidly through these regions and possibly further afield, potentially causing a wheat production disaster that would affect food security worldwide. As of 2025, the Avian Flu has plagued the U.S. poultry industry, resulting in rapidly increasing egg prices for consumers and farmers unable to keep up with demand. U.S. Department of Agriculture (USDA), looks for solutions to combat increasing prices and the spread of pathogenic avian influenza (HPAI). Proposed solutions include, increasing investments in biosecurity to stop the spread of HPAI, extending relief to poultry farmers impacted, and removing unnecessary regulatory burdens to expand the commercial market for eggs.

==== Disruption in global food supplies due to war ====
The Russian invasion of Ukraine has disrupted global food supplies. The conflict has severely impacted food supply chains with noteworthy effects on production, sourcing, manufacturing, processing, logistics, and significant shifts in demand among nations reliant on imports from Ukraine. The European Union's imposition of sanctions on Russia has added complexity to trade relations. In Asia and the Pacific, many of those regions' countries depend on the importation of basic food staples such as wheat and also fertilizer, with nearly 1.1 billion lacking a healthy diet caused by poverty and ever-increasing food prices.

Shipping traffic through the Strait of Hormuz, a major maritime choke point, has been largely blocked by Iran since 28 February 2026. In October 2026, the United Nations warned that disruptions to maritime trade through the Strait of Hormuz were increasing energy, fertilizer and transportation costs and could worsen food insecurity beyond the Middle East. UN Women estimated that, under a moderate scenario, an additional 11.7 million women and girls in 28 countries could become food insecure by the end of 2026.

=== Environmental degradation and overuse ===
==== Land degradation ====
Intensive farming often leads to a vicious cycle of exhaustion of soil fertility and a decline of agricultural yields. Other causes of land degradation include for example deforestation, overgrazing, and over-exploitation of vegetation for use. Approximately 40 percent of the world's agricultural land is seriously degraded.

While the Green Revolution was critical in supporting a larger population through the mid-1900s to now by increasing crop yields, it has also resulted in environmental degradation particularly through land use, soil degradation, and deforestation. Over-farming of agricultural land due to the Green Revolution has caused contamination and erosion of soil, and a reduction in biodiversity due to pesticide usage (as well as deforestation). Malnutrition rates and food insecurity could increase again as land and water resources are depleted.

==== Water scarcity ====
Regionally, Sub-Saharan Africa has the largest number of water-stressed countries of any place on the globe, as of an estimated 800 million people who live in Africa, 300 million live in a water-stressed environment. It is estimated that by 2030, 75 million to 250 million people in Africa will be living in areas of high water stress, which will likely displace anywhere between 24 million and 700 million people as conditions become increasingly unlivable. Because the majority of Africa remains dependent on an agricultural lifestyle and 80 to 90 percent of all families in rural Africa rely upon producing their food, water scarcity translates to a loss of food security.

==== Overfishing ====
The overexploitation of fish stocks can pose serious risks to food security. Risks can be posed both directly by overexploitation of food fish and indirectly through overexploitation of the fish that those food fish depend on for survival. In 2022 the United Nations called attention "considerably negative impact" on food security of the fish oil and fishmeal industries in West Africa.

=== Food loss and waste ===
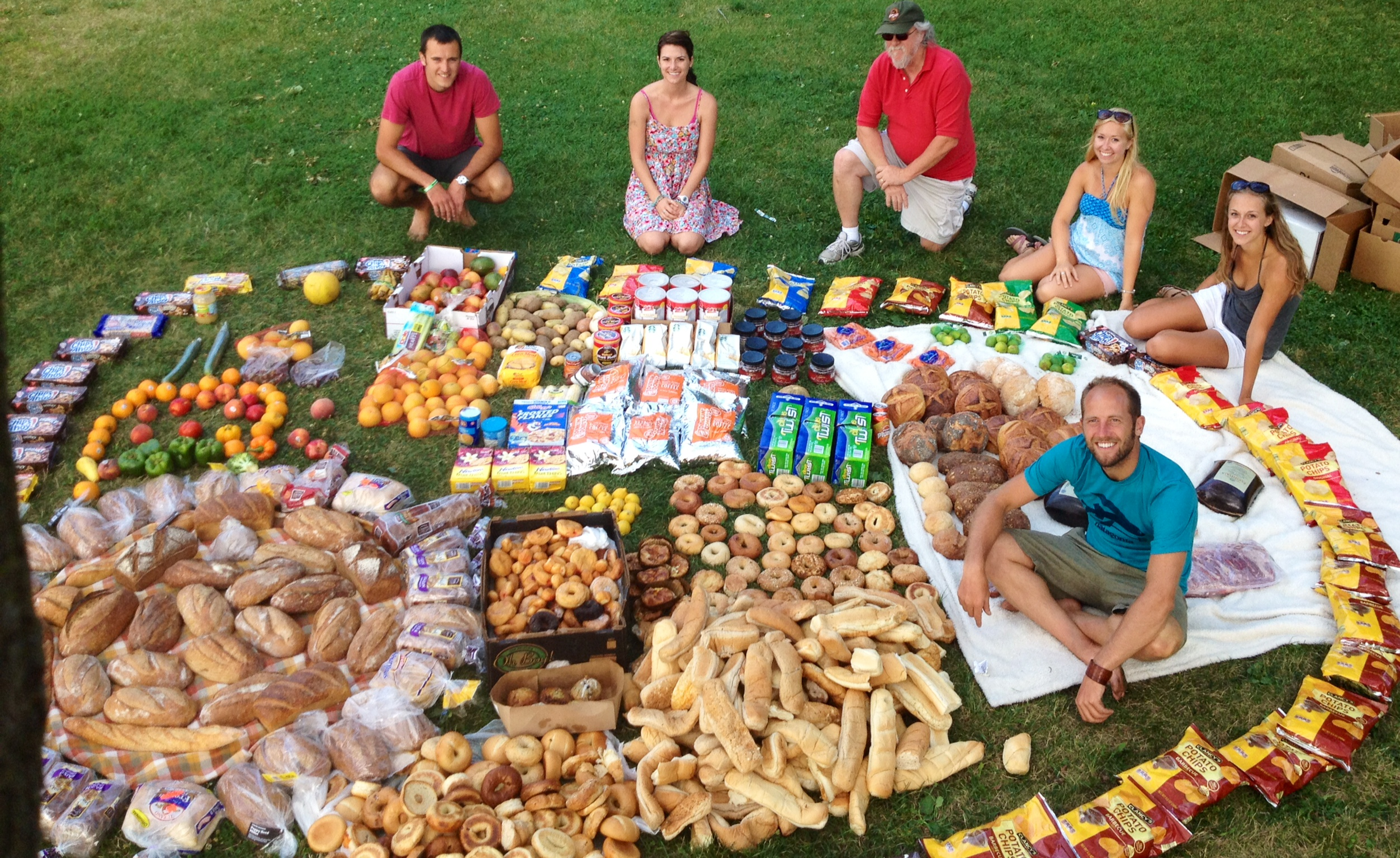
Food recovered by food waste critic Robin Greenfield in Madison, Wisconsin, from two days of recovery from dumpsters

Food waste may be diverted for alternative human consumption when economic variables allow for it. In the 2019 edition of the State of Food and Agriculture, FAO asserted that food loss and waste have potential effects on the four pillars of food security. However, the links between food loss and waste reduction and food security are complex, and positive outcomes are not always certain. Reaching acceptable levels of food security and nutrition inevitably implies certain levels of food loss and waste. Maintaining buffers to ensure food stability requires a certain amount of food to be lost or wasted. At the same time, ensuring food safety involves discarding unsafe food, which then is counted as lost or wasted, while higher-quality diets tend to include more highly perishable foods.

How the impacts on the different dimensions of food security play out and affect the food security of different population groups depends on where in the food supply chain the reduction in losses or waste takes place as well as on where nutritionally vulnerable and food-insecure people are located geographically.

=== Climate change ===
In 2023, climate change significantly impacted food security, with extreme weather events being primary drivers in 18 countries, affecting over 77 million people. The year marked the hottest on record, leading to severe climatic disturbances that disrupted agriculture, damaged crops, and decreased food availability. A 2026 joint report by the FAO and the World Meteorological Organization (WMO) further highlights a critical temperature threshold: once temperatures exceed 25°C, crop yields begin to decline significantly, with lasting repercussions on harvests and food prices that can persist for up to a year. These compounding pressures underline the crucial need for urgent global action to adapt to and mitigate climate impacts to protect food sources. Recent climate modeling suggests that, even when accounting for farmer adaptation, global yields of calories from six major staple crops are projected to be 24% lower by 2100 under a high-emissions scenario than they would be without climate change.

=== Compounding factors ===
Vulnerability to food insecurity can be increased by exposure to multiple, often simultaneous hazards that create complex emergencies, which ultimately challenge established risk management approaches. For example in 2020, East Africa faced a “triple threat” of the COVID-19 pandemic, flooding and desert locusts, creating a complex emergency that reactive disaster management practices struggled to address The compounding effects of these simultaneous crises led to a 20% increase in acute food insecurity in the region.Similarly, Cyclone Idai, which struck Southern Africa in 2019, did not just destroy 780,000 hectares of crops on impact, but it also triggered cholera outbreaks and created conditions for increased pest infestations, affecting 3 million people across Mozambique, Zimbabwe and Malawi.20 The interaction between these different types of crises created effects that exceeded what any single hazard might have produced.

== Effects of food insecurity ==
=== Social and economic impacts ===
Famine and hunger are both rooted in food insecurity. Chronic food insecurity translates into a high degree of vulnerability to famine and hunger; ensuring food security presupposes the elimination of that vulnerability.

Food insecurity can force individuals to undertake risky economic activities such as prostitution.

The International Monetary Fund cautioned in September 2022 that "the impact of increasing import costs for food and fertilizer for those extremely vulnerable to food insecurity will add $9 billion to their balance of payments pressures – in 2022 and 2023." This would deplete countries' foreign reserves as well as their capacity to pay for food and fertilizer imports."

=== Stunting and chronic nutritional deficiencies ===
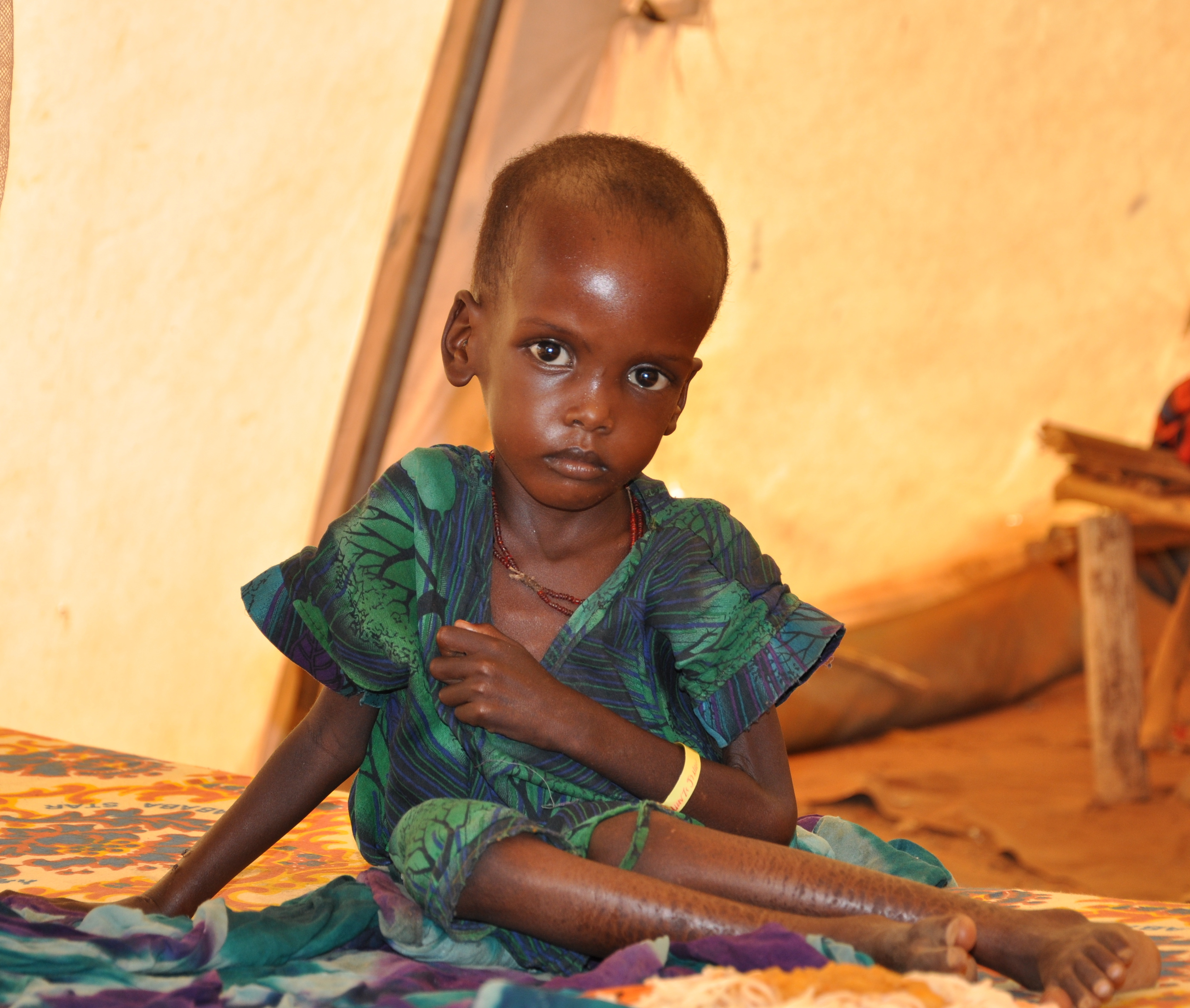
A child in Dolo Ado facing malnutrition

Many countries experience ongoing food shortages and distribution problems. These result in chronic and often widespread hunger amongst significant numbers of people. Human populations can respond to chronic hunger and malnutrition by decreasing body size, known in medical terms as stunting or stunted growth. This process starts in utero if the mother is malnourished and continues through approximately the third year of life. It leads to higher infant and child mortality, but at rates far lower than during famines. Once stunting has occurred, improved nutritional intake after the age of about two years is unable to reverse the damage. Severe malnutrition in early childhood often leads to defects in cognitive development. It, therefore, creates a disparity a between children who did not experience severe malnutrition and those who experience it.

Worldwide, the prevalence of child stunting was 21.3 percent in 2019, or 144 million children. Central Asia, Eastern Asia, and the Caribbean have the largest rates of reduction in the prevalence of stunting and are the only subregions on track to achieve the 2025 and 2030 stunting targets. Between 2000 and 2019, the global prevalence of child stunting declined by one-third.

Data from the 2021 FAO SOFI showed that in 2020, 22.0 percent (149.2 million) of children under 5 years of age were affected by stunting, 6.7 percent (45.4 million) were suffering from wasting and 5.7 percent (38.9 million) were overweight. FAO warned that the figures could be even higher due to the effects of the COVID-19 pandemic.

Africa and Asia account for more than nine out of ten of all children with stunting, more than nine out of ten children with wasting, and more than seven out of ten children who are affected by being overweight worldwide.

=== Mental health outcomes ===
Food insecurity is one of the social determinants of mental health. A recent comprehensive systematic review showed that over 50 studies have shown that food insecurity is strongly associated with a higher risk of depression, anxiety, and sleep disorders. For depression and anxiety, food-insecure individuals have almost a threefold risk increase compared to food-secure individuals. Adolescents experiencing food insecurity are more likely to experience suicidal ideation, suicide planning and suicide attempts than those who are food-secure. This is more common in countries where food insecurity is less common, potentially because it indicates a reduced standard of living and low social standing within that country.

Individuals who are pregnant and suffer from HFI (Household Food Insecurity) have a higher likelihood of experiencing symptoms of depression and possibly anxiety. Data from 18 observational studies involving over 27,000 participants, the analysis found that pregnant individuals experiencing HFI had significantly higher odds of reporting depressive symptoms. While the association with anxiety symptoms was noted, there was insufficient data for a full meta-analysis. The prevalence of HFI among pregnant individuals ranged from 12.6% to 62.1%. Depressive symptoms were reported in 18% to 49% of cases, while anxiety symptoms ranged from 23% to 34%.

== Approaches to food security ==
=== Agrifood systems resilience ===
Resilient agrifood systems can achieve food security. The resilience of agrifood systems refers to the capacity over time of agrifood systems, in the face of any disruption, to sustainably ensure availability of and access to sufficient, safe and nutritious food for all, and sustain the livelihoods of agrifood systems' actors. Truly resilient agrifood systems must have a robust capacity to prevent, anticipate, absorb, adapt and transform in the face of any disruption, with the functional goal of ensuring food security and nutrition for all and decent livelihoods and incomes for agrifood systems' actors. Such resilience addresses all dimensions of food security, but focuses specifically on stability of access and sustainability, which ensure food security in both the short and the long term. Resilience-building involves preparing for disruptions, particularly those that cannot be anticipated, in particular through: diversity in domestic production, in imports, and in supply chains; robust food transport networks; and guaranteed continued access to food for all.

The FAO finds that there are six pathways to follow towards food systems transformation:

1. integrating humanitarian, development and peacebuilding policies in conflict-affected areas;
2. scaling up climate resilience across food systems;
3. strengthening resilience of the most vulnerable to economic adversity;
4. intervening along the food supply chains to lower the cost of nutritious foods;
5. tackling poverty and structural inequalities, ensuring interventions are pro-poor and inclusive; and
6. strengthening food environments and changing consumer behaviour to promote dietary patterns with positive impacts on human health and the environment.

=== Approaches by FAO ===
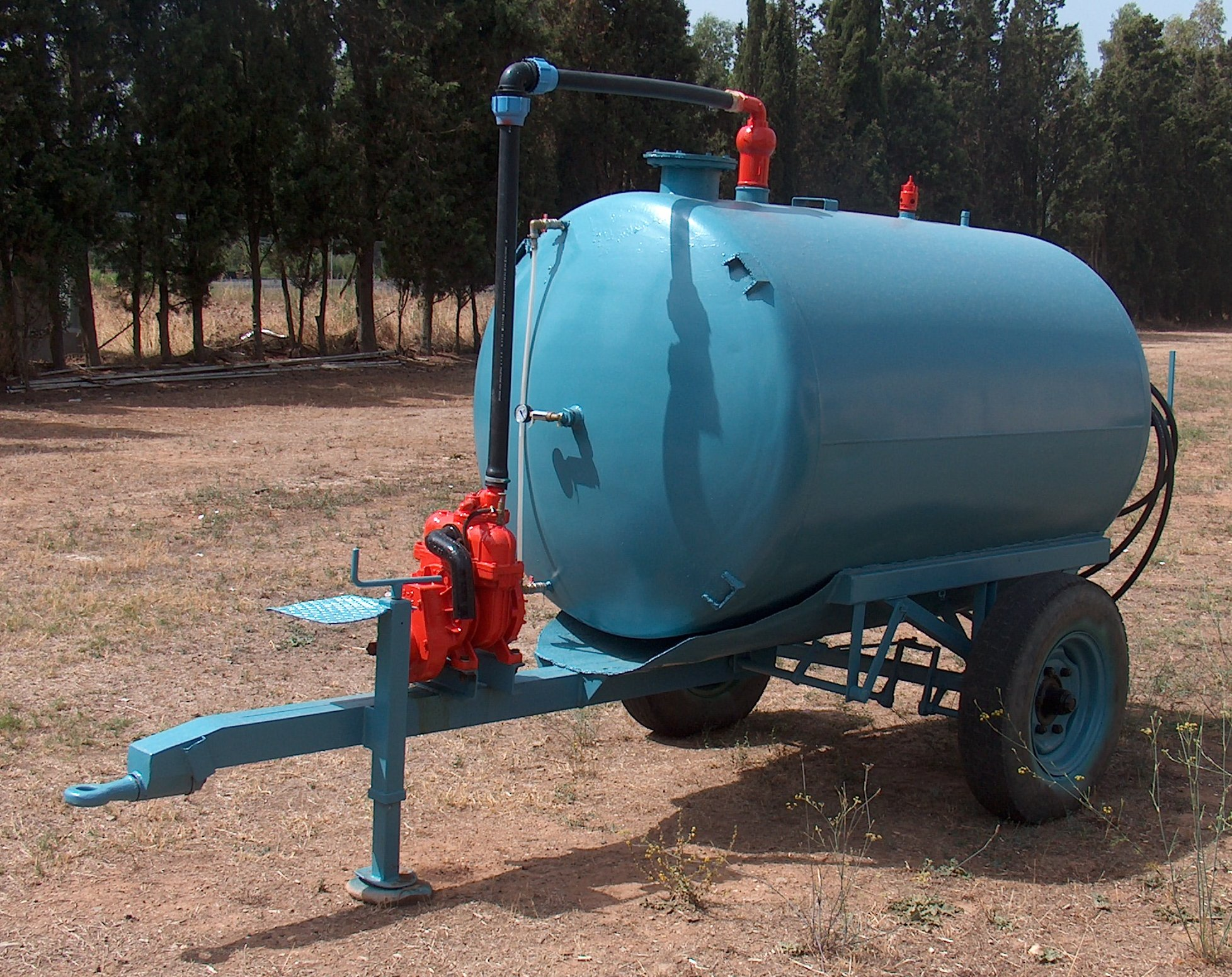
A liquid manure spreader is used to increase agricultural productivity.

Over the last decade, the Food and Agriculture Organization (FAO) has proposed a "twin track" approach to fight food insecurity that combines sustainable development and short-term hunger relief. Development approaches include investing in rural markets and rural infrastructure. In general, FAO proposes the use of public policies and programs that promote long-term economic growth that will benefit the poor. To obtain short-term food security, vouchers for seeds, fertilizer, or access to services could promote agricultural production. The use of conditional or unconditional food or cash transfers is another approach promoted by FAO. Conditional transfers may include school feeding programs, while unconditional transfers could include general food distribution, emergency food aid or cash transfers. A third approach is the use of subsidies as safety nets to increase the purchasing power of households. FAO has stated that "approaches should be human rights-based, target the poor, promote gender equality, enhance long-term resilience and allow sustainable graduation out of poverty."

FAO has noted that some countries have been successful in fighting food insecurity and decreasing the number of people suffering from undernourishment. Bangladesh is an example of a country that has met the Millennium Development Goal hunger target. The FAO credited growth in agricultural productivity and macroeconomic stability for the rapid economic growth in the 1990s that resulted in an increase in food security. Irrigation systems were established through infrastructure development programs.

In 2020, FAO deployed intense advocacy to make healthy diets affordable as a way to reduce global food insecurity and save vast sums in the process. The agency said that if healthy diets were to become the norm, almost all of the health costs that can currently be blamed on unhealthy diets (estimated to reach US$1.3 trillion a year in 2030) could be offset; and that on the social costs of greenhouse gas emissions that are linked to unhealthy diets, the savings would be even greater (US$1.7 trillion, or over 70 percent of the total estimated for 2030).

FAO urged governments to make nutrition a central plank of their agricultural policies, investment policies and social protection systems. It also called for measures to tackle food loss and waste, and to lower costs at every stage of food production, storage, transport, distribution and marketing. Another FAO priority is for governments to secure better access to markets for small-scale producers of nutritious foods.

The World Summit on Food Security, held in Rome in 1996, aimed to renew a global commitment to the fight against hunger. The conference produced two key documents, the Rome Declaration on World Food Security and the World Food Summit Plan of Action. The Rome Declaration called for the members of the United Nations to work to halve the number of chronically undernourished people on the Earth by 2015. The Plan of Action set several targets for government and non-governmental organizations for achieving food security, at the individual, household, national, regional, and global levels.

Another World Summit on Food Security took place at the FAO's headquarters in Rome between November 16 and 18, 2009.

FAO has also created a partnership that will act through the African Union's CAADP framework aiming to end hunger in Africa by 2025. It includes different interventions including support for improved food production, a strengthening of social protection and integration of the Right to Food into national legislation.

=== Approaches by WFP ===
The World Food Programme (WFP) is an agency of the United Nations that counters acute food insecurity with early-warning systems and emergency food or cash assistance to people whose lives or livelihoods are under threat. It simultaneously supports resilience building to meet future challenges, and efforts to address the structural drivers of conflict, which is responsible for most situations of acute food insecurity. In the face of climate hazards, environmental degradation, and increasingly extreme weather events, WFP offsets impacts through measures such as forecast-based financing.

Under the Food Assistance for Assets program, participants work on new infrastructure or learn new skills that will increase food security, in exchange for food. WFP also supports governments and other partners in improving emergency response capabilities and overall food security. This includes advising on stronger social protection systems, as well as managing the United Nations Humanitarian Air Service, Humanitarian Response Depot, and Logistics Cluster.

=== Improving agricultural productivity to benefit the rural poor ===
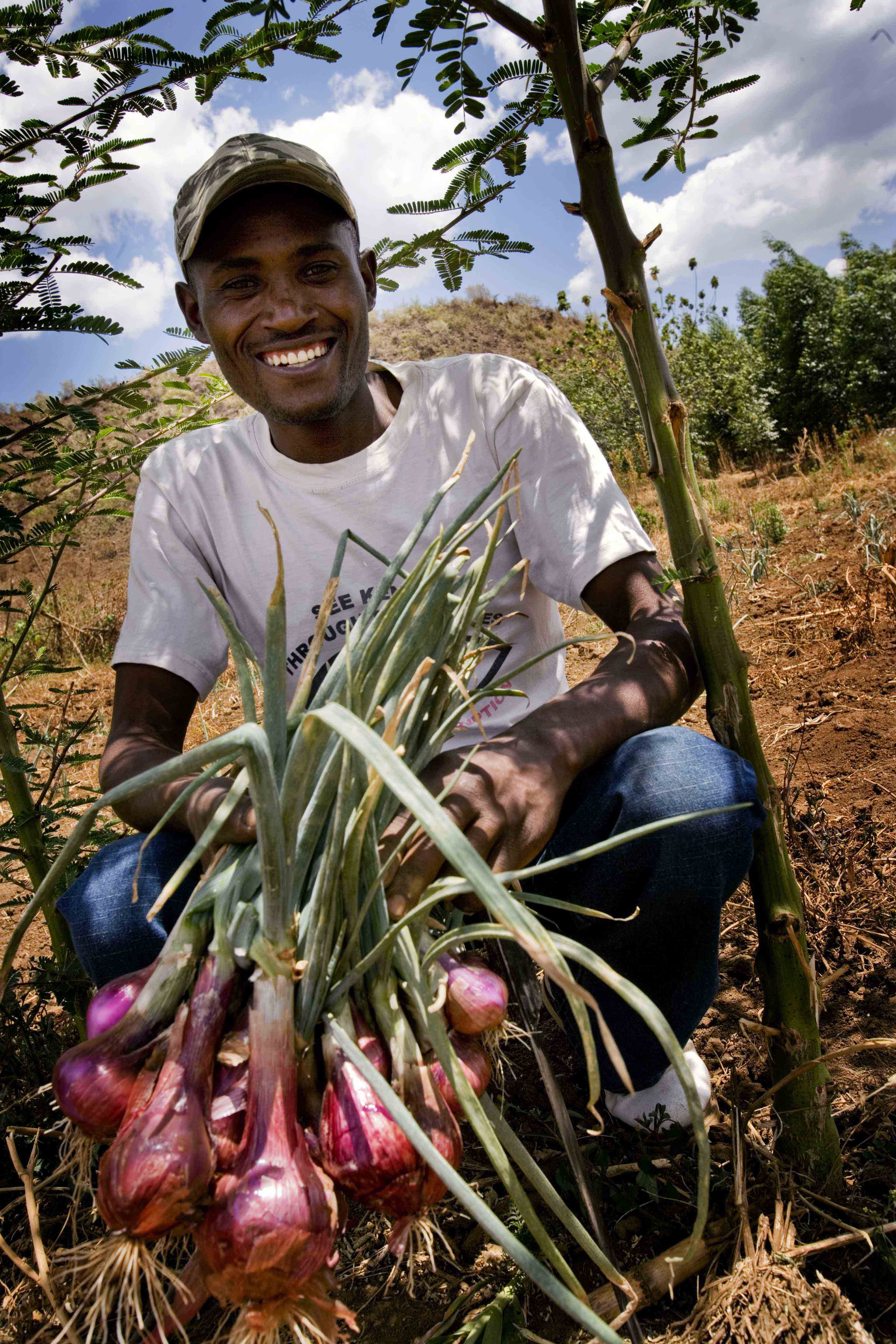
A farmer holding up onions he has grown on his farm near Gilgil, Kenya

According to the Comprehensive Assessment of Water Management in Agriculture, a major study led by the International Water Management Institute (IWMI), managing rainwater and soil moisture more effectively, and using supplemental and small-scale irrigation, hold the key to helping the greatest number of poor people. It has called for a new era of water investments and policies for upgrading rainfed agriculture that would go beyond controlling field-level soil and water to bring new freshwater sources through better local management of rainfall and runoff. Increased agricultural productivity enables farmers to grow more food, which translates into better diets and, under market conditions that offer a level playing field, into higher farm incomes.

The United States Agency for International Development (USAID) proposes several key steps to increasing agricultural productivity, which is in turn key to increasing rural income and reducing food insecurity. They include:

- Boosting agricultural science and technology. Current agricultural yields are insufficient to feed the growing populations. Eventually, the rising agricultural productivity drives economic growth.
- Securing property rights and access to finance
- Enhancing human capital through education and improved health
- Conflict prevention and resolution mechanisms and democracy and governance based on principles of accountability and transparency in public institutions and the rule of law are basic to reducing vulnerable members of society.

=== Development aid activities ===
In September 2022, the United States announced a $2.9 billion contribution to aid efforts of global food security at the UN General Assembly in New York. $2 billion will go to the U.S. Agency for International Development for its humanitarian assistance efforts around the world, along with $140 million for the agency's Feed the Future Initiative. The United States Department of Agriculture will receive $220 million to fund eight new projects, all of which is expected to benefit nearly a million children residing in food-insecure countries in Africa and East Asia. The USDA will also receive another $178 million for seven international development projects to support U.S. government priorities on four continents.

In April 2012, the Food Assistance Convention was signed, the world's first legally binding international agreement on food aid. The May 2012 Copenhagen Consensus recommended that efforts to combat hunger and malnutrition should be the first priority for politicians and private sector philanthropists looking to maximize the effectiveness of aid spending. They put this ahead of other priorities, like the fight against malaria and AIDS.

=== Alternative diets ===
Food security could be increased by integrating alternative foods that can be grown in compact environments, that are resilient to pests and disease, and that do not require complex supply chains. Foods meeting these criteria include algae, mealworm, and fungi-derived mycoprotein. While unpalatable on their own to most people, such raw ingredients might be processed into more palatable foods.

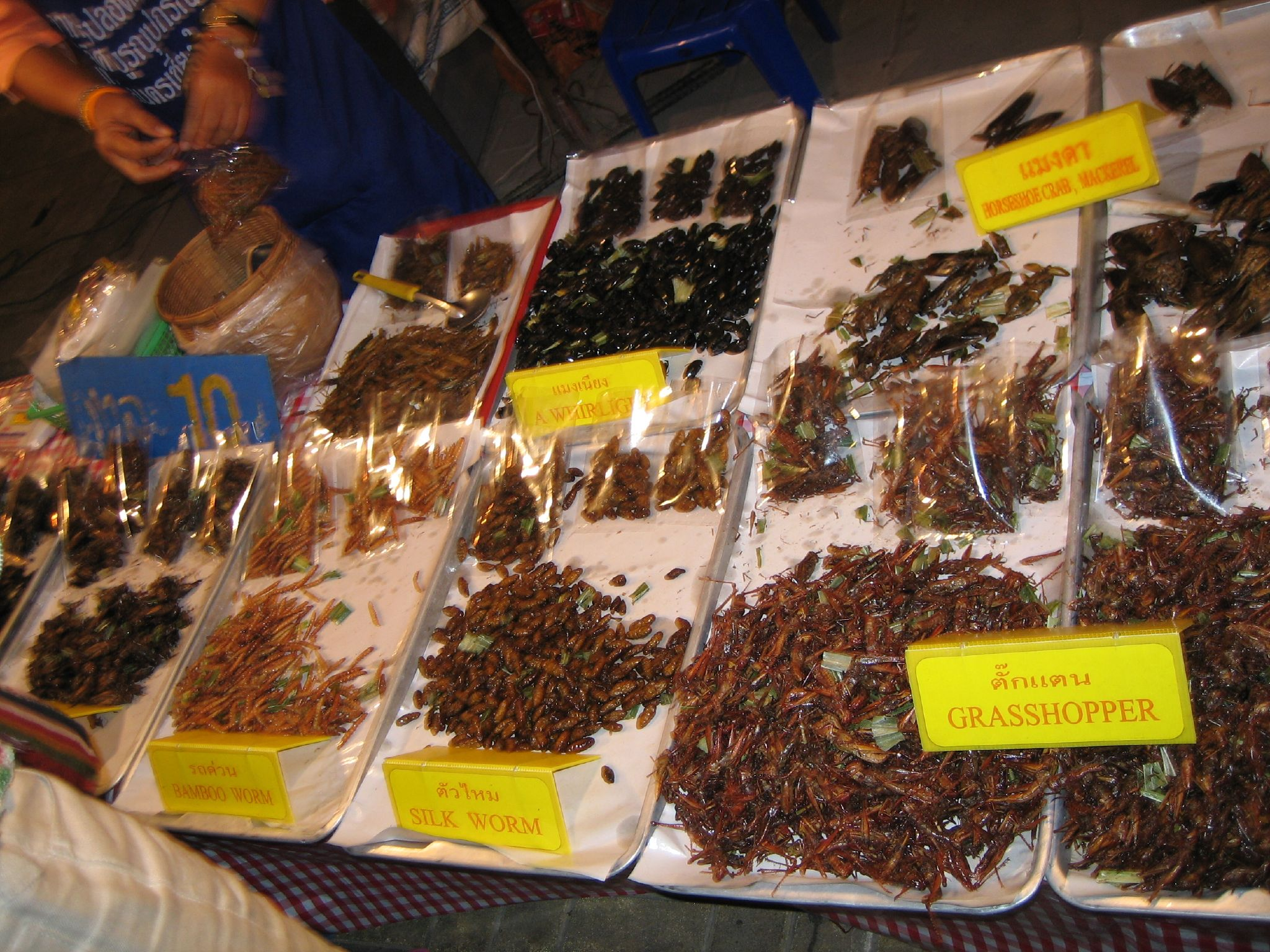
Many different insects are edible; Grasshoppers, silkworms, and bamboo worms (some of the insects in the picture) are just a few of the options.

With over 2000 identified edible insects, there are many options for consumption. Insects may provide a sustainable option for protein sources containing 13-77% protein by dry weight. The energy obtained by eating insects can be similar to other food sources like beef and chicken depending on what kind of insect is eaten. Insects may be a sustainable commercial farming option to support populations struggling with food security due to their nutrition and farming capacities, taking less room to cultivate than other protein sources.

=== Food Justice Movement ===
The Food Justice Movement is a multifaceted movement with relevance to the issue of food security. It has been described as a movement about social-economic and political problems in connection to environmental justice, improved nutrition and health, and activism. Today, a growing number of individuals and minority groups are embracing the Food Justice due to the perceived increase in hunger within nations such as the United States as well as the amplified effect of food insecurity on many minority communities, particularly the Black and Latino communities.

=== Controlled-environment agriculture ===
Controlled-environment agriculture (CEA) is a system that uses hydroponics and vertical farming to provide a solution to water scarcity and food insecurity, especially in arid regions like the Mediterranean. This system uses significantly less water and land compared to traditional farming making them highly efficient to areas with limited resources. Regions with strong infrastructure and skilled labor are particularly well-suited for CEA, which can enhance local food production and contribute to long-term food security.

=== Digital technologies ===
The adaptation of digital technologies such as artificial intelligence, blockchain, and the Internet of Things (IoT) in agriculture enable farmers to access real-time data, optimize resource use, and improve decision-making, leading to increased productivity and reduced environmental impact. For instance, precision agriculture tools allow for targeted application of inputs, minimizing waste and preserving natural resources.

== By country ==
=== Afghanistan ===
In Afghanistan, about 35.5% of households are food insecure (as of 2018). The prevalence of underweight, stunting, and wasting in children under five years of age is also very high. In October 2021, more than half of Afghanistan's 39 million people faced an acute food shortage. On 11 November 2021, Human Rights Watch reported that Afghanistan is facing widespread famine due to collapsed economy and broken banking system. The UN World Food Program has also issued multiple warnings of worsening food insecurity. As of 2025 it is estimated that 22.9 million Afghans, that is more than half of the population, is in need of humanitarian aid, this includes 12.6 million at "crisis" or "emergency" levels of acute food insecurity.

=== Australia ===
In 2012, the Australian Bureau of Statistics (ABS) conducted a survey measuring nutrition, which included food security. It was reported that 4% of Australian households were food insecure. 1.5% of those households were severely food insecure. Additionally, the Australian Institute of Family Studies (AIFS), reported that certain demographics are more vulnerable to being food insecure; such as indigenous, elderly, regional, and single-parent households. Financial issues were cited as the main cause of food insecurity.

Climate change may present future challenges for Australia regarding food security, as Australia already experiences extreme weather. Australia's history in biofuel production and use of fertilizers has reduced the quality of the land. Increased extreme weather is projected to affect crops, livestock, and soil quality. Wheat production, one of Australia's main food exports, is projected to decrease by 9.2% by 2030. Beef production is also expected to fall by 9.6%.

=== Bangladesh ===
In 2023, approximately 11.9 million people in Bangladesh faced high levels of acute food insecurity. Contributing factors include extreme weather events, economic shocks, and high levels of domestic food inflation. The situation is projected to deteriorate, with the number of people in IPC Phase 3 or above likely to increase to 16.5 million (22% of the analyzed population) between April and October 2024.

=== Brazil ===
In 2023, approximately 27.6% of Brazilian households, equating to 21.6 million homes, experienced some level of food insecurity. This included 18.2% facing mild food insecurity, 5.3% moderate, and 4.1% severe.

On an individual level, remarkably severe food insecurity saw a significant decline, dropping from 8% of the population in 2022 to 1.2% in 2023 according to the Brazilian government. This reduction lifted 14.7 million people out of severe hunger conditions.

=== Canada ===
Since 2005, Canada has monitored the level of food insecurity by province and territory. Rates of food insecurity in Canada ranged from 11.1% in Québec to 57% in Nunavut as of a 2017-2018 survey. Of the 57% of household affected by food insecurity in Nunavut, almost half of them are severely food insecure. These rates of food security equal 4.4 million people, of which 1.2 million were under the age of 18. Some common co-occurring conditions were households with lower incomes, single-income, and renting rather than owning their home. Food insecurity is more prevalent in households that receive social assistance, Employment Insurance, and Worker's Compensation, as well as in pension-reliant homes. People who identified as Indigenous or Black also face higher rates of food insecurity than those who identify otherwise.

Food insecurity has been associated with a poorer quality of diet including a significant difference in micronutrient intake which varies across age and sex. In a 2015 study, the caloric intake was higher in severely food insecure households however with fewer micronutrients indicating a shift towards less nutrient-dense food options. In addition to micronutrient deficiencies across all age groups, food insecurity is correlated with higher rates of chronic disease biomarkers. In Canada, food insecurity is associated with worse mental health and higher mortality rates.

=== China ===
The persistence of wet markets has been described as "critical for ensuring urban food security," particularly in Chinese cities. The influence of wet markets on urban food security includes food pricing and physical accessibility.

Despite initial public resistance, China is advancing the development and potential commercialization of GM crops, such as soybeans and maize, to bolster domestic production and reduce dependence on imports.

Calling food waste "shameful", General Secretary of the Chinese Communist Party, Xi Jinping, launched the Clean Plate campaign. Xi stressed that there should be a sense of crisis regarding food security. In 2020, China witnessed a rise in food prices, due to the COVID-19 outbreak and mass flooding that wiped out the country's crops, which made food security a priority for Xi. As part of its goals of ensuring food security, the Chinese Communist Party emphasizes agricultural research, including at the Chinese Academy of Sciences.

=== Democratic Republic of Congo ===
In the Democratic Republic of Congo (DRC), about 33% of households are food insecure, and nearly 60% in eastern provinces. Millions of DRC inhabitants are living below the poverty line, contributing to this widespread hunger in the country that in some cases is so severe, that families can't afford to eat everyday. A study showed the correlation of food insecurity and its negative effects on at-risk HIV adults in the Democratic Republic of Congo, exacerbating the vulnerability of these populations even further.

The state of food insecurity in the DRC has been long prevalent, but worsened greatly following the Congolese Wars (1996–1998; 1998–2003). In 2002, about 80% of the population lived below the poverty line, and more than 90% of the rural population had no easy access to safe drinking water. This contributed to the food insecurity of the nation, in which chronic infant malnutrition was over 45% for children under 5 years old. The nation's lack of access to markets, limited financial means, and low levels of food production have been other contributors to their poor levels of food security.

Furthermore, the nation has an influx of imported food products that are often of poor nutritional quality, but are placed at competitive prices that the nation can afford. This results in the majority of households turning to cheaper, high-calorie food products over more healthy, unaffordable, high-protein foods that are not as accessible to them. This then results in unbalanced and unhealthy diets that contribute to poor health outcomes for these populations. Furthermore, many urban areas are forced to turn to mainly consume bushmeat as their primary source of protein, because they cannot afford to access other types of safer, healthier and even more legal options.

=== India ===
Food security has been a major concern in India. In 2022, the Global Food Security Index ranked India at 68th out of the 113 major countries in terms of food security. In 2024, the Global Hunger Index ranked India at 105th out of 127 countries with a score of 27.3. According to the United Nations, there are nearly 195 million undernourished people in India that make up a quarter of the world's undernourished population. In addition, roughly 43% of children in India are chronically undernourished. Though the current nutritional standards meet 100% of daily food requirements, India lags far behind in terms of a quality protein intake at 10%; this shortcoming can be alleviated by making available protein-rich food products such as soybeans, lentils, meat, eggs, dairy, etc. more readily accessible and affordable for Indian citizens. The Human Rights Measurement Initiative finds that India is operating at only 56.8% of its capacity based its economic power to ensure its citizens have adequate food security.

=== Israel ===
Israel's Food Donation Encouragement Law was passed in 2018, and in 2024, the Knesset passed an amendment to the act which requires public institutions in Israel to donate their surplus food to nonprofit organizations serving people in need.

According to a report published by the charity Leket Israel in 2024, around 485,000 households in Israel experience food insecurity. Leket is a non-denominational Israeli food bank charity.

=== Mexico ===
Mexico has sought to ensure food security through its history. Yet, despite various efforts, Mexico continues to lack national food and nutrition strategies that secure food security for the people. As a large country of more than 100 million people, planning and executing social policies are complex tasks. Although Mexico has been expanding its food and nutrition programs that have been expected, and to some degree, have contributed to increases in health and nutrition, food security, particularly as it relates to obesity and malnutrition, still remains a relevant public health problem. Although food availability is not the issue, severe deficiencies in the accessibility of food contribute to insecurity.

=== Pakistan ===
According to the Integrated Food Security Phase Classification (ITC), Between April and October 2023, nearly 10.5 million people in Pakistan, or 29% of the analyzed population, were experiencing high levels of acute food insecurity. This includes approximately 2.1 million people in IPC Phase 4 (Emergency) and around 8.4 million in IPC Phase 3 (Crisis). The situation is projected to worsen, with 11.8 million people (32% of the analyzed population) likely to experience high levels of acute food insecurity between November 2023 and January 2024.

=== Singapore ===
Singapore's population increased from just over 3 million to around 5.7 million people (as of 2019). Following their significant increase in population, Singapore then faced a significant decrease in agricultural land (from 25% allocated land in 1965 to less than 1% in 2014) making food production rates decline drastically. Due to the minimal amount of agricultural output, Singapore imports about 90% of their food. Singapore was rated as the top country in affordability, availability, quality, and safety. These conditions contribute to a high rate of food secure individuals, about 92.5% of the population have experienced no food security concerns. A challenge with this structure is that importing food leaves the country's food supply chain vulnerable to price changes in the global food market from factors such as, disease (like Coronavirus) and climate change which can cause droughts and floods disrupting agriculture in countries like Thailand which Singapore relies on.

Singapore is implementing many different methods and techniques to increase internal agricultural output.

In 2019 the Singapore government launched the "30 by 30" program which aims to drastically reduce food insecurity through hydroponics and aquaculture.

=== South Africa ===
In South Africa, between a quarter and a third of households are food insecure. Following the COVID-19 lockdowns, child and household hunger have not decreased. In contrast, hunger has stabilized at a higher rate than pre-pandemic rates. This increase in hunger may be due to slow economic growth, low employment and a loss of government financial support following the pandemic. The social grants given by the government along with the child support grants, school food initiatives, and the Integrated Food Security and Nutrition Programme have all been influential in lowering the food insecurity rate particularly before the Coronavirus outbreak.

=== Sudan ===
Throughout 2024, the population of Sudan suffered from severe malnutrition and famine conditions as a result of the Sudanese civil war beginning in 2023, primarily in Darfur, Kordofan, and neighboring refugee-taking nations such as Chad. On 1 August, the Global Famine Review Committee released a report officially declaring that it was possible that IPC Phase 5 famine conditions were ongoing in North Darfur near Al-Fashir and there was a high risk of similar conditions throughout internally displaced persons (IDP) camps. Human rights groups said famine conditions in Sudan had been worsened by the Rapid Support Forces looting cities and destroying harvests, while the Sudanese army restricted humanitarian aid deliveries by blocking food shipments into RSF-controlled areas, severely limiting access to life-saving assistance.

The Sudan Doctors Union estimated in January 2025 that 522,000 children had died due to malnutrition. Additionally, the United Nations reported that, during the war, Sudan "endured a 500% increase in verified cases of killings, sexual violence and recruitment into armed groups." In September 2025, the United Nations' World Food Program reported that 24.6 million people suffered from acute hunger and 2 million faced famine or risk of famine. By November 2025, the conflict caused nearly 12 million people to be forcibly displaced, both inside Sudan and across its borders.

=== Syria ===
The 2025 hunger crisis in Syria is one of the country's worst humanitarian disasters, with over 14.5 million people facing food insecurity. A severe drought, the harshest in 36 years, slashed wheat production by 40%, while years of war, the 2023 earthquake, and the return of refugees devastated agriculture and infrastructure. Economic collapse, soaring food and fuel prices, and reduced subsidies left families unable to afford essentials, with basic food costs nine times higher than the minimum wage. Political instability after Assad's fall further disrupted supply chains and aid delivery, while international support waned; the World Food Programme reported a funding gap of $335 million. Despite reaching 1.5 million people monthly, relief efforts remain far below the scale of need, leaving millions at risk of famine and malnutrition.

=== United States ===
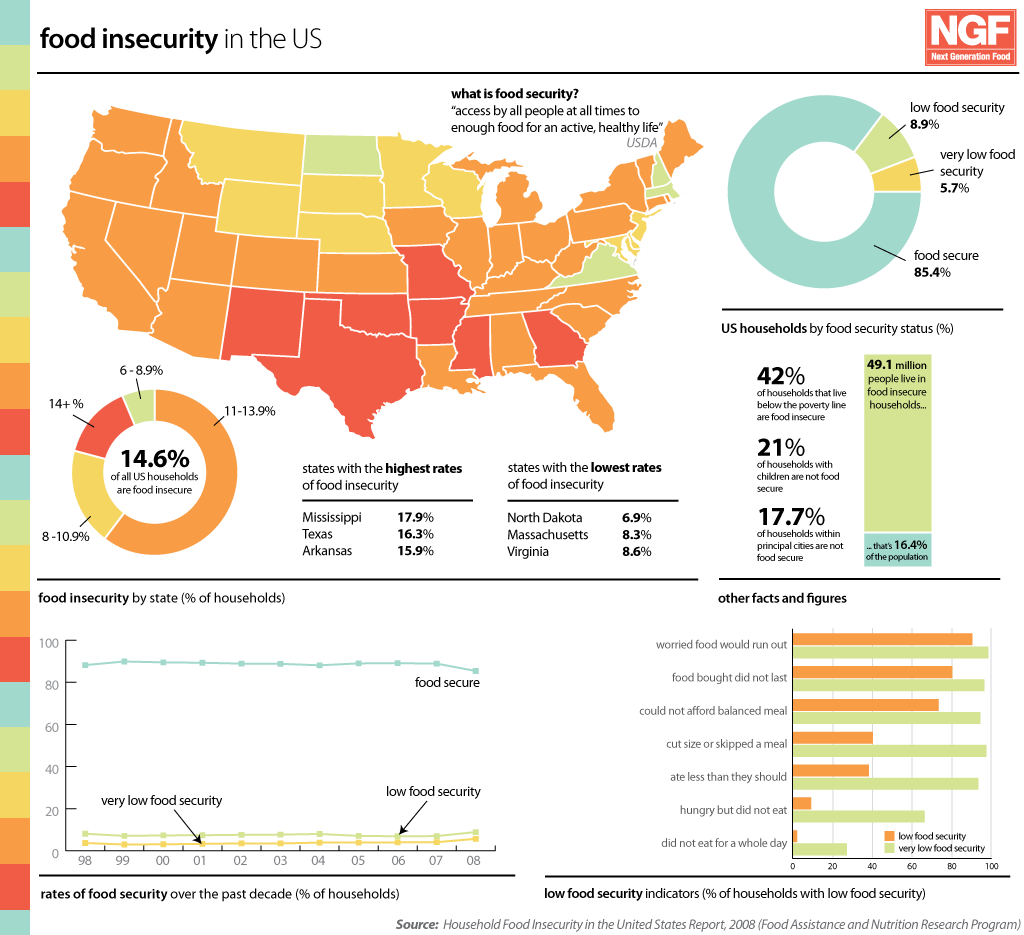
Infographic about food insecurity in the US in 2008

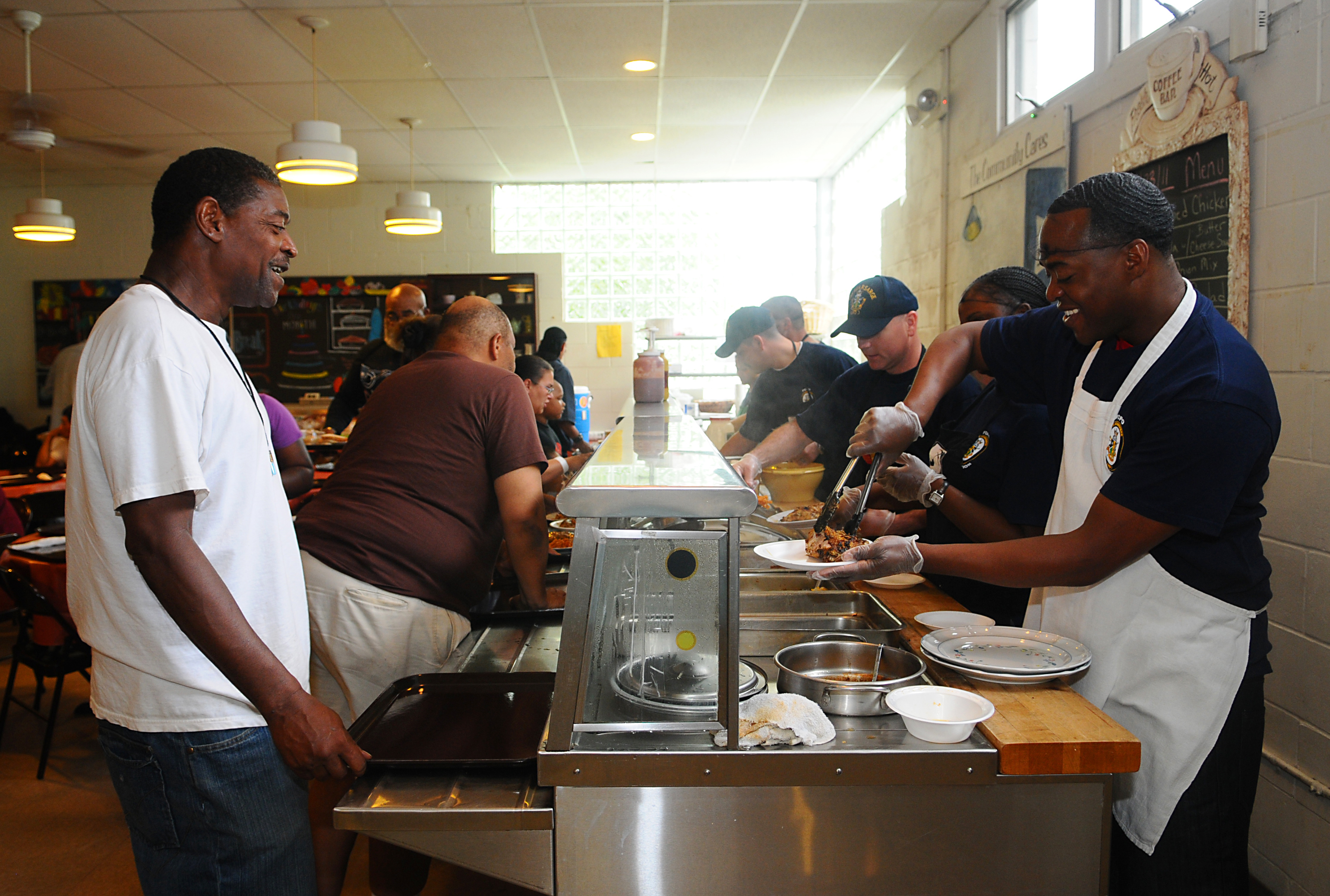
Members of the United States Navy serving hungry Americans at a soup kitchen in Red Bank, New Jersey, during a 2011 community service project

Food insecurity and hunger in the United States of America affects millions of Americans, including some who are middle class, or who are in households where all adults are in work. The United States produces far more food than it needs for domestic consumption; however, hunger within the U.S. is primarily caused by some Americans having insufficient money to buy food for themselves or their families. Additional causes of hunger and food insecurity include neighborhood deprivation and agricultural policy. Hunger is addressed by a mix of public and private food aid provision. Public interventions include changes to agricultural policy, the construction of supermarkets in underserved neighborhoods, investment in transportation infrastructure, and the development of community gardens. Private aid can be provided through examples such as food pantries, soup kitchens, food banks, and food rescue organizations.

Reliance on food banks has led to a rise in obesity and diabetes within the food insecure community. Many foods in food banks are highly processed and low in nutritional value leading to further health effects. One study showed 33% of American households visiting food pantries had diabetes. Food insecure individuals living in low-income communities experience higher rates of chronic disease, leading to healthcare costs and more financial hardships.

Historically, the U.S. was a world leader in reducing hunger both domestically and internationally. In the latter half of the twentieth century, other advanced economies in Europe and Asia began to overtake the U.S. in terms of reducing hunger among their own populations. In 2011, a report presented in the New York Times found that among 20 economies recognized as advanced by the International Monetary Fund and for which comparative rankings for food security were available, the U.S. was joint worst. Nonetheless, in March 2013, the Global Food Security Index ranked the U.S. number one for food affordability and overall food security. The Human Rights Measurement Initiative finds that the US is achieving 87.6% of what should be possible at their income level for fulfilling the right to food.

In 2024, 13.7 percent of U.S. households, about 18.3 million, were food insecure at some point during the year. Another 5.4 percent, about 7.2 million households, experienced very low food security. Neither prevalence estimate was statistically different from 2023. Surveys have consistently found much higher levels of food insecurity for students, with a 2019 study finding that over 40% of US undergraduate students experienced food insecurity. Indicators suggested the prevalence of food insecurity for US households approximately doubled during the COVID-19 pandemic, with an especially sharp rise for households with young children.

In 2023, data showed that undergraduates attending colleges and universities with a high percentage of minorities such as HBCUs, TCUs, and MSIs faced greater food insecurity compared to other institutions. Same date also showed high levels of needs being reported during COVID-19 pandemic in these types of institutes as well

=== Uganda ===
In 2022, 28% of Ugandan households experienced food insecurity. This insecurity has negative effects on HIV transmission and household stability.

Uganda faces challenges associated with food security related to agricultural soil management, forest destruction, and anthropogenic pressure on the land. This is an issue as agriculture is the main form of food acquisition in places such as Tororo and Busia. In these areas the 90% of families rely on farming so disruptions to their farming could increase their chances of economic instability and food insecurity. Many families report that lack of funds, disease, and lack of land, among other variables, are significant barriers to food security. In the wetland-associated system in Uganda, 93% of families are food insecure with 75% of inhabitants eating two meals and 8% eating only one meal a day. This may be made worse by socioeconomic factors like disease (HIV/AIDS), poverty, and agricultural reasons like land degradation or land management issues (regulation of food production using wetlands).

=== Yemen ===
Food insecurity is highly prevalent in Yemen, with 60% of the population being affected by agricultural decline. The Integrated Security Phase Classification system places 53% of Yemenis as at risk (36%) or as an emergency (17%). Between 23 and 30% of Yemenis must change their choice of food and compromise on the quality of their food to account for food shortages while 8 to 13% of Yemenis admit to decreasing the number of meals they eat. The state of nutrition is most dire for vulnerable populations like children who face developmental issues like stunting or wasting as a result of malnutrition. Over 462,000 Yemeni children are severely acutely malnourished which increases their risk of disease. In a 2019 study, children with severe acute malnutrition were reported to have an increased rate of measles, diarrhea, fever, and cough when compared to non-severely acutely malnourished children.

== Society and culture ==
=== Food security related UN days ===
October 16 has been chosen as World Food Day, in honour of the date FAO was founded in 1945. On this day, FAO hosts a variety of events at its headquarters in Rome and around the world, as well as seminars with UN officials.

=== Human rights approach ===
The United Nations (UN) recognized the Right to Food in the Declaration of Human Rights in 1948, and has since said that it is vital for the enjoyment of all other rights.

=== United Nations Goals ===
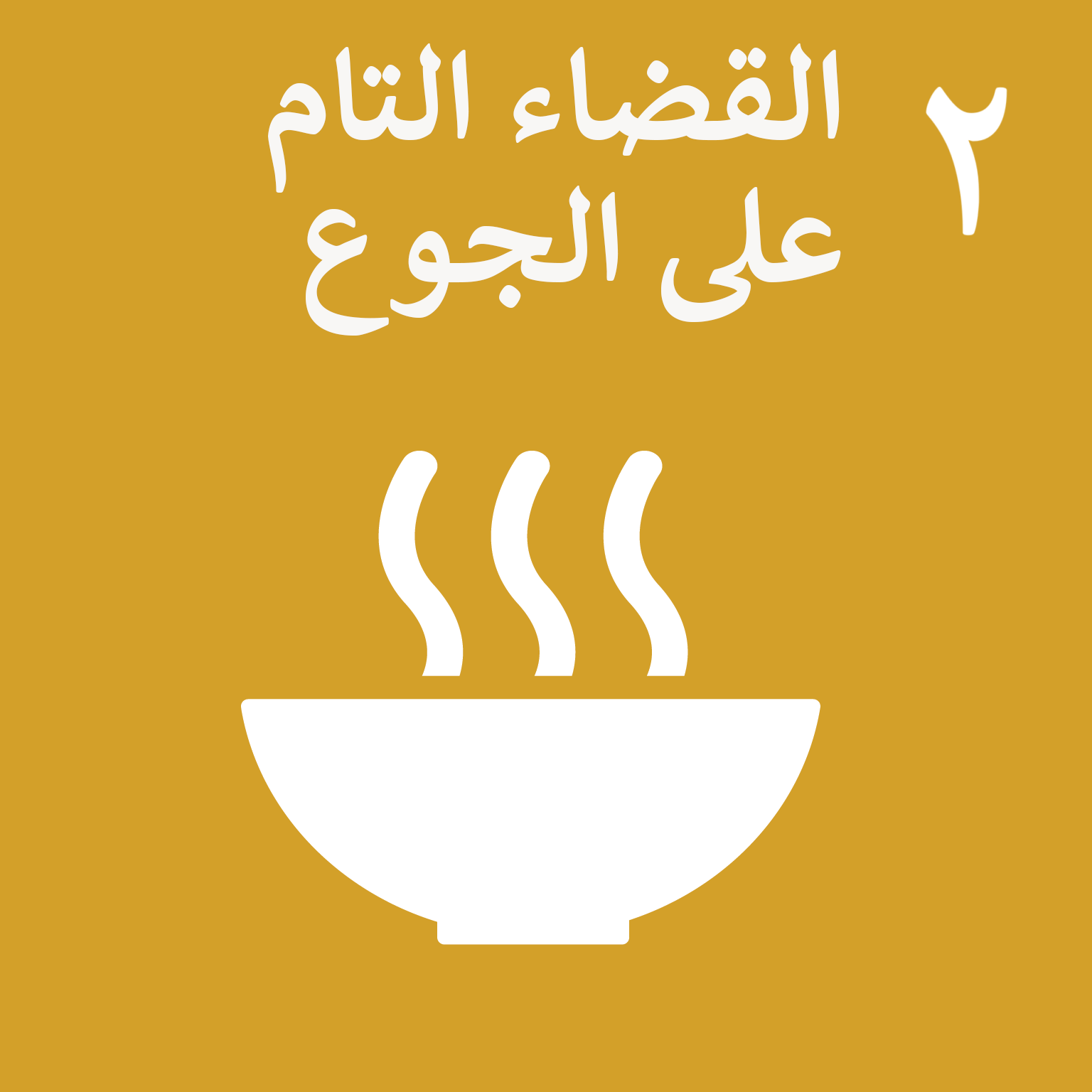
The Zero Hunger SDG, Goal 2 represented in Arabic. Goal 2 focuses on reducing hunger and poverty, as an international agreed upon goal and agenda.

The UN Millennium Development Goals were one of the initiatives aimed at achieving food security in the world. The first Millennium Development Goal states that the UN "is to eradicate extreme hunger and poverty" by 2015. The UN Special Rapporteur on the Right to Food, advocates for a multidimensional approach to food security challenges. This approach emphasizes the physical availability of food; the social, economic and physical access people have to food; and the nutrition, safety and cultural appropriateness or adequacy of food.

Multiple different international agreements and mechanisms have been developed to address food security. The main global policy to reduce hunger and poverty is in the Sustainable Development Goals. In particular Goal 2: Zero Hunger sets globally agreed targets to end hunger, achieve food security and improved nutrition, and promote sustainable agriculture by 2030. Although there has been some progress, the world is not on track to achieve the global nutrition targets, including those on child stunting, wasting and overweight by 2030.

== See also ==
- Agricultural economics
- Food price crisis
- Food Social Security
- Food race
- Food vs. fuel
- Integrated Food Security Phase Classification
- Malthusianism
- Nutritional economics
- Peak wheat
- Subsistence crisis
- Theories of famines
- 2025 hunger crisis in Syria
- Food sovereignty
- Food sovereignty (United States)

== Sources ==
This article incorporates text from a free content work. Licensed under CC BY 4.0 (license statement/permission). Text taken from The State of Agricultural Commodity Markets 2026, Food and Agriculture Organization of the United Nations.

This article incorporates text from a free content work. Licensed under CC BY 4.0 (license statement/permission). Text taken from The State of Food Security and Nutrition in the World 2026, Food and Agriculture Organization of the United Nations.

This article incorporates text from a free content work. Licensed under CC BY 4.0 (license statement/permission). Text taken from The State of Food Security and Nutrition in the World 2025, Food and Agriculture Organization of the United Nations.

This article incorporates text from a free content work. Licensed under CC BY 4.0 (license statement/permission). Text taken from The Impact of Disasters on Agriculture and Food Security 2025, The Food and Agriculture Organization of the United Nations.
