= Climate change in Syria =

Syria highlighted on a map of the Middle East

The effects of climate change in Syria are considerable. It has adverse effects on the livelihoods of the people as well as its environment. Syria is a developing and non-industrialized country that is located in an arid to semi-arid region. Climate change-induced droughts, water shortages, increasing temperatures and soil degradation affect agriculture especially. Desertification, which has historically been an issue in the region, is accelerating due to climate change. Syria has employed various efforts to address climate change, such as ratifying the Paris Treaty, and submitting its Nationally Determined Contributions (NDCs) with a focus on both adaptation and mitigation measures for the period 2020-2030. While it has contributed to only 0.1% of global emissions, it is highly vulnerable to climate change.

== Greenhouse gas emissions ==
Climate TRACE estimate 2024 emissions at 74 million tonnes CO_{2} equivalent, with the largest sectors being fossil fuel operations, power generation, and transport. Syria prepared it first national communication on climate change in 2010. Its total GHG emissions reached 79 million tonnes CO_{2} eq in 2005. The emissions originated mainly in its energy sector (73%), followed by agriculture sector (18%). These two sectors contributed to more than 90% of all emissions in Syria. Waste has also contributed to emissions, responsible for approximately 5% amongst all sectors from 1994 to 2005. Waste primarily emitted methane from organic waste in landfills and untreated sewage, though carbon dioxide accounts for the majority of emissions due to the use of fossil fuels in electricity and transport.

== Impact on the Natural Environment ==
=== Temperature and Weather Changes ===
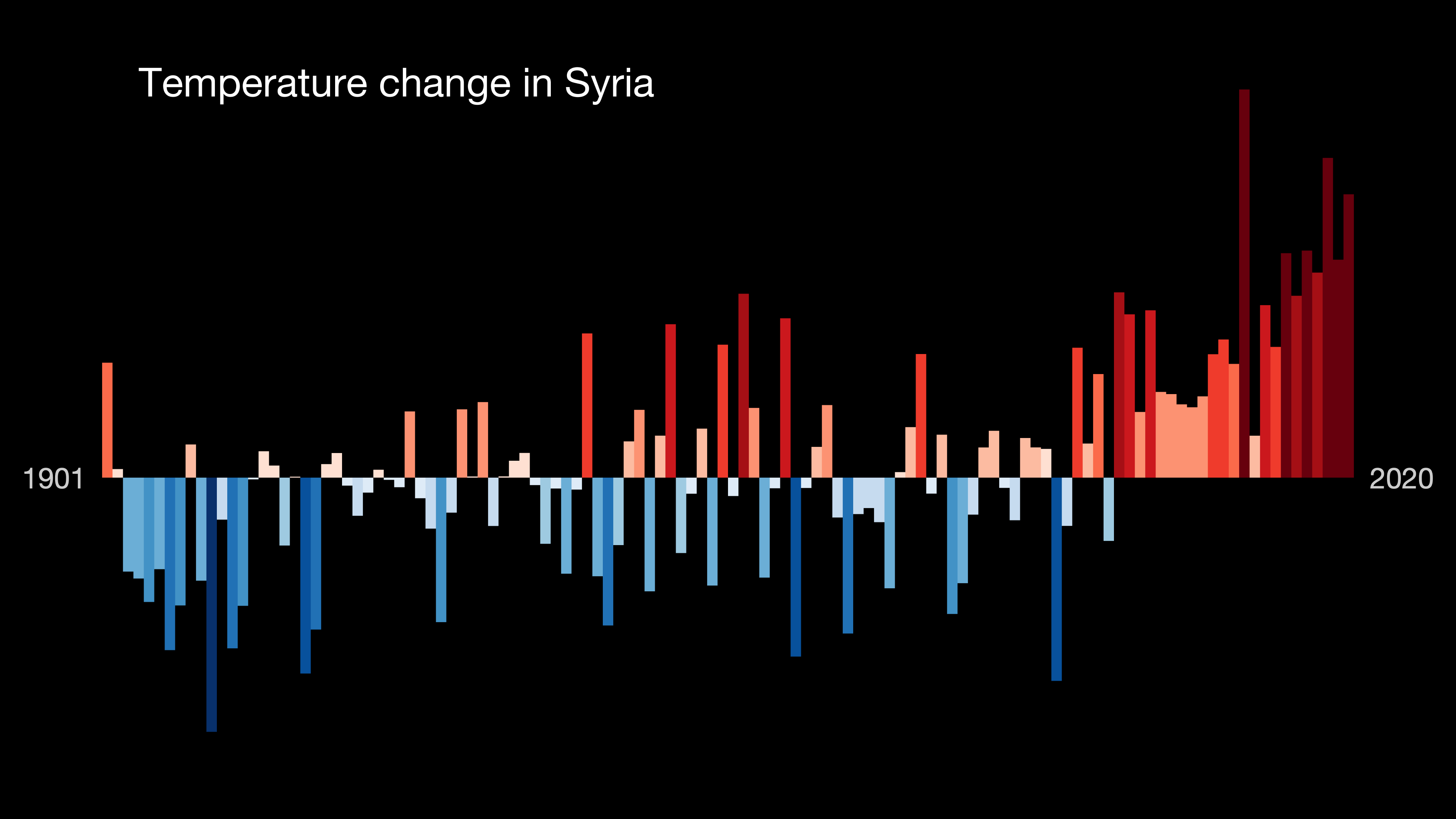
Temperature changes in Syria (1901-2020)

There is regional and seasonal variability of droughts in Syria. Autumn seasons have experienced slight increases in rainfall, where critical agricultural seasons such as winter and spring have steadily declined. Additionally, the southwestern portion of the country, near to the Mediterranean, has experienced minor increases in rainfall, while the northwestern portion has steadily declined. Drought risks have been found to be greatest in areas such as Al Qadmus. The Syrian Drought, from 2006 to 2011, is widely considered one of the worst in the region's history, and led to widespread agricultural failures, especially in the northeastern portion of the country. Farming and herding communities were deeply affected. The crisis compelled approximately 1.5 million rural Syrians to migrate to cities. While the period of time is consistent with decreasing rainfall data, some studies argue that the Syrian Drought was not a part of long term drying trends attributed to climate change.

There are persistent heatwaves in Syria, particularly since the 2010s. Compound events, which are hot and dry conditions simultaneously, have grown in frequency. These heatwaves have an annual frequency increase of 6.3%. Such extremes are particularly pronounced in northeastern and southwestern Syria. Both frequency and severity of extreme heat events are expected to rise significantly, which is especially true for densely populated areas. The number of people exposed to extreme heat is also projected to increase, as urban populations in Syria are expected to become more vulnerable.

=== Water Resources ===
The effect of climate change on Syria is reflected in its water scarcity issues. The Middle East is an arid climate, and climate change exacerbates its existing low precipitation levels and susceptibility to drought. Syria's overall rainfall has decreased over time between 1991 and 2009, particularly in the northwestern portion of the country in the winter and spring. Reports until 2011 show similar trends, along with increases in average temperatures, which have resulted in extreme droughts. These periods of drought have also grown in frequency and severity from the late 1990s onwards, with some lasting up to 200 days. Notable periods of drought include: 1998-1999, 2007-2008, 1972-1973, 2014, and 2016.

Syria's water scarcity due to drought is likely to continue intensifying, aligning with IPCC predictions of reduced rainfall in the Mediterranean. Between 2021 and 2050, temperatures could increase by approximately 1.6-2 °C, with precipitation dropping by approximately 11% in the winter and 8% in the spring. By 2070-2099, temperatures could rise by 4 °C, with an overall decrease of 22% in annual precipitation across the region. These reports also predict a 25-27% reduction in runoff, resulting in prolonged dry spells, coastal flooding, and intensified dust storms. The Figeh Spring, a critical water source near Damascus, Syria, is predicted to decrease its peak spring discharge by 20%, and up to 50% by the end of the century. Reduced recharge due to less snow and higher evapotranspiration could lead to a 9-30% decrease in annual discharge by the century's end. The decline of Figeh Spring's water output poses risks for Damascus' water supply.

== Impacts on People ==
=== Agriculture ===
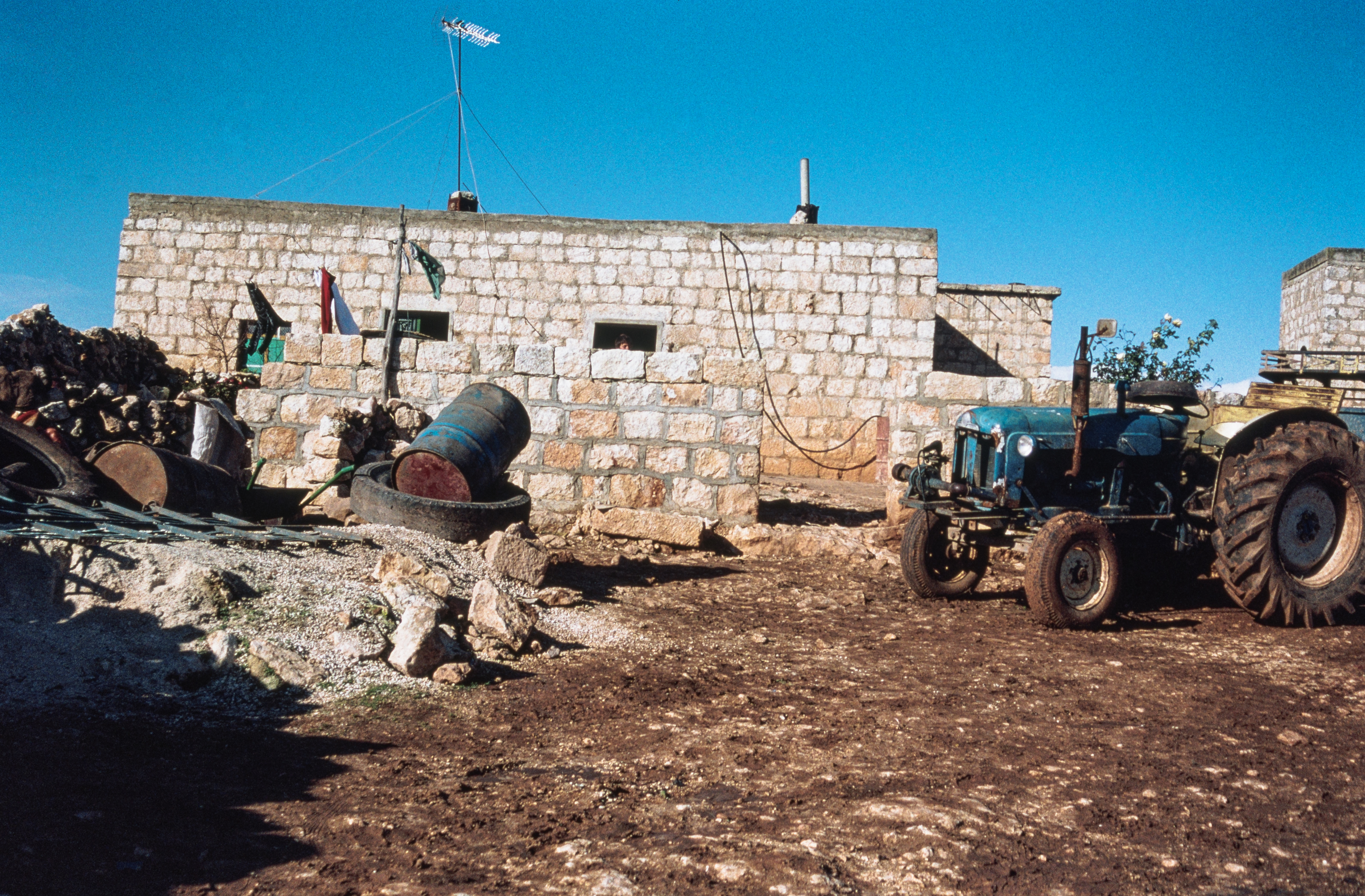
A farm in Kalota, Syria

Climate change's influence on drought periods have had effects on Syria's agricultural systems. Only 10% of Syria's farmland is irrigated, with its remaining portion relying on rainfall. Declining rainfall, poor irrigation practices, and government neglect of rural areas weakened food security and employment. Wheat production, for example, fell significantly, forcing Syria to import it for the first time. This severe strain on Syria's agriculture sector is due to climate change-driven drought, resulting in intensified water scarcity. Projected climate changes could further reduce agricultural productivity and increase soil salinity. This is especially true for areas such as the Fertile Crescent, an area crucial for agriculture, where decreased precipitation has resulted in major crop losses. Syria's unsustainable use of water resources and depleted river levels have long presented risks, with future climate trends likely to worsen groundwater depletion and drive greater reliance on rainfall.

Climate change has caused considerable damage to the livelihood of Syrian farmers. Droughts and desertification have caused a massive exodus of around 1.5 million people from rural agricultural communities to urban environments. These droughts, combined with government mismanagement, caused roughly 800,000 farmers to lose their livelihoods. The economic impacts of climate change on Syria are also projected to be devastating, with predictions stating that any given Syrian household, rural or urban, stands to lose 1.6 to 2.8 percent of their welfare annually due to climate change. The poorest groups of farmers have the least amount of resources to recover from droughts. Therefore, they are disproportionately affected by water shortages. Moreover, they take longer to recover financially.

=== Human Health ===
The drought in Syria from 2006 to 2010 decreased agricultural productivity and food access, as well as water scarcity. Scarcity of clean water, especially after Syria's major drought, has increased the risk of waterborne disease. Limited sanitation infrastructure has exacerbated health vulnerabilities, along with displacement and overcrowding which has increased disease transmission. Syria's climate-related impacts may worsen nutrition due to food insecurity related to agricultural productivity losses. The presence of waterborne diseases may also increase, with risks of malaria and vector-borne diseases caused by shifting climates and increases in drought-resilient rodent populations. The World Health Organization has called for increased support in disease surveillance, mental health services, and emergency preparedness. WHO advocates for targeted aid to address these health impacts.

There are also health damages associated with Syria's electricity generation system. Heavy fuel oil power plants, due to high sulfur content, generate significant health-related costs through pollutants that lead to respiratory and cardiovascular issues. The costs of these health issues vary significantly depending on the population density around the power plants. Facilities near densely populated areas, like Damascus, result in higher health costs due to more people being exposed to pollutants.

=== Conflict ===
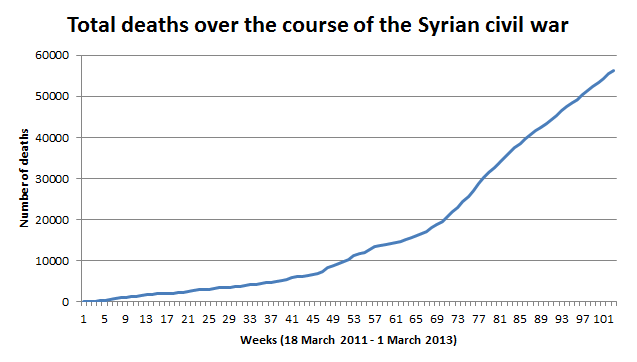
Total deaths over time as a result of the Syrian civil war

The major drought in early 2000s affected agricultural production. Economic factors have driven force of unrest, along with their failure to address a rising humanitarian crisis. The discontent in rural areas went back several years before the major drought. Syrian media outlets were also a factor, as they excluded coverage of the drought and its economic and political consequences. More comprehensively, climate change, poor water management, and lack of governmental support were all major elements that eventually led to the Syrian civil war.

But although severe droughts in Syria, such as those in 2007–2008 in the northeast, are made more likely by climate change in the Middle East, according to academics it is very unlikely that this was a cause of the Syrian civil war.

== Mitigation ==
Syria has moderate fossil fuel reserves, including oil and natural gas, though both contribute to emissions and therefore climate change. There have been significant efforts to expand natural gas for electricity production. Fossil fuels in the past and in modern day dominate energy sources, though hydropower is also a dominant source in Syria's energy profile. Renewable energy has been increasingly considered for long-term sustainability. The Syrian Civil War considerably damaged the country's infrastructure in areas such as healthcare and residential, which lowered the ability of the country to respond to the negative effects of climate change.

Syria's poor electricity infrastructure lacks capacity to endure extreme weather events such as heat waves, which are projected to worsen. Syria's demand for cooling systems has also increased with urbanization, population growth, and rising temperatures.

== Adaptation ==
Syria has high potential for utilization of solar energy, with average irradiance levels about 5 kWh/m²/day. Solar water heating systems have been in use, and there have also been plans to expand photovoltaic systems for both residential and rural applications. The Wind Atlas for Syria shows promising wing speeds in central, southern, and coastal areas. With these speeds, Syria has the potential to produce 85,000 MW of wind energy. Biomass resources, including animal and agricultural waste, are sufficient to produce approximately 357 million m³ of biogas annually.

== Policy ==
Syria has a number of international climate policies which it is involved in, with some being through the UNFCCC. This includes the 2010 Greenhouse Gas Inventory.

The country's internal environmental legislation has been known to be difficult to enforce, especially due to the unrest caused by the Syrian Civil war. Deliberate environmental attacks have proved hard to stop or are hard to enforce given the well discussed vague and high thresholds of both Syrian environmental law as well as international humanitarian and environmental laws.

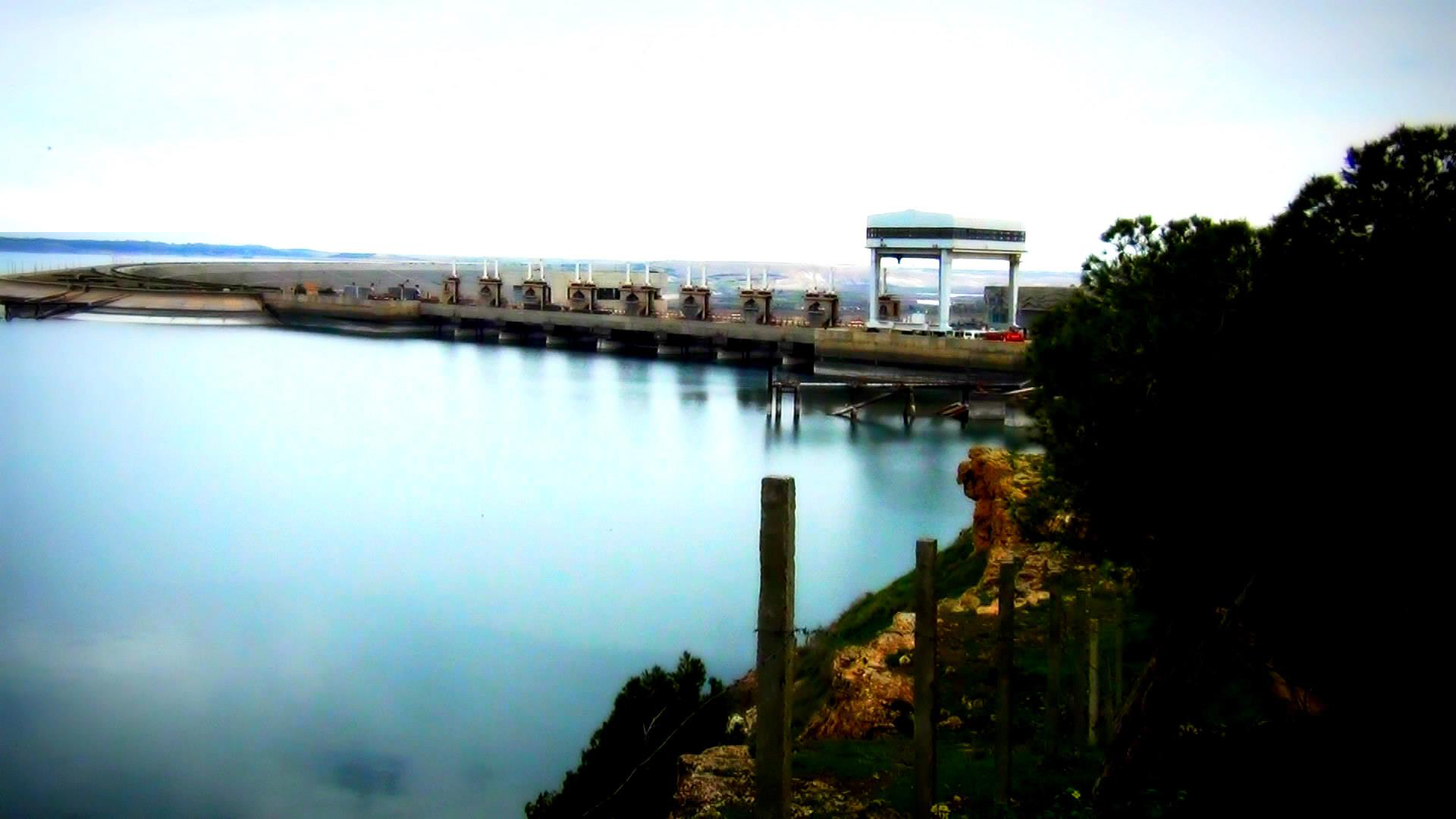
The Tabqa Dam in Raqqa, Syria

In an attempt to improve the country's food production and irrigating parts of the Middle Eastern Steppe, the Syrian government has instituted several policies centered around expanding irrigation, damming and the construction of reservoirs. The findings on the sustainability of these projects was inconclusive, however, it was found that irrigation of certain areas led to increased soil salinization.

Fighting desertification and deforestation has also been a focus of the Syrian government as well as forestry NGOs operating in the region. Only 3% of Syria's land area is forest, and many communities living in those areas use the forest as a resource, but come into conflict with farmers illegally grazing their livestock in and around the forests.

== See also ==
- 2025 hunger crisis in Syria
