= 2025 hunger crisis in Syria =

Hunger crisis in 2025

The 2025 hunger crisis in Syria refers to a severe humanitarian emergency, widely regarded as the most serious in its modern history, marked by widespread food insecurity and malnutrition across the Syrian Arab Republic. According to reports, over 14.5 million Syrians face food insecurity, 9.1 million in acute crisis and 5.4 million are at risk of slipping to severe hunger. This crisis has been caused by a harsh drought, economic collapse, political instability, and declining international aid.

== Background ==
The roots of the hunger in Syria date back to the 2011 Syrian civil war, that lasted over a decade and destroyed the country's agricultural sector, infrastructure, economy and caused mass displacement. In addition, the devastation of the 2023 earthquake, and the return of Syrian refugees after the fall of Bashar al-Assad's regime, made things worse for Syria. The new Syrian government has yet to address this crisis.

== Crisis causes ==
=== Drought and agricultural collapse ===
From the end of 2024 through 2025, Syria was suffering from the worst drought in the last 36 years, resulting in a massive agricultural decline. The falling levels of the Euphrates River, poor irrigation systems and climate change exacerbated the drought, leading to smallest wheat harvest in more than a decade. Reports show that wheat production was cut by 40%, causing a shortage of 2.73 million metric tons, an amount able to feed about 16 million people for a year. Only 40% of the Syria's farmland could be cultivated, and major food producing regions such as Al-Hasakah, Aleppo, and Homs suffered devastating losses. To compensate for this, Syria was forced to import 2.15 million tons of wheat, 53% more than the previous year, increasing the toll on its collapsed economy.

=== Economic collapse ===
The combination of years of war and economic decline have left most of Syrian households finding it difficult to afford food in 2025. Prices of food and fuel rose steeply as vital subsidies were removed. A basic monthly food basket for a family of five cost around 2.5 million Syrian pounds, while the minimum wage was only 280,000 pounds, less than one-fifth of what was needed. Even when some prices stopped rising, most families still could not afford basic goods. Sanctions, trade problems, and heavy dependence on imports made things worse.

=== Political instability ===
Following the fall of the Assad regime and the rise of Ahmed al-Sharaa's government during December 2024 that led to violence, looting and supply chain disruption, several areas in Syria suffered from extreme unrest, Suwayda was under blockades, Aleppo, Homs and Al-Hasakah did not allow regular supplies of agricultural products and aid.

=== Declining international aid ===
By the middle of 2025, both the United States and the European Union cut back much of their aid to Syria. This left the World Food Programme (WFP) without enough money to keep its work going, as it stated it needed an extra US$335 million to continue providing food. The lack of support was mainly because international donors were unsure about Syria's future under its temporary government. This funding gap made it harder to deliver food assistance to millions of Syrians who were already facing hunger.

== Humanitarian impact ==
The hunger crisis in 2025 is regarded as one of the worst in Syria's history. Rates of malnutrition rose sharply, with children in the north and northeast suffering the most. Rural areas that depend on wheat farming, especially in Aleppo, Homs, and Al-Hasakah, were hit the hardest, as farmers lost their harvests and families lost their main source of food and income. People living in displacement camps also faced growing hunger, since aid deliveries were limited and supply chains were severely disrupted. Many families in these camps were forced to cut back meals or rely on poor quality food, putting as reported: "More than 416,000 children in Syria are now at significant risk of severe malnutrition following the sudden suspension of foreign aid", so are vulnerable groups at even greater risk."

== International response ==
The United Nations, humanitarian agencies, and regional governments have urged urgent action to stop Syria's hunger crisis from turning into full famine. While the World Food Programme and NGOs such as Action Against Hunger and Save the Children increased their efforts, managing to deliver food to about 1.5 million Syrians each month, this was still far below what was needed. Serious funding shortages meant that only a fraction of vulnerable families received help. Neighboring Iraq sent emergency wheat shipments totaling around 220,000 tons, and some Gulf states offered limited financial aid, but these measures were not enough. International organizations warned that without stronger donor support, more food imports, and consistent aid delivery, the crisis would likely worsen into late 2025.

== See also ==
- Syrian civil war
- Climate change in Syria
- World Food Programme
- 2025 hunger crisis in Afghanistan
