= 2025–2026 hunger crisis in Afghanistan =

Hunger crises in 2025

The 2025–2026 hunger crisis in Afghanistan is an ongoing severe food insecurity, reported to be one of the worst of 2025 and 2026. Over 10 million Afghans require food assistance, with 3.5 million children suffering from malnutrition. The current crisis is due to economic collapse, climate volatility, mass displacement, and a sharp decline in international aid. Humanitarian groups claim that in the near future, Afghans and especially vulnerable families will be at serious risk because of diminished food assistance programs.

== Background ==
For years, Afghanistan has been facing food crises due to conflicts, unstable governments, natural disasters, and heavy dependence on international aid. Since the Taliban returned to power in 2021, the country has faced international sanctions and the freezing of US$3,500,000 of Afghan government assets by the United States. Humanitarian aid has also been severely reduced, with funding dropping from US$3,800,000,000 in 2022 to US$767,000,000. Afghanistan has also suffered several natural disasters that include droughts, earthquakes, and flash floods, causing significant damage to agricultural production. The deportation of 1.35 million Afghani refugees from Iran and Pakistan, brought even more stress on the country. These factors have caused unstable economic conditions.

== Scale ==
The Integrated Food Security Phase Classification (IPC), says that in 2025, Afghanistan is facing severe levels of food insecurity. About 17.2 million people, roughly 40% of the population, were classified in IPC Phase 3 (Crisis) or Phase 4 (Emergency), with 9.5 million projected to need urgent assistance between May and October. As of the latest report in September 2025, the situation has worsened to 22.9 million Afghans, over half of the population, needing humanitarian aid. This includes 12.6 million people categorized as “crisis” or “emergency” levels of acute food insecurity.

The World Food Programme (WFP), can only supply aid to about 1 million people each month, due to of lack of funding. This has left over 8 million people without food assistance. Many children under five are severely malnourished, with about 3.5 million affected, and hospitals have reported a third of children have stunted growth.

=== December 2025 reports ===
Reports from December 2025 state that one third of the population, which are 17 million people in Afghanistan are facing acute food insecurity during the winter months. This is a 3 million increase in compare to last year. Among the 17 million are 4 million children that will suffer from acute malnutrition. As the BBC said on December 2025 "The hunger crisis in Afghanistan cannot go much longer the UN will have to step in soon to provide food to starving people".

== Causes ==
The 2025 hunger crisis in Afghanistan has several causes.

Reduced funding

International aid has declined in the 2020s and lessened further in 2025. According to the World Food Programme (WFP) it can only support about 1 million people each month, while millions more are left without aid. The UN's funds for Afghanistan in 2025 were also cut by 15%, reducing food, health, and nutrition services.

Economic collapse

Since the Taliban returned to power in Afghanistan and international sanctions were subsequently enforced, its economy has rapidly declined. Unemployment is very high, the Afghan currency has lost its value, and food prices have risen sharply, leaving families unable to afford necessities.

Climate change

Afghanistan has been suffering from the effects of extreme climate change in recent years. Severe droughts, along with floods and irregular rainfall, have destroyed crops, forcing farming families to leave their land. As a result, many communities are left dependent on imports and aid.

Return of refugees

In 2025, over 1.5 million Afghans were deported back to Afghanistan from Iran and Pakistan, often with no resources, adding pressure to already scarce supplies. According to a November 2025 report, 1.8 million Afghans returned to the country, 1.19 million were Afghans deported from Iran.

Access restrictions

The severe Sharia laws contrary to international women's rights in Afghanistan have reduced the numbers of female humanitarian workers in many areas, limiting aid delivery, especially to women and children.

== Humanitarian impact ==
The hunger crisis has had a severe effect on the country's population. According to the United Nations, more young children are suffering from malnutrition, which leads to stunted growth and child deaths. Pregnant women and mothers who are still breastfeeding, are also at high risk as they do not eat enough healthy food. The situation is worse for refugees returning to the country and displaced people as they are more likely to be without jobs and homes. In 2025, the Global Hunger Index ranked Afghanistan 109th worst hunger of 123 countries that could be examined. It found 28.1% of the population was undernourished, 42%of children under 5 were stunted (reflecting acute undernutrition), 3.6% of children under 5 are wasted (representing chronic malnutrition and 5.6% of children die before their 5th birthday.

In Kabul and other cities, many people beg for food and families are forced to live in hunger. Nutrition centers are overcrowded, and the World Food Programme cannot take in new mothers and children who need help due to funding restrictions. Aid groups warn that without more support, the coming winter could push millions into famine.

== International and local responses ==
Even though the 2025 hunger crisis in Afghanistan is causing great international concern, efforts to provide sufficient aid have encountered many problems because of cuts in funds, problems in transport and aid delivery, as well as government restrictions. The World Food Programme has provided limited food aid, while UNICEF and its partners have run nutrition programs for children and mothers.

In January 2026, the UN and the Asian Development Bank launched a two-year, US$100 million programme to support more than 151,000 families in Afghanistan.

In January 2026, Australia sent an additional $50 million in humanitarian aid to Afghanistan, bringing the total aid since 2021 to $310 million. This support aims to address the worsening crisis exacerbated by Taliban rule, particularly focusing on food security, health services, and aid for women and children. Agencies like the World Food Programme and Save the Children will help deliver the aid.

== See also ==
- World Food Programme
- 2025 hunger crisis in Syria
- 2025 Afghan deportation from Iran
